= Sri Lanka =

Country in South Asia

Democratic Socialist Republic of
Sri Lanka
(in official languages)
Sinhala	ශ්‍රී ලංකා ප්‍රජාතාන්ත්‍රික සමාජවාදී ජනරජය; Śrī Laṅkā Prajātāntrika Samājavādī Janarajaya
Tamil	இலங்கை சனநாயக சோசலிசக் குடியரசு Ilaṅkai Caṉanāyaka Cōcalicak Kuṭiyaracu
- Flag Emblem
- Anthem: "Sri Lanka Matha" ශ්‍රී ලංකා මාතා (Sinhala) தாயே இலங்கை (Tamil) (English: "Mother Sri Lanka")
- Capital: Sri Jayawardenepura Kotte (legislative); Colombo (executive and judicial) 6°56′N 79°52′E
- Largest city: Colombo
- Official languages and recognised national languages: Sinhala; Tamil
- Recognised language: English
- Ethnic groups (2024): 74.1% Sinhalese; 12.3% Sri Lankan Tamils; 10.5% Sri Lankan Moors; 2.8% Indian Tamils; 0.3% other
- Religion (2024): 69.8% Buddhism (constitutionally privileged); 12.6% Hinduism; 10.7% Islam; 6.9% Christianity; 0.1% other/none
- Demonym: Sri Lankan
- Government: Unitary semi-presidential republic
  - President: Anura Kumara Dissanayake
  - Prime Minister: Harini Amarasuriya
  - Speaker of the Parliament: Jagath Wickramaratne
  - Chief Justice: Padman Surasena
- Legislature: Parliament

Formation
  - Sinhala Kingdom established: 543 BCE
  - Anuradhapura period: 377 BCE – 1017 CE
  - Polonnaruwa period: 1017–1232
  - Transitional period: 1232–1592
  - Kandyan period: 1592–1815
  - British Ceylon period: 1815–1948
  - Independence: 4 February 1948
  - Republic: 22 May 1972
  - Current constitution: 7 September 1978

Area
  - Total: 67,240 km^{2} (25,960 sq mi) (120th)
  - Water (%): 4.4

Population
  - 2025 (mid-year) estimate: ▼21,756,000 (60th)
  - 2024 census: 21,781,800
  - Density: 337.7/km^{2} (874.6/sq mi) (36th)
- GDP (PPP): 2026 estimate
  - Total: ▲$398.953 billion (62nd)
  - Per capita: ▲$18,246 (111th)
- GDP (nominal): 2026 estimate
  - Total: ▲$110.680 billion (71st)
  - Per capita: ▲$5,062 (122nd)
- Gini (2023): ▼39.8 medium inequality
- HDI (2023): ▼0.776 high (89th)
- Currency: Sri Lankan rupee (Rs) (LKR)
- Time zone: UTC+5:30 (SLST)
- Calling code: +94
- ISO 3166 code: LK
- Internet TLD: .lk; .ලංකා; .இலங்கை
- Website gov.lk

Sri Lanka, (Note: UK: /sri ˈlæŋkə, ʃriː -/, US: /- ˈlɑːŋkə/; Sinhala: ශ්‍රී ලංකා, romanised: Śrī Laṅkā (IPA: [ʃriː laŋkaː]); Tamil: இலங்கை, romanised: Ilaṅkai (IPA: [ilaŋɡaj]).) officially the Democratic Socialist Republic of Sri Lanka, formerly known as Ceylon, (Note: Many names have been used to refer to the island, with Ceylon being used post-independence and still in use in some cases. For other names, see Names of Sri Lanka.) is an island country in South Asia. It is located in the Indian Ocean, southwest of the Bay of Bengal, and is separated from India by the Gulf of Mannar and the Palk Strait. Sri Lanka shares a maritime border with the Maldives to the southwest and India to the northwest, and lies across the Bay of Bengal from Bangladesh and Myanmar to the northeast and the Andaman and Nicobar Islands of India to the east. Its executive and judicial capital is Colombo, which is also its largest city and the political, financial and cultural centre of the country; neighboring Sri Jayawardenepura Kotte is the legislative capital. Sri Lanka's population is 22 million. About 74% of the population are Sinhalese, who speak the Sinhala language, and about 15% are Tamils who speak the Tamil language. Other long-established ethnic groups include the Moors, Indian Tamils, Burghers, Malays, Chinese, and Vedda.

The island has a documented history of over 3,000 years, with evidence of prehistoric human settlement dating back 125,000 years. Sri Lanka has been given various names throughout its long history, with Ceylon most notably being used prior to its independence in 1948. The earliest known Buddhist writings in the island, known collectively as the Pali Canon, date back to 29 BCE. Sri Lanka, owing to its strategic geographical location, played a role as a major trading hub, and was well known to explorers across the world as early as the Anuradhapura period. The Portuguese Empire established a colony in the sixteenth century, during a period of political upheaval in the Kingdom of Kotte where it also faced attacks from neighbouring kingdoms of Kandy and Sitawaka. Following the Sinhalese–Portuguese War, the Dutch colonial empire controlled the coastal areas. By the early 19th century, the British Empire established a colony on the island, which lasted until 1948. The early 20th century saw the rise of nationalist movements and increasing calls for independence. In 1948, Sri Lanka gained independence as the Dominion of Ceylon, eventually becoming a republic in 1972. Sri Lanka's recent history has been marred by a prolonged civil war between the Tamil separatist militant organisation of Liberation Tigers of Tamil Eelam and the Sri Lankan Armed Forces, which lasted from 1983 to 2009, and ended with the defeat of the separatists.

In the 21st century, Sri Lanka has emerged as a developing country, with a strategically important geographical location in the Indian Ocean, with its deep harbours giving it significant geopolitical leverage as a major trading post from the ancient Maritime Silk Road. It has the highest level of human development in South Asia and the second-highest GDP per capita in the region. Sri Lanka has a long history of international engagement and cooperation, and is a member of several international organisations—including SAARC, the G77, the Non-Aligned Movement and the Commonwealth of Nations.

== Names and toponymy ==
In antiquity, Sri Lanka was known to travellers by a variety of names. According to the Mahāvaṃsa, the legendary Prince Vijaya named the island Tambapaṇṇĩ ("copper-red hands" or "copper-red earth"), because his followers' hands were reddened by the red soil of the area where he landed. In Hindu mythology, the term Lankā ("Island") appears but it is unknown whether it refers to the island. The Tamil term Eelam (Tamil: ஈழம், romanised: īḻam) was used to designate the whole island in Sangam literature. The island was known under Chola rule as Mummudi Cholamandalam ("realm of the three crowned Cholas").

Ancient Greek geographers called it Taprobanā (Ancient Greek: Ταπροβανᾶ) or Taprobanē (Ταπροβανῆ) from the word Tambapanni. The Arabs and Persians referred to it as Sarandīb (the origin of the word "serendipity") from Sanskrit Siṃhaladvīpaḥ. Ceilão, the name given to Sri Lanka by the Portuguese when they arrived in 1505, was transliterated into English as Ceylon. As a British crown colony, the island was known as Ceylon; it achieved independence as the Dominion of Ceylon in 1948.

The country is now known in Sinhala as Śrī Laṅkā (Sinhala: ශ්‍රී ලංකා) and in Tamil as Ilaṅkai (Tamil: இலங்கை, IPA: [iˈlaŋɡaɪ]). In 1972, its formal name was changed to Free, Sovereign and Independent Republic of Sri Lanka. Later, on 7 September 1978, it was changed to the Democratic Socialist Republic of Sri Lanka. As the name Ceylon still appears in the names of a number of organisations, the Sri Lankan government announced in 2011 a plan to rename all those over which it has authority.

== History ==
=== Prehistory ===
The pre-history of Sri Lanka goes back 125,000 years and possibly even as far back as 500,000 years. The era spans the Palaeolithic, Mesolithic, and early Iron Ages. Among the Palaeolithic human settlements discovered in Sri Lanka, Pahiyangala (37,000 BP), named after the Chinese traveller monk Faxian; Batadombalena (28,500 BP); and Belilena (12,000 BP) are the most important. In these caves, archaeologists have found the remains of anatomically modern humans which they have named Balangoda Man, and other evidence suggesting that they may have engaged in agriculture and kept domestic dogs for driving game.

The earliest inhabitants of Sri Lanka were likely ancestors of the Vedda people, an indigenous people numbering approximately 2,500 living in modern-day Sri Lanka.

During the protohistoric period (1000–500 BCE) Sri Lanka was culturally united with southern India, and shared the same megalithic burials, pottery, iron technology, farming techniques and megalithic graffiti. This cultural complex spread from southern India along with Dravidian clans such as the Velir, prior to the migration of Prakrit speakers.

One of the first written references to the island is found in the Indian epic Ramayana, which provides details of a kingdom named Lanka that was created by the divine sculptor Vishvakarma for Kubera, the God of Wealth. It is said that Kubera was overthrown by his rakshasa stepbrother, Ravana.

=== Ancient history ===
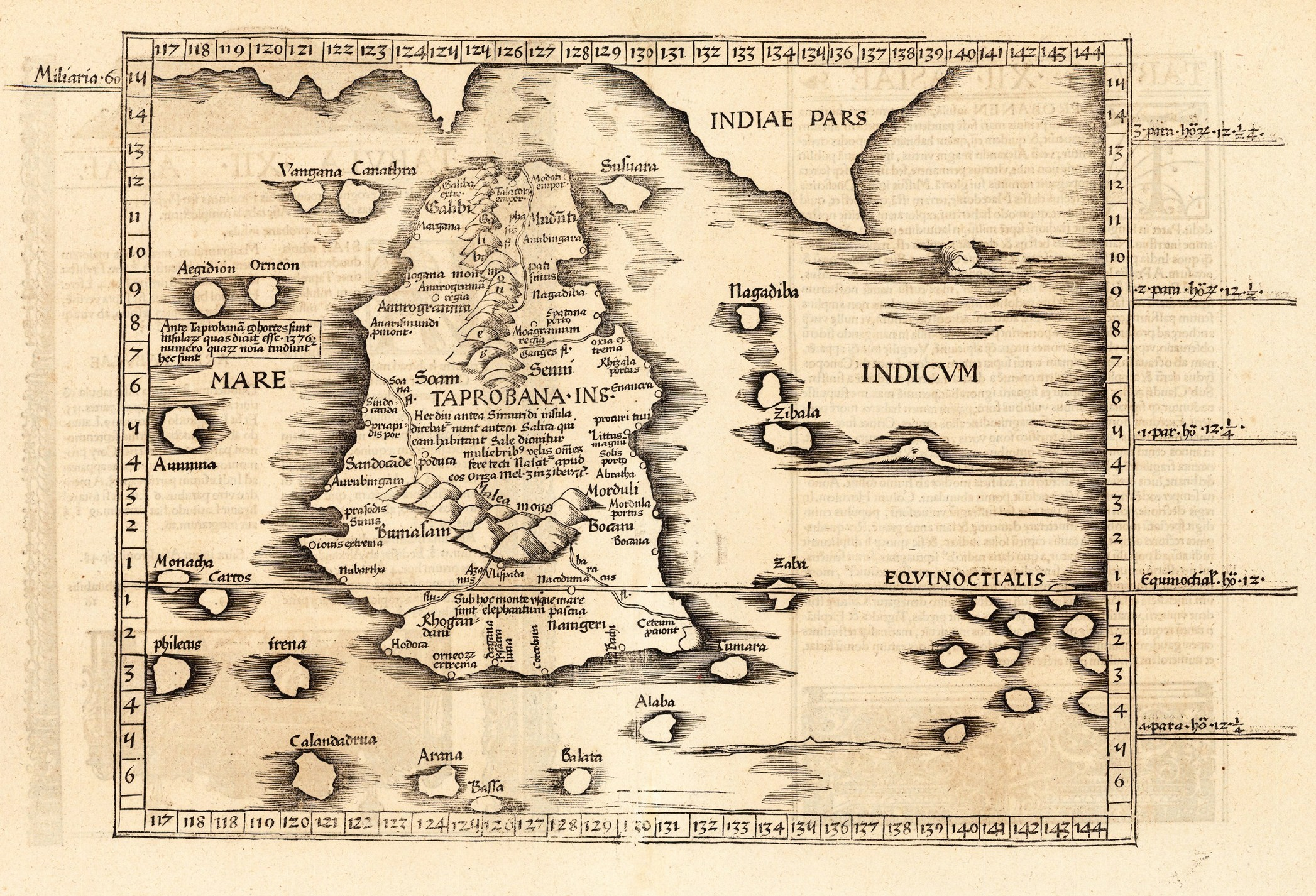
Ptolemy's world map of Ceylon, first century CE, in a 1535 publication

According to the Mahāvaṃsa, a Pāḷi chronicle written in the 5th century CE, the original inhabitants of Sri Lanka are said to be the Yakshas and Nagas. Sinhalese history traditionally starts in 543 BCE with the arrival of Prince Vijaya, a semi-legendary prince who sailed with 700 followers to Sri Lanka, after being expelled from Vanga kingdom (present-day Bengal). He established the Kingdom of Tambapanni, near modern-day Mannar. Vijaya (Singha) is the first of the approximately 189 monarchs of Sri Lanka described in chronicles such as the Dīpavaṃsa, Mahāvaṃsa, Cūḷavaṃsa, and Rājāvaliya.

Once Prakrit speakers had attained dominance on the island, the Mahāvaṃsa further recounts the later migration of royal brides and service castes from the Tamil Pandya kingdom to the Anuradhapura kingdom in the early historic period.

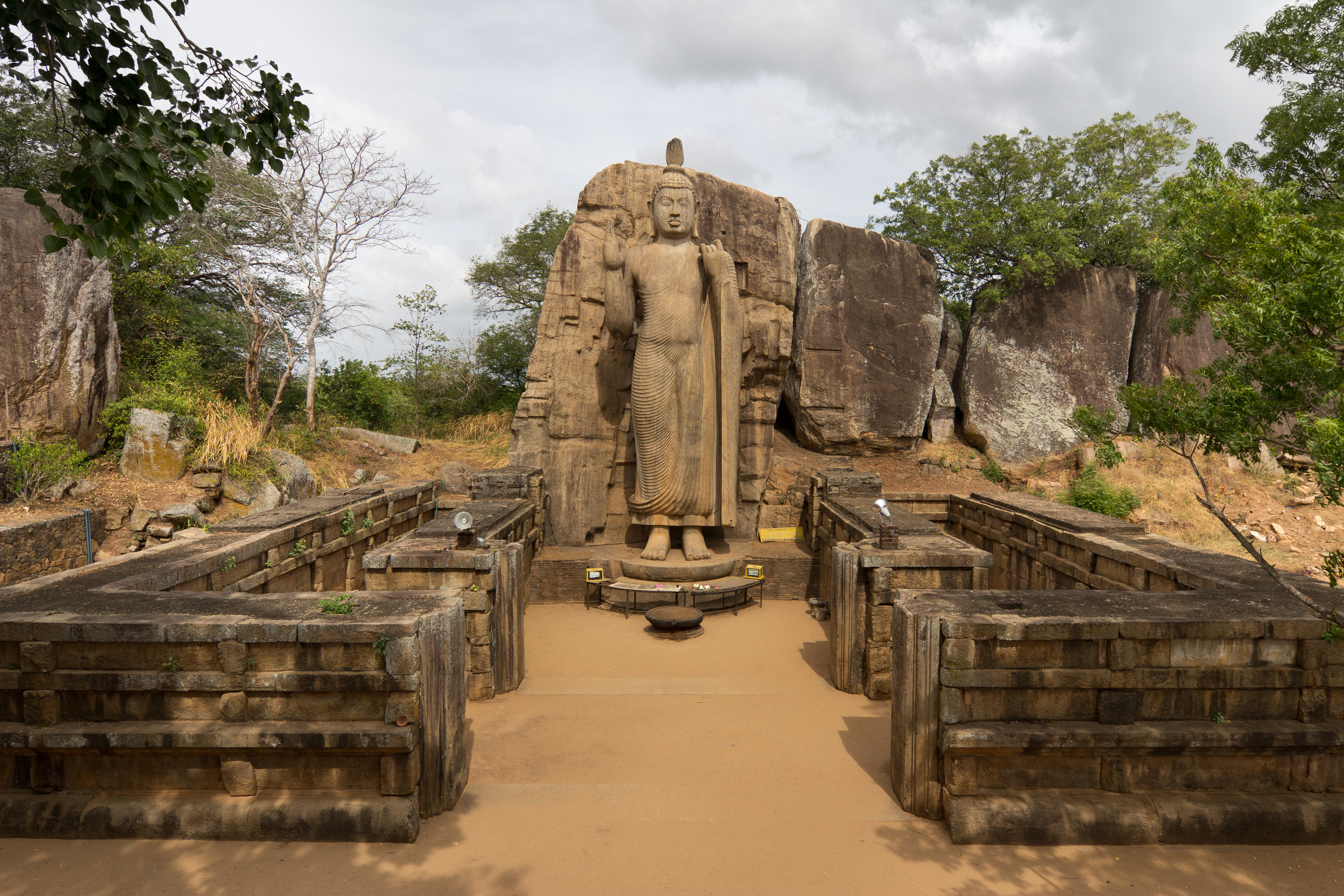
The Avukana Buddha statue, a 12-metre-tall (39 ft) standing Buddha statue from the reign of Dhatusena of Anuradhapura, 5th century

The Anuradhapura period (377 BCE – 1017 CE) began with the establishment of the Anuradhapura kingdom in 380 BCE during the reign of Pandukabhaya. Thereafter, Anuradhapura served as the capital city of the country for nearly 1,400 years. Ancient Sri Lankans excelled at building certain types of structures such as tanks, dagobas and palaces. Society underwent a major transformation during the reign of Devanampiya Tissa, with the arrival of Buddhism from India. In 250 BCE, Mahinda, a bhikkhu and the son of the Mauryan Emperor Ashoka arrived in Mihintale carrying the message of Buddhism. His mission won over the monarch, who embraced the faith and propagated it throughout the Sinhalese population.

Succeeding kingdoms of Sri Lanka would maintain many Buddhist schools and monasteries and support the propagation of Buddhism into other countries in Southeast Asia. Sri Lankan Bhikkhus studied in India's famous ancient Buddhist University of Nalanda, which was destroyed by Bakhtiyar Khalji. It is probable that many of the scriptures from Nalanda are preserved in Sri Lanka's many monasteries and that the written form of the Tripiṭaka, including Sinhalese Buddhist literature, were part of the University of Nalanda. In 245 BCE, bhikkhunī Sanghamitta arrived with the Jaya Sri Maha Bodhi tree, which is considered to be a sapling from the historical Bodhi Tree under which Gautama Buddha became enlightened. It is considered the oldest human-planted tree (with a continuous historical record) in the world. (Bodhivaṃsa)

Sri Lanka experienced the first of many foreign invasions during the reign of Suratissa, who was defeated by two horse traders named Sena and Guttika from South India. The next invasion came immediately in 205 BCE by a Chola named Elara, who overthrew Asela and ruled the country for 44 years. Dutugamunu, the eldest son of the southern regional sub-king, Kavan Tissa, defeated Elara in the Battle of Vijithapura. During its two and a half millennia of existence, the Sinhala kingdom was invaded at least eight times by neighbouring South Indian dynasties such as the Chola, Pandya, and Pallava. There also were incursions by the kingdoms of Kalinga (modern Odisha) and from the Malay Peninsula as well.

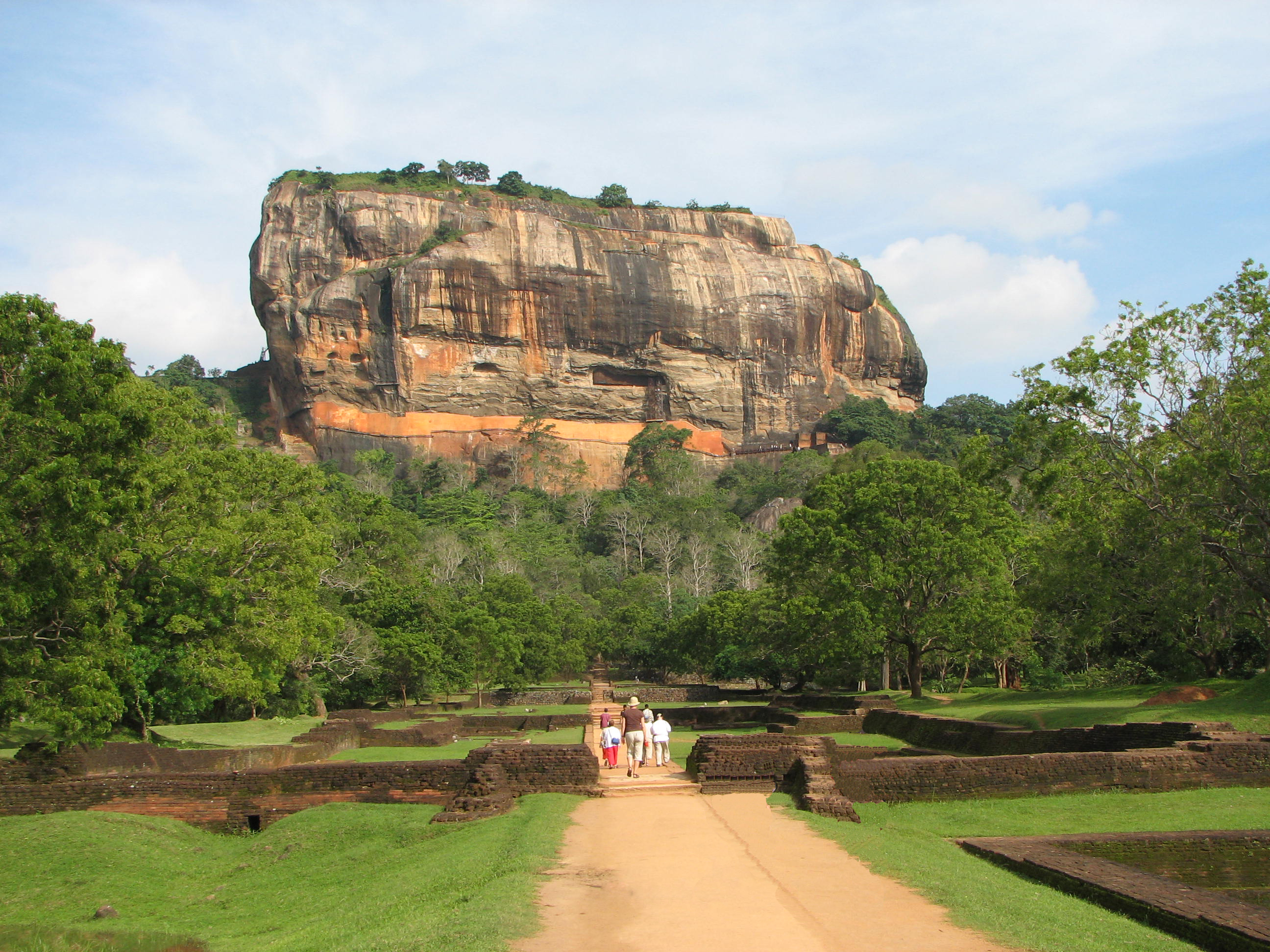
The Sigiriya ("Lion Rock"), a rock fortress and city, built by King Kashyapa (477–495 CE) as a new more defensible capital. It was also used as a Buddhist monastery after the capital was moved back to Anuradhapura.

The Fourth Theravāda Council was held at the Anuradhapura Maha Viharaya in Sri Lanka under the patronage of Valagamba in 25 BCE. The council was held in response to a year in which the harvests in Sri Lanka were particularly poor and many Buddhist monks subsequently died of starvation. Because the Pali Canon was at that time oral literature maintained in several recensions by dhammabhāṇakas (dharma reciters), the surviving monks recognised the danger of not writing it down so that even if some of the monks whose duty it was to study and remember parts of the Canon for later generations died, the teachings would not be lost. After the council, palm-leaf manuscripts containing the completed Canon were taken to other countries such as Burma, Thailand, Cambodia and Laos.

Sri Lanka was the first Asian country known to have a female ruler: Anula of Anuradhapura (r. 47–42 BCE). Sri Lankan monarchs undertook some remarkable construction projects such as Sigiriya, the so-called "Fortress in the Sky", built during the reign of Kashyapa I, who ruled between 477 and 495. The Sigiriya rock fortress is surrounded by an extensive network of ramparts and moats. Inside this protective enclosure were gardens, ponds, pavilions, palaces and other structures.

In 993 CE, the invasion of Chola emperor Rajaraja I forced the then Sinhalese ruler Mahinda V to flee to the southern part of Sri Lanka. Taking advantage of this situation, Rajendra I, son of Rajaraja I, launched a large invasion in 1017. Mahinda V was captured and taken to India, and the Cholas sacked the city of Anuradhapura causing the fall of Anuradhapura kingdom. Subsequently, they moved the capital to Polonnaruwa.

=== Post-classical period ===
Following a 17-year-long campaign, Vijayabahu I successfully drove the Chola out of Sri Lanka in 1070, reuniting the country for the first time in over a century. Upon his request, ordained monks were sent from Burma to Sri Lanka to re-establish Buddhism, which had almost disappeared from the country during the Chola reign. During the mediaeval period, Sri Lanka was divided into three sub-territories, namely, Ruhunu, Pihiti and Maya.

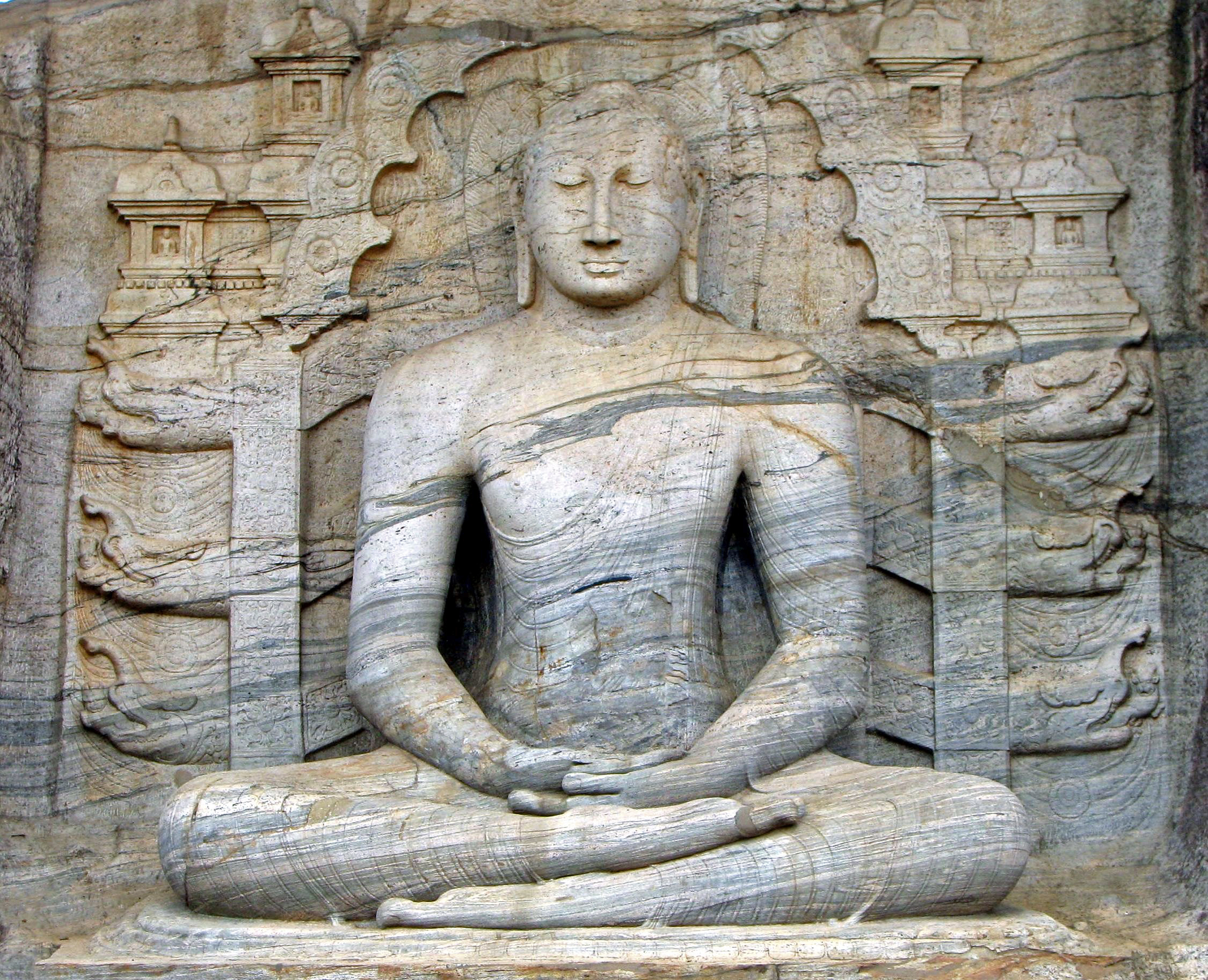
The seated image of Gal Vihara in Polonnaruwa, 12th century, which depicts the dhyana mudra, shows signs of Mahayana influence.

Sri Lanka's irrigation system was extensively expanded during the reign of Parākramabāhu the Great (1153–1186). This period is considered as a time when Sri Lanka was at the height of its power. He built 1,470 reservoirs – the highest number by any ruler in Sri Lanka's history – repaired 165 dams, 3,910 canals, 163 major reservoirs, and 2,376 mini-reservoirs. His most famous construction is the Parakrama Samudra, the largest irrigation project of mediaeval Sri Lanka. Parākramabāhu's reign is memorable for two major campaigns – in the south of India as part of a Pandyan war of succession, and a punitive strike against the kings of Ramanna (Burma) for various perceived insults to Sri Lanka.

After his demise, Sri Lanka gradually decayed in power. In 1215, Kalinga Magha, an invader with uncertain origins, identified as the founder of the Jaffna kingdom, invaded and captured the Kingdom of Polonnaruwa. He sailed from Kalinga 690 nautical miles on 100 large ships with a 24,000 strong army. Unlike previous invaders, he looted, ransacked and destroyed everything in the ancient Anuradhapura and Polonnaruwa Kingdoms beyond recovery. His priorities in ruling were to extract as much as possible from the land and overturn as many of the traditions of Rajarata as possible. His reign saw the massive migration of native Sinhalese people to the south and west of Sri Lanka, and into the mountainous interior, in a bid to escape his power.

Sri Lanka never really recovered from the effects of Kalinga Magha's invasion. King Vijayabâhu III, who led the resistance, brought the kingdom to Dambadeniya. The north, in the meanwhile, eventually evolved into the Jaffna kingdom. The Jaffna kingdom never came under the rule of any kingdom of the south except on one occasion; in 1450, following the conquest led by king Parâkramabâhu VI's adopted son, Prince Sapumal. He ruled the North from 1450 to 1467 CE.

The next three centuries starting from 1215 were marked by kaleidoscopically shifting collections of capitals in south and central Sri Lanka, including Dambadeniya, Yapahuwa, Gampola, Raigama, Kotte, Sitawaka, and finally, Kandy. In 1247, the Malay kingdom of Tambralinga which was a vassal of Sri Vijaya led by their king Chandrabhanu briefly invaded Sri Lanka from Insular Southeast Asia. They were then expelled by the South Indian Pandyan dynasty. However, this temporary invasion reinforced the steady flow of the presence of various Austronesian merchant ethnic groups, from Sumatrans (Indonesia) to Lucoes (Philippines) into Sri Lanka which occurred since 200 BCE. Chinese admiral Zheng He and his naval expeditionary force landed at Galle, Sri Lanka in 1409 and got into battle with the local king Vira Alakesvara of Gampola. Zheng He captured King Vira Alakesvara and later released him. Zheng He erected the Galle Trilingual Inscription, a stone tablet at Galle written in three languages (Chinese, Tamil, and Persian), to commemorate his visit. The stele was discovered by S. H. Thomlin at Galle in 1911 and is now preserved in the Colombo National Museum.

=== Early modern period ===
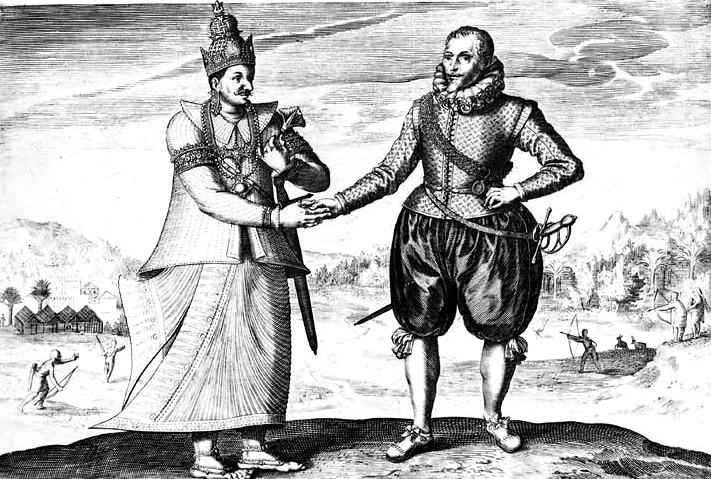
A 17th-century engraving of Dutch explorer Joris van Spilbergen meeting with King Vimaladharmasuriya in 1602

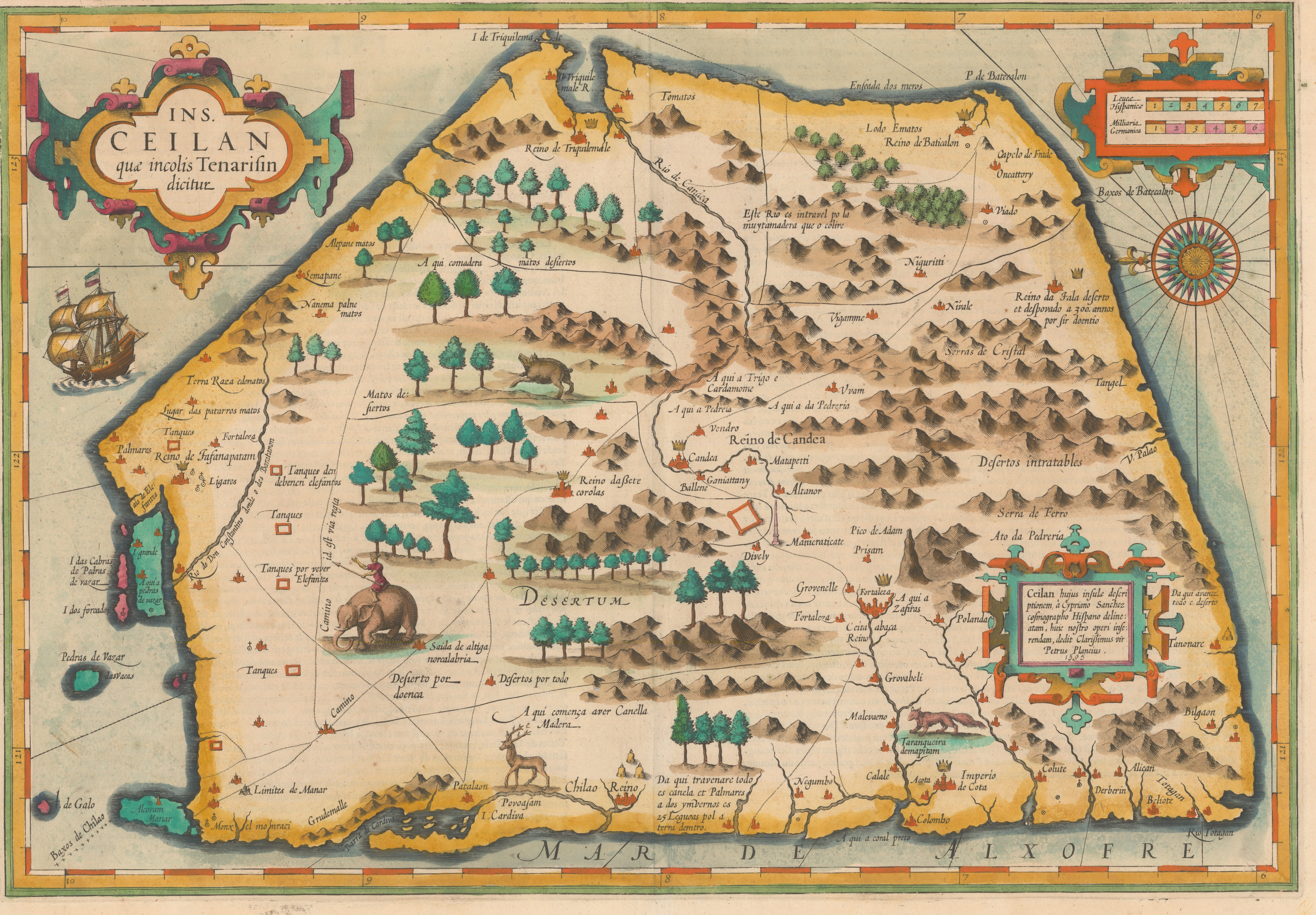
A 1595 map of Sri Lanka created by Dutch cartographer Petrus Plancius

The early modern period of Sri Lanka begins with the arrival of Portuguese soldier and explorer Lourenço de Almeida, the son of Francisco de Almeida, in 1505. In 1517, the Portuguese built a fort at the port city of Colombo and gradually extended their control over the coastal areas. In 1592, after decades of intermittent warfare with the Portuguese, Vimaladharmasuriya I moved his kingdom to the inland city of Kandy, a location he thought more secure from attack. In 1619, succumbing to attacks by the Portuguese, the independent existence of the Jaffna kingdom came to an end.

During the reign of the Rajasinha II, Dutch explorers arrived on the island. In 1638, the king signed a treaty with the Dutch East India Company to get rid of the Portuguese who ruled most of the coastal areas. The following Dutch–Portuguese War resulted in a Dutch victory, with Colombo falling into Dutch hands by 1656. The Dutch remained in the areas they had captured, thereby violating the treaty they had signed in 1638. The Burgher people, a distinct ethnic group, emerged as a result of intermingling between the Dutch and native Sri Lankans in this period.

The Kingdom of Kandy was the last independent monarchy of Sri Lanka. In 1595, Vimaladharmasurya brought the sacred Tooth Relic—the traditional symbol of royal and religious authority amongst the Sinhalese—to Kandy and built the Temple of the Tooth. In spite of on-going intermittent warfare with Europeans, the kingdom survived. Later, a crisis of succession emerged in Kandy upon king Vira Narendra Sinha 's death in 1739. He was married to a Telugu-speaking Nayakkar princess from South India (Madurai) and was childless by her.

Eventually, with the support of bhikkhu Weliwita Sarankara and ignoring the right of "Unambuwe Bandara", the crown passed to the brother of one of Narendrasinha's princesses, overlooking Narendrasinha's own son by a Sinhalese concubine. The new king was crowned Sri Vijaya Rajasinha later that year. Kings of the Nayakkar dynasty launched several attacks on Dutch-controlled areas, which proved to be unsuccessful.

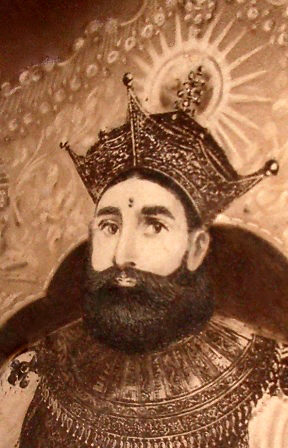
Sri Vikrama Rajasinha of Kandy, the last ruling native Sri Lankan monarch

During the French Revolutionary Wars, fearing that French control of the Netherlands might deliver Sri Lanka to the French, the British Empire occupied the coastal areas of the island (which they called the colony of British Ceylon) with little difficulty in 1796. Two years later, in 1798, Sri Rajadhi Rajasinha, third of the four Nayakkar kings of Sri Lanka, died of a fever. Following his death, a nephew of Rajadhi Rajasinha, eighteen-year-old Kannasamy, was crowned. The young king, now named Sri Vikrama Rajasinha, faced a British invasion in 1803 but successfully retaliated. The First Kandyan War ended in a stalemate.

By then the entire coastal area was under the British East India Company as a result of the Treaty of Amiens. On 14 February 1815, Kandy was occupied by the British in the Second Kandyan War, ending Sri Lanka's independence. Sri Vikrama Rajasinha, the last native monarch of Sri Lanka, was exiled to India. The Kandyan Convention formally ceded the entire country to the British Empire. Attempts by Sri Lankan noblemen to undermine British power in 1818 during the Uva Rebellion were thwarted by Governor Robert Brownrigg.

The beginning of the modern period of Sri Lanka is marked by the Colebrooke–Cameron reforms of 1833. They introduced a utilitarian and liberal political culture to the country based on the rule of law and amalgamated the Kandyan and maritime provinces as a single unit of government. An executive council and a legislative council were established, later becoming the foundation of a representative legislature. By this time, experiments with coffee plantations were largely successful.

Soon, coffee became the primary commodity export of Sri Lanka. Falling coffee prices as a result of the depression of 1847 stalled economic development and prompted the governor to introduce a series of taxes on firearms, dogs, shops, boats, etc., and to reintroduce a form of rajakariya, requiring six days free labour on roads or payment of a cash equivalent. These harsh measures antagonised the locals, and another rebellion broke out in 1848. A devastating leaf disease, Hemileia vastatrix, struck the coffee plantations in 1869, destroying the entire industry within fifteen years. The British quickly found a replacement: abandoning coffee, they began cultivating tea instead. Tea production in Sri Lanka thrived in the following decades. Large-scale rubber plantations began in the early 20th century.

British appointed Kandyan chief headmen in 1905.

By the end of the 19th century, a new educated social class transcending race and caste arose through British attempts to staff the Ceylon Civil Service and the legal, educational, engineering, and medical professions with natives. New leaders represented the various ethnic groups of the population in the Ceylon Legislative Council on a communal basis. Buddhist and Hindu revivalists reacted against Christian missionary activities. The first two decades in the 20th century are noted by the unique harmony among Sinhalese and Tamil political leadership, which has since been lost.

The 1906 malaria outbreak in Ceylon actually started in the early 1900s, but the first case was documented in 1906.

In 1919, major Sinhalese and Tamil political organisations united to form the Ceylon National Congress, under the leadership of Ponnambalam Arunachalam, pressing colonial masters for more constitutional reforms. But without massive popular support, and with the governor's encouragement for "communal representation" by creating a "Colombo seat" that dangled between Sinhalese and Tamils, the Congress lost momentum towards the mid-1920s.

The Donoughmore reforms of 1931 repudiated the communal representation and introduced universal adult franchise (the franchise stood at 4% before the reforms). This step was strongly criticised by the Tamil political leadership, who realised that they would be reduced to a minority in the newly created State Council of Ceylon, which succeeded the legislative council. In 1937, Tamil leader G. G. Ponnambalam demanded a 50–50 representation (50% for the Sinhalese and 50% for other ethnic groups) in the State Council. However, this demand was not met by the Soulbury reforms of 1944–45.

=== Contemporary history ===
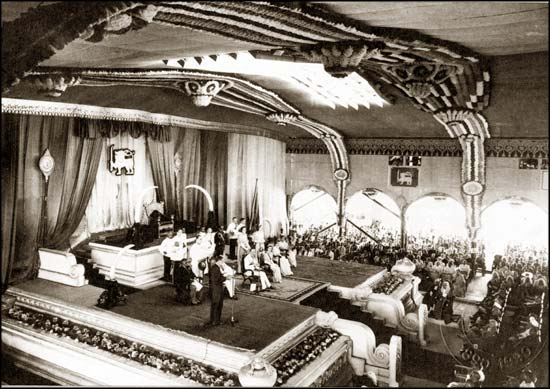
The formal ceremony marking the start of self-rule, with the opening of the first parliament at Independence Square

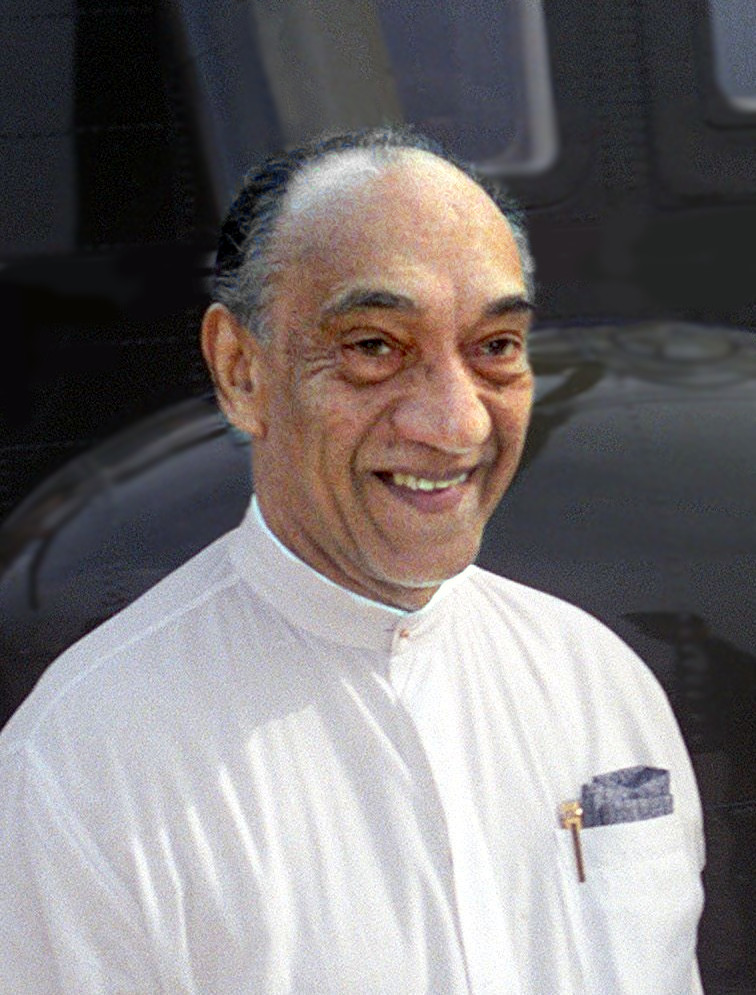
J. R. Jayewardene was the most influential political figure of Sri Lanka in the 1970s and 1980s.

The Soulbury constitution ushered in dominion status, with independence proclaimed on 4 February 1948. D. S. Senanayake became the first Prime Minister of Ceylon. Prominent Tamil leaders including Ponnambalam and Arunachalam Mahadeva joined his cabinet. The British Royal Navy remained stationed at Trincomalee until 1956. A countrywide popular demonstration against withdrawal of the rice rations resulted in the resignation of prime minister Dudley Senanayake.

S. W. R. D. Bandaranaike was elected prime minister in 1956. His three-year rule had a profound influence through his self-proclaimed role of "defender of the besieged Sinhalese culture". He introduced the controversial Sinhala Only Act, recognising Sinhala as the only official language of the government. Although partially reversed in 1958, the bill posed a grave concern for the Tamil community, which perceived in it a threat to their language and culture.

The Federal Party (FP) launched a movement of non-violent resistance (satyagraha) against the bill, which prompted Bandaranaike to reach an agreement (Bandaranaike–Chelvanayakam Pact) with S. J. V. Chelvanayakam, leader of the FP, to resolve the looming ethnic conflict. The pact proved ineffective in the face of ongoing protests by opposition and the Buddhist clergy. The bill, together with various government colonisation schemes, contributed much towards the political rancour between Sinhalese and Tamil political leaders. Bandaranaike was assassinated by an extremist Buddhist monk in 1959.

Leaders in 1960

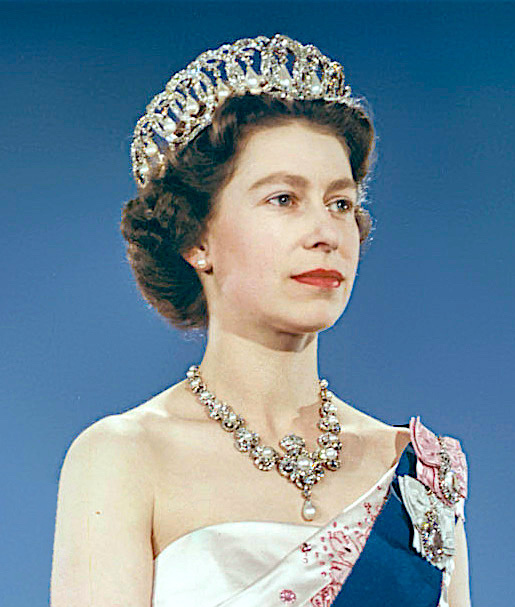
Elizabeth II
Queen of Ceylon

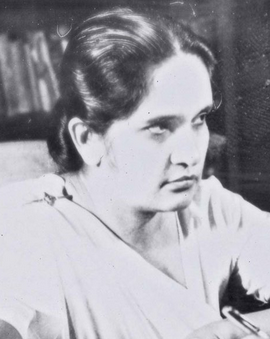
Sirimavo Bandaranaike
Prime Minister

1960 saw the election of Sirimavo Bandaranaike as Ceylon's Prime Minister and the first time in world history that the heads of both state and government in a country were female.

Sirimavo Bandaranaike, the widow of Bandaranaike, took office as prime minister in 1960, and withstood an attempted coup d'état in 1962. During her second term as prime minister, the government instituted socialist economic policies, strengthening ties with the Soviet Union and China, while promoting a policy of non-alignment. In 1971, Ceylon experienced a Marxist insurrection, which was quickly suppressed. In 1972, the country became a republic named Sri Lanka, repudiating its dominion status. Prolonged minority grievances and the use of communal emotionalism as an election campaign weapon by both Sinhalese and Tamil leaders abetted a fledgling Tamil militancy in the north during the 1970s. The policy of standardisation by the Sirimavo government to rectify disparities created in university enrolment, which was in essence an affirmative action to assist geographically disadvantaged students to obtain tertiary education, resulted in reducing the proportion of Tamil students at university level and acted as the immediate catalyst for the rise of militancy. The assassination of Jaffna Mayor Alfred Duraiyappah in 1975 by the Liberation Tigers of Tamil Eelam (LTTE) marked a crisis point.

The government of J. R. Jayawardene swept to power in 1977, defeating the United Front government. Jayawardene introduced a new constitution, together with a free-market economy and a powerful executive presidency modelled after that of France. It made Sri Lanka the first South Asian country to liberalise its economy. Beginning in 1983, ethnic tensions were manifested in an on-and-off insurgency against the government by the LTTE. An LTTE attack on 13 soldiers resulted in the start of a civil war, and in response anti-Tamil race riots took place, allegedly backed by Sinhalese hard-line ministers, which resulted in more than 150,000 Tamil civilians fleeing the island, seeking asylum in other countries.

Lapses in foreign policy resulted in India strengthening the Tigers by providing arms and training. In 1987, the Indo-Sri Lanka Accord was signed and the Indian Peace Keeping Force (IPKF) was deployed in northern Sri Lanka to stabilise the region by neutralising the LTTE. The same year, the JVP launched its second insurrection in Southern Sri Lanka, necessitating redeployment of the IPKF in 1990. In October 1990, the LTTE expelled Sri Lankan Moors (Muslims by religion) from northern Sri Lanka. In 2002, the Sri Lankan government and LTTE signed a Norwegian-mediated ceasefire agreement.

The 2004 Asian tsunami killed over 30,000 and displaced over 500,000 people in Sri Lanka.

From 1985 to 2006, the Sri Lankan government and Tamil insurgents held four rounds of peace talks without success. Both LTTE and the government resumed fighting in 2006, and the government officially backed out of the ceasefire in 2008. In 2009, under the Presidency of Mahinda Rajapaksa, the Sri Lanka Armed Forces defeated the LTTE, bringing an end to the 26-year-long civil war on 19 May 2009, and re-established control of the entire country by the Sri Lankan Government. Overall, between 60,000 and 100,000 people were killed during the course of the 26 year long conflict.

2019 Sri Lanka Easter bombings carried out by the terrorist group National Thowheeth Jama'ath on 21 April 2019 killed 261 people. On 26 April 2019 an anti terrorist operation was carried out against the National Thowheeth Jama'ath by the Sri Lanka Army with the operation being successful and National Thowheeth Jama'ath's insurgency ending.

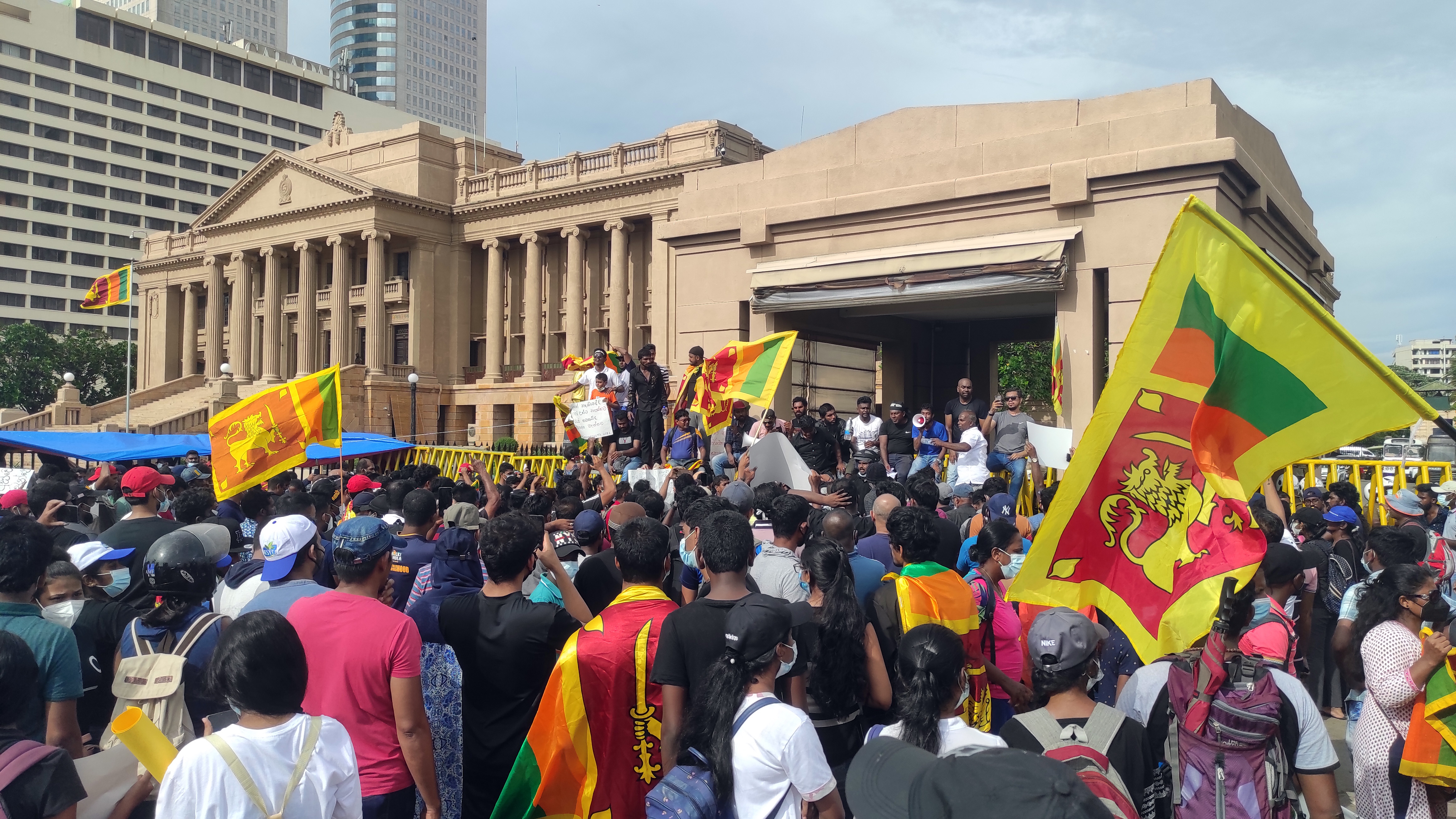
Sri Lankans protesting in front of the Presidential Secretariat in Colombo, 13 April 2022

Economic troubles in Sri Lanka began in 2019, when a severe economic crisis occurred caused by rapidly increasing foreign debt, massive government budget deficits due to tax cuts, falling foreign remittances, a food crisis caused by mandatory organic farming along with a ban on chemical fertilisers, and a multitude of other factors. The Sri Lankan Government officially declared the ongoing crisis to be the worst economic crisis in the country in 73 years. In August 2021, a food emergency was declared. In June 2022, Prime Minister Ranil Wickremesinghe declared the collapse of the Sri Lankan economy in parliament. The crisis resulted in Sri Lanka defaulting on its $51 billion sovereign debt for the first time in its history, along with double-digit inflation, a crippling energy crisis that led to approximately 15 hour power cuts, severe fuel shortages leading to the suspension of fuel to all non-essential vehicles, and more such economic disorder. Due to the crisis, massive street protests erupted all over the country, with protesters demanding the resignation of the President Gotabaya Rajapaksa. The protests culminated with the storming and siege of the President's House on 9 July 2022, and resulted in President Gotabaya Rajapaksa fleeing to Singapore and later emailing his resignation to parliament, formally announcing his resignation and making him the first Sri Lankan president to resign in the middle of his term. On the same day the President's House was stormed, protesters besieged and stormed the private residence of the prime minister and burnt it down.

After Parliament elected the new president as Ranil Wickremesinghe on 20 July 2022, Wickremesinghe took oath as the ninth President of Sri Lanka. He implemented various economic reforms in efforts to stabilise Sri Lanka's economy, which has shown slight improvement since. On 23 September 2024, Anura Kumara Dissanayake was sworn in as Sri Lanka's new president after winning the presidential election as a left-wing candidate. On 14 November 2024, President Anura Kumara Dissanayake's National People's Power (NPP), a left-leaning alliance, received a two-thirds majority in parliament in Sri Lankan parliamentary election.

== Geography ==
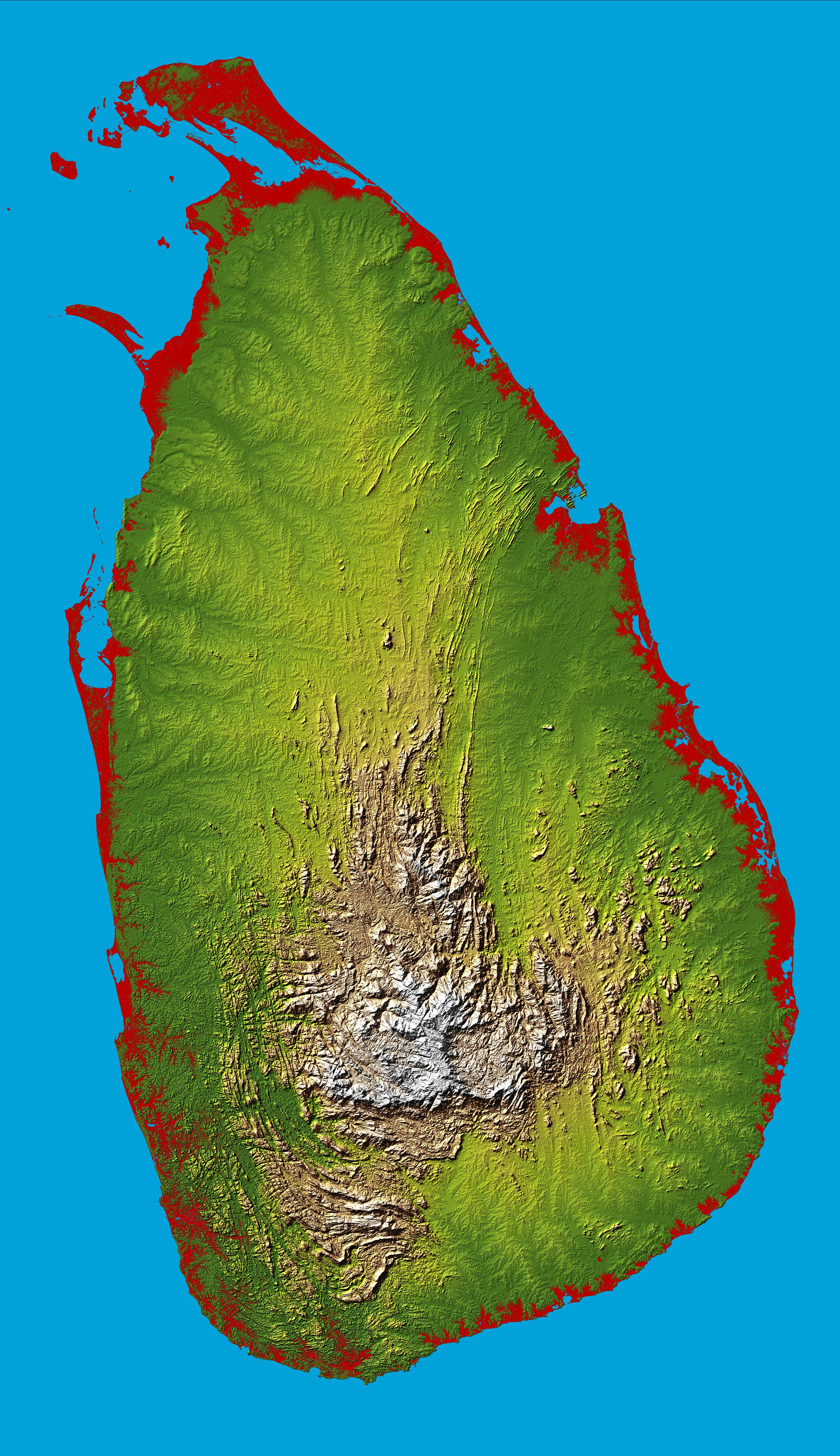
Topographic map of Sri Lanka

Sri Lanka, an island in South Asia, lies on the Indian Plate, a major tectonic plate that was formerly part of the Indo-Australian Plate. It is in the Indian Ocean southwest of the Bay of Bengal, between latitudes 5° and 10° N, and longitudes 79° and 82° E. Sri Lanka is separated from the mainland portion of the Indian subcontinent by the Gulf of Mannar and Palk Strait. According to Hindu mythology, a land bridge existed between the Indian mainland and Sri Lanka. It now amounts to only a chain of limestone shoals remaining above sea level. Legends claim that it was passable on foot up to 1480 CE, until cyclones deepened the channel. Portions are still as shallow as 1 metre (3 ft), hindering navigation. The island consists mostly of flat to rolling coastal plains, with mountains rising only in the south-central part. The highest point is Pidurutalagala, reaching 2,524 metres (8,281 ft) above sea level.

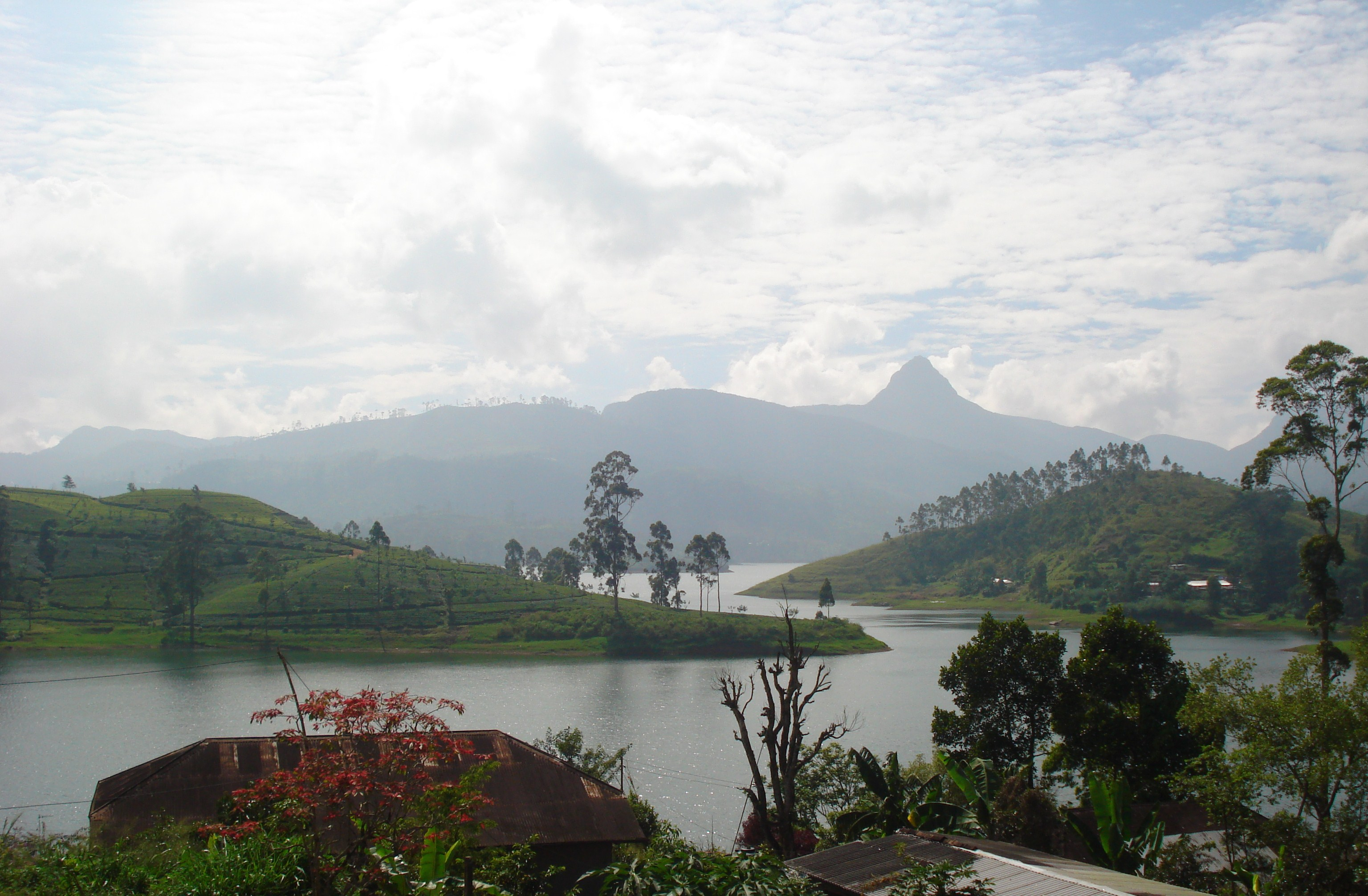
A view of Sripada from Maskeliya

Sri Lanka has 103 rivers. The longest of these is the Mahaweli River, extending 335 kilometres (208 mi). These waterways give rise to 51 natural waterfalls of 10 metres (33 ft) or more. The highest is Bambarakanda Falls, with a height of 263 metres (863 ft). Sri Lanka's coastline is 1,585 km (985 mi) long. Sri Lanka claims an exclusive economic zone extending 200 nautical miles, which is approximately 6.7 times Sri Lanka's land area. The coastline and adjacent waters support highly productive marine ecosystems such as fringing coral reefs and shallow beds of coastal and estuarine seagrasses.

Sri Lanka has 45 estuaries and 40 lagoons. Sri Lanka's mangrove ecosystem spans over 7,000 hectares and played a vital role in buffering the force of the waves in the 2004 Indian Ocean tsunami. The island is rich in minerals such as ilmenite, feldspar, graphite, silica, kaolin, mica and thorium. Existence of petroleum and gas in the Gulf of Mannar has also been confirmed, and the extraction of recoverable quantities is underway.

=== Climate ===
Sri Lanka map of Köppen climate classification

The climate is tropical and warm because of moderating effects of ocean winds. Mean temperatures range from 17 °C (62.6 °F) in the Central Highlands, where frost may occur for several days in the winter, to a maximum of 33 °C (91.4 °F) in low-altitude areas. Average yearly temperatures range from 28 °C (82.4 °F) to nearly 31 °C (87.8 °F). Day and night temperatures may vary by 14 °C (25 °F) to 18 °C (32 °F).

The rainfall pattern is influenced by monsoon winds from the Indian Ocean and Bay of Bengal. The "wet zone" and some of the windward slopes of the central highlands receive up to 2,500 millimetres (98.4 in) of rain each year, but the leeward slopes in the east and northeast receive little rain. Most of the east, southeast, and northern parts of Sri Lanka constitute the "dry zone", which receives between 1,200 and 1,900 mm (47 and 75 in) of rain annually.

The arid northwest and southeast coasts receive the least rain at 800 to 1,200 mm (31 to 47 in) per year. Periodic squalls occur and sometimes tropical cyclones bring overcast skies and rains to the southwest, northeast, and eastern parts of the island. Humidity is typically higher in the southwest and mountainous areas and depends on the seasonal patterns of rainfall. An increase in average rainfall coupled with heavier rainfall events has resulted in recurrent flooding and related damages to infrastructure, utility supply and the urban economy.

=== Flora and fauna ===
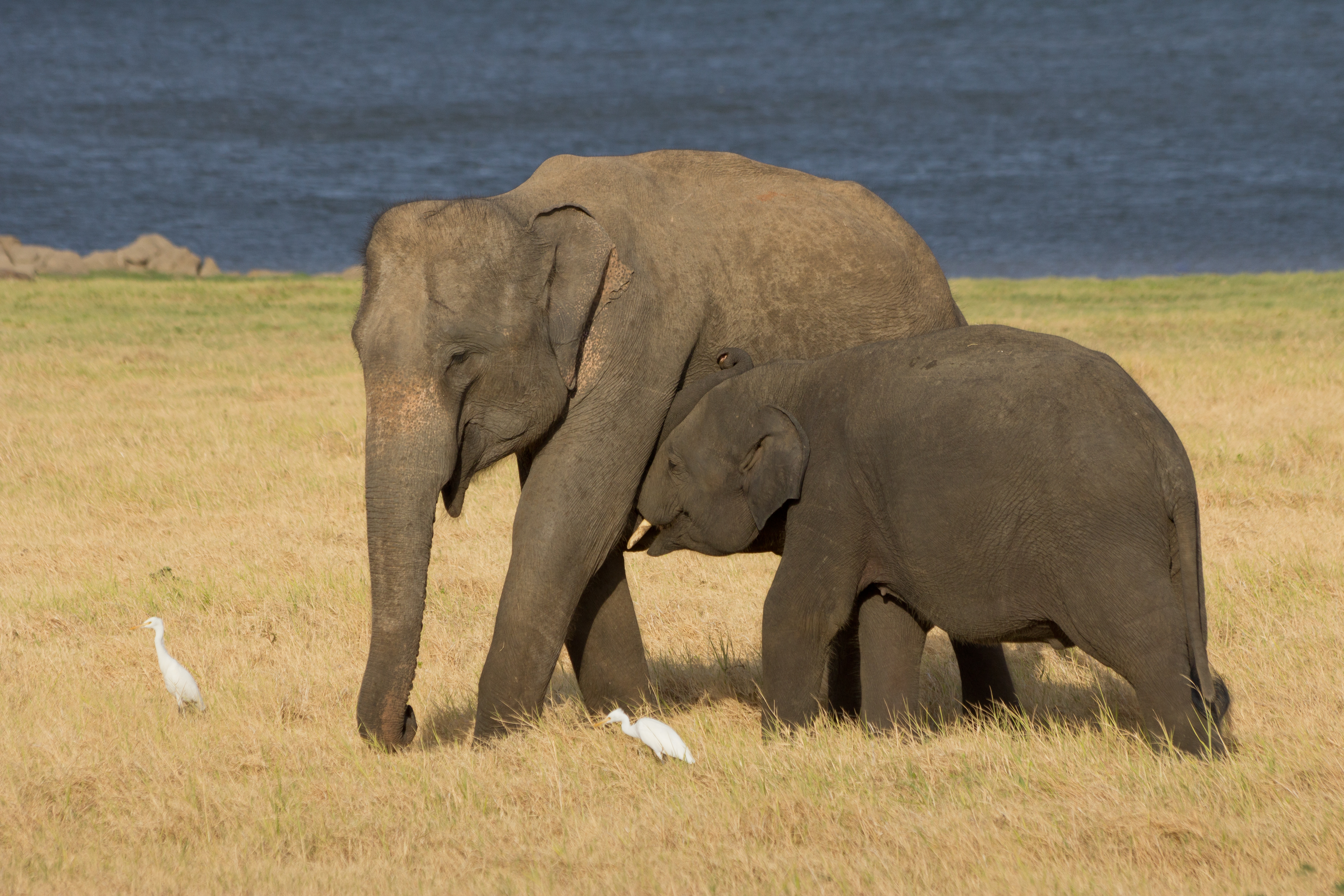
The Sri Lankan elephant is one of three recognised subspecies of the Asian elephant. The 2011 elephant census estimated a population of 5,879.

The Western Ghats of India and Sri Lanka were included among the first 18 global biodiversity hotspots due to high levels of species endemism. The number of biodiversity hotspots has now increased to 34. Sri Lanka has the highest biodiversity per unit area among Asian countries for flowering plants and all vertebrate groups except birds. A remarkably high proportion of the species among its flora and fauna, 27% of the 3,210 flowering plants and 22% of the mammals, are endemic. Sri Lanka supports a rich avifauna of that stands at 453 species and this includes 240 species of birds that are known to breed in the country. 33 species are accepted by some ornithologists as endemic while some ornithologists consider only 27 are endemic and the remaining six are considered as proposed endemics. Sri Lanka's protected areas are administered by two government bodies: The Department of Forest Conservation and the Department of Wildlife Conservation. Department of Wildlife Conservation administers 61 wildlife sanctuaries, 22 national parks, four nature reserves, three strict nature reserves, and one jungle corridor; while Department of Forest Conservation oversees 65 conservation forests and one national heritage wilderness area. 26.5% of the country's land area is legally protected. This is a higher percentage of protected areas when compared to the rest of Asia.

Sri Lanka contains four terrestrial ecoregions: Sri Lanka lowland rain forests, Sri Lanka montane rain forests, Sri Lanka dry-zone dry evergreen forests, and Deccan thorn scrub forests. Flowering acacias flourish on the arid Jaffna Peninsula. Among the trees of the dry-land forests are valuable species such as satinwood, ebony, ironwood, mahogany and teak. The wet zone is a tropical evergreen forest with tall trees, broad foliage, and a dense undergrowth of vines and creepers. Subtropical evergreen forests resembling those of temperate climates flourish in the higher altitudes.

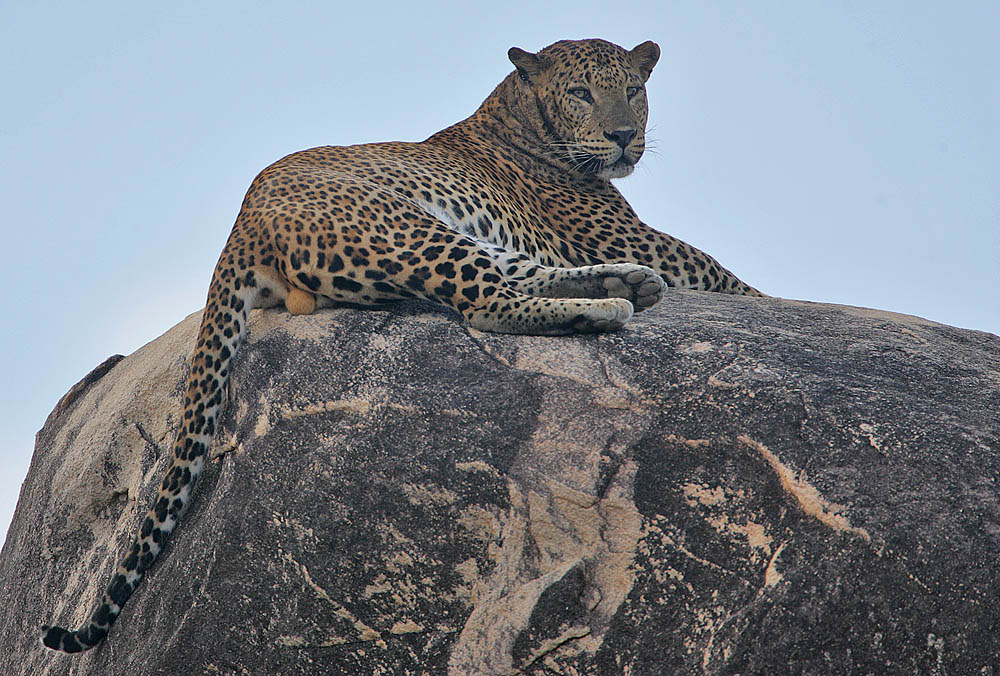
The Sri Lankan leopard (Panthera pardus kotiya) is an endangered subspecies of leopard native to Sri Lanka.

Yala National Park in the southeast protects herds of elephant, deer, and peacocks. The Wilpattu National Park in the northwest, the largest national park, preserves the habitats of many water birds such as storks, pelicans, ibis, and spoonbills. The island has four biosphere reserves: Bundala, Hurulu Forest Reserve, the Kanneliya-Dediyagala-Nakiyadeniya, and Sinharaja. Sinharaja is home to 26 endemic birds and 20 rainforest species, including the elusive red-faced malkoha, the green-billed coucal and the Sri Lanka blue magpie. The untapped genetic potential of Sinharaja flora is enormous. Of the 211 woody trees and lianas within the reserve, 139 (66%) are endemic. The total vegetation density, including trees, shrubs, herbs, and seedlings, has been estimated at 240,000 individuals per hectare. The Minneriya National Park borders the Minneriya Tank, which is an important source of water for elephants inhabiting the surrounding forests. Dubbed "The Gathering", the congregation of elephants can be seen on the tank-bed in the late dry season (August to October) as the surrounding water sources steadily disappear. The park also encompasses a range of micro-habitats which include classic dry zone tropical monsoonal evergreen forest, thick stands of giant bamboo, hilly pastures (patanas), and grasslands (talawas).

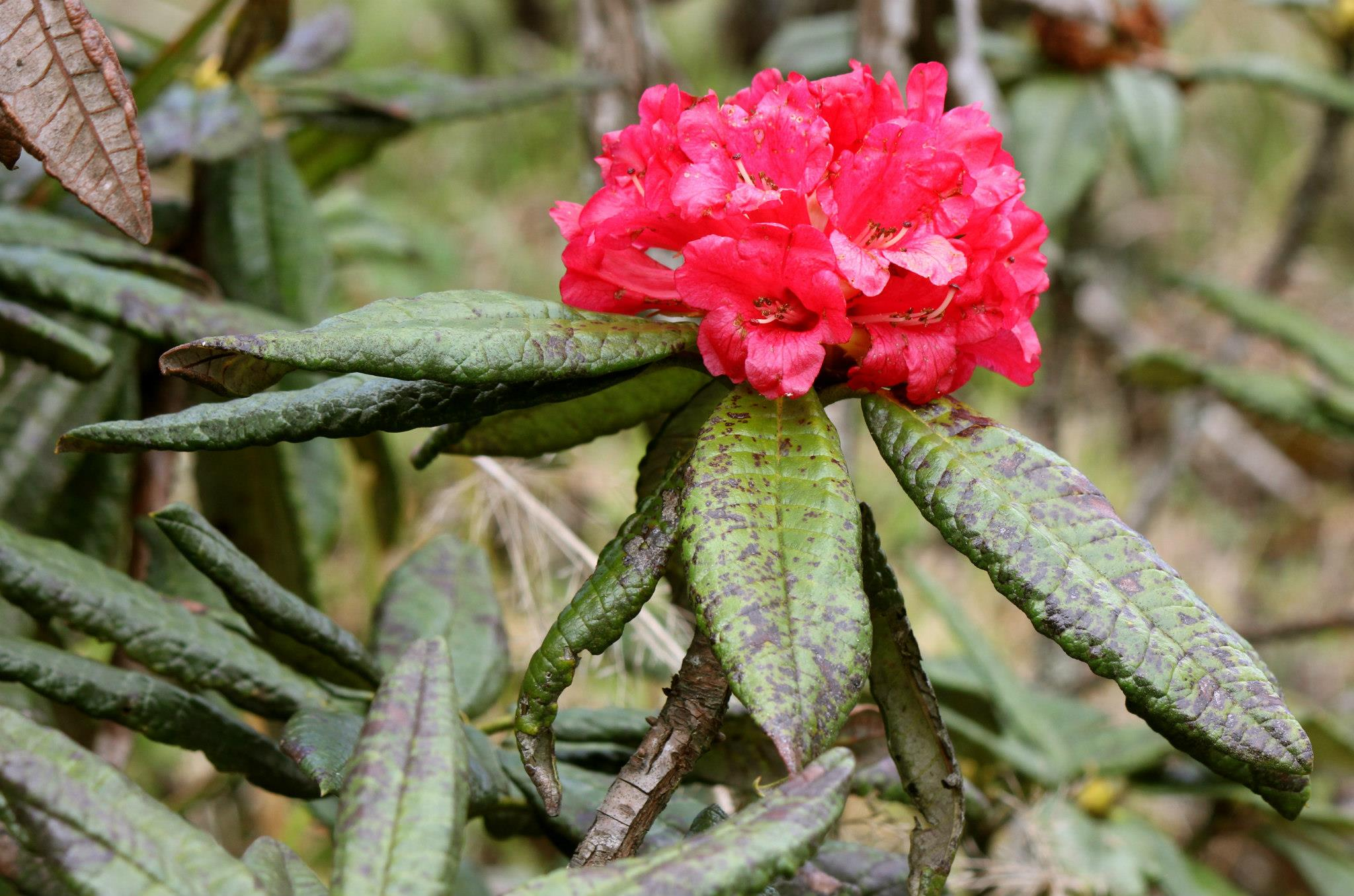
Maha rath mala (Rhododendron arboreum ssp. zeylanicum) is a rare sub-species of Rhododendron arboreum found in Central Highlands of Sri Lanka.

During the Mahaweli Programme of the 1970s and 1980s in northern Sri Lanka, the government set aside four areas of land totalling 1,900 km^{2} (730 sq mi) as national parks. Statistics of Sri Lanka's forest cover show rapid deforestation from 1956 to 2010. In 1956, 44.2 percent of the country's land area had forest cover. Forest cover depleted rapidly in recent decades; 29.6 percent in 1999, 28.7 percent in 2010.

== Government and politics ==
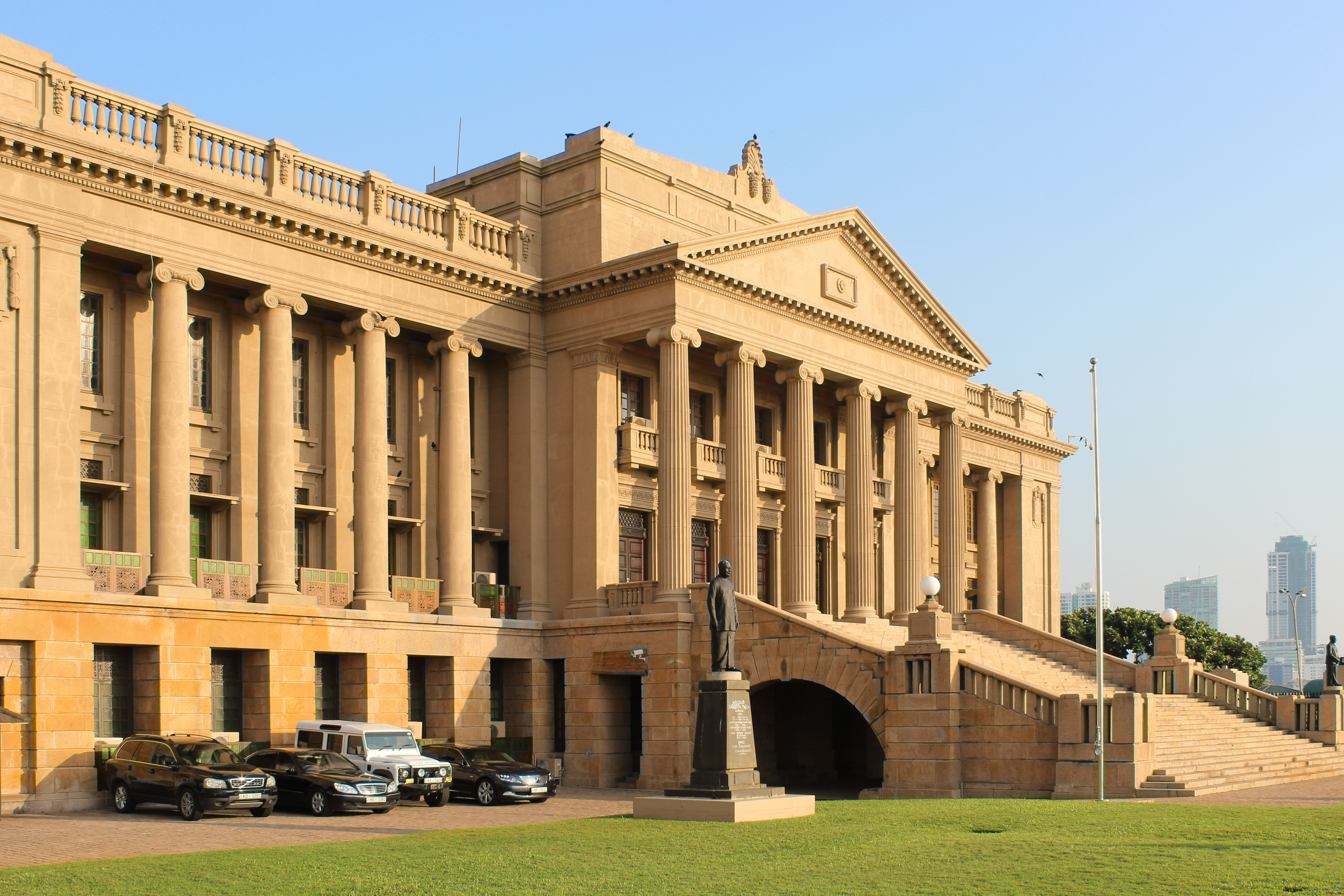
The old Sri Lankan Parliament building, near the Galle Face Green in Colombo. It now serves as the Presidential Secretariat's headquarters.

Sri Lanka is a democratic republic and a unitary state which is governed by a semi-presidential system. Sri Lanka is the oldest democracy in Asia. Most provisions of the constitution can be amended by a two-thirds majority in parliament. The amendment of certain fundamental features, including clauses on national symbols, religion, term limits, the reference to Sri Lanka as a unitary state, and the entrenchment mechanism itself, requires both a two-thirds majority in Parliament and approval in a nationwide referendum. The Constitution of Sri Lanka officially declares it to be a socialist state.

In common with many democracies, the Sri Lankan government has three branches:

- Executive: The President of Sri Lanka is the head of state; the commander in chief of the armed forces; chief executive, and is popularly elected for a five-year term. The president heads the cabinet and appoints ministers from elected members of parliament. The president is immune from legal proceedings while in the office with respect to any acts done or omitted to be done by him or her in either an official or private capacity. Following the passage of the 19th amendment to the constitution in 2015, the president has two terms, which previously stood at no term limit.
- Legislative: The Parliament of Sri Lanka is a unicameral 225-member legislature with 196 members elected from 22 multi-seat constituencies and 29 elected by proportional representation. Members are elected by universal suffrage for a five-year term. The president may summon, suspend, or end a legislative session and dissolve Parliament anytime after four and a half years. The parliament reserves the power to make all laws. The president's deputy and head of government, the prime minister, leads the ruling party in parliament and shares many executive responsibilities, mainly in domestic affairs.

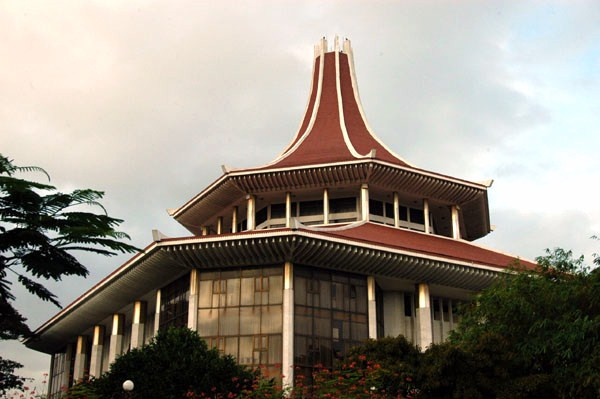
The Supreme Court of Sri Lanka, Colombo

- Judicial: Sri Lanka's judiciary consists of a Supreme Court—the highest and final superior court of record, a Court of Appeal, High Courts, and a number of subordinate courts. The highly complex legal system reflects diverse cultural influences. Criminal law is based almost entirely on British law. Basic civil law derives from Roman-Dutch law. Laws pertaining to marriage, divorce, and inheritance are communal. Because of ancient customary practices and religion, the Sinhala customary law (Kandyan law), the Thesavalamai, and Sharia law are followed in special cases. The president appoints judges to the Supreme Court, the Court of Appeal, and the High Courts. A judicial service commission, composed of the chief justice and two Supreme Court judges, appoints, transfers, and dismisses lower court judges.

=== Politics ===
National symbols of Sri Lanka
- Flag: Lion Flag
- Emblem: Gold Lion Passant
- Anthem: "Sri Lanka Matha"
- Butterfly: Sri Lankan birdwing
- Animal: Grizzled giant squirrel
- Bird: Sri Lanka junglefowl
- Flower: Blue water lily
- Tree: Ceylon ironwood (nā)
- Sport: Volleyball

The current political culture in Sri Lanka is a contest between two rival coalitions led by the centre-left and progressive United People's Freedom Alliance (UPFA), an offspring of Sri Lanka Freedom Party (SLFP), and the comparatively right-wing and pro-capitalist United National Party (UNP). After 2018, two major political parties split from these two parties: The Samagi Jana Balawegaya split from the UNP, and the Sri Lanka Podujana Peramuna split from the UPFA. The third wing party Janatha Vimukthi Peramuna has gained popularity since 2022.

Sri Lanka is essentially a multi-party democracy with many smaller Buddhist, socialist, and Tamil nationalist political parties. As of July 2011, the number of registered political parties in the country is 67. Of these, the Lanka Sama Samaja Party (LSSP), established in 1935, is the oldest.

The UNP, established by D. S. Senanayake in 1946, was until recently the largest single political party. It is the only political group which had representation in all parliaments since independence. SLFP was founded by S. W. R. D. Bandaranaike in July 1951. SLFP registered its first victory in 1956, defeating the ruling UNP in the 1956 Parliamentary election. Following the parliamentary election in July 1960, Sirimavo Bandaranaike became the prime minister and the world's first elected female head of government.

G. G. Ponnambalam, the Tamil nationalist counterpart of S. W. R. D. Bandaranaike, founded the All Ceylon Tamil Congress (ACTC) in 1944. Objecting to Ponnambalam's cooperation with D. S. Senanayake, a dissident group led by S.J.V. Chelvanayakam broke away in 1949 and formed the Illankai Tamil Arasu Kachchi (ITAK), also known as the Federal Party, becoming the main Tamil political party in Sri Lanka for the next two decades. The Federal Party advocated a more aggressive stance toward the Sinhalese. With the constitutional reforms of 1972, the ACTC and ITAK created the Tamil United Front (later Tamil United Liberation Front). Following a period of turbulence as Tamil militants rose to power in the late 1970s, these Tamil political parties were succeeded in October 2001 by the Tamil National Alliance. Janatha Vimukthi Peramuna, a Marxist–Leninist political party founded by Rohana Wijeweera in 1965, serves as a third force in the current political context. It endorses leftist policies which are more radical than the traditionalist leftist politics of the LSSP and the Communist Party. Founded in 1981, the Sri Lanka Muslim Congress is the largest Muslim political party in Sri Lanka.

President Mahinda Rajapaksa lost the 2015 presidential elections, ending his ten-year presidency. However, his successor as Sri Lankan President, Maithripala Sirisena, decided not to seek re-election in 2019. The Rajapaksa family regained power in November 2019 presidential elections when Mahinda's younger brother and former wartime defence chief Gotabaya Rajapaksa won the election, and he was later sworn in as the new president of Sri Lanka. Their firm grip of power was consolidated in the parliamentary elections in August 2020. The family's political party, Sri Lanka People's Front (known by its Sinhala initials SLPP), obtained a landslide victory and a clear majority in the parliament. Five members of the Rajapaksa family won seats in the new parliament. Former president Mahinda Rajapaksa became the new prime minister.

In 2022, a political crisis started due to the power struggle between President Gotabaya Rajapaksa and the Parliament of Sri Lanka. The crisis was fuelled by anti-government protests and demonstrations by the public and also due to the worsening economy of Sri Lanka since 2019. The anti-government sentiment across various parts of Sri Lanka has triggered unprecedented political instability, creating shockwaves in the political arena.

On 20 July 2022, Ranil Wickremesinghe was elected as the ninth President via a parliamentarian election. President Ranil Wickremesinghe was defeated by left-leaning Anura Kumara Dissanayake in 2024 presidential elections.

=== Administrative divisions ===
For administrative purposes, Sri Lanka is divided into nine provinces and twenty-five districts.

==== Provinces ====
Provinces in Sri Lanka have existed since the 19th century, but they had no legal status until 1987 when the 13th Amendment of the 1978 constitution established provincial councils after several decades of increasing demand for a decentralisation of the government. Each provincial council is an autonomous body not under the authority of any ministry. Some of its functions had been undertaken by central government ministries, departments, corporations, and statutory authorities, but authority over land and police is not as a rule given to provincial councils. Between 1989 and 2006, the Northern and Eastern provinces were temporarily merged to form the North-East Province. Prior to 1987, all administrative tasks for the provinces were handled by a district-based civil service which had been in place since colonial times. Now each province is administered by a directly elected provincial council:

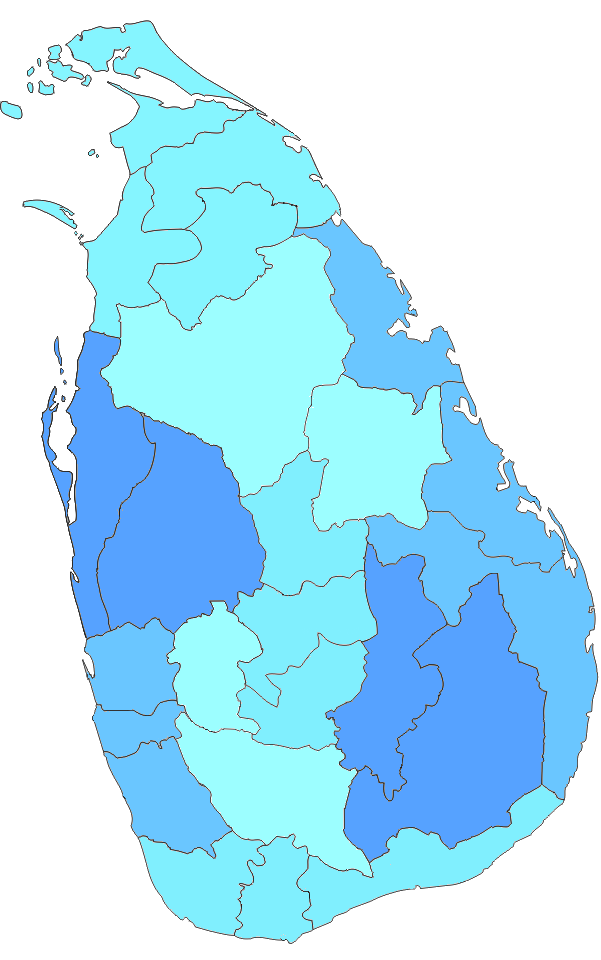

Province	Capital	Area (km^{2})	Population (2024)	Density (Persons per km^{2})	Provincial GDP share (%) (2023)	Sri Lanka Prosperity Index (2021)
Central	Kandy	5,674	2,712,804	453	10.3	0.559
Eastern	Trincomalee	9,996	1,782,050	155	4.7	0.519
North Central	Anuradhapura	10,714	1,406,890	118	4.8	0.521
North Western	Kurunegala	7,812	2,578,894	305	10.9	0.541
Northern	Jaffna	8,884	1,149,240	119	4.5	0.564
Sabaragamuwa	Ratnapura	4,902	2,015,039	393	7.0	0.499
Southern	Galle	5,559	2,605,506	446	9.3	0.582
Uva	Badulla	8,488	1,399,049	149	4.7	0.468
Western	Colombo	3,709	6,113,698	1,578	43.7	0.802
Sri Lanka	Sri Jayawardenepura Kotte and Colombo	65,610	21,763,170	310	100	0.796

==== Districts and local authorities ====
Each district is administered under a district secretariat. The districts are further subdivided into 256 divisional secretariats, and these to approximately 14,008 Grama Niladhari divisions. The districts are known in Sinhala as disa and in Tamil as māwaddam. Originally, a disa (usually rendered into English as Dissavony) was a duchy, notably Matale and Uva.

There are three other types of local authorities: municipal councils (18), urban councils (13) and pradeshiya sabha, also called pradesha sabhai (256). Local authorities were originally based on feudal counties named korale and rata, and were formerly known as "D.R.O. divisions" after the divisional revenue officer. Later, the D.R.O.s became "assistant government agents", and the divisions were known as "A.G.A. divisions". These divisional secretariats are currently administered by a divisional secretary.

=== Foreign relations ===
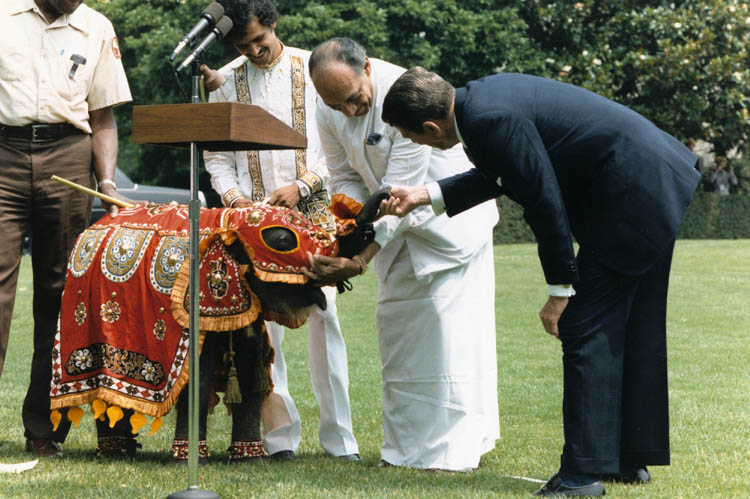
President J. R. Jayewardene gifting Jayathu, a baby elephant to US President Ronald Reagan in 1984

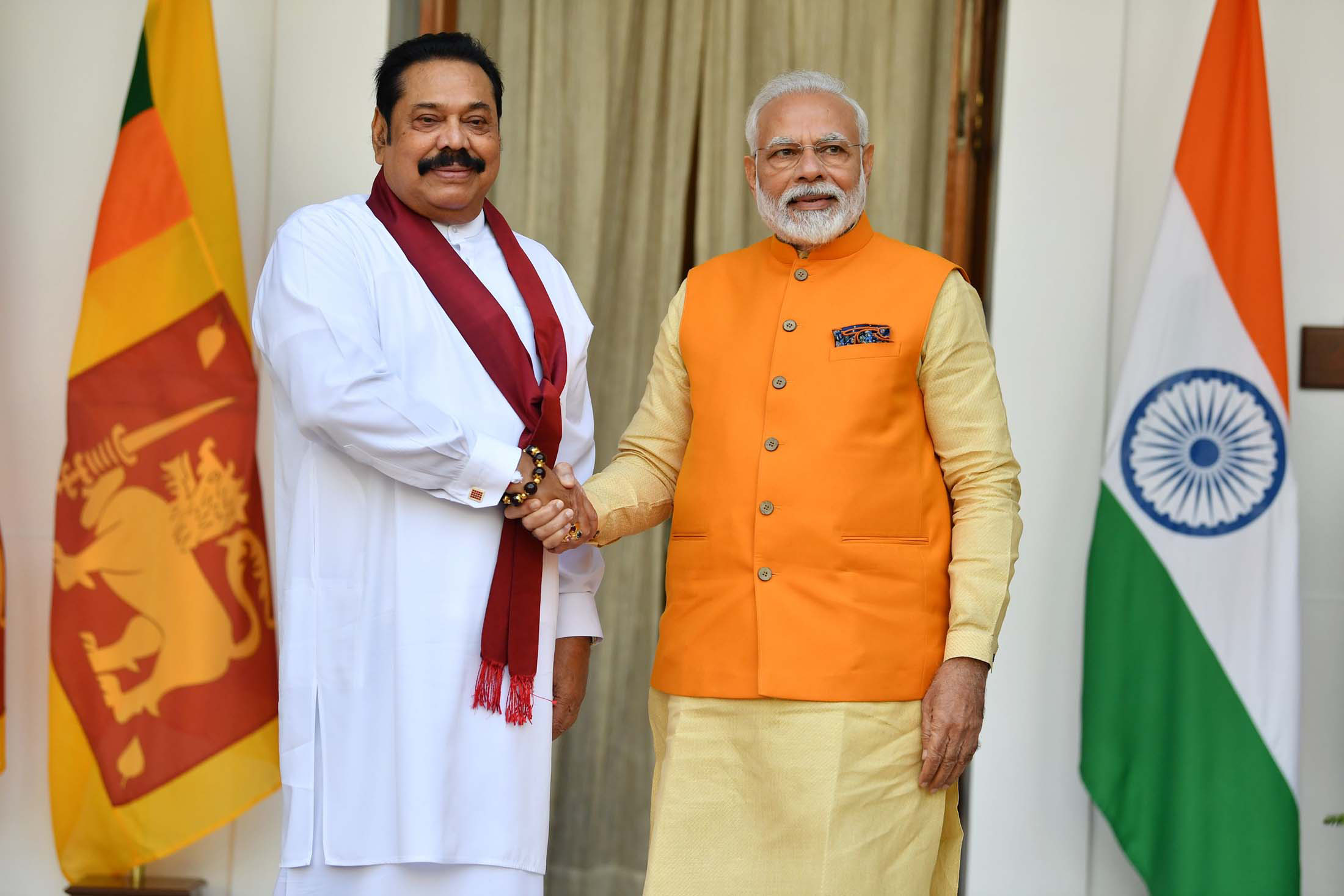
Sri Lankan Prime Minister Mahinda Rajapaksa with Indian Prime Minister Narendra Modi in 2020

Sri Lanka is a founding member of the Non-Aligned Movement (NAM). While ensuring that it maintains its independence, Sri Lanka has cultivated relations with India. Sri Lanka became a member of the United Nations in 1955. Today, it is also a member of the Commonwealth, the SAARC, the World Bank, the International Monetary Fund, the Asian Development Bank, and the Colombo Plan.

The United National Party has traditionally favoured links with the West, while the Sri Lanka Freedom Party has favoured links with the East. Sri Lankan Finance Minister J. R. Jayewardene, together with then Australian Foreign Minister Sir Percy Spencer, proposed the Colombo Plan at the Commonwealth Foreign Minister's Conference held in Colombo in 1950. At the San Francisco Peace Conference in 1951, while many countries were reluctant, Sri Lanka argued for a free Japan and refused to accept payment of reparations for World War II damage because it believed it would harm Japan's economy. Sri Lanka-China relations started as soon as the People's Republic of China was formed in 1949. The two countries signed an important Rubber-Rice Pact in 1952. Sri Lanka played a vital role at the Asian–African Conference in 1955, which was an important step in the crystallisation of the NAM.

The Bandaranaike government of 1956 significantly changed the pro-western policies set by the previous UNP government. It recognised Cuba under Fidel Castro in 1959. Shortly afterward, Cuba's revolutionary Che Guevara paid a visit to Sri Lanka. The Sirima-Shastri Pact of 1964 and Sirima-Gandhi Pact of 1974 were signed between Sri Lankan and Indian leaders in an attempt to solve the long-standing dispute over the status of plantation workers of Indian origin. In 1974, Kachchatheevu, a small island in Palk Strait, was formally ceded to Sri Lanka. By this time, Sri Lanka was strongly involved in the NAM, and the fifth NAM summit was held in Colombo in 1976. The relationship between Sri Lanka and India became tense under the government of J. R. Jayawardene. To this end, Sri Lanka had briefly adopted a 'Look East' policy, and at one point pursued ASEAN membership over joining SAARC. Further deterioration led to the Indian intervention in the Sri Lankan Civil War and subsequently deployed an Indian Peace Keeping Force in 1987. In the present, Sri Lanka enjoys extensive relations with China, Russia, and Pakistan.

=== Military ===
The Sri Lanka Armed Forces, comprising the Sri Lanka Army, the Sri Lanka Navy, and the Sri Lanka Air Force, come under the purview of the Ministry of Defence. The total strength of the three services is about 346,000 personnel, with nearly 36,000 reserves. Sri Lanka has not enforced military conscription. Paramilitary units include the Special Task Force, the Civil Security Force, and the Sri Lanka Coast Guard.

Since independence in 1948, the primary focus of the armed forces has been internal security, crushing three major insurgencies, two by Marxist militants of the JVP and a 26-year-long conflict with the LTTE. The armed forces have been in a continuous mobilised state for the last 30 years. The Sri Lankan Armed Forces have engaged in United Nations peacekeeping operations since the early 1960s, contributing forces to permanent contingents deployed in several UN peacekeeping missions in Chad, Lebanon, and Haiti.

Sri Lanka is the 100th most peaceful country in the world, according to the 2024 Global Peace Index.

=== Human rights ===
Officially, the constitution of Sri Lanka guarantees human rights as ratified by the United Nations. However, several groups, such as Amnesty International, Freedom from Torture, Human Rights Watch, as well as the British government and the United States Department of State have criticised human rights violations in Sri Lanka. The Sri Lankan Government and the LTTE have both been accused of violating human rights. A report by an advisory panel to the UN secretary-general accused both the LTTE and the Sri Lankan government of war crimes during the final stages of the civil war. Corruption remains a problem in Sri Lanka, and there is little protection for those who stand up against corruption. The 135-year-old Article 365 of the Sri Lankan Penal Code criminalises homosexual acts, with a penalty of up to ten years in prison.

The UN Human Rights Council has documented over 12,000 named individuals who have disappeared after detention by security forces in Sri Lanka, the second-highest figure in the world since the Working Group came into being in 1980. The Sri Lankan government confirmed that 6,445 of these died. Allegations of human rights abuses have not ended with the close of the ethnic conflict.

UN Human Rights Commissioner Navanethem Pillay visited Sri Lanka in May 2013. After her visit, she said: "The war may have ended [in Sri Lanka], but in the meantime, democracy has been undermined and the rule of law eroded." Pillay spoke about the military's increasing involvement in civilian life and reports of military land grabbing. She also said that, while in Sri Lanka, she had been allowed to go wherever she wanted, but that Sri Lankans who came to meet her were harassed and intimidated by security forces.

In 2012, the UK charity Freedom from Torture reported that it had received 233 referrals of torture survivors from Sri Lanka for clinical treatment or other services provided by the charity. In the same year, the group published Out of the Silence, which documents evidence of torture in Sri Lanka and demonstrates that the practice has continued long after the end of the civil war in 2009. On 29 July 2020, Human Rights Watch said that the Sri Lanka government has targeted lawyers, human rights defenders, and journalists to suppress criticism against the government.

== Economy ==
Development of real GDP per capita, 1820 to 2018

According to the International Monetary Fund, Sri Lanka's GDP in terms of purchasing power parity is the second highest in the South Asian region in terms of per capita income. In the 19th and 20th centuries, Sri Lanka became a plantation economy famous for its production and export of cinnamon, rubber, and Ceylon tea, which remains a trademark national export. The development of modern ports under British rule raised the strategic importance of the island as a centre of trade. From 1948 to 1977, socialism strongly influenced the government's economic policies. Colonial plantations were dismantled, industries were nationalised, and a welfare state established. In 1977, the free market economy was introduced to the country, incorporating privatisation, deregulation, and the promotion of private enterprise.

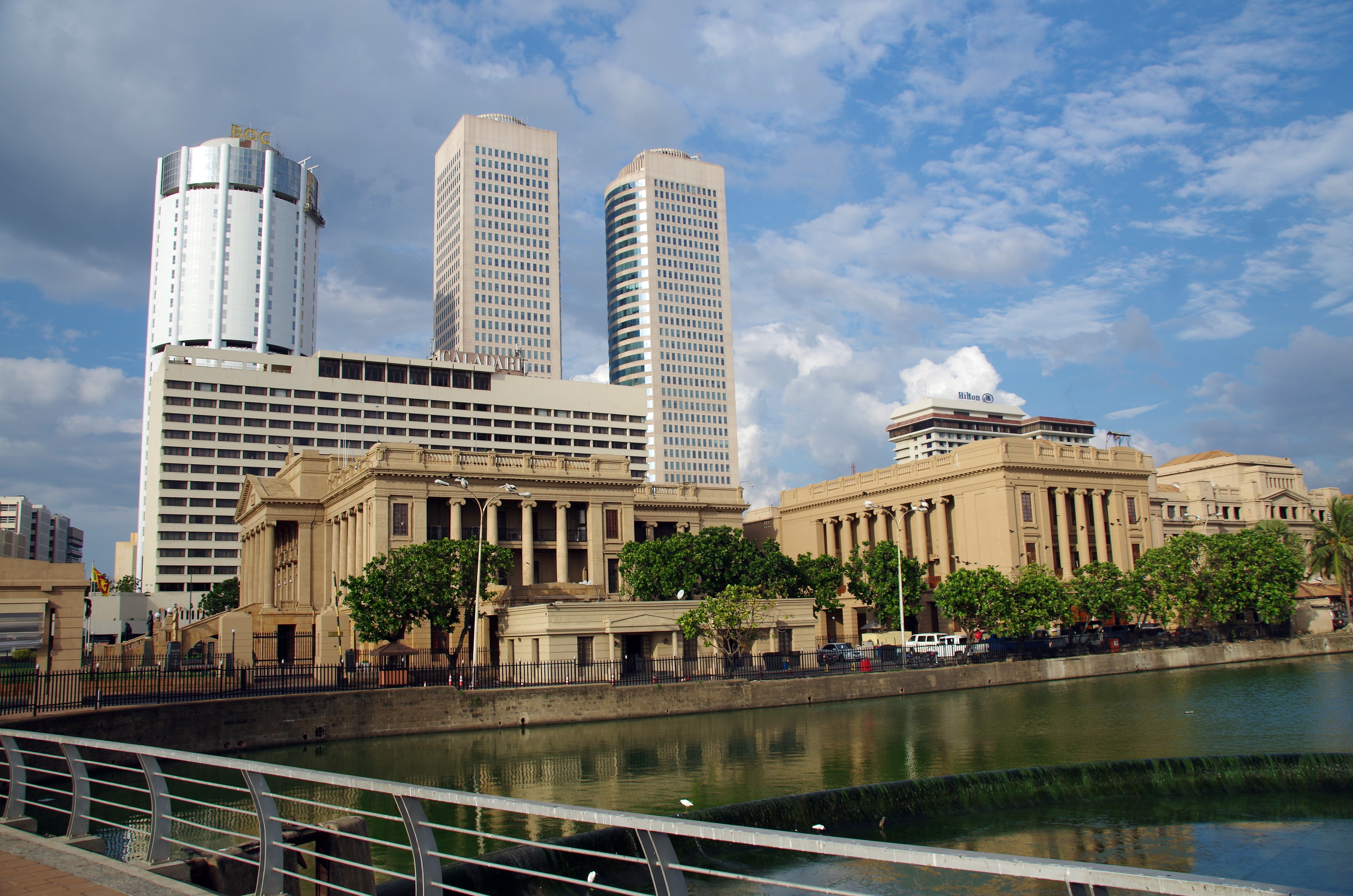
The World Trade Center in Colombo. Presidential Secretariat, Bank of Ceylon and Galadari Hotel are also visible in the image.

While the production and export of tea, rubber, coffee, sugar, and other commodities remain important, industrialisation has increased the importance of food processing, textiles, telecommunications, and finance. The country's main economic sectors are tourism, tea export, clothing, rice production, and other agricultural products. In addition to these economic sectors, overseas employment, especially in the Middle East, contributes substantially in foreign exchange.

As of 2020, the service sector makes up 59.7% of GDP, the industrial sector 26.2%, and the agriculture sector 8.4%. The private sector accounts for 85% of the economy. China, India and the United States are Sri Lanka's largest trading partners. Economic disparities exist between the provinces with the Western Province contributing 45.1% of the GDP and the Southern Province and the Central Province contributing 10.7% and 10%, respectively. With the end of the war, the Northern Province reported a record 22.9% GDP growth in 2010.

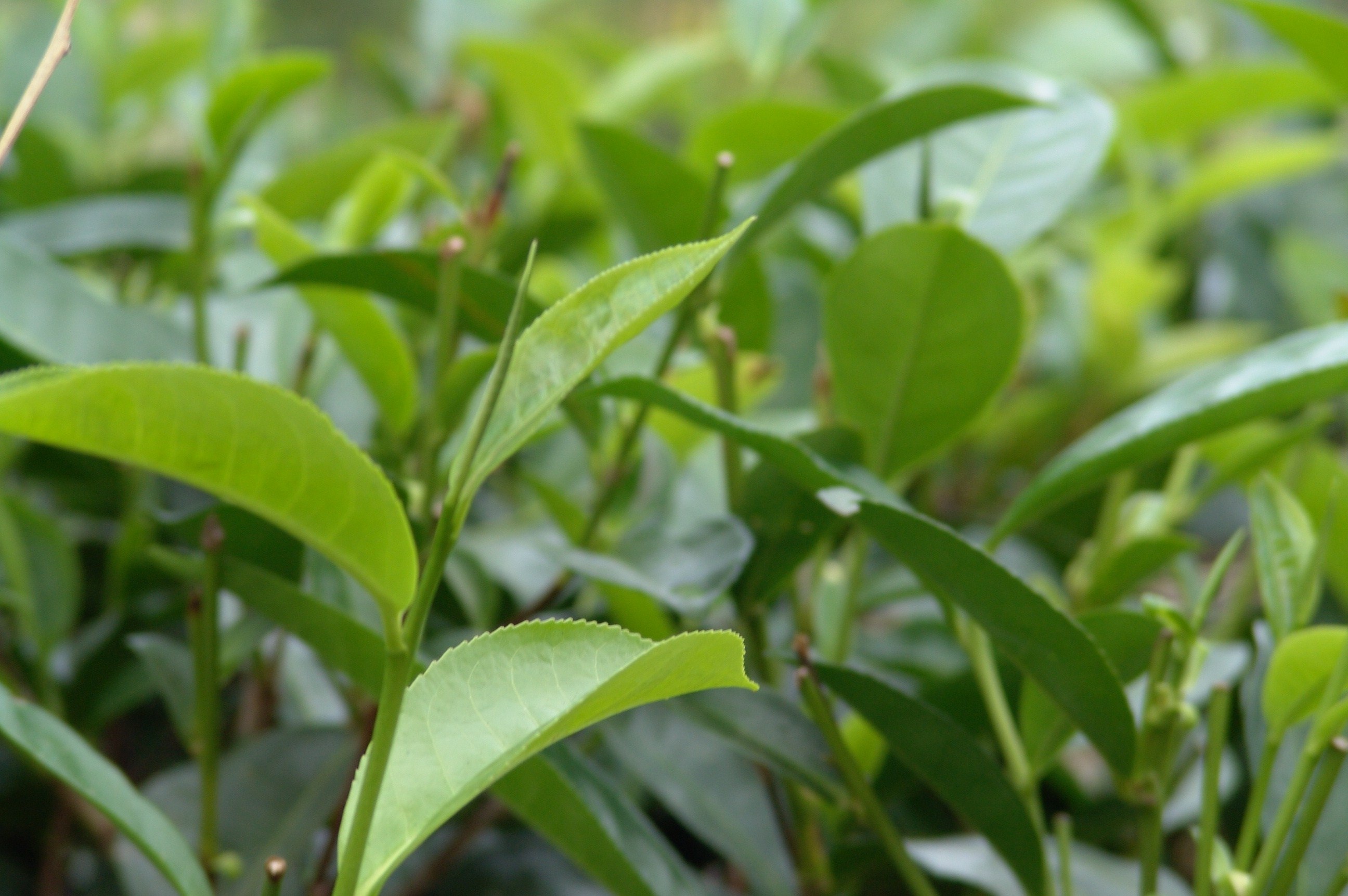
Sri Lanka's most widely known export, Ceylon tea, which ISO considers the cleanest tea in the world in terms of pesticide residues. Sri Lanka is also the world's 3rd largest exporter of tea.

The per capita income of Sri Lanka doubled from 2005 to 2011. During the same period, poverty dropped from 15.2% to 7.6%, unemployment rate dropped from 7.2% to 4.9%, market capitalisation of the Colombo Stock Exchange quadrupled, and the budget deficit doubled. 99% of the households in Sri Lanka are electrified; 93.2% of the population have access to safe drinking water; and 53.1% have access to pipe-borne water. Income inequality has also dropped in recent years, indicated by a Gini coefficient of 0.36 in 2010.

In 2016, Sri Lanka ranked 5th in the World Giving Index, registering high levels of contentment and charitable behaviour in its society. In 2010, The New York Times placed Sri Lanka at the top of its list of 31 places to visit. S&P Dow Jones Indices classifies Sri Lanka as a frontier market as of 2018. Sri Lanka ranks well above other South Asian countries in the Human Development Index (HDI) with an index of 0.750.

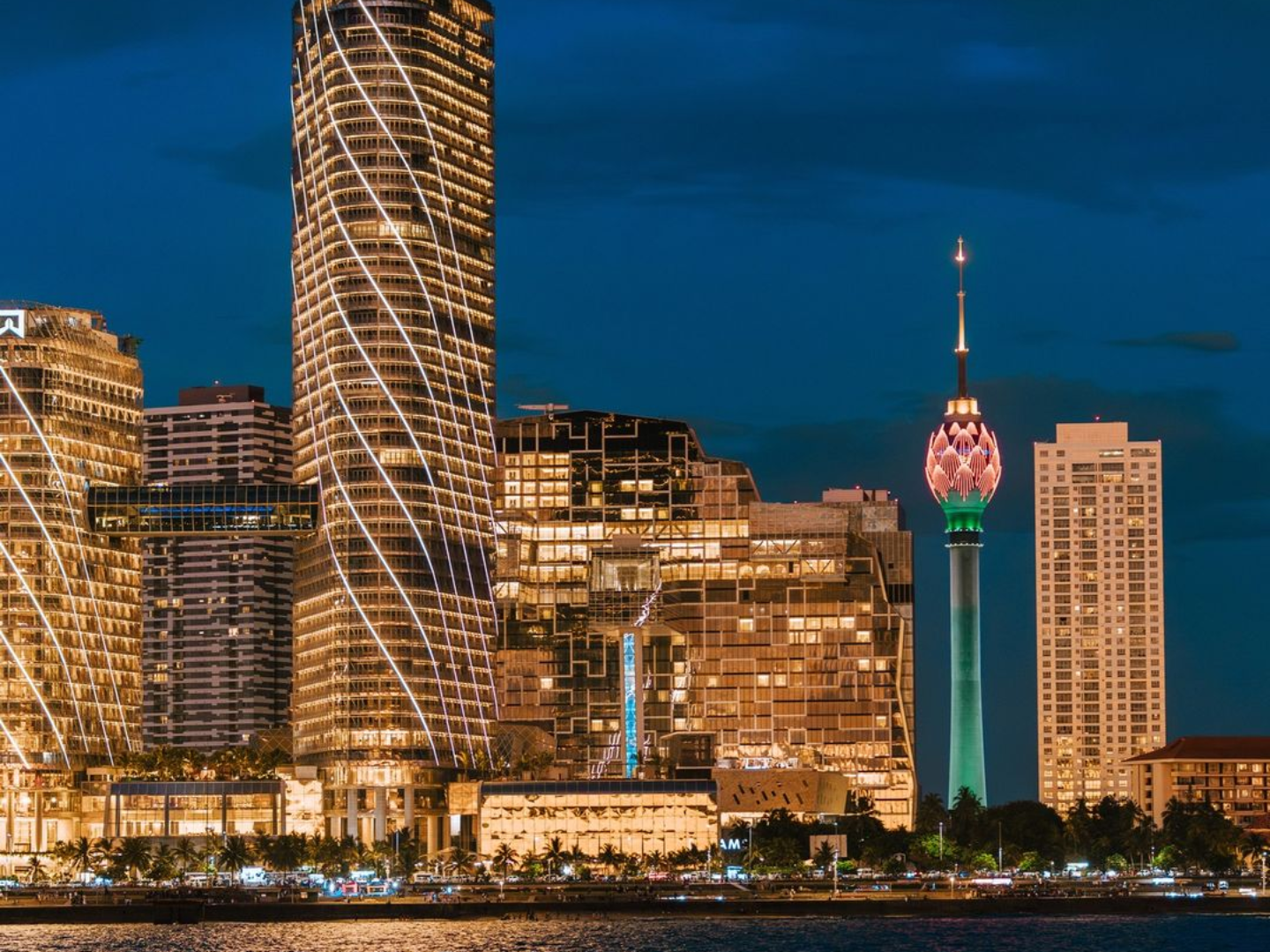
Sri Lanka's commercial capital Colombo city at night, in 2024

By 2016, the country's debt soared as it was developing its infrastructure to the point of near bankruptcy which required a bailout from the International Monetary Fund (IMF). The IMF had agreed to provide a US$1.5 billion bailout loan in April 2016 after Sri Lanka provided a set of criteria intended to improve its economy. By the fourth quarter of 2016, the debt was estimated to be $64.9 billion. Additional debt had been incurred in the past by state-owned organisations and this was said to be at least $9.5 billion. Since early 2015, domestic debt increased by 12% and external debt by 25%. In November 2016, the IMF reported that the initial disbursement was larger than US$150 million originally planned, a full US$162.6 million (SDR 119.894 million). The agency's evaluation for the first tranche was cautiously optimistic about the future. Under the programme, the Sri Lankan government implemented a new Inland Revenue Act and an automatic fuel pricing formula which was noted by the IMF in its fourth review. In 2018 China agreed to bail out Sri Lanka with a loan of $1.25 billion to deal with foreign debt repayment spikes in 2019 to 2021.

In September 2021, Sri Lanka declared a major economic crisis. The Chief of its Central Bank has stepped down amid the crisis. The Parliament has declared emergency regulations due to the crisis, seeking to ban "food hoarding".

Tourism, which provided the economy with an input of foreign currency, significantly declined as a result of the COVID-19 pandemic. Nevertheless, tourism has been able to gain momentum once again post-COVID, with over 1.3 million tourist arrivals halfway through 2026.

=== Transport ===
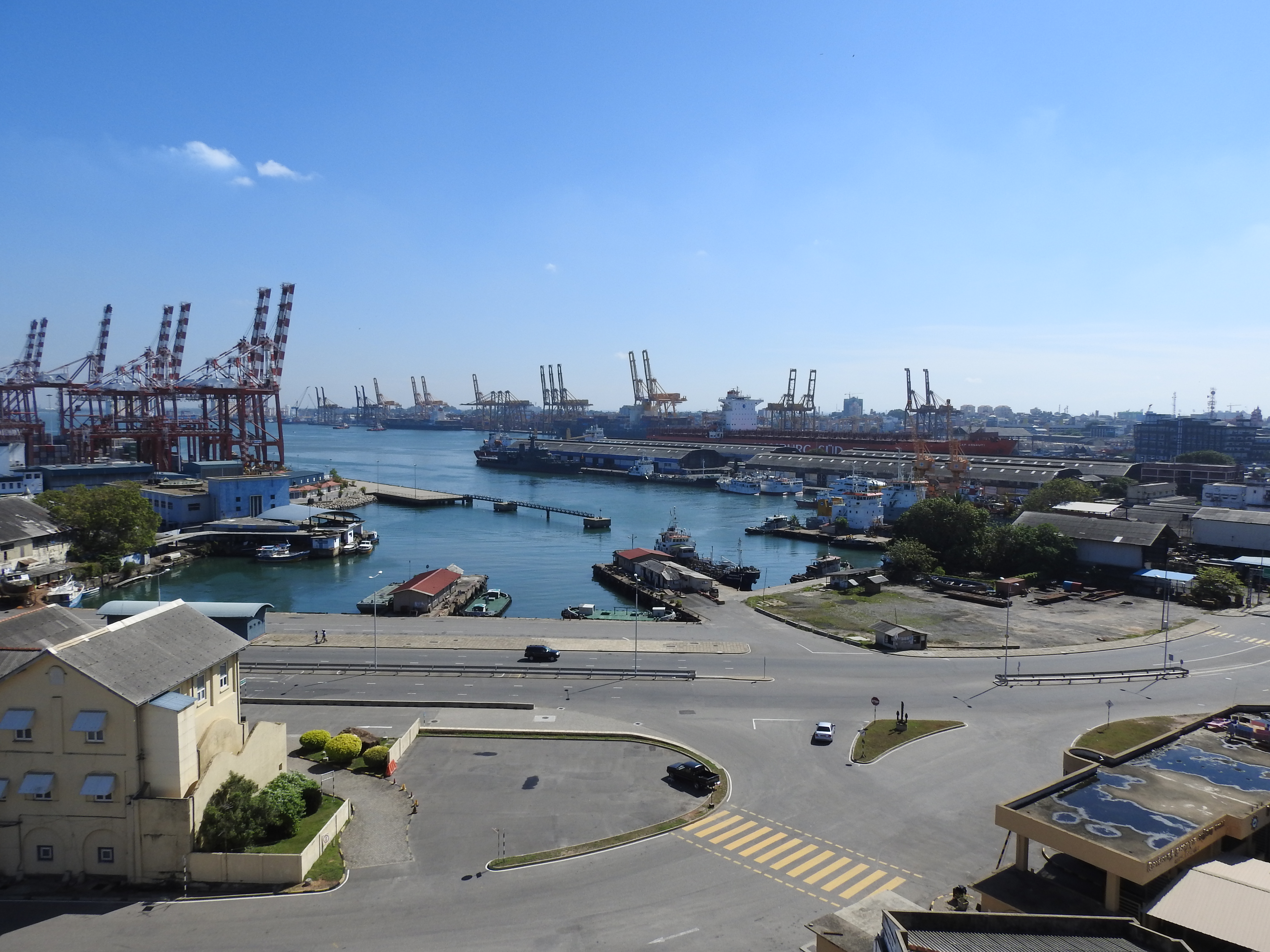
Colombo Port is the largest and busiest port in Sri Lanka

Sri Lanka has an extensive road network for inland transportation. With more than 100,000 km (62,000 mi) of paved roads, it has one of the highest road densities in the world (1.5 km or 0.93 mi of paved roads per every 1 km^{2} or 0.39 sq mi of land). The road network consists of 35 A-Grade highways and four controlled-access highways. A and B grade roads are national (arterial) highways administered by Road Development Authority. C and D grade roads are provincial roads coming under the purview of the Provincial Road Development Authority of the respective province. The other roads are local roads falling under local government authorities.

The railway network, operated by the state-run National Railway operator Sri Lanka Railways, spans 1,447 kilometres (900 mi). Sri Lanka also has three deep-water ports at Colombo, Galle, and Trincomalee, in addition to the newest port being built at Hambantota.

=== Transition to biological agriculture ===
In June 2021, Sri Lanka imposed a nationwide ban on inorganic fertilisers and pesticides. The programme was welcomed by its adviser Vandana Shiva, but ignored critical voices from scientific and farming community who warned about possible collapse of farming, including financial crisis due to devaluation of national currency pivoted around tea industry. The situation in the tea industry was described as critical, with farming under the organic programme being described as ten times more expensive and producing half of the yield by the farmers. In September 2021 the government declared an economic emergency, as the situation was further aggravated by falling national currency exchange rate, inflation rising as a result of high food prices, and pandemic restrictions in tourism which further decreased country's income.

In November 2021, Sri Lanka abandoned its plan to become the world's first organic farming nation following rising food prices and weeks of protests against the plan. As of December 2021, the damage to agricultural production was already done, with prices having risen substantially for vegetables in Sri Lanka, and time needed to recover from the crisis. The ban on fertiliser has been lifted for certain crops, but the price of urea has risen internationally due to the price for oil and gas. Jeevika Weerahewa, a senior lecturer at the University of Peradeniya, predicted that the ban would reduce the paddy harvest in 2022 by an unprecedented 50%.

=== Tourism ===
Sri Lanka's tourism industry is recovering, with tourism revenue reaching over $1.5 billion in the first half of 2024, a 78% increase year-on-year. Tourist arrivals also increased to 1.01 million, up 62% from the same period in 2023. This growth is attributed to the government's proactive measures and improvements from SriLankan Airlines. The government launched a global tourism marketing campaign and offered visa-free entry for visitors from several countries to encourage tourism. A free tourist visa programme was introduced for visitors from selected countries, allowing them to stay for up to 30 days.

== Demographics ==
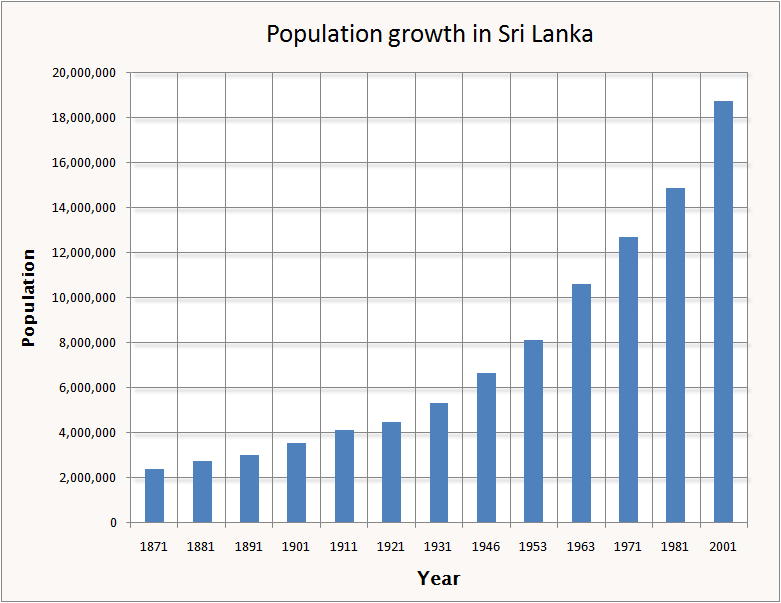
Sri Lanka's population, 1871–2001

Sri Lanka had a population of 21,781,800 at the 2024 census. The average annual population growth rate between the 2012 and 2024 censuses was 0.5%. Population density was highest in Colombo District, at 3,551 people per square kilometre, while the Western Province accounted for 28.1% of the country's population. Provisional figures for 2024 put the crude birth rate at 10.1 births per 1,000 people and the crude death rate at 7.8 deaths per 1,000 people.

Sinhalese constituted the largest ethnic group in the 2024 census, accounting for 74.12% of the population. Sri Lankan Tamils accounted for 12.31%, Sri Lankan Moors—recorded in the census as Sri Lanka Moor/Muslim—for 10.47%, and Indian Tamils/Malayaga Thamilar for 2.76%. Smaller communities include Burghers, Malays, Sri Lankan Chetties, Bharathas and Veddas. Burghers trace their ancestry to European settlers, while the Malay community has roots in Southeast Asia. The Veddas are an indigenous people of the island.

=== Largest cities ===
The following figures are from the 2012 census and refer to populations within municipal and urban council boundaries, rather than metropolitan areas.

Largest cities or towns in Sri Lanka (2012 Department of Census and Statistics enumeration)
Rank	Name	Province	Pop.	Rank	Name	Province	Pop.
1	Colombo	Western	561,314	11	Galle	Southern	86,333
2	Kaduwela	Western	252,041	12	Batticaloa	Eastern	86,227
3	Maharagama	Western	196,423	13	Jaffna	Northern	80,829
4	Kesbewa	Western	185,122	14	Matara	Southern	74,193
5	Dehiwala-Mount Lavinia	Western	184,468	15	Gampaha	Western	62,335
6	Moratuwa	Western	168,280	16	Katunayake	Western	60,915
7	Negombo	Western	142,449	17	Boralesgamuwa	Western	60,110
8	Sri Jayawardenepura Kotte	Western	107,925	18	Kolonnawa	Western	60,044
9	Kalmunai	Eastern	99,893	19	Anuradhapura	North Central	50,595
10	Kandy	Central	98,828	20	Trincomalee	Eastern	48,351

=== Languages ===
Sinhala and Tamil are Sri Lanka's official languages and national languages. The Constitution designates English as the link language. English is widely used in education, science and commerce. Some members of the Burgher community, particularly on the east coast, speak Portuguese Creole. Dutch, formerly spoken within the community, fell into disuse after the British takeover. Members of the Malay community speak Sri Lanka Malay, a distinctive variety shaped by contact with the island's other languages.

=== Religion ===
Religion in Sri Lanka (2024 census; percentages rounded)
1. Buddhism (69.8%)
2. Hinduism (12.6%)
3. Islam (10.7%)
4. Christianity (6.92%)
5. Other (0.02%)

Buddhism is Sri Lanka's largest religion and holds a constitutionally privileged position. Article 9 of the Constitution accords it the "foremost place" and requires the state to protect and foster the Buddha Sasana, while assuring all religions the rights provided by Articles 10 and 14(1)(e). These provisions protect freedom of thought, conscience and religion, and the freedom to manifest religion or belief.

At the 2024 census, 69.8% of the population identified as Buddhist. Most Sri Lankan Buddhists belong to the Sinhalese ethnic group and follow the Theravada tradition. According to Sri Lankan Buddhist chronicles, Buddhism was formally introduced to the island in the third century BCE by Mahinda, the son of Emperor Ashoka, during the reign of King Devanampiya Tissa. A cutting of the Bodhi Tree, under which the Buddha is believed to have attained enlightenment, was brought to Sri Lanka by Sanghamitta during the same century. The Pāli Canon (Tipiṭaka), previously transmitted orally, was committed to writing at Aluvihara around 30 BCE. Sri Lanka has a continuous Buddhist tradition spanning more than two millennia. During periods of decline, its monastic ordination lineages were revived through contact with Thailand and Burma.

Hindus form the country's largest religious minority, accounting for 12.6% of the population in 2024. Hindu traditions have been present on the island since at least the second century BCE. Religious and cultural contacts across the Palk Strait contributed to Hinduism's development in Sri Lanka. Shaivism, centred on devotion to Shiva, has been a major tradition among Tamil Hindus and has strongly influenced the island's Hindu temple architecture and philosophy. The Tamil poet-saint Thirugnanasambanthar referred to Sri Lankan Hindu temples in his hymns.

Islam is the country's third-largest religion, accounting for 10.7% of the population in 2024. It spread to the island through maritime trade, including contacts with Arab merchants. Most Sri Lankan Muslims are Sunni, and the Shafi'i school has traditionally predominated. The ancestry of the Sri Lankan Moors is associated with generations of Muslim trading communities and intermarriage with local populations.

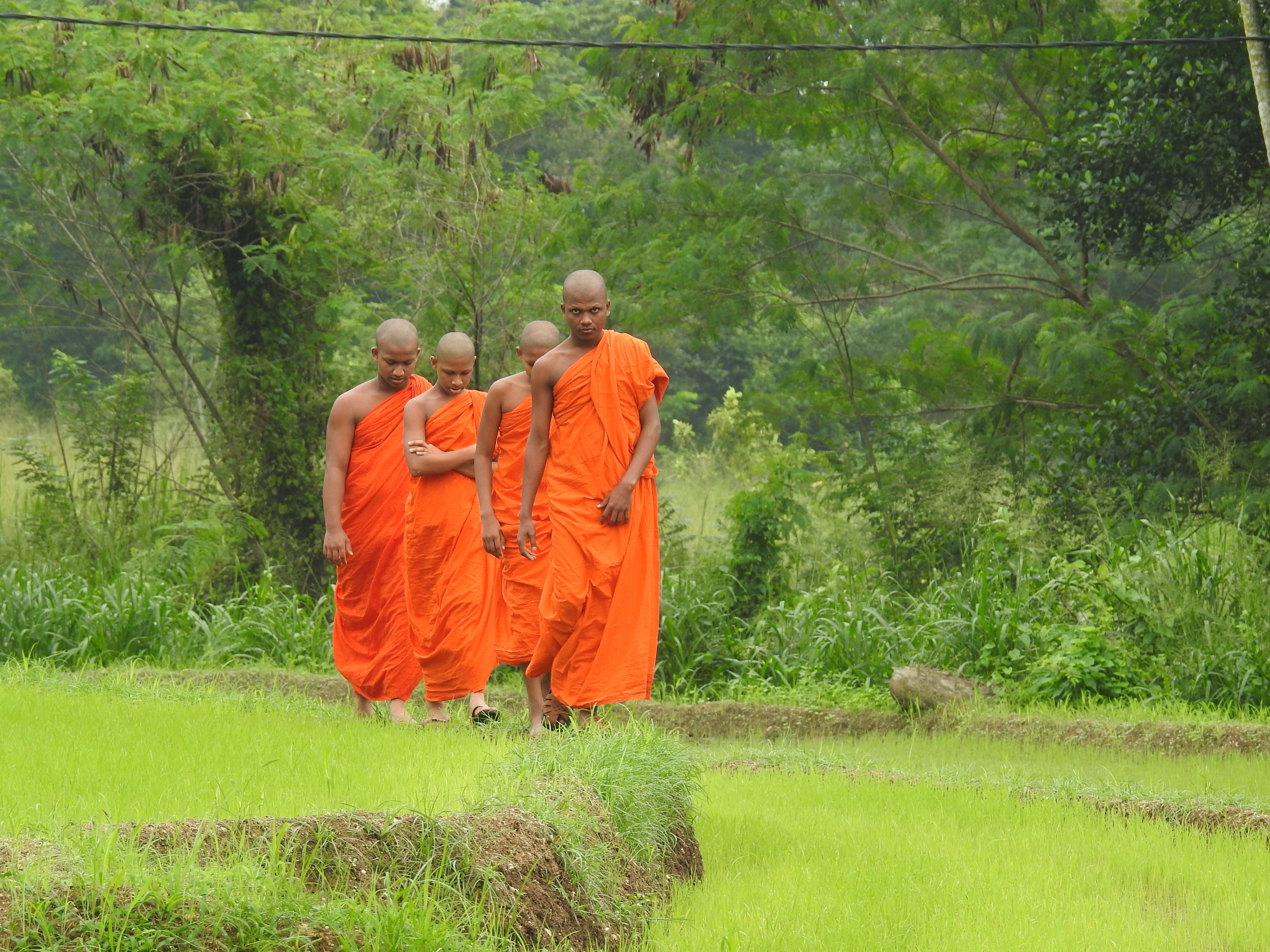
Buddhist monks in Sri Lanka

Christianity was present in Sri Lanka before European colonial rule. Traditions linking its origins to the first-century mission of Thomas the Apostle remain unconfirmed. In the sixth century, Cosmas Indicopleustes described a community of Persian Christians on the island. Christianity became more widespread under European colonial rule, beginning with the arrival of the Portuguese in the early 16th century. In 2024, Christians accounted for 6.9% of the population: 5.6% were Roman Catholic and 1.3% belonged to other Christian denominations. Catholic traditions in the country reflect the work of Portuguese missionaries, while Tamil Catholic communities also associate their religious heritage with St. Francis Xavier. Other Christian communities include the Anglican Church of Ceylon, Methodists, Baptists, the Dutch Reformed Church and Pentecostal denominations.

Sri Lanka also has a small Zoroastrian community descended from Parsi immigrants from India who settled in Ceylon during British rule. A 2000 report described the community's declining numbers.

Religion plays a prominent role in Sri Lankan life and culture. Buddhists observe monthly Poya days, which fall on the full moon, while Hindus, Muslims and Christians observe their respective religious festivals. In Gallup results published in 2025, 97% of Sri Lankan respondents said that religion was an important part of their daily lives.

=== Education ===
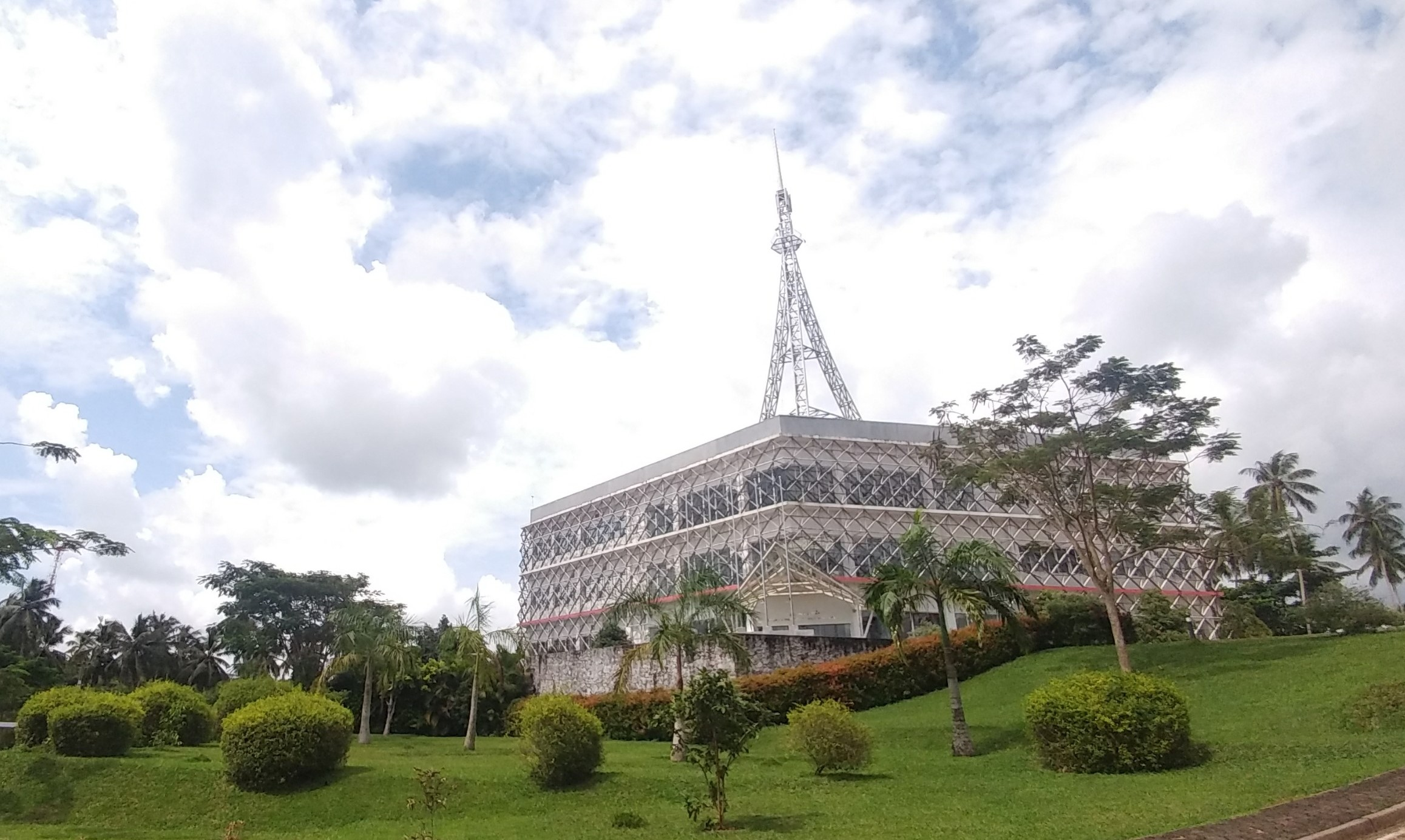
The Sri Lanka Institute of Nanotechnology, a research institute specialising in nanotechnology

Sri Lanka has a high level of literacy. The 2024 census recorded a literacy rate of 97.4% among people aged 10 and over, with rates of 97.9% for males and 97.0% for females. Youth literacy was 98.8% in 2015, while UNICEF's 2021 education sector budget brief reported a primary school enrolment rate of 99%. Computer literacy among people aged 5–69 was estimated at 35.9% in 2024; the corresponding digital literacy rate was 65.0%. Compulsory education extends to age 16.

The free education system, introduced in 1945, developed through the initiatives of C. W. W. Kannangara and A. Ratnayake. Publicly funded education extends from primary schooling to university study, although places at state universities are limited. Kannangara promoted the establishment of Madhya Vidyalayas (central schools) to expand educational opportunities for rural children. A special committee on education presented its report in 1943, proposing reforms to broaden access to education.

Following the establishment of provincial councils in 1987, responsibility for most government schools was transferred to provincial education authorities. National schools remained under the central Ministry of Education, while provincial schools were administered by the provincial authorities. In 2024, official statistics recorded 10,076 government schools, 95 government-assisted private schools and 821 pirivenas.

In 2024, 17 universities operated under the University Grants Commission. A 2009 country report identified mismatches between education and labour market needs, unequal access to quality education, and weak links between secondary and tertiary education as major challenges. Private degree-awarding institutions also provide higher education, including institutions recognised under Section 25A of the Universities Act. The gross tertiary enrolment ratio was 22% in 2020, according to the World Bank. Sri Lanka ranked 93rd in the Global Innovation Index in 2025.

=== Health ===
Life expectancy at birth in Sri Lanka over time

The World Health Organization estimated life expectancy at birth in Sri Lanka at 77.2 years in 2021. The Ministry of Health reported an infant mortality rate of 10.2 deaths per 1,000 live births in 2024, based on the Family Health Bureau's electronic reporting system. The maternal mortality ratio was 25 deaths per 100,000 live births in 2023. Sri Lanka's public healthcare system provides preventive and curative services free of charge, including medicines and investigations. WHO has identified this network of free public health services as an important contributor to improvements in the population's health.

Suicide remains a public health concern. Police statistics recorded a rate of approximately 15 deaths per 100,000 people in 2022, with a higher rate among men than women. According to WHO, suicide rates have declined substantially since the 1990s following restrictions on highly hazardous pesticides, but remain above the global average. WHO describes the contributing factors as complex, including economic insecurity, unemployment, alcohol misuse, domestic violence and untreated mental health conditions.

Sri Lanka was verified as having eliminated endemic measles in 2019 and rubella in 2020, ahead of the regional 2023 target. A measles outbreak began in 2023, prompting supplementary vaccination campaigns in 2024. In 2024, the regional verification commission reclassified Sri Lanka as a country with re-established measles transmission.

A preliminary study published in 2018, using 2015 surveillance data, found geographical clustering of reported sexually transmitted infections (STIs), including syphilis and genital herpes. The authors reported an association between districts with higher STI incidence and concentrations of populations at higher risk of infection, including around tourist destinations.

== Culture ==
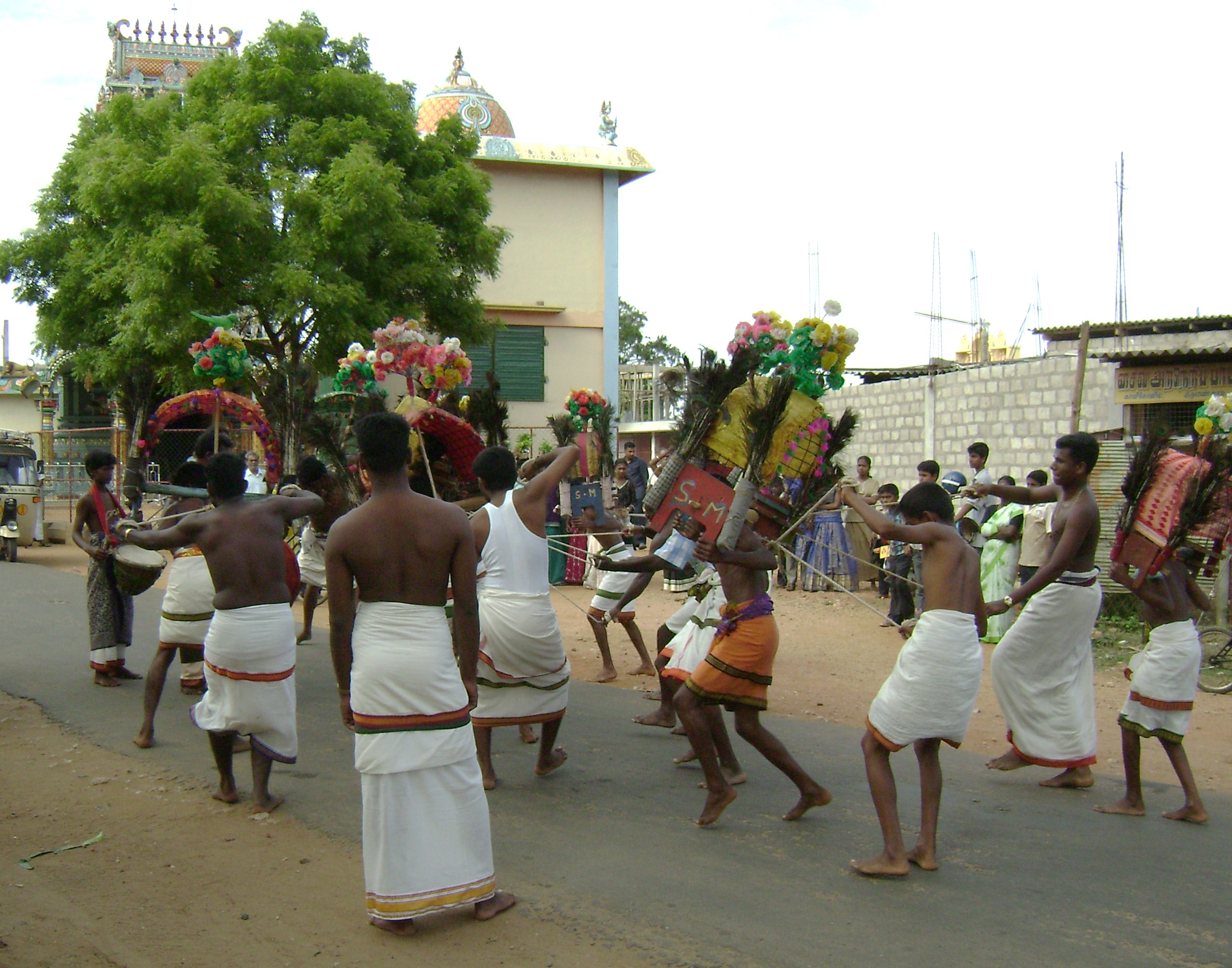
Hindu devotees engaging in Kavadi at a temple in Vavuniya

The culture of Sri Lanka is influenced primarily by Buddhism and Hinduism. Sri Lanka is the home to two main traditional cultures: the Sinhalese (centred in Kandy and Anuradhapura) and the Tamil (centred in Jaffna). Tamils co-existed with the Sinhalese people since then, and the early mixing rendered the two ethnic groups almost physically indistinguishable. Ancient Sri Lanka is marked for its genius in hydraulic engineering and architecture. The British colonial culture has also influenced the locals. The rich cultural traditions shared by all Sri Lankan cultures is the basis of the country's long life expectancy, advanced health standards, and high literacy rate.

=== Visual, literary and performing arts ===
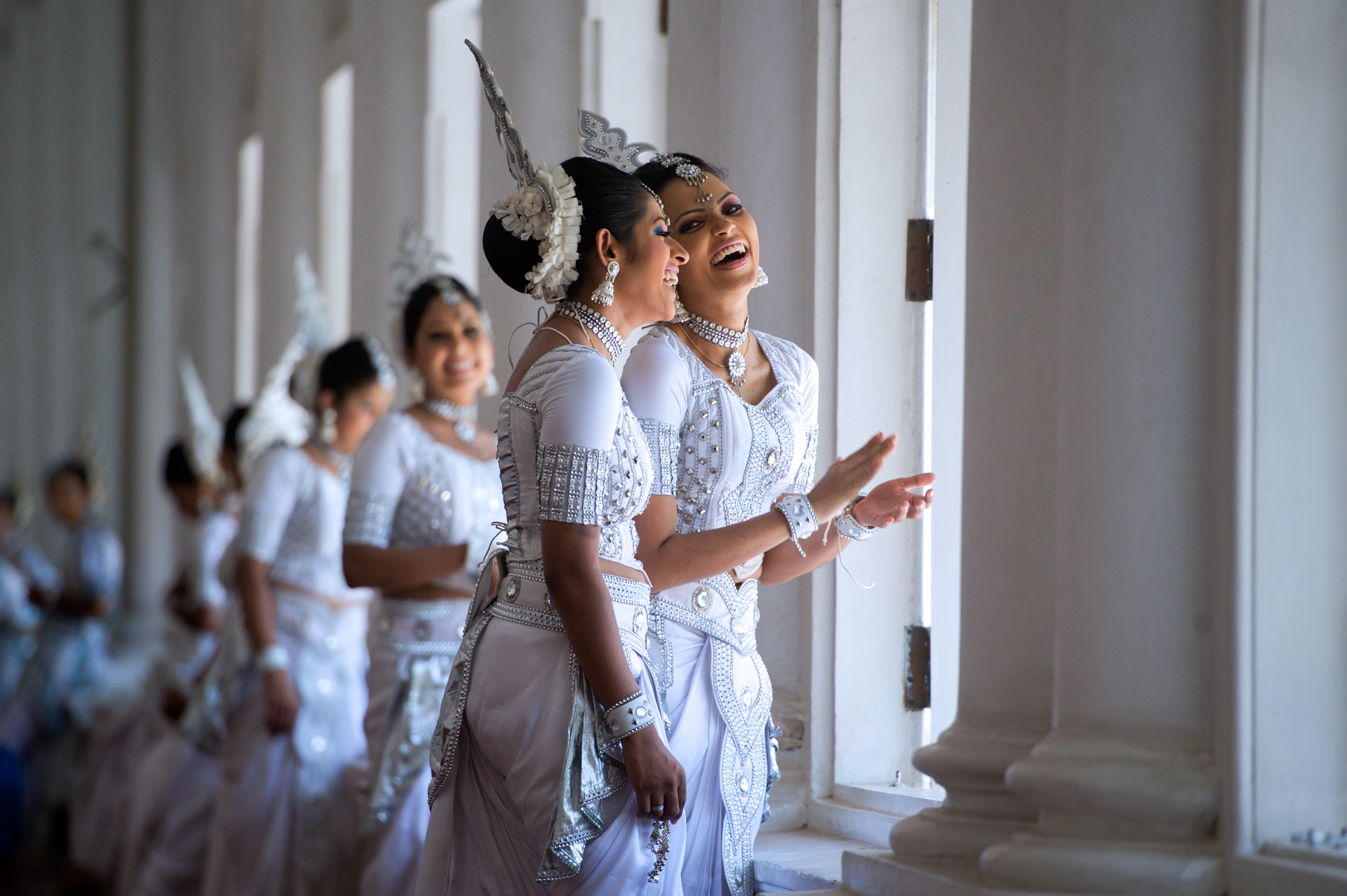
Female dancers in traditional Kandyan dress

The Nelum Pokuna Mahinda Rajapaksa Theatre was constructed as a major venue for the performing arts.

The movie Kadawunu Poronduwa (The Broken Promise), produced by S. M. Nayagam of Chitra Kala Movietone, heralded the coming of Sri Lankan cinema in 1947. Ranmuthu Duwa (Island of Treasures) marked the transition of cinema from black-and-white to colour. In recent years, movies have featured subjects such as family melodrama, social transformation and the years of conflict between the military and the LTTE. The Sri Lankan cinematic style is similar to Bollywood movies. In 1979, movie attendance rose to an all-time high but has been in a steady decline since then.

An influential filmmaker is Lester James Peiris, who has directed a number of movies which led to global acclaim, including Rekava (Line of Destiny, 1956), Gamperaliya (The Changing Village, 1964), Nidhanaya (The Treasure, 1970) and Golu Hadawatha (Cold Heart, 1968). Sri Lankan-Canadian poet Rienzi Crusz, is the subject of a documentary on his life in Sri Lanka. His work is published in Sinhala and English. Naturalised Canadian Michael Ondaatje is well known for his English-language novels and three films.

The earliest music in Sri Lanka came from theatrical performances such as Kolam, Sokari and Nadagam. Traditional music instruments such as Béra, Thammátama, Daŭla and Răbān were performed at these dramas. The first music album, Nurthi, recorded in 1903, was released through Radio Ceylon. Songwriters like Mahagama Sekara and Ananda Samarakoon and musicians such as W. D. Amaradeva, Victor Ratnayake, Nanda Malini and Clarence Wijewardene have contributed much towards the progression of Sri Lankan music. Baila music originated among Kaffirs or the Afro-Sinhalese community.

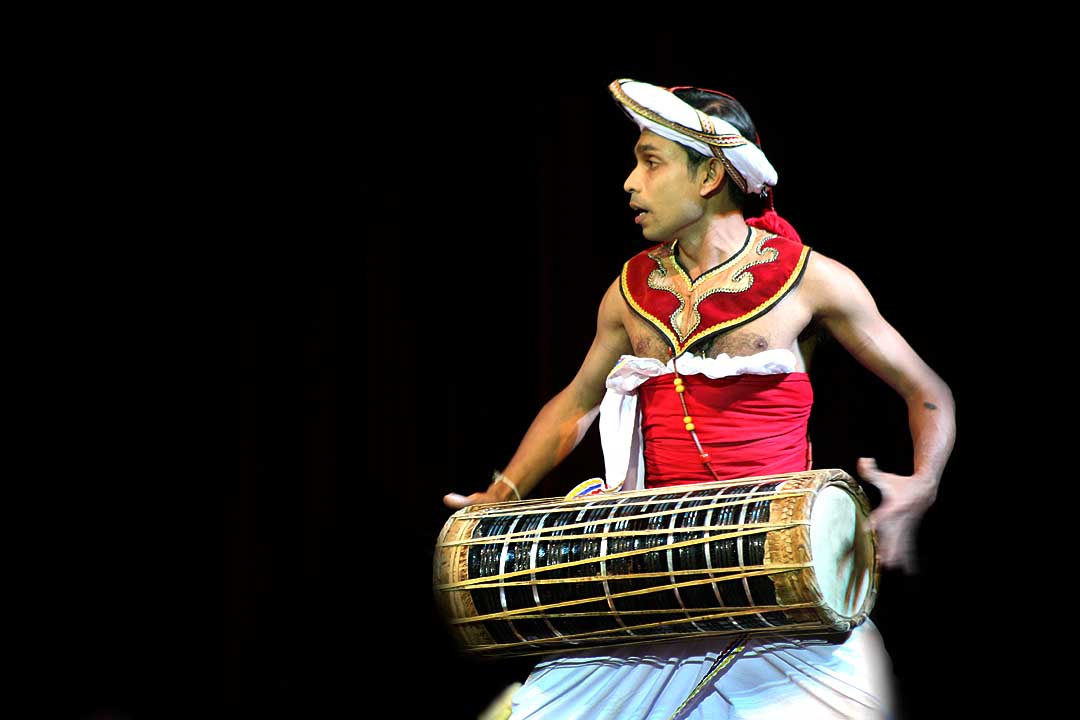
A Low Country drummer playing the traditional Yak Béra

There are three main styles of Sri Lankan classical dance. They are, the Kandyan dances, low country dances and Sabaragamuwa dances. Of these, the Kandyan style is most prominent. It is a sophisticated form of dance that consists of five sub-categories: Ves dance, Naiyandi dance, Udekki dance, Pantheru dance and 18 Vannam. An elaborate headdress is worn by the male dancers, and a drum called Geta Béraya is used to assist the dancers to keep on rhythm.

The history of Sri Lankan painting and sculpture can be traced as far back as to the 2nd or 3rd century BCE. The earliest mention about the art of painting on Mahāvaṃsa, is to the drawing of a palace on cloth using cinnabar in the 2nd century BCE. The chronicles have a description of various paintings in relic chambers of Buddhist stupas and in monastic residences.

Theatre came to the country when a Parsi theatre company from Mumbai introduced Nurti, a blend of European and Indian theatrical conventions to the Colombo audience in the 19th century. The golden age of Sri Lankan drama and theatre began with the staging of Maname, a play written by Ediriweera Sarachchandra in 1956. It was followed by a series of popular dramas like Sinhabāhu, Pabāvatī, Mahāsāra, Muudu Puththu and Subha saha Yasa.

Sri Lankan literature spans at least two millennia and is heir to the Aryan literary tradition as embodied in the hymns of the Rigveda. The Pāli Canon, the standard collection of scriptures in the Theravada Buddhist tradition, was written down in Sri Lanka during the Fourth Buddhist council, at the Alulena cave temple, Kegalle, as early as 29 BCE. Chronicles such as the Mahāvaṃsa, written in the 6th century, provide vivid descriptions of Sri Lankan dynasties. According to the German philosopher Wilhelm Geiger, the chronicles are based on Sinhala Atthakatha (commentary). The oldest surviving prose work is the Dhampiya-Atuva-Getapadaya, compiled in the 9th century CE. The greatest literary feats of mediaeval Sri Lanka include Sandesha Kāvya (poetic messages) such as Girā Sandeshaya (parrot message), Hansa Sandeshaya (swan message) and Salalihini Sandeshaya (myna message). Poetry including Kavsilumina, Kavya-Sekharaya (Diadem of Poetry) and proses such as Saddharma-Ratnāvaliya, Amāvatura (Flood of Nectar) and Pujāvaliya are also notable works of this period, which is considered to be the golden age of Sri Lankan literature. The first modern-day novel, Meena by Simon de Silva appeared in 1905 and was followed by several revolutionary literary works. Martin Wickramasinghe, the author of Madol Doova is considered the iconic figure of Sri Lankan literature.

=== Media ===
The Sri Lanka Broadcasting Corporation (formerly Radio Ceylon) is the oldest-running radio station in Asia, established in 1923 by Edward Harper, just three years after broadcasting began in Europe. The station broadcasts services in Sinhala, Tamil, English and Hindi. Since the 1980s, many private radio stations have also been introduced. Broadcast television was introduced in 1979 when the Independent Television Network was launched. Initially, all television stations were state-controlled, but private television networks began broadcasting in 1992.

As of 2020, 192 newspapers (122 Sinhala, 24 Tamil, 43 English, 3 multilingual) are published and 25 TV stations and 58 radio stations are in operation. In recent years, freedom of the press in Sri Lanka has been alleged by media freedom groups to be amongst the poorest in democratic countries. Alleged abuse of a newspaper editor by a senior government minister achieved international notoriety because of the unsolved murder of the editor's predecessor, Lasantha Wickrematunge, who had been a critic of the government and had presaged his own death in a posthumously published article.

=== Cuisine and festivals ===
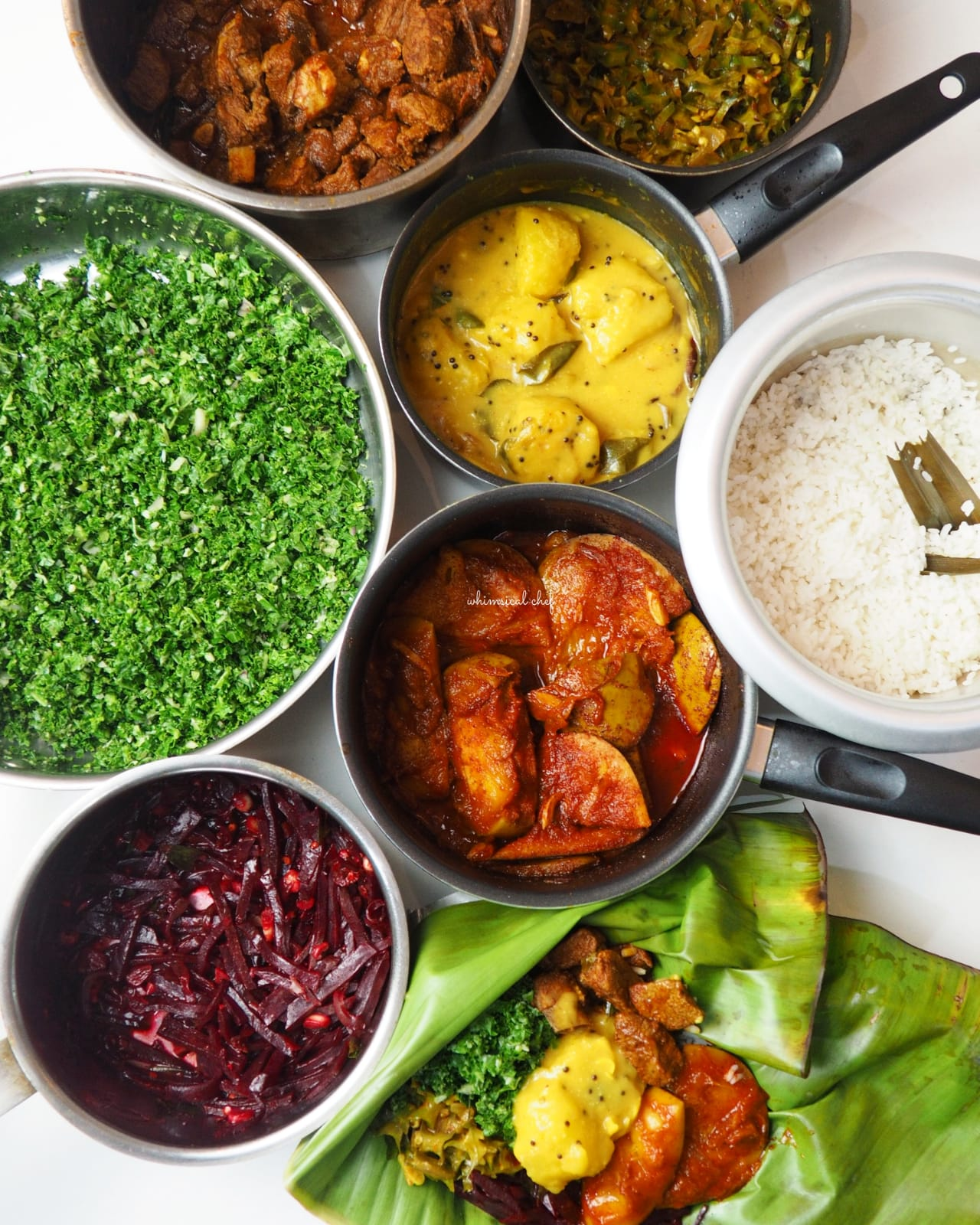
Sri Lankan rice and curry

Dishes include rice and curry, pittu, kiribath, wholemeal roti, string hoppers, watalappam (a rich pudding of Malay origin made with coconut milk, jaggery, cashews, eggs, and spices including cinnamon and nutmeg), kottu, and appam. Jackfruit may sometimes replace rice. Traditionally food is served on a plantain leaf or lotus leaf. Middle Eastern influences and practices are found in traditional Moor dishes, while Dutch and Portuguese influences are found with the island's Burgher community preserving their culture through traditional dishes such as lamprais (rice cooked in stock and baked in a banana leaf), breudher (Dutch holiday biscuit), and Bolo fiado (Portuguese-style layer cake).

In April, Sri Lankans celebrate the Buddhist and Hindu new year festivals. Esala Perahera is a symbolic Buddhist festival consisting of dances and decorated elephants held in Kandy in July and August. Fire dances, whip dances, Kandyan dances and various other cultural dances are integral parts of the festival. Christians celebrate Christmas on 25 December to celebrate the birth of Jesus Christ and Easter to celebrate the resurrection of Jesus. Tamils celebrate Thai Pongal and Maha Shivaratri, and Muslims celebrate Hajj and Ramadan.

=== Sport ===
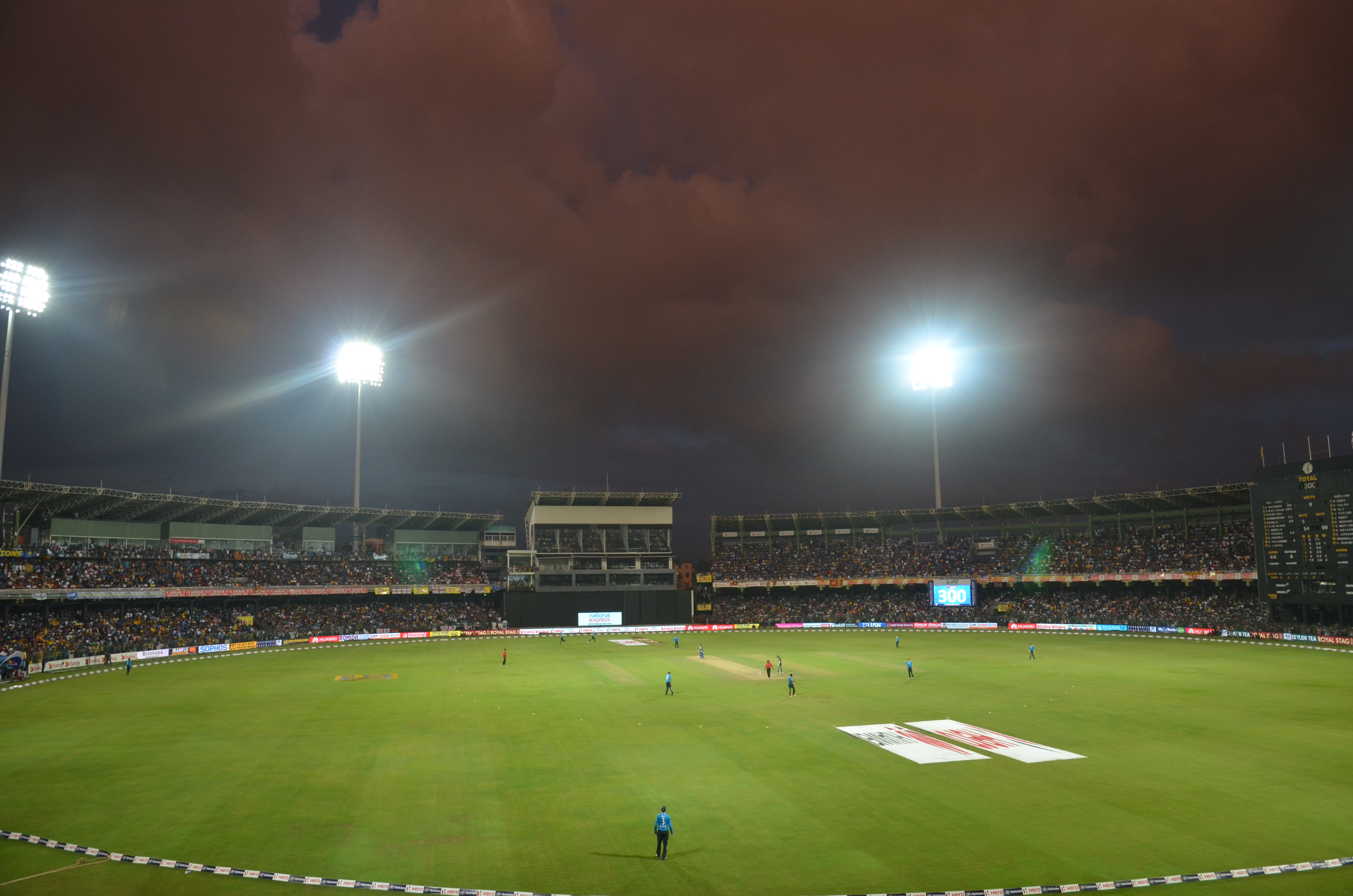
R. Premadasa Stadium in Colombo

While the national sport is volleyball, by far the most popular sport in the country is cricket. Rugby union also enjoys extensive popularity, as do association football, netball and tennis. Aquatic sports such as boating, surfing, swimming, kitesurfing and scuba diving attract many Sri Lankans and foreign tourists. There are two styles of martial arts native to Sri Lanka: Cheena di and Angampora.

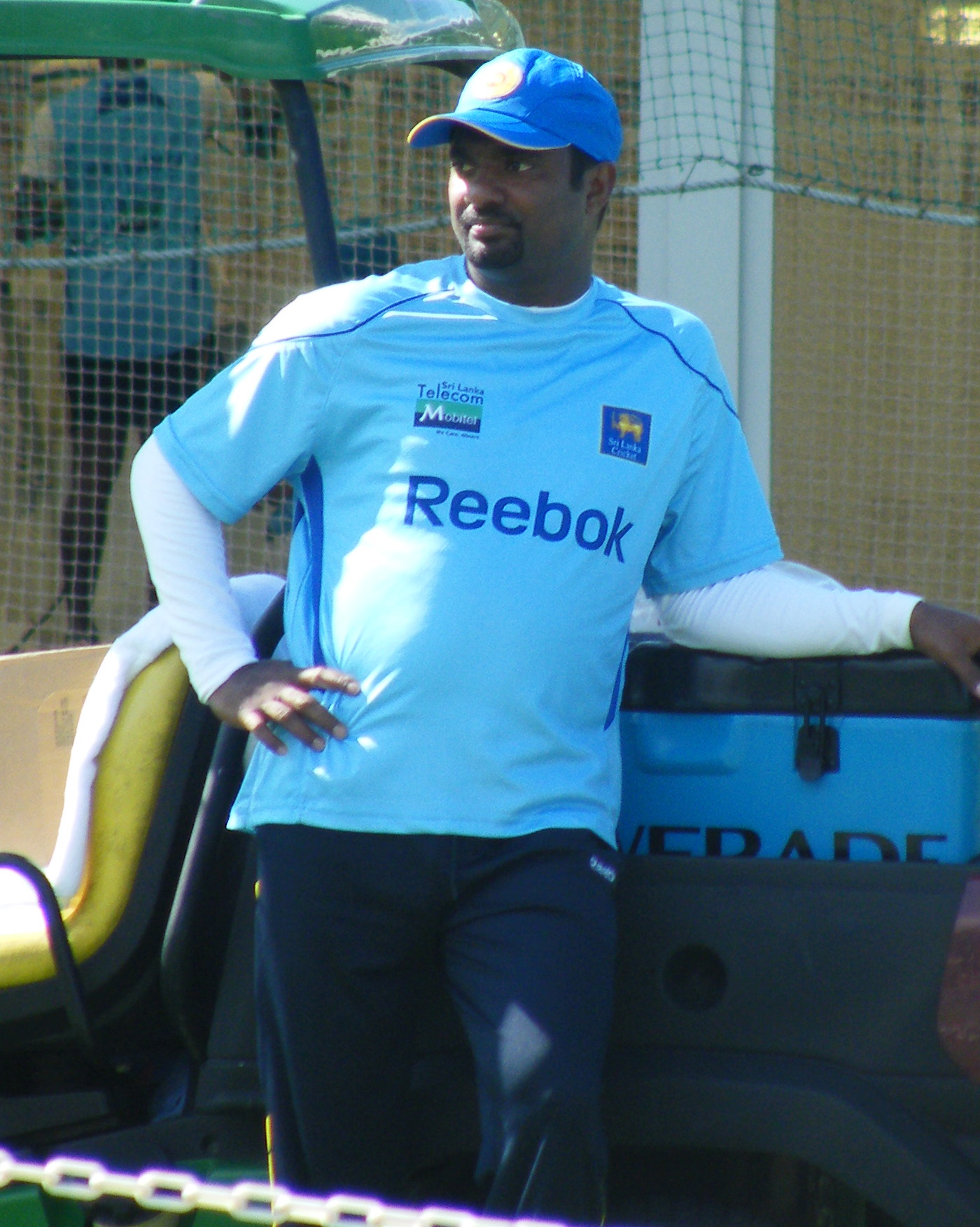
Muttiah Muralitharan holds the record for the highest number of wickets in Test cricket.

The Sri Lanka national cricket team achieved considerable success beginning in the 1990s, rising from underdog status to winning the 1996 Cricket World Cup, defeating Australia in the final on 17 March 1996. They also won the 2014 ICC World Twenty20 played in Bangladesh, beating India in the final. In addition, Sri Lanka became the runners-up of the Cricket World Cup in 2007 and 2011, and of the ICC World Twenty20 in 2009 and 2012. Former Sri Lankan off-spinner Muttiah Muralitharan has been rated as the greatest test match bowler ever by Wisden Cricketers' Almanack, and four Sri Lankan cricketers ranked 2nd (Sangakkara), 4th (Jayasuriya), 5th (Jayawardene) and 11th (Dilshan) highest ODI run scorers of all time, which is the second best by a team. As of June 2022, Muttiah Muralitharan has the highest aggregate wickets in Test Cricket with a record 800 wickets, a feat he achieved in a Test Match against India in July 2010 that Sri Lanka had won by 10 Wickets. Sri Lanka has won the Asia Cup in 1986, 1997, 2004, 2008, 2014. and 2022. Sri Lanka once held the highest team score in all three formats of cricket. The country co-hosted the Cricket World Cup in 1996 and 2011 and hosted the 2012 ICC World Twenty20.

Sri Lankans have won two medals at Olympic Games: one silver, by Duncan White at the 1948 London Olympics for men's 400 metres hurdles; and one silver by Susanthika Jayasinghe at the 2000 Sydney Olympics for women's 200 metres. In 1973, Muhammad Lafir won the World Billiards Championship, the highest feat by a Sri Lankan in a Cue sport. Sri Lanka has also won the Carrom World Championship titles twice in 2012, 2016 and 2018, the men's team becoming champions and the women's team winning second place. The Sri Lankan National Badminton Championships was annually held between 1953 and 2011.

Sri Lanka is ranked 6th in the ICC Men's Test Team Rankings 2025 with rating 86.

Sri Lanka national football team also won the prestigious 1995 South Asian Gold Cup.

== See also ==
- Outline of Sri Lanka
- List of cities in Sri Lanka
