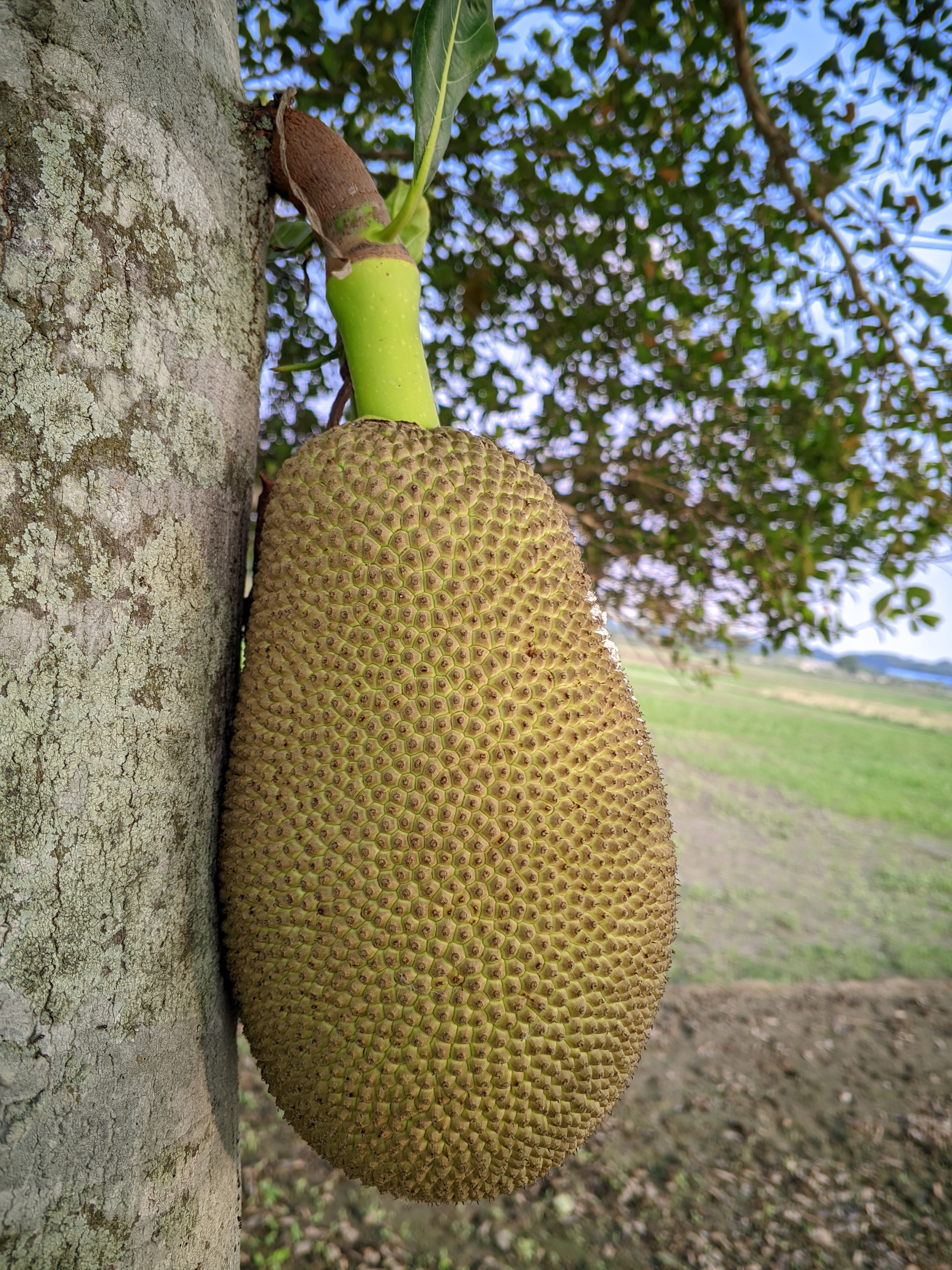

Scientific classification
- Kingdom: Plantae
- Clade: Tracheophytes
- Clade: Angiosperms
- Clade: Eudicots
- Clade: Rosids
- Order: Rosales
- Family: Moraceae
- Genus: Artocarpus
- Species: A. heterophyllus

Binomial name
- Artocarpus heterophyllus Lamarck (1789)

Synonyms
- Artocarpus philippensis Lamarck (1789); Polyphema jaca Loureiro (1790); Artocarpus nanca Noronha (1790) (nom inval.); Artocarpus brasiliensis Gómez (1803); Artocarpus integrifolius var. heterophyllus Lamarck (1807); Artocarpus integrifolius var. glaber Stokes (1812); Artocarpus maximus Blanco (1837); Saccus heterophyllus Kuntze (1891); Artocarpus grandis Linden (1889)

= Jackfruit =

Species of plant

The jackfruit or jakfruit (Artocarpus heterophyllus) is a fruit tree in the mulberry family of Moraceae. Native to India, the species was first described under the name Artocarpus heterophyllus in Encyclopédie Méthodique, Botanique in 1789 by Jean-Baptiste Lamarck, based on a specimen collected by botanist Philibert Commerson.

The jackfruit tree is a large evergreen tree that can grow up to 30 m (98 ft) tall. It has a dense foliage with leathery leaves which are smooth on one side and rough on the other. Fine hairs cover various parts of the tree, and the bark and leaves produce a sticky, milky sap. The tree is monoecious and produces an inflorescence consisting of cluster of small, pale green flowers from the trunk and large branches. The tree produces the largest of all tree-borne fruits, measuring up to 90 cm (35 in) in length and 50 cm (20 in) in width and weighing up to 50 kg (110 lb). The yellowish-green fruit has a thick shell with numerous tubercles and emits a characteristic odour on ripening. The interior of the fruit consists of several yellow coloured fleshy bulbs each of which encloses a single seed.

The jackfruit tree might have originated in the Western Ghats range in India. In addition to the various countries in South Asia and Southeast Asia, where it is extensively grown, it has also been introduced across parts of Africa, Americas, and Oceania. Though it grows on a variety of habitats at low altitude, it prefers moist, well-drained soils and sufficient sunlight. The tree matures and may start bearing fruits anywhere between 4 and 14 years and can have a productive lifespan of more than a hundred years.

The fruit bulbs and seeds are edible, and can be eaten raw. It is also sold canned or frozen, or processed into other foods. It is commonly used in South and Southeast Asian cuisines.

== Etymology and taxonomy ==
The name jackfruit comes from Portuguese jaca first mentioned by physician and naturalist Garcia de Orta in his 1563 book Colóquios dos simples e drogas da India. Jaca is derived from the Malayalam word chakka, which is used to refer to the fruit in the Malabar region of India as mentioned by Hendrik van Rheede (1636–1691) in the third volume of Hortus Malabaricus. It is derived from the Proto-Dravidian root kā(y) meaning fruit or vegetable.

In 1984, Ralph Randles Stewart suggested that it might have been named after botanist William Jack (1795–1822), a Scottish botanist who worked for the East India Company in Bengal, Sumatra, and Malaya.

In India, it is known as palaa in Tamil, kathal in Hindi and Bengali, and phanas in Marathi. It is known as nangka in Tagalog, and nangkà in Cebuano and in Malay, all from the Austronesian language family. It is known as khanun in Thai, khnor in Khmer, may mi in Lao, and mit in Vietnamese.

The species was first described under the name Artocarpus heterophyllus in Encyclopédie Méthodique, Botaniquein 1789 by Jean-Baptiste Lamarck, based on a specimen collected by botanist Philibert Commerson. The genus name Artocarpus is derived from Greek words–'artos' meaning bread and 'karpos' meaning fruit. The species name heterophyllus means "variously leaved" in Latin. It is part of Moraceae, commonly known as mulberry family. It was placed in Urticaceae in the Bentham & Hooker system of classification by George Bentham and Joseph Dalton Hooker, but was later reclassified under Moraceae.

== Description ==
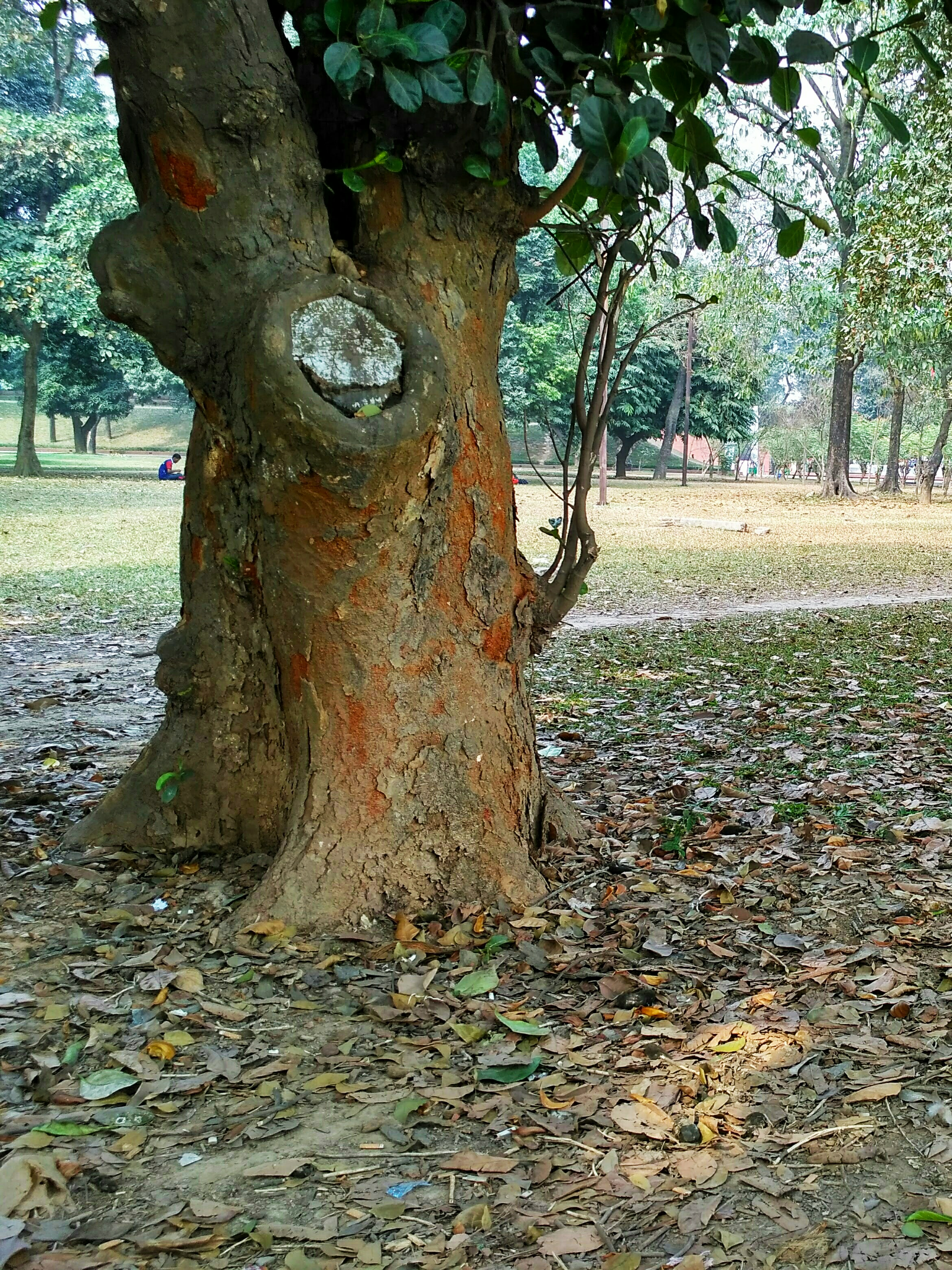
Trunk showing greyish-brown colouration

The jackfruit tree is an evergreen tree that grows up to 30 m (98 ft). The bark is hard and rough, and covered with scales. It varies from greyish brown to dark grey in colour. Twigs arise from the trunk, and are 2 to 6 mm (0.079 to 0.236 in) thick, with minute flattened hairs covering their surface. The foliage is denser when the tree is young, and it spreads out when the tree grows further. The leaves are alternately and spirally arranged.

The leaves contain three lobes in young trees, and become elliptical or obovate in shape later. The lamina measures 4 to 15 cm (1.6 to 5.9 in) and 2 to 8 cm (0.79 to 3.15 in) across the longer and shorter axes. The thin and leathery leaves are smooth on one side and rough on the other side. The leave surfaces has smooth hairs with the distribution sparser on the rough side. There are six to ten pairs of veins with whitish flattened hairs on the mid rib. There are ring-like stipules at the base of the leave stem. The petiole is 0.8 to 3 cm (0.31 to 1.18 in) long and 1 to 2 mm (0.039 to 0.079 in) thick, and is also covered with minute hairs. The bark and leaves ooze a milky and sticky sap.

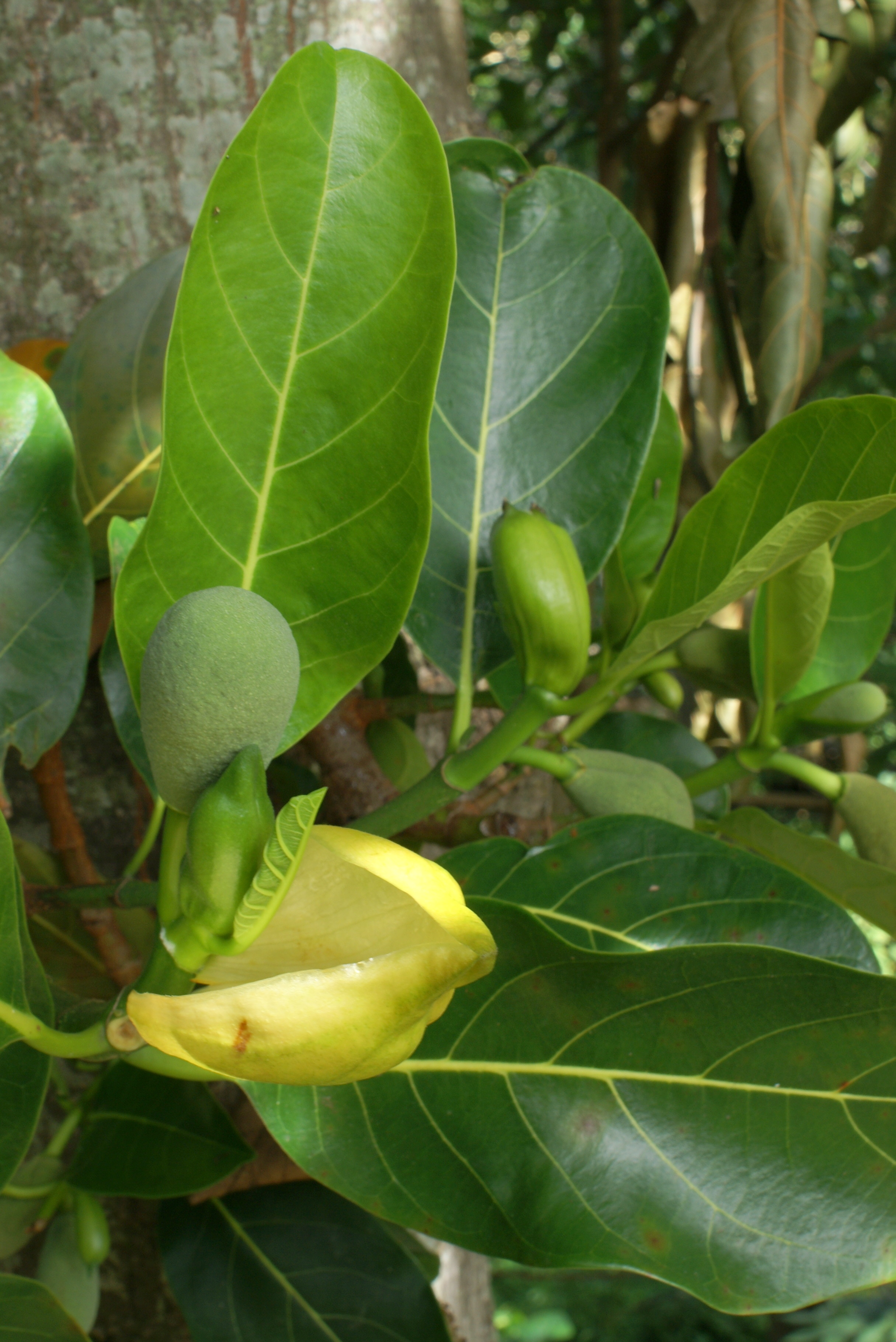
Flower buds

The tree is monoecious and produces an inflorescence from the trunk and large branches (cauliflory). The male flowers are borne in clusters along the leaf axils, or smaller branches while the larger female flowers often occur on larger branches or on the trunk. The male flower bearing peduncles measure 1 to 5.5 cm (0.39 to 2.17 in) long with the female flower bearing stalks measuring longer ranging from 3 to 10 cm (1.2 to 3.9 in). The male flowers are 2.5 to 7 cm (0.98 to 2.76 in) long and 0.8 to 2.8 cm (0.31 to 1.10 in) wide, and the female flowers are larger.

The flowers look pale green when young and become darker later. The male flowers can be distinguished by the presence of yellow coloured pollen. The perianth is two lobed and rounded, and is covered with fine hairs. The stamen is 1.5 to 2 mm (0.059 to 0.079 in) long. Bracts may be present in between the flowers. The infructescence is 30 to 100 cm (12 to 39 in) long and 25–50 cm (9.8–19.7 in) wide, bearing small ellipsoid fruit heads.

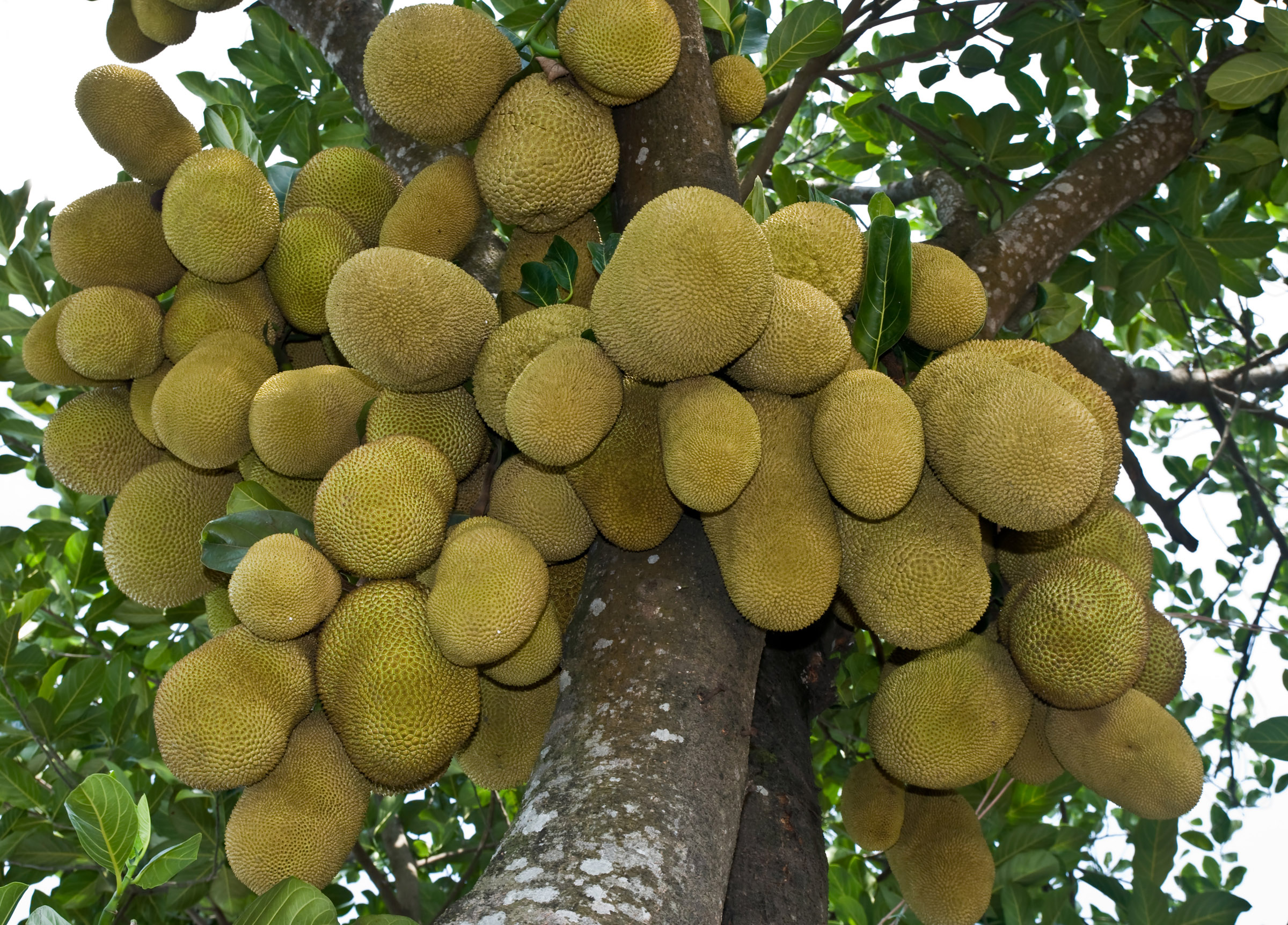
Cluster of fruits

The jackfruit is amongst the largest of all tree-borne fruits. It measures 20 to 90 cm (7.9 to 35.4 in) in length and 15 to 50 cm (5.9 to 19.7 in) in width. The matured fruits weigh anywhere between 4.5 and 50 kg (9.9 and 110.2 lb). The fruit is green or yellowish-green on the outer side. The colour changes to brownish yellow when the fruit matures. The hard and rubbery outer shell has numerous thick tubercles, which somewhat flatten with maturation. The fully ripe fruit emits a characteristic odour, due to the presence of several volatile organic compounds such as ethyl isovalerate, propyl isovalerate, butyl isovalerate, isobutyl isovalerate, 3-methylbutyl acetate, 1-butanol, and 2-methylbutan-1-ol.

The interior of the fruit is yellow in colour and consists of several bulbs situated amongst a cluster of narrow and sticky strips. A fruit may contain 100 to 500 of these bulbs, each of which enclose a single seed. The bulbs are soft and fleshy in some varieties while it is harder in others. The brown coloured seed is 0.75 to 1.5 in (19 to 38 mm) long and 0.5 to 0.75 in (13 to 19 mm) thick. The smooth and elliptical shaped seed is covered by a thin white coloured seed coat.

== Distribution and habitat ==
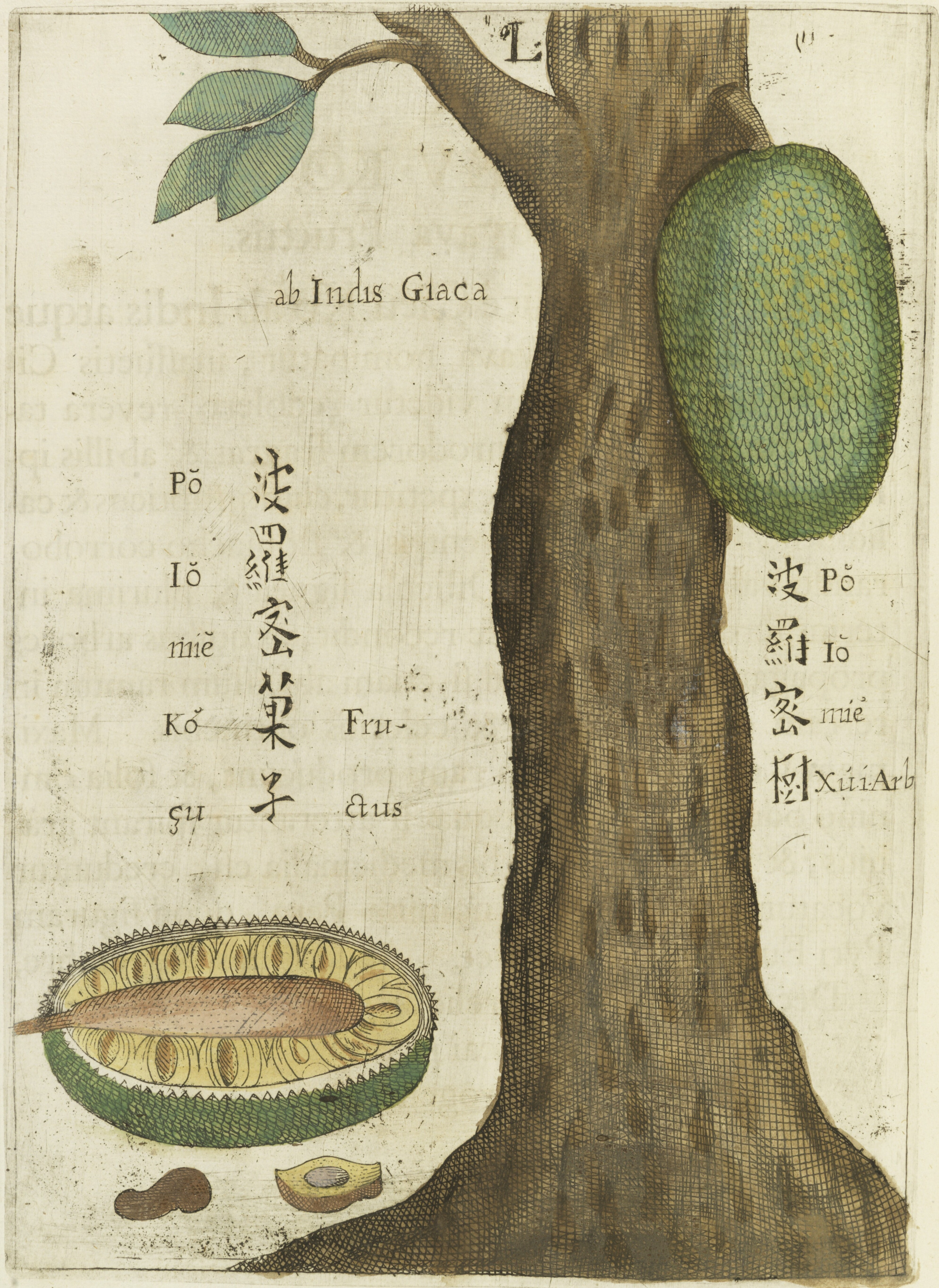
Illustration of jackfruit by Michael Boym c. 1656

The jackfruit tree is native to India and might belong to the Western Ghats range in India. It spread to Southeast Asia, and to the islands of Indonesia and the Philippines. It was later introduced to East Africa and to the Americas. In addition to the various countries in South Asia and Southeast Asia, where it is extensively grown, it is also found in China, Brazil, Suriname, and Venezuela in South America, the Caribbean, Central, East and West Africa and the islands of Mauritius, Seychelles, and Reunion, and parts of Oceania and North America. It can become an invasive species as in Brazil's Tijuca Forest.

The jackfruit tree grows in a variety of habitats ranging from tropical rainforest to lowland and dry forests. It generally grows at lower altitudes (less than 1,600 m (5,200 ft)), and trees growing in higher altitudes tend to produce low quality fruits. It requires optimal temperature between 19 and 29 °C (66 and 84 °F) with sunlight. It is not drought resistant beyond a few months and requires adequate moisture. Though it grows in various soil types, it grows well in slightly acidic, moist and well drained soils. In India, it has been observed to grow thicker and stouter on conducive soils and thinner in sandy soils.

== Reproduction and lifespan ==
The plant is generally grown from the seed, though it can be grown from stem cuttings and grafts. The first shoots arise anywhere between 10 and 40 days depending on the conditions. The plant can be transplanted in the initial few weeks. The tree matures and may start bearing fruits anywhere between 4 and 14 years though earlier occurrences have been noted. It reaches its maximum height around 20 years. In suitable conditions, the tree has a productive lifespan of more than a hundred years, though the yield might reduce or stop with ageing. Insects help in pollination with a three-way mutualism involving the tree, a fungus, and a species of gall midge, Clinidiplosis ultracrepidata, has been noted. The fungus forms a film which is a food source for the insects.

== Cultivation and production ==
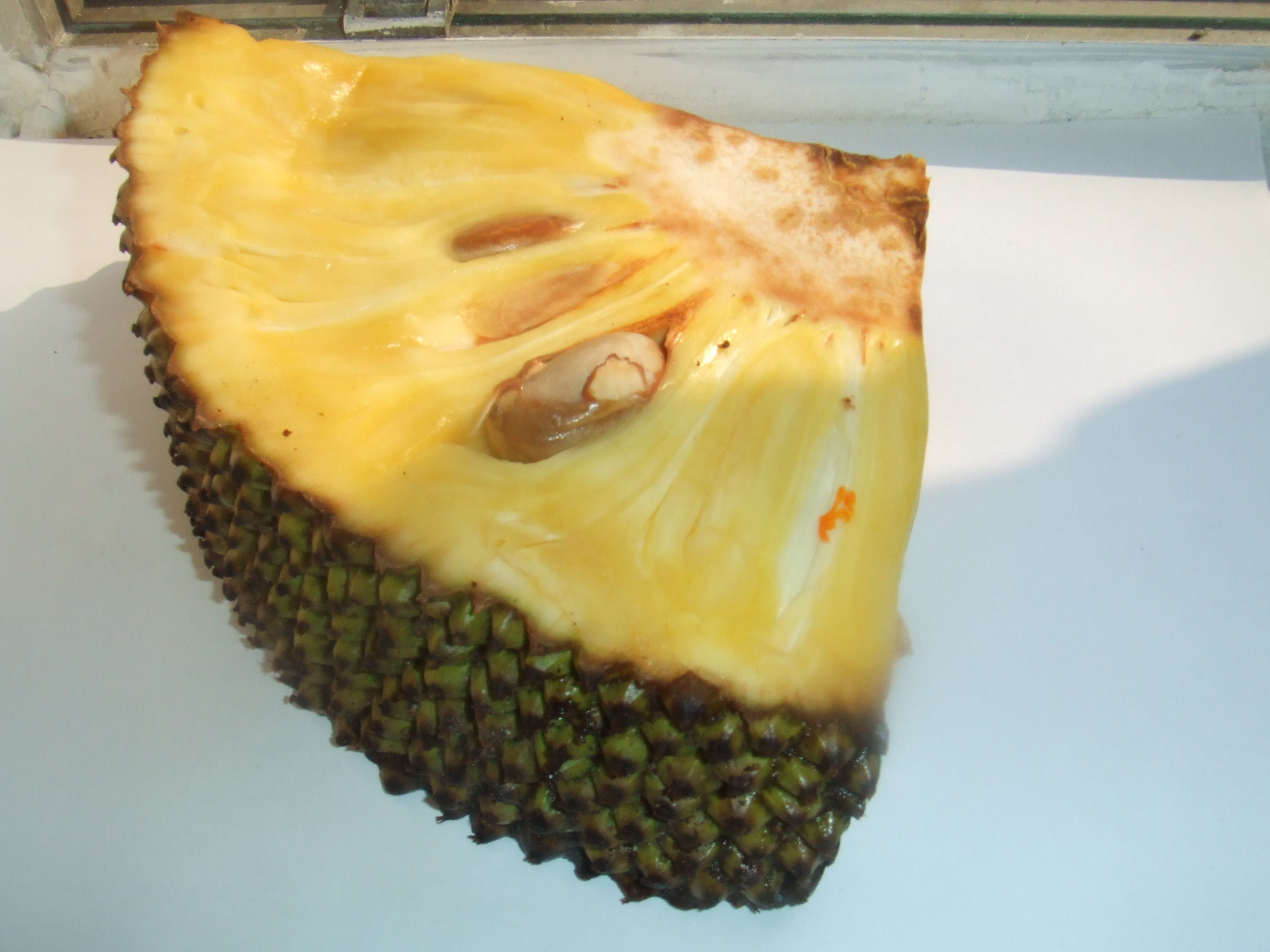
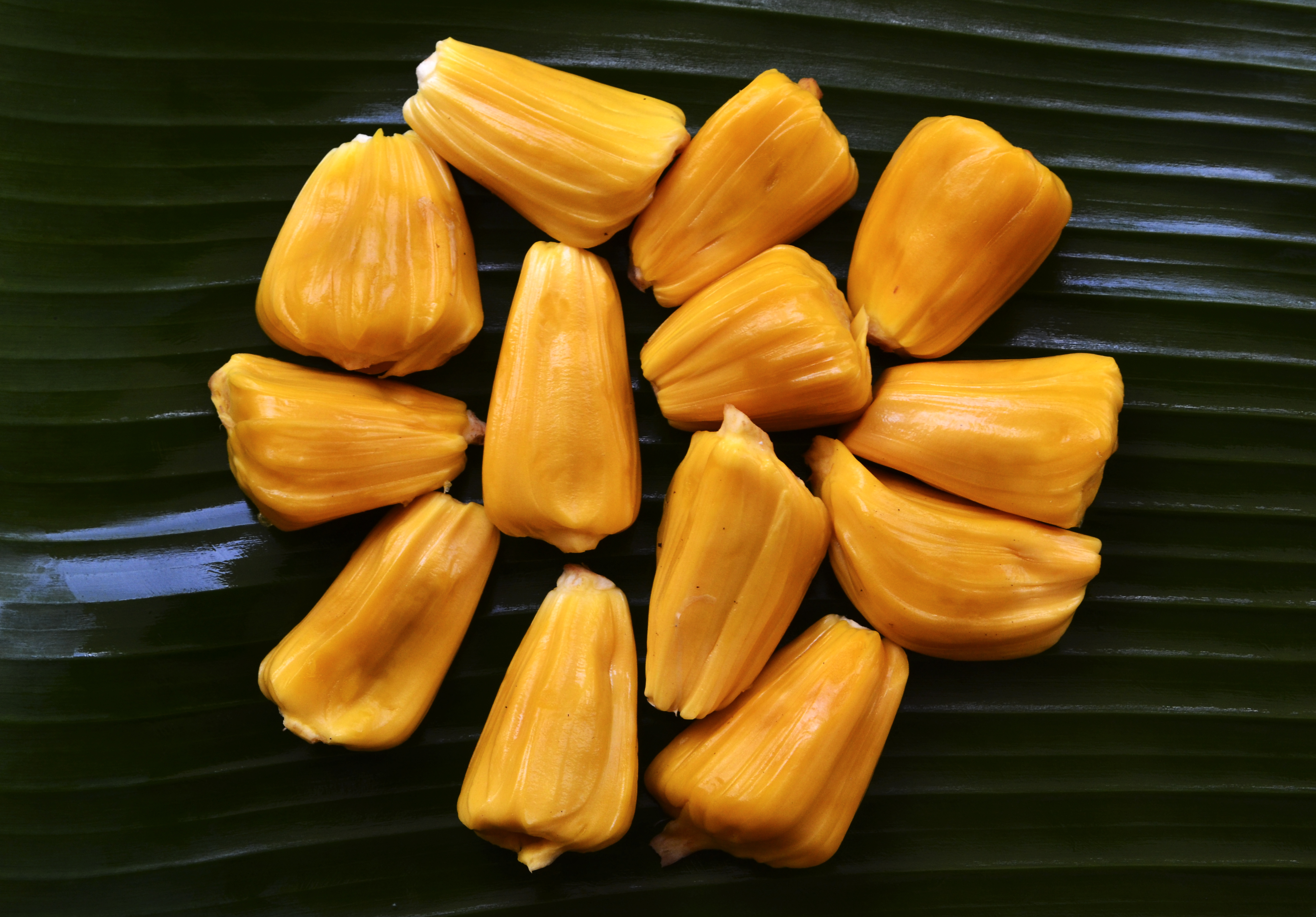
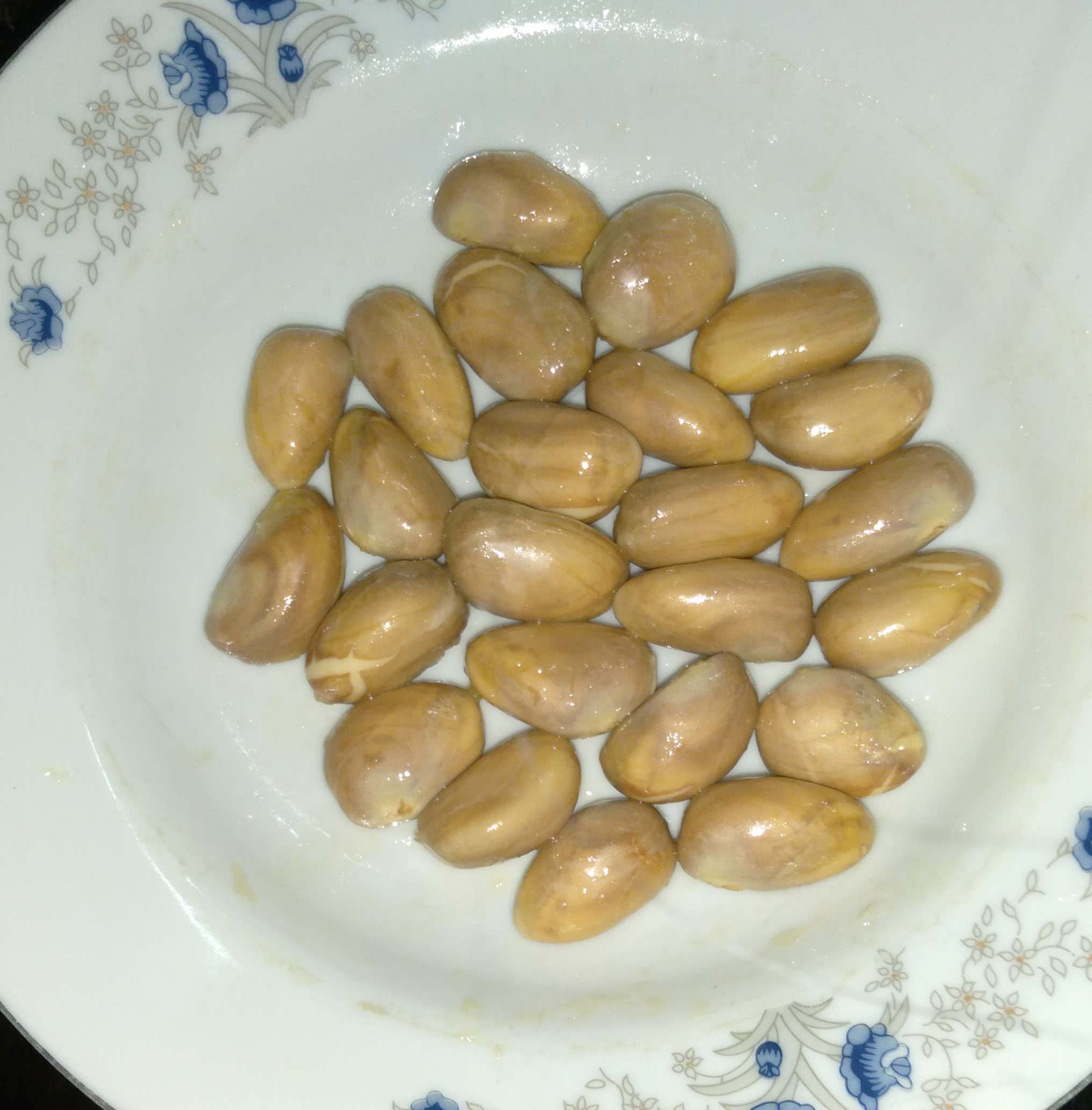
Jackfruit slice (left), arils (center) and seeds

The jackfruit is extensively cultivated commercially in South and Southeast Asia, and other parts of the world such as Brazil. Archaeological evidence has revealed that the jackfruit was cultivated in India about 3,000 to 6,000 years ago. Though there are several cultivars and varieties, two broad types of fruits are generally described, one with soft, juicy, and sweet kernels, and the other with hard and crisp ones. The fruits mature three to eight months after flowering. It is harvested by hand, and ripe fruits turn colour from pale green to greenish brown, give a characteristic odour, and makes a hollow noise when tapped.

Once harvested, the fruit has to be consumed quickly, and once cut open, they deteriorate within a few days. At cooler temperatures, the fruits can survive three to six weeks. As per an estimate, about 75% of the fruits go waste due to the limited life span. Due to the presence of latex, the hands, knives, and other surfaces are generally coated with a viscous liquid such as oil to prevent sticking. Fresh jackfruit can be found commonly at food markets throughout South and Southeast Asia. The fruit is sold as whole, in slices, or as individual bulbs. The seeds are also dried and sold separately for consumption. Apart from fresh fruit, the fruit is also sold as frozen, dried, canned, or processed into other foods. In 2024, India was the largest producer with 1.436 million tonnes of jackfruit, followed by Bangladesh (0.926 mt), Thailand (0.392 mt), and Indonesia (0.340 mt).

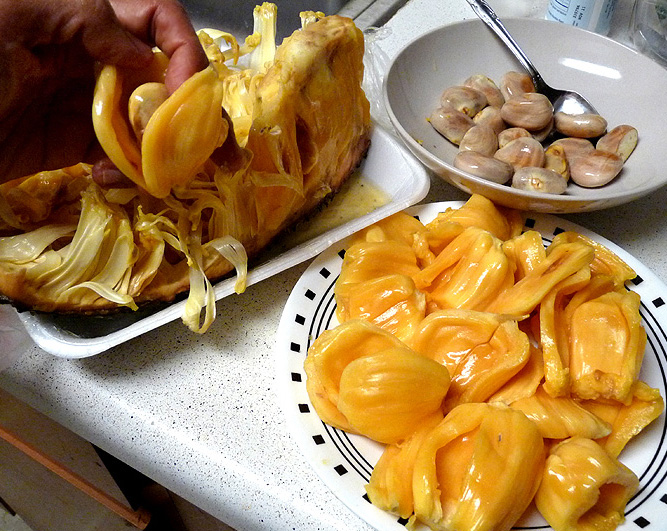
Extracting the arils and separating the seeds and flesh

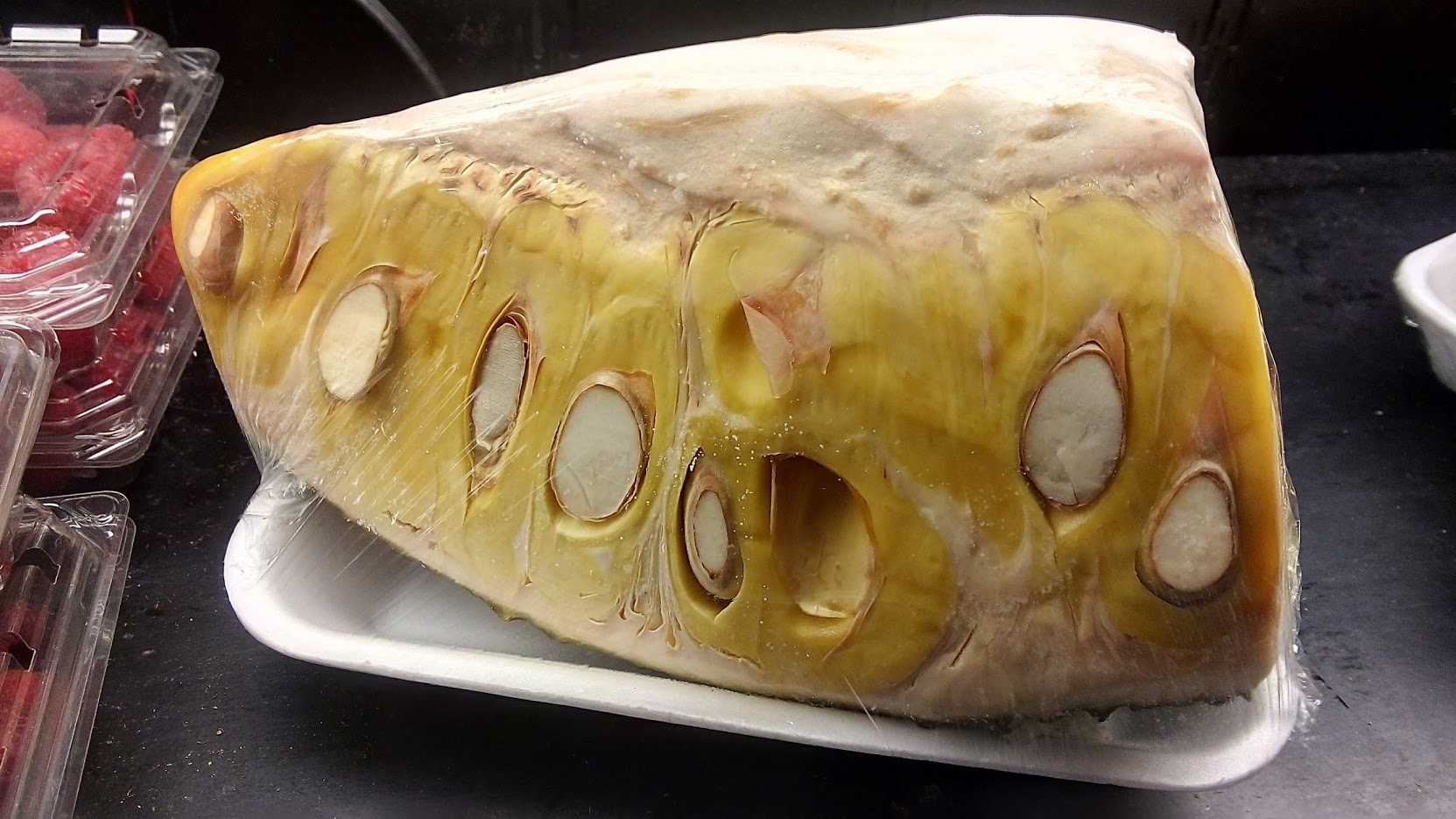
Sliced and packed jackfruit with seeds

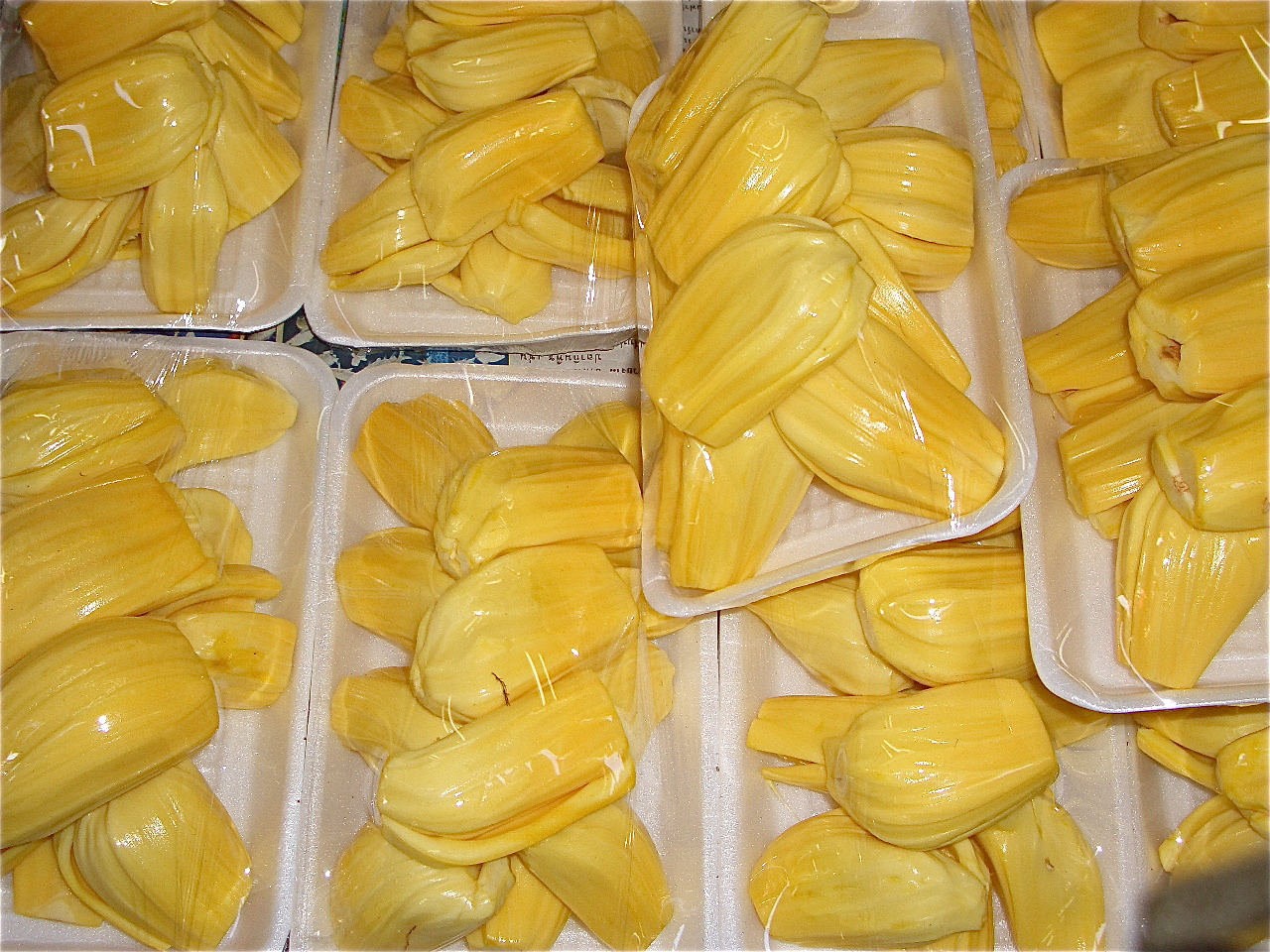
Packed jackfruit kernels sold in a market

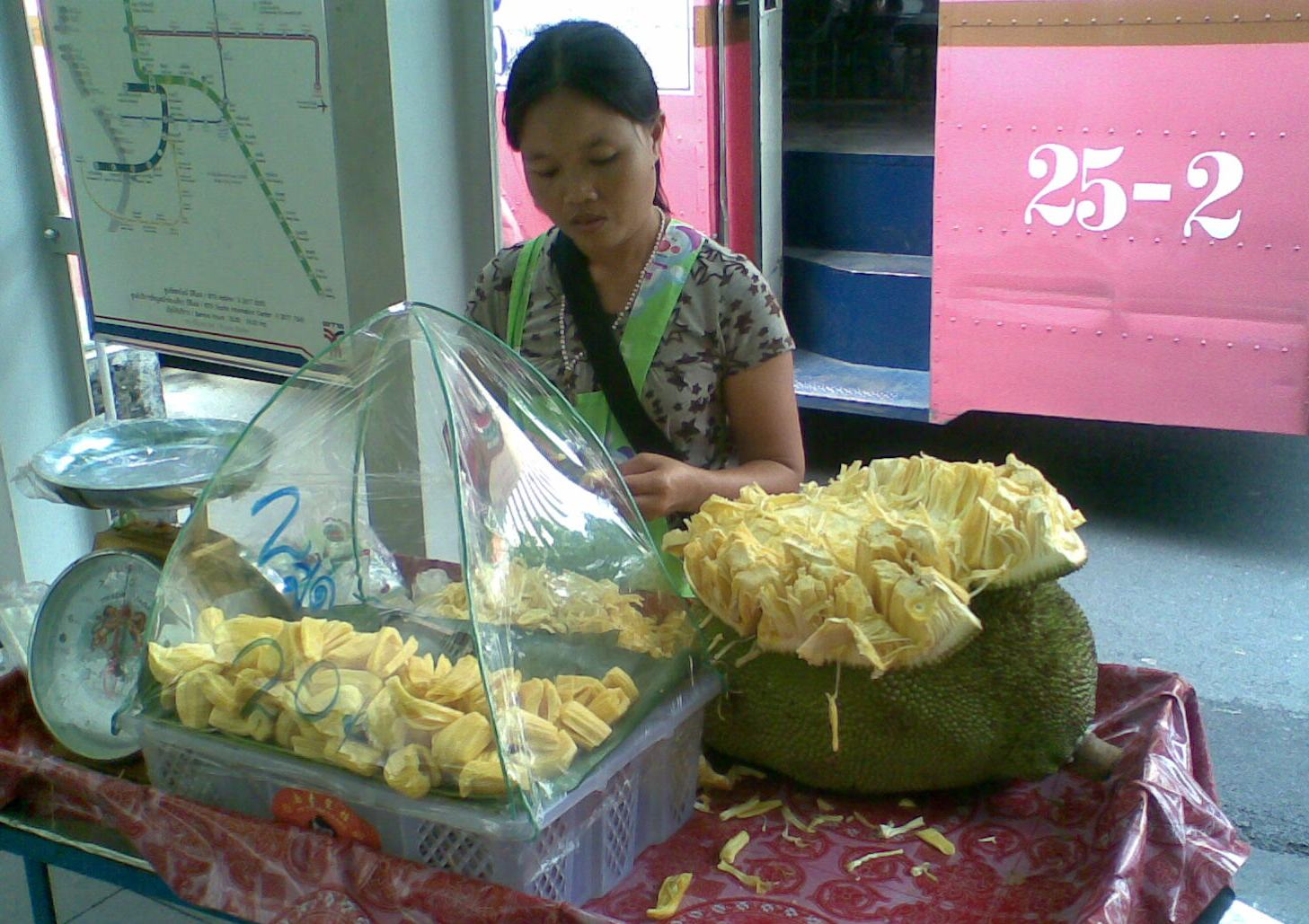
Typical jackfruit stall selling separated bulbs

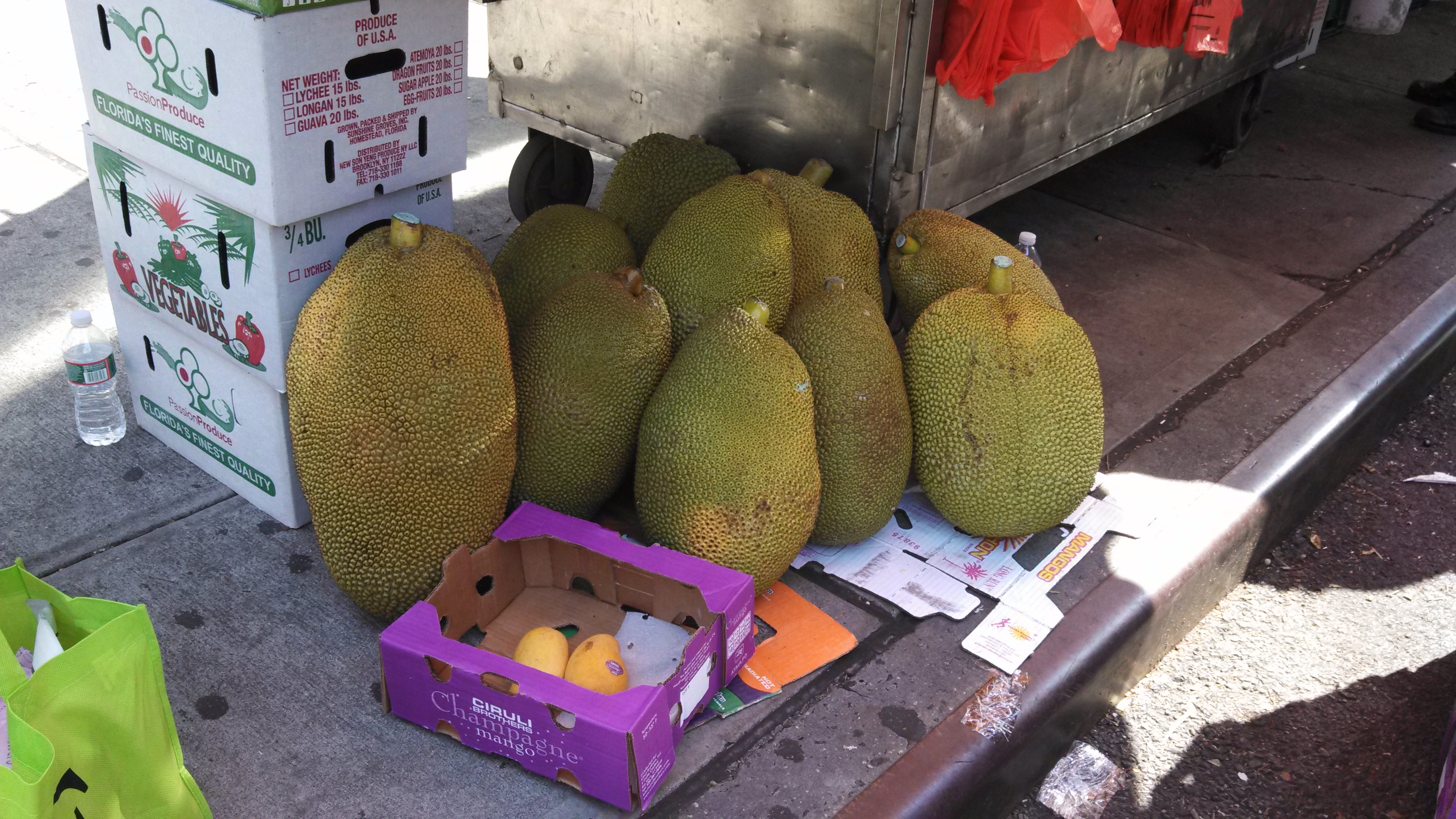
A fruit stand selling entire fruits

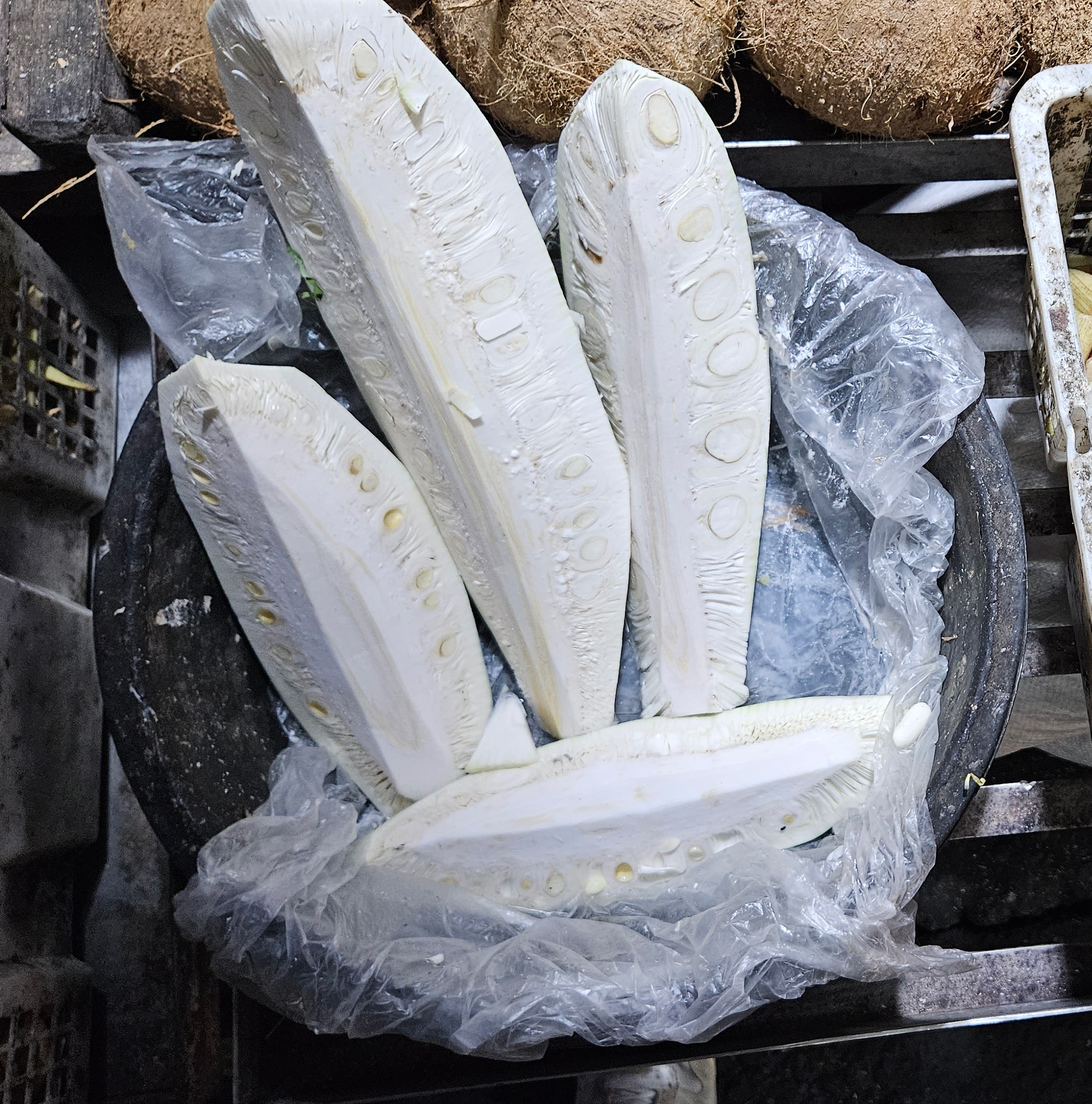
Slices of unripe jackfruit

== Nutrition ==
Jackfruit, raw
Nutritional value per 100 g (3.5 oz)
- Energy: 95 kcal (400 kJ)
- Carbohydrates: 23.25 g
- Sugars: 19.08 g
- Dietary fiber: 1.5 g
- Fat: 0.64 g
- Protein: 1.72 g
Vitamins and minerals
Vitamins	Quantity %DV^{†}
Vitamin A equiv. beta-Carotene lutein zeaxanthin	1% 5 μg 1% 61 μg 157 μg
Thiamine (B1)	9% 0.105 mg
Riboflavin (B2)	4% 0.055 mg
Niacin (B3)	6% 0.92 mg
Pantothenic acid (B5)	5% 0.235 mg
Vitamin B6	19% 0.329 mg
Folate (B9)	6% 24 μg
Vitamin C	15% 13.8 mg
Vitamin E	2% 0.34 mg
Minerals	Quantity %DV^{†}
Calcium	2% 24 mg
Iron	1% 0.23 mg
Magnesium	7% 29 mg
Manganese	2% 0.043 mg
Phosphorus	2% 21 mg
Potassium	15% 448 mg
Sodium	0% 2 mg
Zinc	1% 0.13 mg
- Other constituents: Quantity
- Water: 73.5 g
- Link to Full Nutrient Report of USDA FoodData Central
- ^{†}Percentages estimated using US recommendations for adults, except for potassium, which is estimated based on expert recommendation from the National Academies.

The edible raw pulp is 74% water, 23% carbohydrates, 2% protein, and 1% fat (table). The carbohydrate component is primarily sugars, and is a source of dietary fiber. In a reference amount of 100 grams (3.5 oz), raw jackfruit provides 95 kilocalories, and is a moderate source (10–19% of the Daily Value) of vitamin B_{6}, vitamin C, and potassium, with no appreciable content of other micronutrients (table).

== Culinary ==
The jackfruit is widely consumed in South and South East Asia, and is considered a partial solution for food security in developing countries. The ripe fruit gives a sweet flavor, with subtle pineapple- or banana-like aroma. The fruit bulbs are often eaten when ripe while both ripe and raw fruits are used in cuisine. Unripe jackfruit can be canned in brine or with curry, dried and stored in tins, or pickled when young and tender. Ripe jackfruit pulp can also be preserved using various methods. The canned fruit can be preserved for up to a year and is marketed as a meat alternative. The fruit pulp can be stored up to two years under suitable temperature.

The ripe jackfruit is used to make a variety of sweet dishes and desserts. It is made into jams, jellies, and mixed with sugar or honey to make candies and beverages. In India, the dried bulbs are fried in oil to make chips. The fruit bulbs can be fermented and distilled to produce liquor. Unripe jackfruit is used in various South Asian and South East Asian cuisine to make curry and other dishes. It is cooked with coconut milk to improve the flavor.

The seeds have a creamy taste, and are usually boiled or roasted before usage. It can be dried and salted and eaten as a snack. The seeds are also ground to flour which is used while making breads. The roasted seeds are also used as a commercial alternative to cocoa bean.

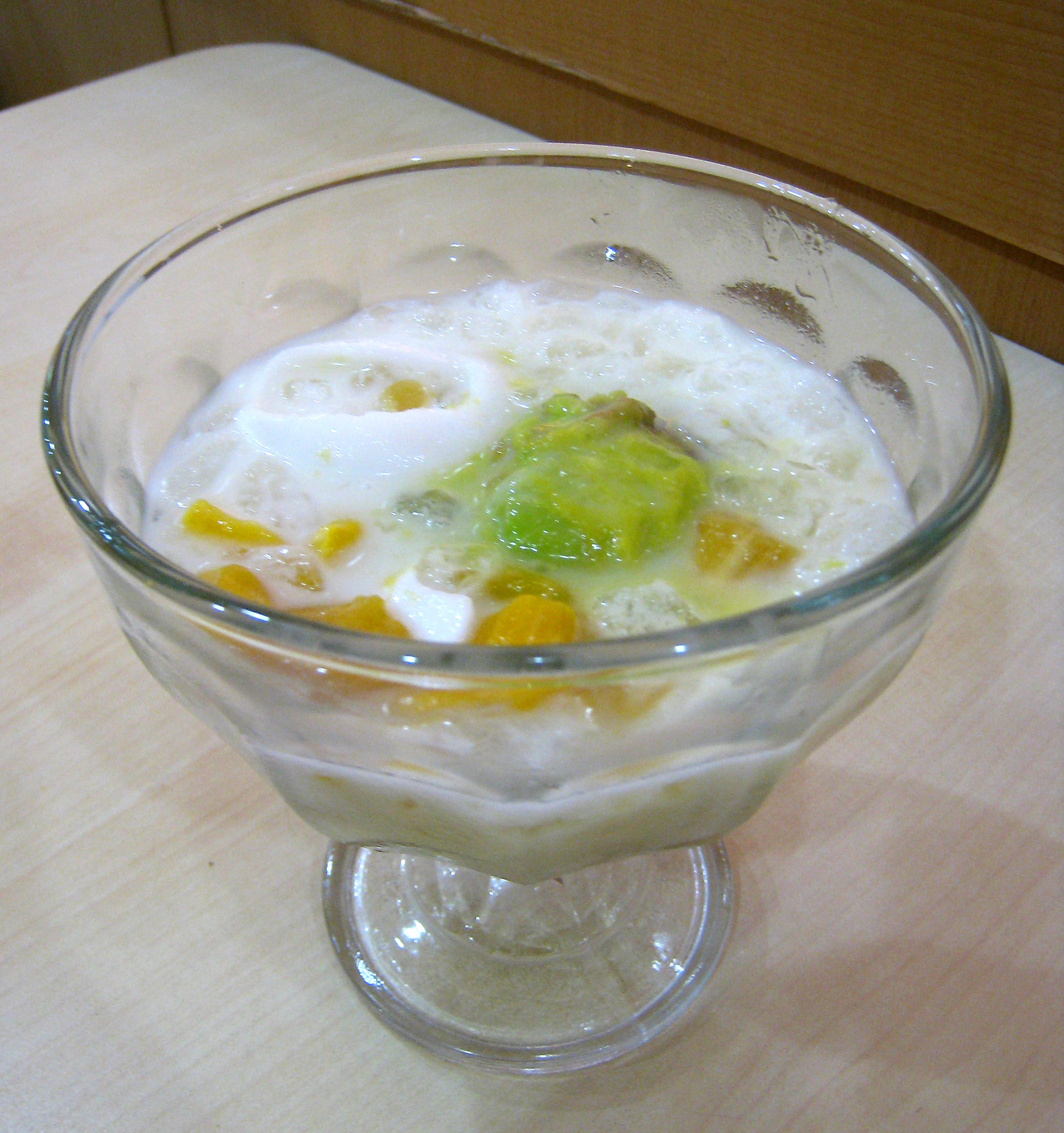
Es teler, fruit cocktail (Indonesia)

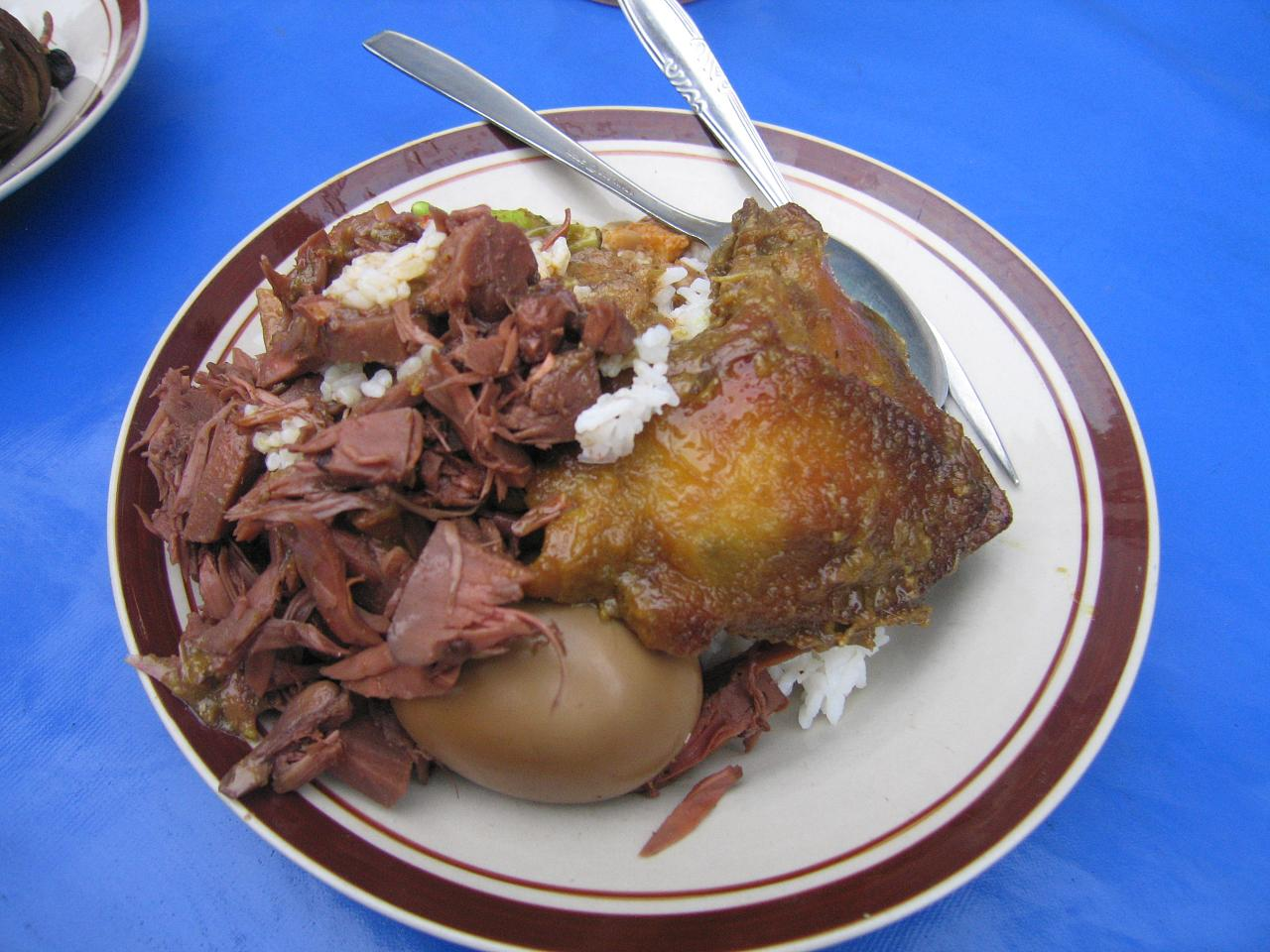
Gudeg (left), jackfruit curry with palm sugar (Indonesia)

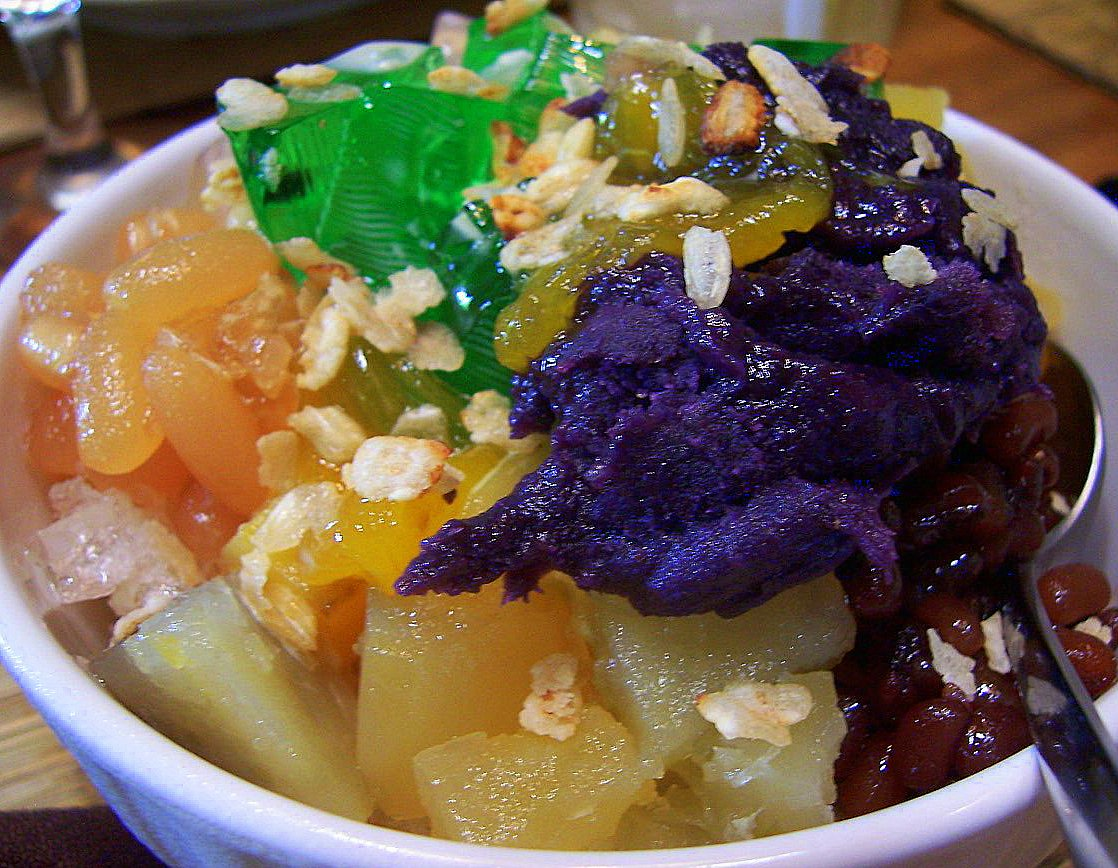
Halo-halo, shaved ice dessert (Philippines)

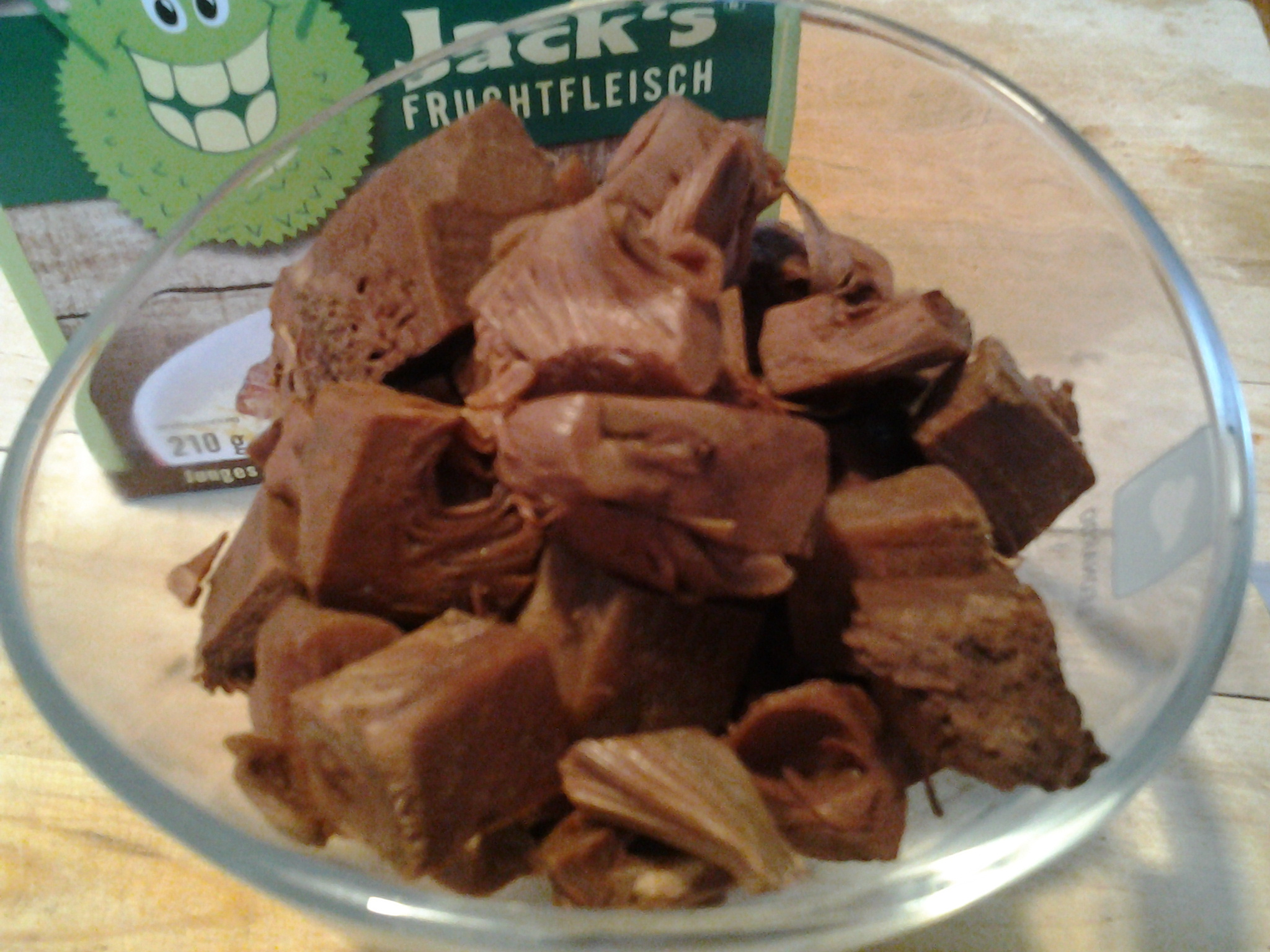
Chunks seasoned with spices as a meat substitute

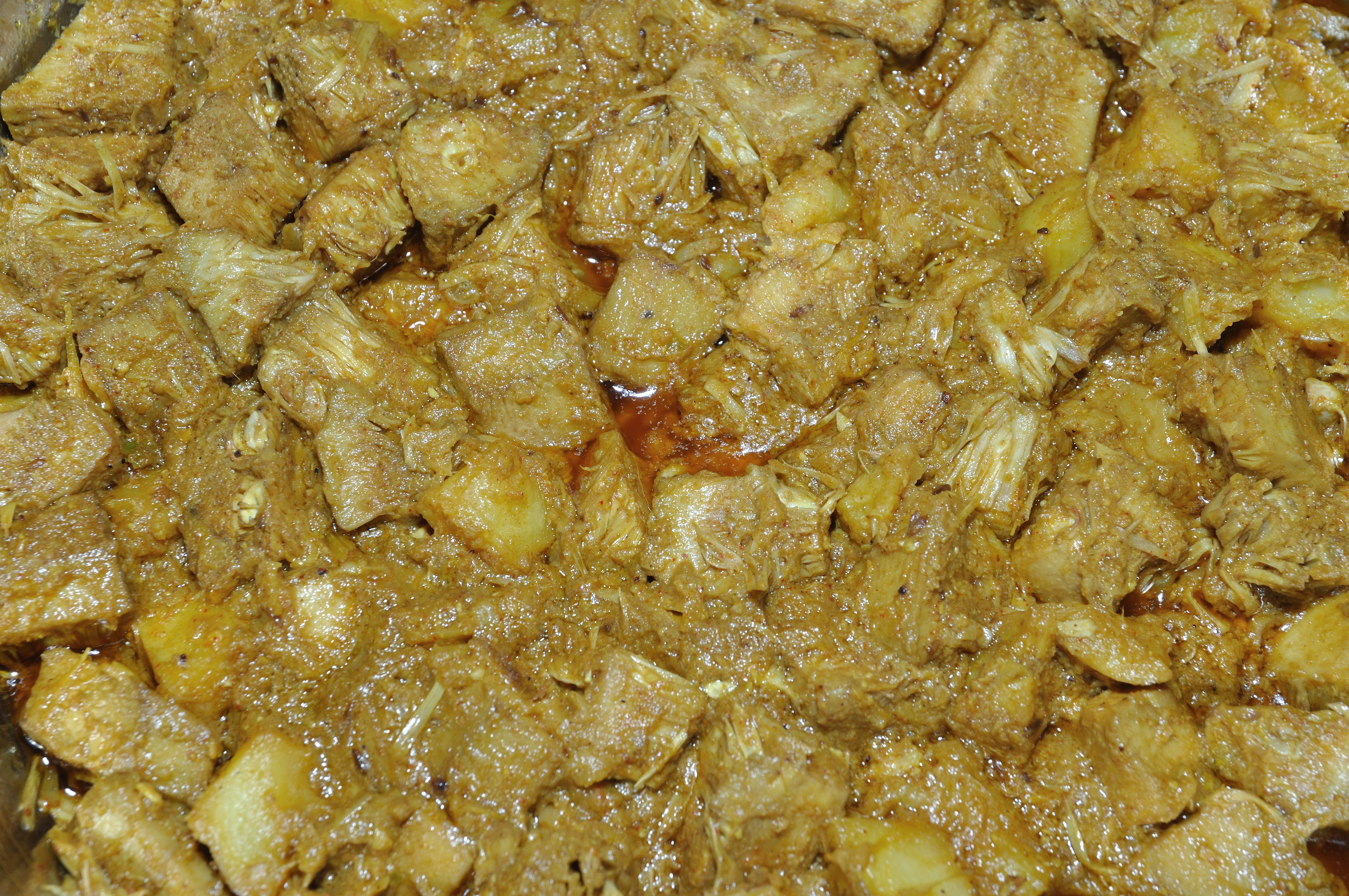
Raw jackfruit and potato curry (India)

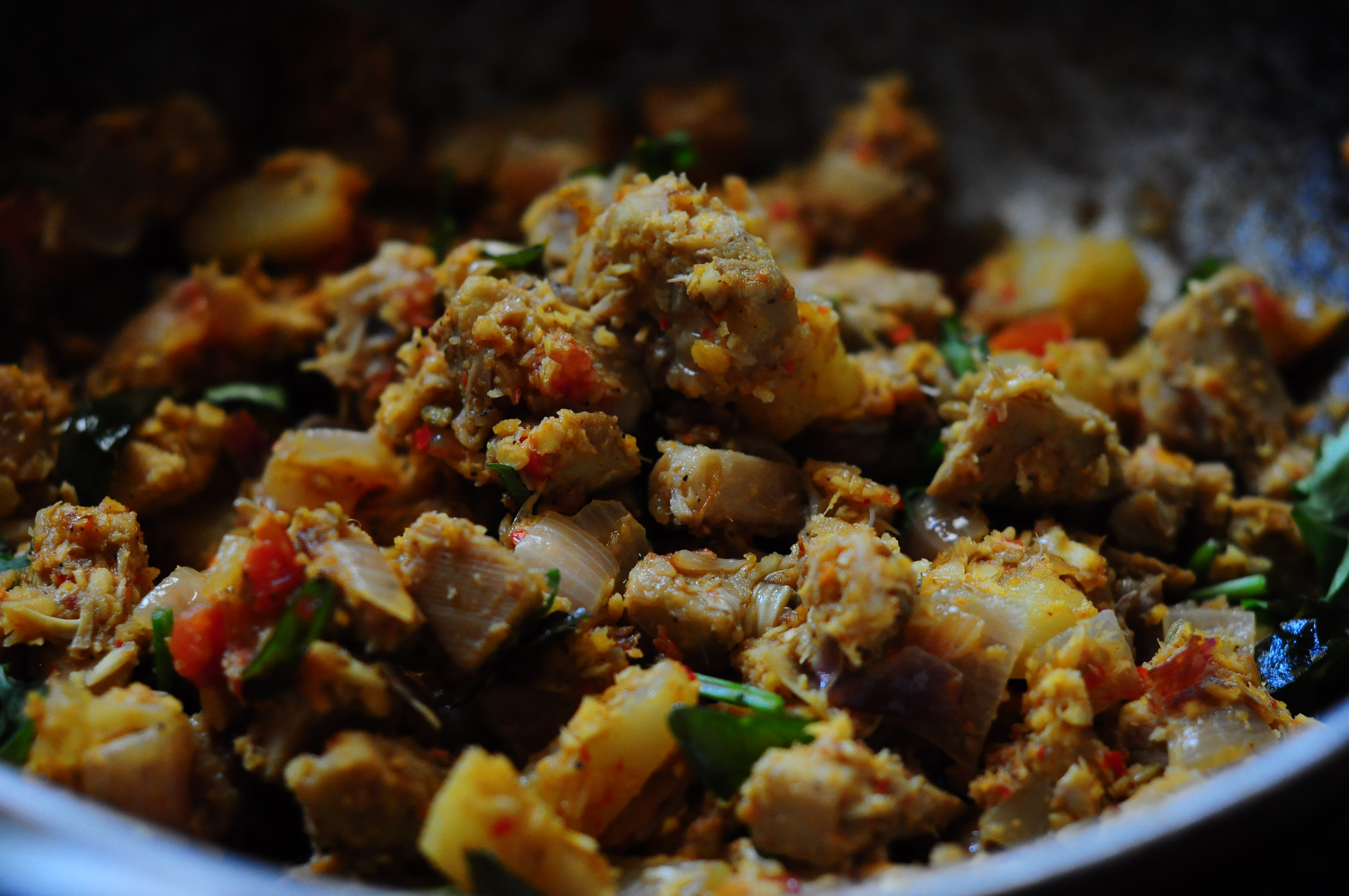
Jackfruit curry (India)

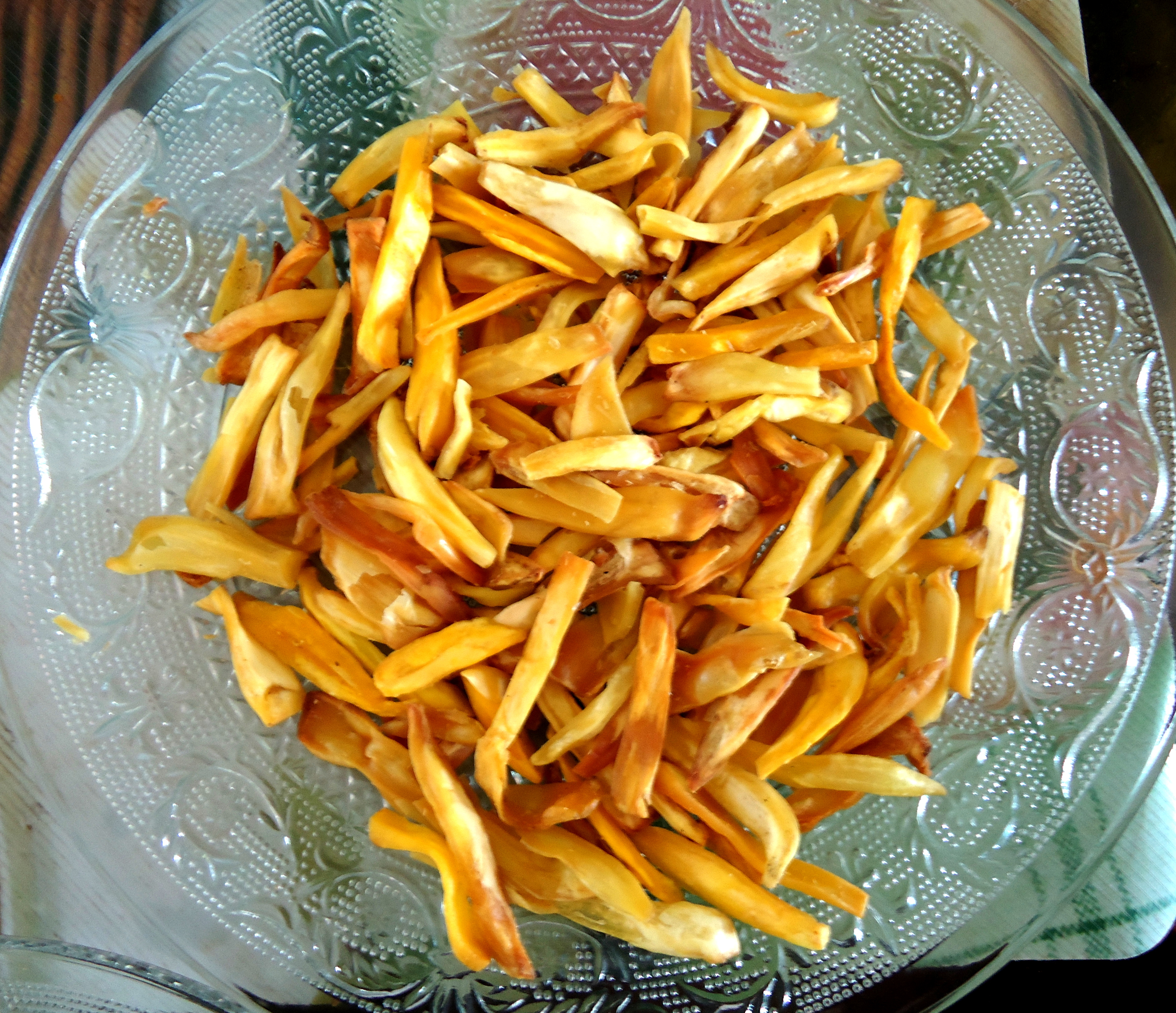
Chips fried in coconut oil (India)

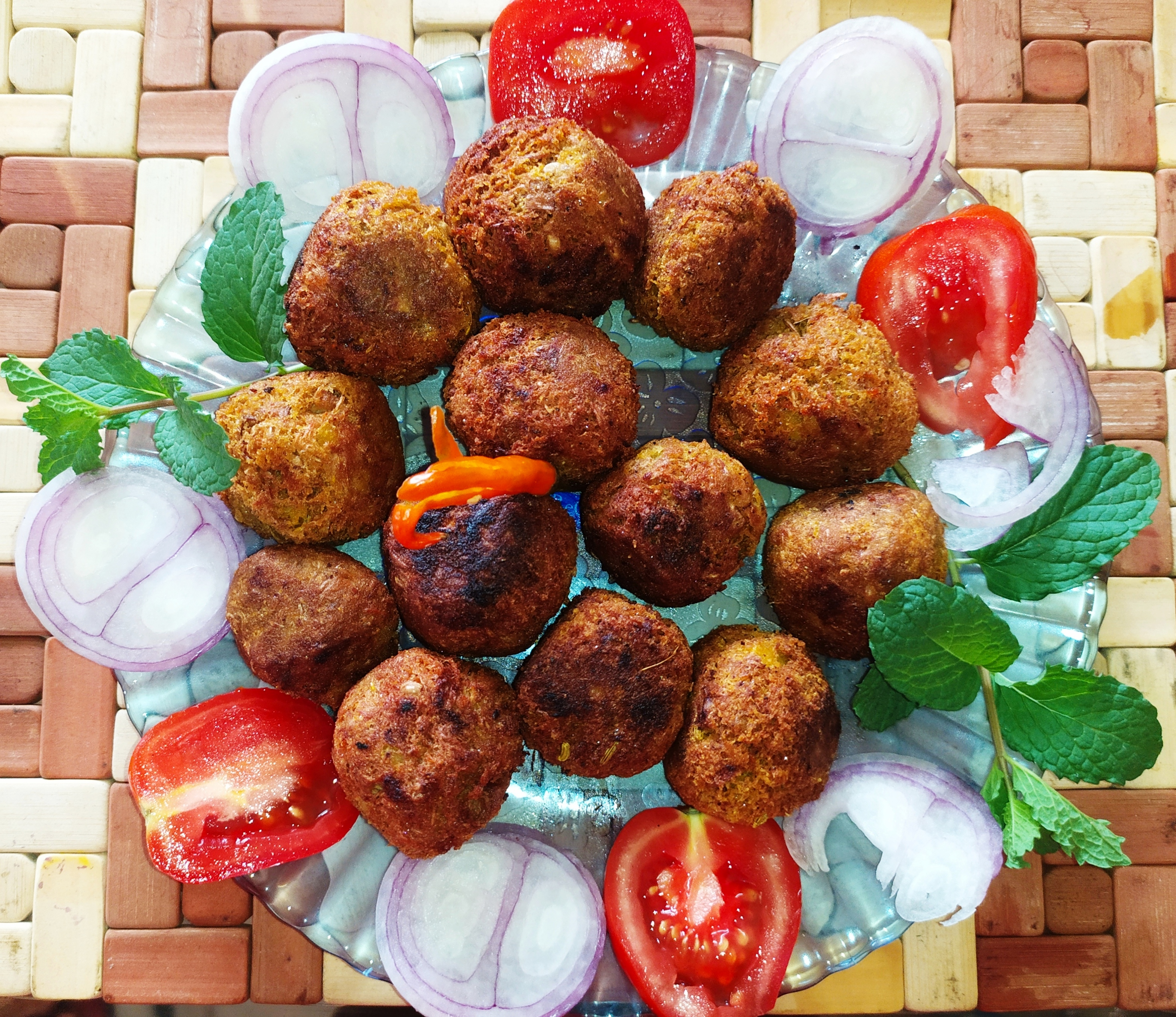
Jackfruit cutlet (India)

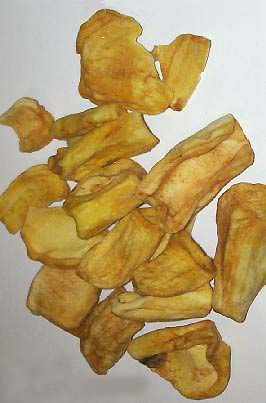
Kripik nangka fries (Indonesia)

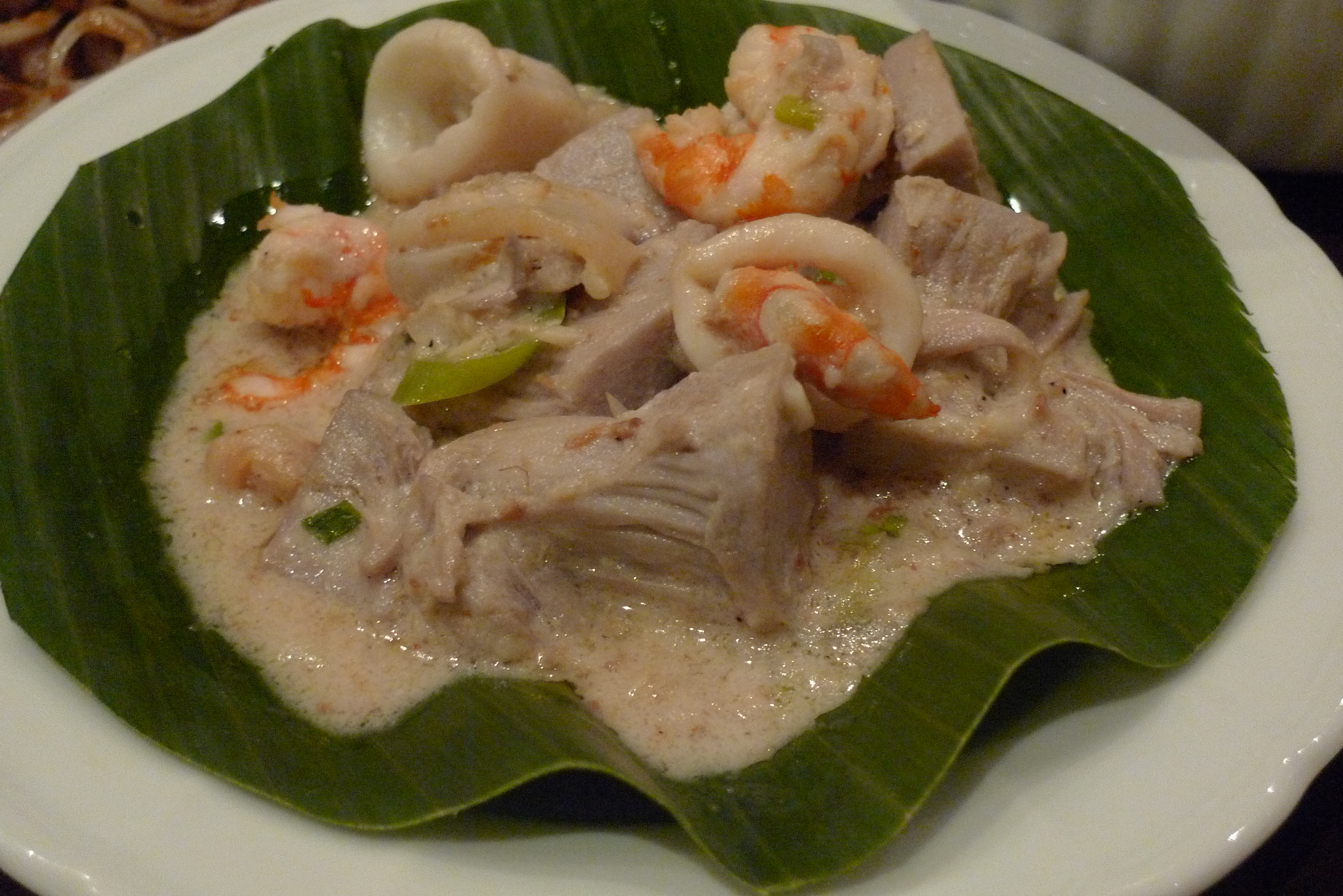
Ginataang langka, jackfruit in coconut milk (Philippines)

== Other uses ==
Jackfruit bark, pulp, and seeds have been used in traditional medicine. In traditional medicine, it is used as a natural coolant and an antidote to alcohol. The roots are used for the treatment of fever, asthma, diarrhea, and skin diseases, and the leaves are used as an antiseptic to treat wounds. The bark is used as an anesthetic and the ash is mixed with other ingredients such as coconut oil to treat ulcers. The seeds and the dried sap are considered as aphrodisiacs, and the sap is mixed with vinegar to make an antidote to snakebite.

The tree leaves are eaten by cattle and other herbivorous grazing animals. The tree also shelters birds, and a range of insects. After extracting the fruit bulbs, the remnants are often used as fodder. The leaves may be attached together to be used as plates to serve food or wrap food items. The sap from the tree is used as a disinfectant due to its bacterial resistance. The latex is also heated to make a glue, which is used to mend utensils, and boats. It is also mixed with other oils and used as birdlime.

Jackfruit tree wood is termite and fungi resistant and is used extensively in furniture making and construction. It is used to make oars, wooden barrels, tools, and other implements. The wood is also used for making Buddha statues in monasteries. It is also used extensively to make musical instruments, including the Indian string instrument veena. Wood splinters are used to collect toddy from coconut trees. Dry twigs and branches are used during homa rituals in Hinduism. A cloth dye is extracted from the tree bark. The saw dust and wooden fragments are used to create a yellow dye used to colour the cotton robes of Buddhist monks.

== Culture and symbolism ==
Jackfruit is the national fruit of Bangladesh and Sri Lanka. It is the state fruit of the Indian states of Kerala and Tamil Nadu.

== See also ==
- Domesticated plants and animals of Austronesia
- Chempedak, a closely related Southeast Asian fruit sometimes confused with jackfruit
- Durian, a fruit similar in appearance but from an unrelated tree, also from Southeast Asia
