= Nallathambi =

Nallathambi (Tamil: நல்லதம்பி) is a Tamil male given name. could refer to any of the following:

== Film ==
- Nallathambi (1949 film)
- Nalla Thambi 1985 film

== People ==
- A. Nallathambi (AIADMK politician) Indian politician and MLA from Gangavalli, Tamil Nadu
- A. Nallathambi (DMK politician) Indian politician and MLA from Tirupattur, Tamil Nadu
- K. Nalla Thambi Indian politician and MLA from Egmore, Tamil Nadu
- M. Nallathambi Sri Lankan Tamil poet, scholar and teacher.
- Kanthar Nallathamby Srikantha Sri Lankan Tamil lawyer, politician
- Pammal Nallathambi Indian politician and MLA from Tambaram, Tamil Nadu
- Ramani Nallathambi Indian politician and MLA from Radhapuram, Tamil Nadu
- Vallipuram Nallathamby Navaratnam Sri Lankan Tamil lawyer, politician
