= Lists of national symbols =

These are lists of national symbols:

- List of national animals
- List of national anthems
- List of national birds
- List of national dances
- List of national emblems
- List of national flags
- List of national flowers
- List of national founders
- List of national fruits
- List of national instruments (music)
- List of national mottos
- List of national poets
- List of national trees

== By country ==
- Canada
- India
- Iran
- Israel
- Kuwait
- Pakistan
- Palestine
- Philippines
- Sri Lanka
- Spain
- United Kingdom
- United States

== See also ==
- National colours
- National dish
- National epic
- National god
- National sport
