= List of Kerala state symbols =

This is a list of state symbols of the State of Kerala in India.

== State Symbols ==
Title	Symbol	Image	Notes
State banner	Banner of Kerala കേരള ഔദ്യോഗിക ബാവുട; Banner of Kerala		Kerala does not have an officially recognised state flag; the Government of Kerala can be represented by a banner displaying the state emblem on a white field.
State emblem	Emblem of Kerala കേരള ഔദ്യോഗിക ചിഹ്നം Emblem of Kerala		The state emblem is a derivative of the royal coat of arms of the Kingdom of Travancore, depicting two elephants guarding a conch (shanku) associated with Sree Padmanabha, crested by the Lion Capital of Ashoka. The present form was adopted in 1960 under the government of Pattom A. Thanu Pillai, replacing an interim 1957 design; a 2011 general administration department order repositioned the national motto to sit beneath the Lion Capital rather than between the elephants, in line with the design of the State Emblem of India.
State motto	Satyameva Jayate സത്യമേവ ജയതെ Truth Alone Triumphs		Satyameva Jayate is the national motto of India, drawn from the Mundaka Upanishad, and is inscribed in Devanagari script on the state emblem beneath the Lion Capital of Ashoka rather than rendered as a distinct Malayalam-language state motto.
State foundation day	Kerala Piravi കേരള പിറവി Kerala Day		Kerala Piravi commemorates the formation of the state on 1 November 1956, when the States Reorganisation Act merged the princely states of Travancore and Cochin with the Malabar district and the Kasaragod taluk of South Canara.
State language	Malayalam മലയാളം Malayalam		Malayalam is a Dravidian language native to Kerala, where it is the sole official language, and is one of the twenty-two scheduled languages of India as well as one of its designated classical languages.
State animal	Indian elephant ആന; Indian elephant Elephas maximus indicus		The Indian elephant is closely woven into Kerala's temple festivals and ceremonial processions, and is also the state animal of Karnataka and Jharkhand.
State bird	Great hornbill മലമുഴക്കി വേഴാമ്പൽ; Great hornbill Buceros bicornis		The great hornbill is a large frugivore of Kerala's Western Ghats rainforests, notable for its prominent casque and its ecological role in dispersing the seeds of forest trees.
State butterfly	Malabar banded peacock ബുദ്ധമയൂരി Malabar banded Peacock; Papilio buddha		The Malabar banded peacock is a large swallowtail butterfly endemic to the Western Ghats, declared the state butterfly of Kerala, making Kerala one of several Indian states—along with Maharashtra, Uttarakhand, Karnataka and Tamil Nadu—to designate an official state butterfly.
State amphibian	Malabar gliding frog മലബാർ പറക്കും തവള; Malabar gliding frog Rhacophorus malabaricus		The Malabar gliding frog is an arboreal tree frog of the Western Ghats capable of gliding leaps of several metres between trees.
State fish	Green chromide കരിമീൻ; Green chromide Etroplus suratensis		Locally called karimeen, the green chromide is a cichlid fish of Kerala's brackish backwaters and a staple of Kerala cuisine; the state government declared it the official state fish in July 2010 and observed 2010–11 as "The Year of the Karimeen" to promote its cultivation.
State flower	Golden shower tree കണിക്കൊന്ന; Golden shower tree Cassia fistula	Golden shower	Known as kanikonna, the golden shower tree's yellow blossoms are a central motif of the Vishu harvest festival, when they are traditionally viewed first thing in the morning for good fortune.
State fruit	Jackfruit ചക്ക; Jackfruit; Artocarpus heterophyllus		The jackfruit, cultivated across Kerala for centuries, was declared the state fruit on 21 March 2018 on a proposal of the state Agriculture Department, recognising its economic and nutritional value.
State tree	Coconut tree തെങ്ങ് Coconut tree Cocos nucifera		The coconut palm underpins much of Kerala's traditional economy, from cuisine and oil to coir production, and gives the state one of its popular etymologies (Keralam, "land of coconuts").
State microbe	Bacillus subtilis ബാകിലസ് സബ്ടിലിസ് Bacillus subtilis		Declared Kerala's state microbe in January 2026, making Kerala the first Indian state to designate an official state microbe.

== See also ==
- List of Indian state symbols
- Emblems of Indian States
