= Lionel Edirisinghe =

- Born: January 17, 1913; Baddegama, British Ceylon
- Origin: Sri Lankan (Sinhalese)
- Died: 22 May 1988 (aged 75) Sri Lanka
- Genre: Sri Lankan music
- Occupation: musicologist
- Years active: 1934–1988

Lionel Edirisinghe (17 January 1913 – 22 May 1988) was a renowned Sri Lankan musicologist and the inaugural principal at the University of the Visual & Performing Arts.

== Biography ==
Edirisinghe was born on 17 January 1913 at Baddegama in the Galle District, Southern Province, Sri Lanka. He received his primary and secondary education from the Meepavala Buddhist School, Richmond College and Mahinda College. While he was having his secondary education at Mahinda College, he acted in stage dramas like Sakunthala, Ramayanaya, Wessanthara and Sri Wickrama and was a leading member of college choir as well.

He then studied at the Visva-Bharati University in Santiniketan, West Bengal, where he was a classmate of Indira Gandhi. They had a romantic relationship, which was cut short due to her mother’s illness. Whenever Gandhi visited Sri Lanka (mostly in the 1970s during the premiership of Sirimavo Bandaranaike), she would always meet Edirisinghe and his family. Edirisinghe then studied at Bhatkhande College of Music in Lucknow, where he was the first Sinhalese to graduate with a Visharada degree, a few months ahead of compatriot, Sunil Santha.

Upon his return to Ceylon he was appointed the Chief Inspector of Music, at the Ministry of Education, which coincided with music becoming a subject in the schools curriculum. In 1948 Edrisinghe was selected to be a part of Lanka Gandharva Sabha's judging panel to determine the country's national anthem. The winning entry, Sri Lanka Matha Pala Yasa Mahima, was a controversial selection as it was written by P. B. Elangasinha and the music was by Edrisinghe, both of whom were on the judging panel. Ultimately the government in 1951 selected Namo Namo Matha to become the national anthem.

Edirsinghe then became the founding principal of the Government College of Fine Arts (Music) in October 1953, which is now known as the University of the Visual & Performing Arts. His talents were acknowledged by greats such as Rabindranath Tagore and Mahatma Gandhi. In 1986 he was awarded with the honorary title of 'Kalashoori'.

Edirisinghe died on 22 May 1988.
