= National symbols of Sri Lanka =

Sri Lanka

The national symbols of Sri Lanka are the national anthem, flag, emblem, flower, tree, bird, butterfly, gemstone and sport. They represent the country and its people within Sri Lanka and abroad as well as traditions, culture, history and geography. Several other symbols do not have official acknowledgment as national symbols but are considered national symbols at the local level.

The Constitution of the Democratic Socialist Republic of Sri Lanka sets out the national flag, the national anthem, the national day and the national language. The constitution was promulgated by the National State Assembly on 7 September 1978. On 14 November 1987 the Sri Lankan Parliament passed the Thirteenth Amendment to the Constitution of Sri Lanka, which made both Sinhala and Tamil the national languages.

== National symbols ==
Title	Symbol	Media	Notes
National anthem	"Sri Lanka Matha"		The national anthem of Sri Lanka "Sri Lanka Matha" is believed to have been written by Rabindranath Tagore and later composed by Ananda Samarakoon in 1940 before the island nation's independence from the British. In 1951, it became the national anthem of Sri Lanka. Firstly, it was written in Sinhalese and translated to Tamil. The first performance of the anthem was held in the fourth anniversary of independence day on 4 February 1952.
National flag	Flag of Sri Lanka	Flag of Sri Lanka	The national flag of Sri Lanka consists of a lion holding a sword in its right fore paw by representing the Sinhalese people and first king. Dark red/maroon background represents Buddhist symbol. Four golden-yellow bo leaves, one in each corner represent Four Sublime States. Around the background is a yellow border that represents Buddhist monk's community. On the left side, two vertical stripes in green and saffron represent Moors and Tamil communities. The current flag was adopted in 1950.
National emblem	National emblem of Sri Lanka	Emblem of Sri Lanka	The national emblem of Sri Lanka used by Sri Lankan government is in connection with the administrative purpose and government of the country. The current republican emblem was adopted in 1972 after the country was declared as a republic state. The emblem has a lion, holding a sword in its right fore paw on a maroon background encircled with petals of a blue lotus. Also it features a bunch of paddy, grain vase (punkalasa), dhammachakka, sun and moon.
National language	Sinhala / Tamil	Sinhalese language Tamil language	The national languages of Sri Lanka are Sinhalese and Tamil. As per Chapter IV (Language), Article 19 of Constitution of Sri Lanka Sinhalese and Tamil have been recognised as national languages.
National flower	Blue water lily flower (Nymphahea Stellata )		The blue water lily was declared the national flower of Sri Lanka on 26 February 1986. It is found in all parts of the island and grows mainly in shallow water. The flower is considered a symbol of truth, purity and discipline. It has connections with Buddha and was used as ceremonial flower in Sri Lanka throughout history.
National tree	Ceylon ironwood (Mesua ferrea)	Ceylon ironwood	Ceylon ironwood (naa) was declared the national tree of Sri Lanka on 26 February 1986. It was chosen as the national tree due to its endemism in Sri Lanka, utility, historic & cultural importance, exterior posture, wide distribution, colour and nature and ability to draw and sketch easily. Theravada Buddhism considers this tree for achieved enlightenment. The tree has been utilised for various purposes since ancient times.
National bird	Sri Lankan junglefowl (Gallus lafayetii)	Sri Lankan junglefowl	The Sri Lankan junglefowl is the official national bird. The colourful bird is endemic to Sri Lanka and commonly found in national parks, jungle and dense scrub. It is an endemic bird of Sri Lanka.
National butterfly	Sri Lankan birdwing (Troides darsius)	Sri Lankan birdwing	Sri Lankan birdwing is endemic to Sri Lanka and was declared as the national butterfly with a connection to the butterfly conservation action plan. The largest Sri Lankan butterfly was categorised as flagship species due to its wide distribution. It has glossy black and bright yellow colours and an attractive pattern.
National gemstone	Blue sapphire	Blue sapphire	The blue sapphire was declared the national gemstone of Sri Lanka in October 2003. A postage stamp worth LKR 4.50 was issued on 2 October 2003 to mark the announcement. Sri Lanka is famous for blue sapphires, especially known for their size.
National sport	Volleyball	Volleyball	Volleyball was officially recognised as the national sport of Sri Lanka in 1991. The sport was introduced in 1916 to Sri Lanka. However, there is an opinion that Sri Lankans played a similar sport before its introduction. Elle had recognition as a national sport before volleyball.

== Unofficial ==
The following national symbols are not officially recognised.

Title	Symbol	Media	Notes
National animal
National animal	Sri Lankan elephant (Elephas maximus maximus)	Sri Lankan elephant	There is no official national animal in Sri Lanka even though the elephant, lion, and Grizzled giant squirrel are locally considered as such. Lions are the most celebrated animal for Sinhalese people, symbolising heraldry. The Sri Lankan lion is a prehistoric subspecies of lion.
National animal	Lion (Panthera leo)	Lion	There is no official national animal in Sri Lanka even though the elephant, lion, and Grizzled giant squirrel are locally considered as such. Lions are the most celebrated animal for Sinhalese people, symbolising heraldry. The Sri Lankan lion is a prehistoric subspecies of lion.
National monument	Independence Memorial Hall	Independence Memorial Hall	Independence Memorial Hall is an iconic structure commemorating the independence of Sri Lanka from the British rule. Named "Magul Maduwa" (Celebration Hall), its structure is based on the Royal Audience Hall of the Kingdom of Kandy, the last kingdom that fell to colonial occupation in the island. It also known as Independence Commemoration Hall and Independence Commemoration Hall.
National dress	Sarong and shirt (men); Osariya (women)	Girl wearing a saree	Sri Lanka does not acknowledge any national dress since there are three major communities and a few minor communities. Commonly, men's traditional dress is the sarong/dhoti and shirt and women's traditional dress is a sari. The three major communities (Sinhalese, Tamils, Muslims) have significant differences in their regional dress although the majority of them wear Western dress today.
National dish	Rice and curry	Rice and curry	Rice and curry is a popular dish in Sri Lanka. The dish has cooked rice with various curry dishes of vegetable and/or meat.

== See also ==
- Outline of Sri Lanka
- Timeline of Sri Lankan history
- Lists of national symbols
