= National symbol =

Symbol of a national community

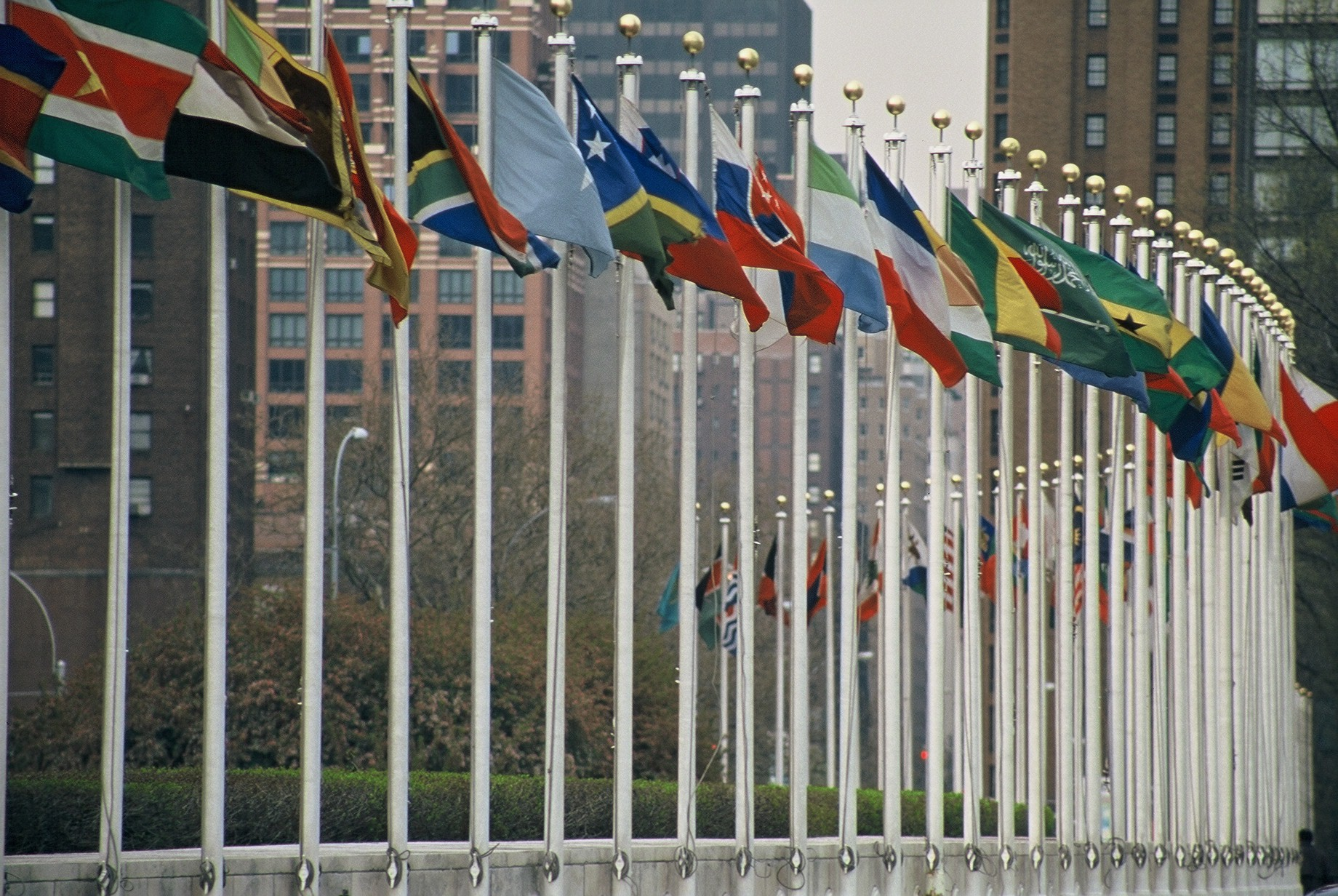
The national flags of United Nations members flown outside the UN Headquarters. Flags are a common national symbol used by sovereign states.

A national symbol is a manifestation of a nation or community, serving as a representation of their identity and values. National symbols may be not only applied to sovereign states but also nations and countries in a state of colonial or other forms of dependence, federal integration, or even ethnocultural communities that identify as a "nationality" despite lacking autonomy.

National symbols intend to unite individuals by creating visual, verbal, or iconic representations of the national people, values, goals, culture or history. These symbols are often rallied around as part of celebrations of patriotism or aspiring nationalism (such as independence, autonomy or separation movements) and are designed to be inclusive and representative of all the people of the national community.

== Common official national symbols ==
- The flag or banner of a state
- The coat of arms or national emblem of the nation or ruling dynasty
- The seal or stamp of the nation or ruling dynasty
- A national bird
- A national animal
- The head of state, especially in a monarchy
- The associated device and motto can also be used separately
- The national colors, often derived from the above
- Abstract symbols
- National anthems, royal and imperial hymns; alongside such official hymns custom may also recognize the national symbol values of very popular songs

Some official national symbols like seals are insignias that not everybody is allowed to use.

== Unofficial national symbols ==
In many ways, well-known landmarks in a country can also be seen as national symbols, as can traditional items of handicraft, folk costumes, natural monuments, national epics and national myths, as well as symbols used by national sports teams and their supporters.

== See also ==
- Lists of national symbols
- Cultural icon
- Floral emblem
- National cockade
- Religion in national symbols
