= M. Nallathambi =

- முருகப்பிள்ளை நல்லதம்பி
- Born: 13 September 1896; Vaddukoddai, Jaffna district, Sri Lanka
- Died: 8 May 1951
- Occupation(s): Tamil poet, scholar and teacher
- Known for: Tamil national anthem
- Parent(s): Muruga Pillai, Thangammayarukkam

Muruggapillai Nallathambi was a Sri Lankan Tamil poet, scholar and teacher. He was born on 13 September 1899 and died on 8 May 1951. He is popular for translating the Sri Lankan national anthem into Tamil which is an official language of the country along with Sinhalese. Translation was officially accepted from 1950 and is still being used in areas where Tamil is widely spoken, especially in Northern and Eastern Sri Lanka.

== Biography ==
Nallathambi was born in Vadukkottai, in Jaffna district, the son of Muruga Pillai and Thangamma. He learnt literary grammar from Thenkovai and Pandit S Kanthayapillai. Later he worked as a Tamil scholar and teacher at Zahira College, Colombo and visiting lecturer at the University of Colombo, he was instrumental in promoting the language amongst many Muslims and other prominent people amongst his own community. His works have been widely quoted by many scholars and journalists.

== Poetry ==
Pandit Nallathamby received an honorary title "Muthu Tamil Pulavar" from Thirunelvely Tamil Sangam, South India, in 1940. He also won the first prize for his collection of poems titled Maniththaai Nadum Marathan Oddamum (Mother Lanka and Marathon Relay), in 1950, by participating in a poetry competition organised by the Sri Lankan government to mark the country's independence in 1948. His books Eezhavasakam and Mozhi Payirchi were used as school texts. A collection of his children poems "Ilaignar Virunthu" was published after his death.

== Tamil National Anthem ==
Most Sri Lankans agree that Ananda Samarakoon wrote the lyrics to the anthem in 1940, being inspired by Bengali poet Rabindranath Tagore. The anthem was translated into Tamil by Nallathambi in 1950 under the title "Sri Lanka Thaye". In 2010, The Sunday Times reported that the government were to scrap the Tamil translation of the anthem. In 2016, President Maithripala Sirisena lifted the unofficial ban on the Tamil anthem and it was sung at independence day celebrations. In 2020, the government stopped using the anthem in these celebrations.
