= Sri Lanka Matha =

National anthem of Sri Lanka

Śrī Laṅkā Mātā Srī Laṅkā Tāyē
English: Mother Sri Lanka
- Sri Lanka Matha
- National anthem of Sri Lanka
- Also known as: ශ්‍රී ලංකා මාතා ஸ்ரீ லங்கா தாயே
- Lyrics: Ananda Samarakoon (Sinhala); M. Nallathambi (Tamil), 1940
- Music: Ananda Samarakoon
- Adopted: 1951

Audio sample
- 2017 U.S. Navy Band instrumental version: file; help

The "Sri Lanka Matha" (English: "Mother Sri Lanka"; Sinhala: ශ්‍රී ලංකා මාතා, romanized: Śrī Laṅkā Mātā; Tamil: ஸ்ரீ லங்கா தாயே, romanized: Srī Laṅkā Tāyē) is the national anthem of Sri Lanka. "Sri Lanka Matha" was composed by Ananda Samarakoon and was originally titled "Namo Namo Matha" ("Salute! Salute! Motherland").

"Sri Lanka Matha" was first performed at an official ceremony on 4 February 1949 at the Independence Memorial Hall in Torrington Square during the national day ceremony. The anthem was given full constitutional recognition in the 1978 Second Republican Constitution.

== History ==
2003 U.S. Navy Band instrumental version

There are differing accounts as to the origin of the "Sri Lanka Matha". The most widely held view is that Sri Lankan composer Ananda Samarakoon wrote the music and lyrics to the song, inspired/influenced by the Indian Bengali poet Rabindranath Tagore. A minority suggest that Tagore wrote the anthem in full. Some have suggested that Tagore composed the music whilst Samarakoon wrote the lyrics. Tagore being directly involved in the creation of the song has been denied by some historians including Indian Lipi Ghosh and Sri Lankan Sandagomi Coperahewa. Samarakoon had been a pupil of Tagore at Visva-Bharati University, Santiniketan. After returning to Ceylon Samarakoon taught music at Mahinda College, Galle. The song, which was then known as "Namo Namo Mata", was first sung by students at Mahinda College. After it was sung by the choir from Musaeus College, Colombo at a public event it became hugely popular in Ceylon and was widely played on radio.

Prior to Ceylon's independence (1948) the Lanka Gandharva Sabha had organised a competition to find a national anthem. Among the entries were "Namo Namo Matha" by Samarakoon and "Sri Lanka Matha Pala Yasa Mahima" by P. B. Illangasinghe and Lionel Edirisinghe. The latter won the competition but this was controversial as Illangasinghe and Edirisinghe were members of the judging panel. "Sri Lanka Matha Pala Yasa Mahima" was broadcast by Radio Ceylon on the morning of 4 February 1948, independence day, but it was not sung at the official Freedom Day celebrations. Ceylon continued to use the UK's national anthem as its official national anthem after independence. At the first independence day ceremony held on 4 February 1949 at the Independence Memorial Hall in Torrington Square both "Namo Namo Matha" and "Sri Lanka Matha Pala Yasa Mahima" were sung, in Sinhala and Tamil, as "national songs" by students of Musaeus College girls trained by Fr. Marcelline Jayakody.

More specifically, in 1950 Minister of Finance J. R. Jayewardene requested that the government recognise Samarakoon's "Namo Namo Matha" as the official national anthem. The government appointed a committee headed by Edwin Wijeyeratne, Minister of Home Affairs and Rural Development, to pick a new national anthem. The committee heard several songs but, after much deliberation, picked "Namo Namo Matha". The committee made a minor change to Samarakoon's song, with his approval, changing the tenth line from "Nawajeewana Damine Newatha Apa Awadi Karan Matha" to "Nawa Jeewana Demine Nithina Apa Pubudu Karan Matha". The committee's decision was endorsed by the government on 22 November 1951. The anthem was translated into the Tamil language by M. Nallathamby. "Namo Namo Matha" was first sung as Ceylon's official national anthem at the independence day parade in Colombo in 1952.

In the late 1950s controversy arose over its first line, "Namo Namo Matha, Apa Sri Lanka". It was deemed to be "unlucky" and blamed for the country's misfortunes including the deaths of two prime ministers. In February 1961 the government changed the line to their present form, "Sri Lanka Matha, Apa Sri Lanka", despite Samarakoon's strong opposition. Samarakoon committed suicide in April 1962, leaving a note complaining that its lyrics had been mutilated.

The Second Republican Constitution of 1978 gave "Sri Lanka Matha" constitutional recognition.

== Multilingual ==
The Sri Lankan national anthem is available in an identical version in two languages, Sinhala and Tamil, both official languages of the country. It is just one of a number that are sung in more than one language: Belgium (French, Dutch, and German), Canada (English, French and Inuktitut), Finland (Finnish, Swedish), New Zealand (English and Māori), South Africa (Xhosa, Zulu, Sesotho, Afrikaans and English), Suriname (Dutch and Sranan Tongo) and Switzerland (German, French, Italian and Romansh).

"Sri Lanka Thaaye", the Tamil version of the Sri Lankan national anthem, is an exact translation of "Sri Lanka Matha", the Sinhala version, and has the same music. Although it has existed since independence in 1948 it was generally only sung in the north and east of the country where the Tamil language predominates. The Sinhala version of the Constitution uses Sinhala lyrics while the Tamil version of the constitution uses Tamil lyrics. Per the constitution both Sinhala and Tamil are official and national languages and thus the anthem could be sung in both languages.

The majority of Sri Lankans (around 75%) speak the Sinhala language. More specifically, "Tamil is the native language for the Tamil people, who constitute about 15% of Sri Lankans, and for Muslims who are nearly 10%", according to the BBC. Until early 2016, the Sinhala version was the only one to be used during official government events and it was the only version used during international sports and other events. Although the Sinhala version of the anthem was used at official/state events, the Tamil version was also sung at some events in spite of the unofficial ban which ended in early 2016.

The Sinhala version of Sri Lanka Matha was used in all parts of the country with the exception of the North and the East which have a large Tamil population. Some reports indicate that the Tamil version was used at official events held in the Tamil speaking regions in the North and East of Sri Lanka. The Tamil version was sung at Tamil medium schools throughout the country. The Tamil version was even used during the period when Sinhala was the only official language of the country (1956–87).

=== Tamil version controversy ===
On 12 December 2010 The Sunday Times reported that the Cabinet of Sri Lanka headed by President Mahinda Rajapaksa had taken the decision to scrap the Tamil translation of "Sri Lanka Matha" at official and state functions, as "in no other country was the national anthem used in more than one language" - even though the national anthems of Belgium, Switzerland, Canada and those of several other countries have more than one language version. The Cabinet's decision had followed a paper on the national flag and national anthem produced by Public Administration and Home Affairs Minister W. D. J. Senewiratne. The paper had drawn on the Singaporean model where the national anthem is sung in the official lyrics and not any translation of the lyrics. Based on this the paper recommended that the Sri Lankan national anthem only be sung in Sinhala and the Tamil translation be abolished. The paper's authors had failed to realise that the official lyrics of the Singaporean national anthem are in Malay, a minority language (75% of Singaporeans are Chinese).

Government minister Wimal Weerawansa had labelled the Tamil version a "joke" on Derana TV, and had cited India as an analogy. Some journalists, such as D. B. S. Jeyaraj, claimed that it was wrong of Weerawansa to cite India as an analogy because according to them the Indian national anthem was not in Hindi, which is the most widely spoken language of India, but in Bengali, a minority language. Although sources based on an official Government of India website state that the Indian National anthem was adopted in its Hindi version by the Constituent Assembly of India, the proceedings of the Constituent Assembly of India on 24 January 1950 does not mention that the National Anthem was "adopted", nor does it mention that it was done so in its Hindi version. In actual practice the unaltered Bengali version is the version sung as the National Anthem, with its words in original Bengali Tatsama, a highly Sanskritized form of Bengali that has Sanskrit words common to both Hindi and Bengali.

The Cabinet's December 2010 decision to scrap the Tamil translation of the anthem (which was not subsequently enacted) caused much furore in Sri Lanka. Later, the government denied allegations that the Tamil translation was to be abolished. The Presidential Secretariat has stated that there was no basis to the media report and follow up reports which intimated the same. Nevertheless, an unofficial ban on the Tamil version came into being as fearful public officials in Tamil speaking areas stopped using the Tamil version or blocked attempts to use it. The Sri Lankan Army forcefully stopped any use of the Tamil version and taught school children to sing only the Sinhala version.

In March 2015 newly elected President Maithripala Sirisena announced that he would be issuing a circular which would state that there was no ban on singing the national anthem in Tamil. Sirisena's announcement was attacked by Sinhalese Buddhist nationalists.

During Sri Lanka's 68th national independence day celebrations on 4 February 2016, the Tamil version of the anthem was sung for the first time since 1949 at an official government event, the independence day celebrations. Lifting of the unofficial ban on the Tamil version had been approved by President Maithripala Sirisena (who had said he would unite the nation after the nearly 26-year civil war that ended in 2009) and by others in the government. This step was viewed as part of the plan for "post-civil war ethnic reconciliation".

Naturally, Sri Lanka Matha was also sung in Sinhalese. Some groups, and Sri Lanka's former President Mahinda Rajapaksa, were opposed to the government officially allowing the Tamil version to be sung.

In 2020, the Sri Lankan government stopped using the Tamil version of the national anthem at the main Independence Day celebration. However, regional independence day celebrations including those with government involvement in regions with significant Tamil populations continue to sing in both Tamil and Sinhala.

In 2024, the government once again reinstated the national anthem at the 76th Independence Day.

== Lyrics ==
=== Sinhala version ===
Sinhala original

ශ්‍රී ලංකා මාතා අප ශ්‍රී ලංකා
නමෝ නමෝ නමෝ නමෝ මාතා
සුන්දර සිරිබරිනී
සුරැඳි අති ශෝභමාන ලංකා
ධාන්‍ය ධනය නෙක
මල් පලතුරු පිරි ජය භුමිය රම්‍යා
අප හට සැප සිරි සෙත සදනා
ජීවනයේ මාතා
පිළිගනු මැන අප භක්තී පූජා
නමෝ නමෝ මාතා අප ශ්‍රී ලංකා
නමෝ නමෝ නමෝ නමෝ මාතා

ඔබ වේ අප විද්‍යා
ඔබ මය අප සත්‍යා
ඔබ වේ අප ශක්ති
අප හද තුළ භක්තී
ඔබ අප ආලෝකේ
අපගේ අනුප්‍රාණේ
ඔබ අප ජීවන වේ
අප මුක්තිය ඔබ වේ

නව ජීවන දෙමිනේ
නිතින අප පුබුදු කරන් මාතා
ඥාන වීර්ය වඩවමින රැගෙන
යනු මැන ජය භූමී කරා
එක මවකගෙ දරු කැල බැවිනා
යමු යමු වී නොපමා
ප්‍රේම වඩා සැම භේද දුරැර දා
නමෝ නමෝ මාතා අප ශ්‍රී ලංකා
නමෝ නමෝ නමෝ නමෝ මාතා

Romanisation

Śrī laṅkā mātā, apa Śrī laṅkā
Namō namō namō namō mātā
Sundara siribarinī
Suræn̆di ati śōbhamāna laṅkā
Dhānya dhanaya neka
Mal palaturu piri jaya bhumiya ramyā
Apa haṭa sæpa siri seta sadanā
Jīvanayē mātā
Piḷiganu mæna apa bhaktī pūjā
Namō namō mātā, apa Śrī laṅkā
Namō namō namō namō mātā

Oba vē apa vidyā
Oba maya apa satyā
Oba vē apa śakti
Apa hada tuḷa bhaktī
Oba apa ālōkē
Apagē anuprāṇē
Oba apa jīvana vē
Apa muktiya oba vē

Nava jīvana demine
Nitina apa pubudu karan mātā
Gnāna vīrya vaḍavamina rægena
Yanu mæna jaya bhūmī karā
Eka mavakage daru kæla bævinā
Yamu yamu vī nopamā
Prēma vaḍā sæma bhēda duræra dā
Namō namō mātā, Apa Śrī laṅkā
Namō namō namō namō mātā

IPA transcription (Note: See Help:IPA, Sinhala language § Phonology, Sinhala script § Diacritics and Sinhala script § Letters.)

[sriː laŋ.kaː maː.taː | a.pə sriː laŋ.kaː]
[na.moː na.moː na.moː na.moː maː.taː]
[sun.də.rə si.ri.ba.ri.niː]
[su.ræ.ⁿdi a.ti soː.bə.maː.nə laŋ.kaː]
[dʱaː.njə dʱa.nə.jə ne.kə]
[mal pa.lə.tu.ru pi.ri d͡ʒa.jə bʱu.mi.jə ram.jaː]
[a.pə ha.ʈə sæ.pə si.ri se.tə sa.də.naː]
[d͡ʒiː.ʋə.nə.jeː maː.taː]
[pi.ɭi.ga.nu mæ.nə a.pə bʱak.tiː puː.d͡ʒaː]
[na.moː na.moː maː.taː | a.pə sriː laŋ.kaː]
[na.moː na.moː na.moː na.moː maː.taː]

[o.bə ʋeː a.pə ʋid.jaː]
[o.bə mə.jə a.pə sat.jaː]
[o.bə ʋeː a.pə ʃak.ti]
[a.pə ha.də tu.ɭə bʱak.tiː]
[o.bə a.pə aː.loː.keː]
[a.pə.geː a.nu.praː.neː]
[o.bə a.pə d͡ʒiː.ʋə.nə ʋeː]
[a.pə muk.ti.jə o.bə ʋeː]

[na.ʋə d͡ʒiː.ʋə.nə de.mi.ne]
[ni.ti.nə a.pə pu.bu.du kə.ran maː.taː]
[gnaː.nə ʋiːr.jə ʋa.ɖə.ʋə.mi.nə ræ.ge.nə]
[ja.nu mæ.nə d͡ʒa.jə bʱuː.miː ka.raː]
[e.kə ma.ʋə.kə.ge da.ru kæ.lə bæ.ʋi.naː]
[ja.mu ja.mu ʋiː no.pə.maː]
[preː.mə ʋa.ɖaː sæ.mə bʱeː.də du.ræ.rə daː]
[na.moː na.moː maː.taː | a.pə sriː laŋ.kaː
[na.moː na.moː na.moː na.moː maː.taː]

=== Tamil version ===
Tamil original

சிறீ லங்கா தாயே – நம் சிறீ லங்கா
நமோ நமோ நமோ நமோ தாயே
நல்லெழில் பொலி சீரணி
நலங்கள் யாவும் நிறை வான்மணி லங்கா
ஞாலம் புகழ் வள வயல் நதி மலை மலர்
நறுஞ்சோலை கொள் லங்கா
நமதுறு புகலிடம் என ஒளிர்வாய்
நமதுதி ஏல் தாயே
நம தலை நினதடி மேல் வைத்தோமே
நமதுயிரே தாயே – நம் சிறீ லங்கா
நமோ நமோ நமோ நமோ தாயே

நமதாரருள் ஆனாய்
நவை தவிர் உணர்வானாய்
நமதேர் வலியானாய்
நவில் சுதந்திரம் ஆனாய்
நமதிளமையை நாட்டே
நகு மடி தனையோட்டே
அமைவுறும் அறிவுடனே
அடல் செறி துணிவருளே

நமதார் ஒளி வளமே
நறிய மலர் என நிலவும் தாயே
யாமெலாம் ஒரு கருணை அனைபயந்த
எழில்கொள் சேய்கள் எனவே
இயலுறு பிளவுகள் தமை அறவே
இழிவென நீக்கிடுவோம்
ஈழ சிரோமணி வாழ்வுறு பூமணி
நமோ நமோ தாயே – நம் சிறீ லங்கா
நமோ நமோ நமோ நமோ தாயே

Romanisation

Srī laṅkā tāyē – nam Srī laṅkā
Namō namō namō namō tāyē
Nalleḻil poli cīraṇi
Nalaṅkaḷ yāvum niṟai vāṉmaṇi laṅkā
Ñālam pukaḻ vaḷa vayal nati malai malar
Naṟuñcōlai koḷ laṅkā
Namatuṟu pukaliṭam eṉa oḷirvāy
Namatuti ēl tāyē
Namatalai niṉataṭi mēl vaittōmē
Namatuyirē tāyē – nam Srī laṅkā
Namō namō namō namō tāyē

Namatāraruḷ āṉāy
Navai tavir uṇarvāṉāy
Namatere valiyāṉāy
Navil cutantiram āṉāy
Namatiḷamaiyai nāṭṭē
Naku maṭi taṉaiyōṭṭē
Amaivuṟum aṟivuṭaṉē
Aṭalceṟi tuṇivaruḷē

Namatōr oḷi vaḷamē
Naṟiya malar eṉa nilavum tāyē
Yāmellām oru karuṇai aṉaipayanta
Eḻilkoḷ cēykaḷ eṉavē
Iyaluṟu piḷavukaḷ tamai aṟavē
Iḻiveṉa nīkkiṭuvōm
Īḻa cirōmaṇi vāḻvuṟu pūmaṇi
Namō namō tāyē – nam Srī laṅkā
Namō namō namō namō tāyē

IPA transcription (Note: See Help:IPA/Tamil, Tamil phonology and Tamil script § Letters.)

/ɕɾiː ləŋ.gaː taː.jeː | nəm ɕɾiː ləŋ.gaː/
/nə.moː nə.moː nə.moː nə.moː taː.jeː/
/nəl.le.ɻil po.li siː.ɾə.ɳi/
/nə.ləŋ.gəɭ jaː.ʋum ni.rəɪ ʋaːn.mə.ɳi ləŋ.gaː/
/ɲaː.ləm pu.kəɻ ʋə.ɭə ʋə.jəl nə.di mə.ləɪ mə.ləɾ/
/nə.ruɲ.t͡ʃoː.ləɪ koɭ ləŋ.gaː/
/nə.mə.du.ru pu.gə.li.ɖəm e.nə o.ɭiɾ.ʋaːj/
/nə.mə.du.di eːl taː.jeː/
/nə.mə.də.ləɪ ni.nə.də.ɖi meːl ʋəɪt.toː.meː/
/nə.mə.du.ji.ɾeː taː.jeː | nəm ɕɾiː ləŋ.gaː/
/nə.moː nə.moː nə.moː nə.moː taː.jeː/

/nə.mə.daː.ɾə.ɾuɭ aː.naːj/
/nə.ʋəɪ tə.ʋiɾ u.ɳəɾ.ʋaː.naːj/
/nə.mə.de.ɾe ʋə.li.jaː.naːj/
/nə.ʋil su.dən.di.ɾəm aː.naːj/
/nə.mə.di.ɭə.məɪ.jəɪ naːɖ.ɖeː/
/nə.gu mə.ɖi tə.nəɪ.joːɖ.ɖeː/
/ə.məɪ.ʋu.rum ə.ri.ʋu.ɖə.neː/
/ə.ɖəl.t͡ʃe.ri tu.ɳi.ʋə.ɾu.ɭeː/

/nə.mə.doːɾ o.ɭi ʋə.ɭə.meː/
/nə.ri.jə mə.ləɾ e.nə ni.lə.ʋum taː.jeː/
/jaː.mel.laːm o.ɾu kə.ɾu.ɳəɪ a.nəɪ.bə.jən.də/
/e.ɻil.goɭ seːj.gəɭ e.nə.ʋeː/
/i.jə.lu.ru pi.ɭə.ʋu.gəɭ tə.məɪ ə.rə.ʋeː/
/i.ɻi.ʋe.nə niːk.ki.ɖu.ʋoːm/
/iː.ɻə si.ɾoː.mə.ɳi ʋaːɻ.ʋu.ru puː.mə.ɳi/
/nə.moː nə.moː taː.jeː | nəm ɕɾiː ləŋ.gaː/
/nə.moː nə.moː nə.moː nə.moː taː.jeː/

=== Poetic English translation ===
Thou Mother Lanka,
Oh Mother Lanka we salute, salute, salute, salute Thee!
Plenteous in prosperity, Thou,
Beauteous in grace and love,
Laden with grain and luscious fruit,
And fragrant flowers of radiant hue,
Giver of life and all good things,
Our land of joy and victory,
Receive our grateful praise sublime, we worship, worship Thee.
Oh Mother Lanka! We salute, salute, salute, salute Thee!

Thou gavest us Knowledge and Truth,
Thou art our strength and inward faith,
Our light divine and sentient being,
Breath of life and liberation.
Grant us, bondage free, inspiration.
Inspire us for ever.

In wisdom and strength renewed,
Ill-will, hatred, strife all ended,
In love enfolded, a mighty nation
Marching onward, all of us as Children of One Mother,
Lead us, Mother, to fullest freedom, we worship, worship Thee
Oh Mother Lanka! We salute, salute, salute, salute Thee!

== See also ==
- National symbols of Sri Lanka
- List of national anthems
