= P. B. Illangasinghe =

Sri Lankan astrologist (1888–1960)

P. B. Elangasinha Rate Mahatmaya
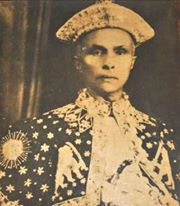
- Born: Punchi Banda Elangasinha; 6 April 1888; Pahala Walluwa, Illawathura, Gampola, Sri Lanka
- Died: 22 September 1960 (aged 72)
- Occupation: Notary public

Punchi Banda Elangasinha, Rate Mahatmaya (Sinhala: පුංචි බණ්ඩා ඉලන්ගසිංහ; 6 April 1888 – 22 September 1960) was a Sri Lankan notary public, traditional eye doctor, astrologist and musicologist. He is best known for writing the anthems of Dharmaraja College, Hillwood College, and Rahula College as well as the first national anthem of Sri Lanka (then Ceylon), “Sri Lanka Matha Pala Yasa Mahima Jaya Jaya” in collaboration with Lionel Edirisinghe

== Biography ==
P. B. Elangasinha was born on 6 April 1888 in Illawathura, Gampola and received his primary education at the Buddhist Mixed School, Gampola, and St. Thomas College, Mathara. He went to St. Thomas Teachers Training School before being appointed as the headmaster of Waebada Buddhist School. He pioneered and served as the president of "Samastha Lanka As Weda Sangamaya‟ (All Island Society of Traditional Eye Doctors) and "Samastha Lanka Sarpa Visha Veda Sangamaya‟ (All Island Society of Traditional Venom Doctors). Students were trained at his home to perform Buddhist Carols composed by him for annual Buddhist ceremonies. He served as a music director and a music exam inspector of "Jathika Gandharwa Sabha‟ (National Association of Musicians). He was also a member of the Ceylon branch of the Royal Asiatic Society of Great Britain and Ireland.

Elangasinha was selected to be a part of Lanka Gandharva Sabha's judging panel, along with SLB Kapukotuwa, Dr. OHD Wijesekera, Lionel Edirisinghe, Mudliyar EA Abeysekera and LLK Gunatunga to determine the country's national anthem. In a controversial decision, the song written by P. B. Elangasinha and set to music by Lionel Edirisinghe was announced to be the new national anthem. The fact that a song submitted by two members of the selection panel had “won” the national song competition evoked widespread resentment and protests. It was seen as blatantly unfair. Although the song by the Elangasinha-Edirisinghe duo was broadcast over the then “Radio Ceylon” on the morning of Independence day as the national song it was not sung at the official Freedom Day ceremony due to protests. While the song itself was flawless and above reproach, it was the perception of favoritism in the decision to adopt it that fueled criticism and protests. Thus the song which won the national song competition in this manner was unacceptable as far as the people were concerned.

Elangasinha's service to his motherland earned him the honorary title "Rate Mahatmaya‟.
