= National symbols of Spain =

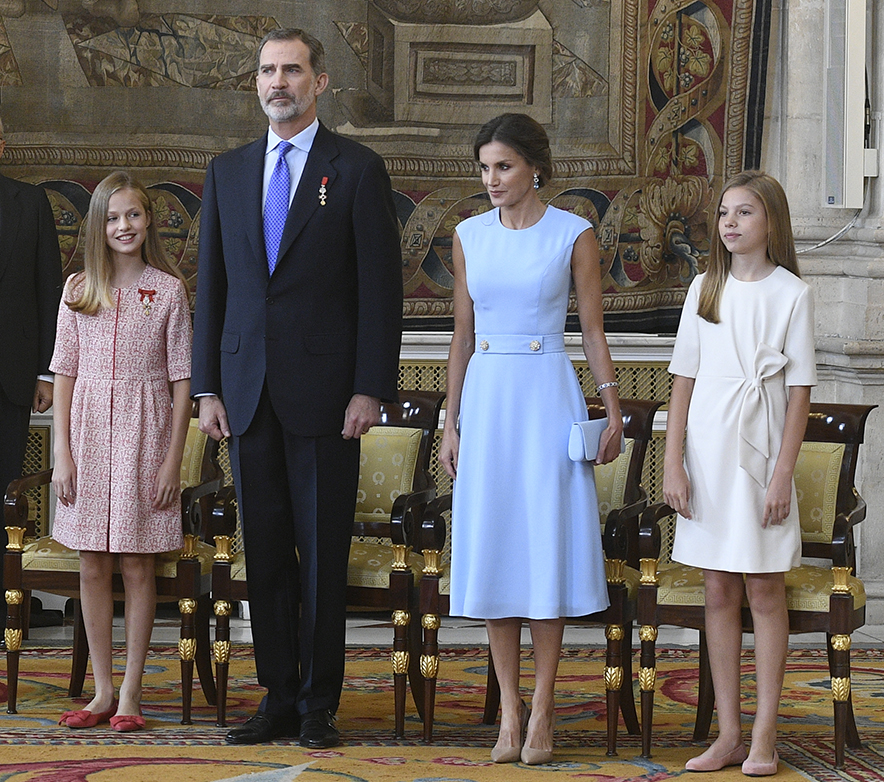
The Monarch is the head of state, symbol of its unity and permanence.

According to what is stipulated in the Spanish Constitution, the Kingdom of Spain has three symbols: The Spanish national flag, the coat of arms and the national anthem. Unofficially, there are also additional traditional symbols. The national personification, Hispania, is little used nowadays although it is present in different artistic expressions. The traditional symbolic animals of Spain are the fighting bull and the imperial eagle.

The National Day of Spain (Spanish: Fiesta Nacional de España) is a national holiday held annually on 12 October. It is also traditionally and commonly referred to as the Día de la Hispanidad (Hispanicity, Spanishness Day), commemorating Spanish legacy worldwide, especially in Hispanic America.

== Religious symbols ==
The patron saint of Spain is Our Lady of the Immaculate Conception, but Saint James the Apostle and Our Lady of the Pillar are highly revered religious figures in Spain, and are considered patrons of different regions and groups.

Saint James the Apostle has been the patron saint of Spain since the 9th century, and his feast day is celebrated on July 25th. Our Lady of the Pillar is the patron saint of "Hispanidad" and her feast day is celebrated on October 12th. She is also the patron saint of Zaragoza and the Civil Guard.

Our Lady of the Immaculate Conception was declared patron saint of Spain in 1644, and her feast day is celebrated on December 8.

== Kingdom of Spain ==
Name and flag	National personification	National animals	National flower	Coat of arms	Motto	Anthem
Flag of Spain	Hispania	Spanish Fighting Bull (Unofficial)	Carnation	Coat of arms of Spain	Plus Ultra (Latin) "Further beyond"	"Marcha Real" (Royal March) Note: It is one of only four national anthems in the world that have no official lyrics

== See also ==
- Spain
- Coat of arms of Spain
- Flag of Spain
- Marcha Real
- Monarchy of Spain
- Constitution of Spain
