= Ananda Samarakoon =

Sri Lankan musician (1911–1962)

- Born: Egodahage George Wilfred Alwis Samarakoon; 13 January 1911
- Died: 5 April 1962 (aged 51)
- Education: Visva-Bharati University
- Occupations: Singer-songwriter; Lecturer
- Musical career
- Origin: Sri Lanka
- Genre: Sri Lankan music
- Occupations: Singer-songwriter; Lecturer
- Years active: 1938–1962

Egodahage George Wilfred Alwis Samarakoon (13 January 1911 – 2 April 1962), known as Ananda Samarakoon, was a Sri Lankan (Sinhalese) composer and musician. He composed the Sri Lankan national anthem "Namo Namo Matha" and is considered the father of artistic Sinhala music and founder of the modern Sri Lankan Sinhala Geeta Sahitya (Song Literature).

== Early life and education ==
Born on 13 January 1911 as Egodahage George Wilfred Alwis Samarakoon, to Samuel Samarakoon, Chief Clerk to British-owned Maturata Plantations and Dominga Peries in Watareka, Padukka. He was the second of four sons in a Christian family. Samarakoon received his primary education at Wewala School and thereafter attended CMS Sri Jayawardenepura College (Christian College, Kotte). His Sinhala Guru was Pandit D.C.P. Gamalathge. Later he served his Alma mater as a teacher of Music and Art. Samarakoon left for the Visva-Bharati University, Santiniketan in India to study art and music. After six months he abandoned his studies and returned to Ceylon, and changed his name to Ananda Samarakoon, embracing Buddhism. Then he served as the music teacher of Mahinda College, Galle from 1938 to 1942.

== Career ==
=== Composer ===
In 1937, the popular music of Sri Lanka consisted of songs derived from the North Indian Ragadhari music. These songs lyrics often contained meaningless phrases with little or no literary merit. Samarakoon set out to create a form of a music that can be classified as Sri Lanka's own and came out with the song Ennada Menike (එන්නද මැණිකේ) (1940) that paved the foundation for the artistic Sinhala music. In 1940, he composed Namo Namo Mata (නමෝ නමෝ මාතා) to inspire patriotism and love for the country among his students at Mahinda College. The song was first performed by young students of Mahinda College at the prestigious Olcott Hall, and it was later selected by the Sri Lankan government as the nation’s official anthem.

The love themed song Endada Menike (එන්නද මැණිකේ) unfolds in the form of a dialogue between a young village boy and a girl. Poetic and beautifully rustic, it became a success and Samarakoon followed it with a string of successful songs in the early to mid-1940s, the period considered his golden age. Among his best known works are:

- Podimal Etano (පොඩිමල් එතනෝ)
- Vilay Malak Pipila (විලේ මලක් පිපීලා)
- Poson Pohoda (පොසොන් පොහෝදා)
- Asay madura (ඇසේ මදුර)
- Sunila Guvanay (සුනිල ගුවනේ)
- Punchi Suda (පුංචි සුදා)
- Nilvala Gangay (නිල්වලා ගඟේ)
- Sumano (සුමනෝ)
- Pudamu Kusum (පුදමු කුසුම්)
- Siri Saru Saara Ketay (සිරි සරු සාර කෙතේ)

=== Painter ===
In 1945, Samarakoon's only son died at the age of five, and the grieving Samarakoon left Sri Lanka for India where he pursued a painting career and held eleven art exhibitions there. Though his painting were critically acclaimed, he returned to music in 1951 back in Sri Lanka.

=== National anthem ===
One of Samarakoon's early compositions, Namo Namo Mata was nominated as the national anthem and was officially adopted as the national anthem of Ceylon on 22 November 1951 by a committee headed by Sir Edwin Wijeyeratne. The song faced criticism, particularly regarding the "Gana" significance of its opening words (Namo Namo Mata), which some claimed brought disease and ill fortune to the country’s political leaders. Having completed advanced studies in Ghana Shastra in India, Samarakoon firmly stated that he was the only one qualified to judge any errors in the lyrics. Despite this, a few days later he was summoned to the Sri Lanka Broadcasting Corporation, where he was made to listen to a version of his song that had been altered without his knowledge or consent.

=== Death ===
On 5 April 1962, at the age of 51, Samarakoon took his own life by overdosing on sleeping tablets. His suicide is widely believed to have been influenced by the unauthorized alterations made to his composition of the national anthem, Namo Namo Mata.Which was changed without permission to “Sri Lanka Mata”
