= Sirima–Gandhi Pact =

1974 treaty between Sri Lanka and India

Sirima-Gandhi Pact, 1974

The Sirima–Gandhi Pact or Srimavo-Gandhi Pact was an agreement that was signed between Sirimavo Bandaranaike, the Prime Minister of Sri Lanka, and Indira Gandhi, the Prime Minister of India, on 28 June 1974. It was a follow-up agreement of Sirima-Shastri Pact that left 150,000 people of Indian origin in Sri Lanka to future account. Sirima-Shastri Pact agreed to grant Ceylonese citizenship to 300,000 Indian population in Sri Lanka and 525,000 people repatriation to India.

The pact is considered one of the good relationship factors between India and Sri Lanka since it contributed to solve the issues of stateless Indian origin people in Sri Lanka.

== See also ==
- Nehru-Kotelawala Pact
- Bandaranaike–Chelvanayakam Pact
- Ceylon Citizenship Act
