= Nehru-Kotelawala Pact =

Nehru-Kotelawala Pact, 1954

The Nehru-Kotelawala Pact was an agreement that was signed between Jawaharlal Nehru, the Prime Minister of India, and John Kotelawala, the Prime Minister of Sri Lanka, on 18 January 1954. It was an agreement in regarding to the status and future of people of Indian origin in Ceylon. They were brought by British from Madras Presidency in British India to work in tea, coffee and coconut plantations of British Ceylon.

In the pact, India accepted in principle the repatriation of Indian population in Ceylon. But Jawaharlal Nehru only supported voluntary repatriation of those who voluntary accepted Indian citizenship. India disagreed on Sri Lankan position that suggested granting Indian citizenship to people, who failed to qualify for Sri Lankan citizenship.

== See also ==
- Ceylon Citizenship Act, 1948
- Bandaranaike–Chelvanayakam Pact, 1957
- Sirima-Shastri Pact, 1964
- Sirima-Gandhi Pact, 1974
