= Sirimavo Bandaranaike =

Prime Minister of Sri Lanka (1916–2000)

The Honourable Sirimavo Bandaranaike
- සිරිමාවෝ බණ්ඩාරනායක சிறிமாவோ பண்டாரநாயக்கே
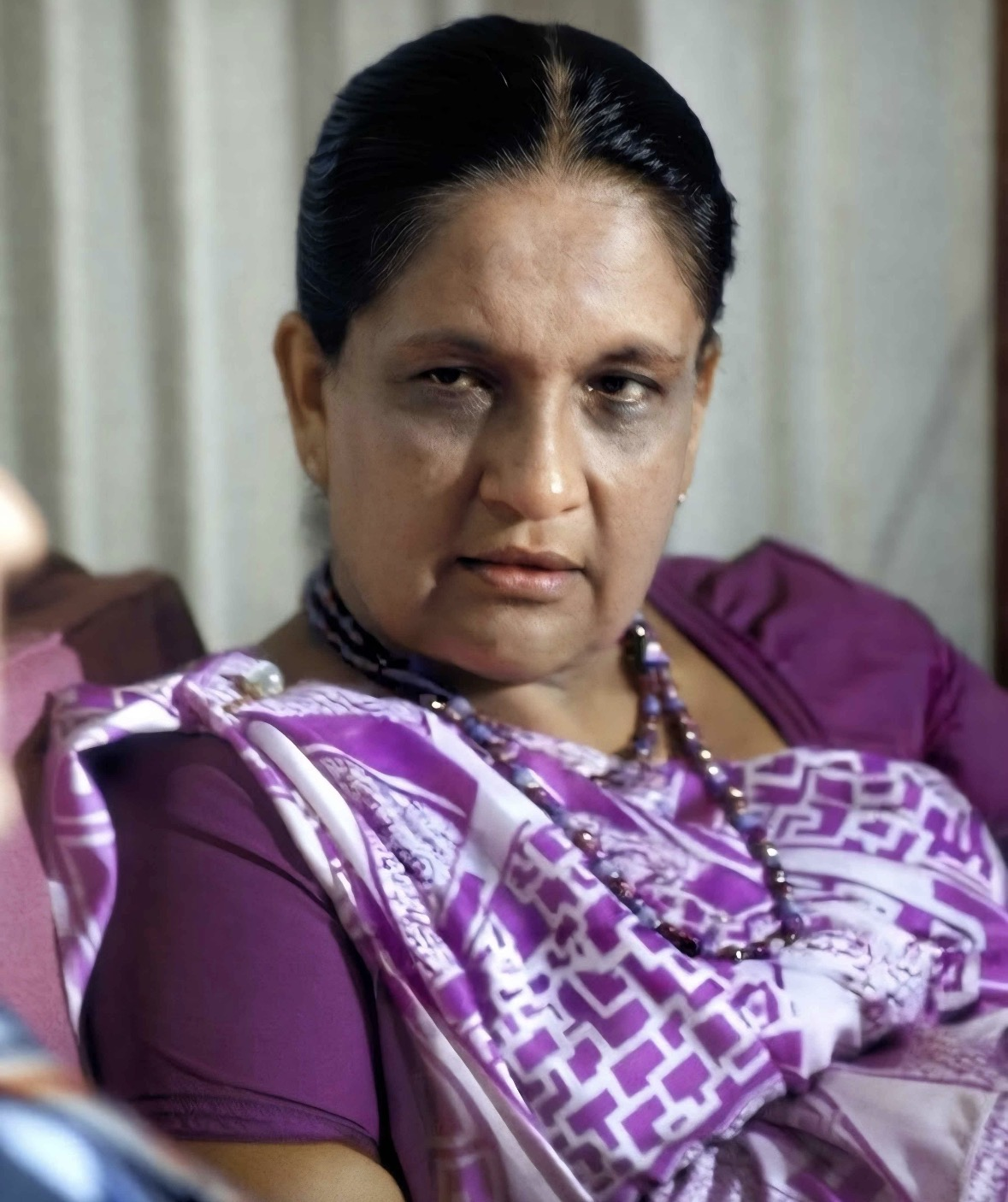
- Sirimavo Bandaranaike in 1974

Prime Minister of Sri Lanka
- In office 14 November 1994 – 10 August 2000
- President: Chandrika Kumaratunga
- Preceded by: Chandrika Kumaratunga
- Succeeded by: Ratnasiri Wickremanayake
- In office 29 May 1970 – 23 July 1977
- Monarch: Elizabeth II (1970–1972)
- President: William Gopallawa (1972–1977)
- Governor General: William Gopallawa (1970–1972)
- Preceded by: Dudley Senanayake
- Succeeded by: J. R. Jayewardene
- In office 21 July 1960 – 27 March 1965
- Monarch: Elizabeth II
- Governors General: Oliver Goonetilleke; William Gopallawa
- Preceded by: Dudley Senanayake
- Succeeded by: Dudley Senanayake

Leader of the Opposition
- In office 9 March 1989 – 24 June 1994
- Prime Minister: Dingiri Banda Wijetunga; Ranil Wickremesinghe
- Preceded by: Anura Bandaranaike
- Succeeded by: Gamini Dissanayake
- In office 5 April 1965 – 25 March 1970
- Prime Minister: Dudley Senanayake
- Preceded by: Dudley Senanayake
- Succeeded by: J. R. Jayewardene

Chair of the Sri Lanka Freedom Party
- In office 7 May 1960 – 12 November 1994
- Preceded by: C. P. de Silva
- Succeeded by: Chandrika Kumaratunga
Parliamentary roles
Member of Parliament
In office 15 February 1989 – 10 August 2000
Constituency	Gampaha (1989–1994); National list (1994–2000)
In office 5 April 1965 – 16 October 1980
Preceded by	James Obeysekera
Succeeded by	Lakshman Jayakody
Constituency	Attanagalla
Member of the Senate
In office 2 August 1960 – 4 December 1964
Preceded by	Piyadasa de Zoysa
Succeeded by	Unknown

Personal details
- Born: Sirima Ratwatte; 17 April 1916 Ratnapura, British Ceylon
- Died: 10 October 2000 (aged 84) Kadawatha, Sri Lanka
- Resting place: Horagolla Bandaranaike Samadhi
- Party: SLFP
- Spouse: Solomon Bandaranaike (m. 1940; died 1959)
- Children: Sunethra; Chandrika; Anura
- Parent: Barnes Ratwatte (father)
- Relatives: Bandaranaike family
- Education: St. Bridget's Convent, Colombo
- Occupation: Politician; diplomat; stateswoman
- Awards: See below
- Website: Bandaranaike net
- Nickname: "Mathini"

Sirima Ratwatte Dias Bandaranaike (Note: Pronounced /ˌbændərəˈnɑːɪɪkə/; Tamil: சிறிமா ரத்வத்தே டயஸ் பண்டாரநாயக்கே; Sinhala: සිරිමා රත්වත්තේ ඩයස් බණ්ඩාරනායක) (née Ratwatte; 17 April 1916 – 10 October 2000), commonly known as Sirimavo Bandaranaike, (Note: The suffix "vo" denotes respect. Bandaranaike was also referred to as Mrs Bandaranaike, Mrs B, or Mathini.) was a Sri Lankan stateswoman who thrice served as Prime Minister of Sri Lanka (Note: Sri Lanka was known as Ceylon during her first premiership from 1960 to 1965 and briefly during her second premiership from 1970 until it was changed in 1972.) from 1960 to 1965, from 1970 to 1977, and from 1994 to 2000. She was the first woman in the world to be democratically elected prime minister in 1960. A chairperson of the Sri Lanka Freedom Party (SLFP) from 1960 to 1994, she pursued socialist economic policies and promoted Sinhalese Buddhist nationalism. Bandaranaike was a founding member of the Non-Aligned Movement (NAM) and later served as chairperson of the organisation from 1976 to 1977, becoming the first woman to lead the organisation.

Born into a Sinhalese Kandyan aristocratic family, Bandaranaike was educated in Anglican, English-medium schools, but remained a Buddhist, and spoke Sinhala as well as English. As a hostess for her husband S. W. R. D. Bandaranaike, who founded the socialist SLFP in 1951 and became prime minister in 1956, she became an informal advisor, and focused on improving the lives of women and girls in rural areas. Following her husband's assassination in 1959, she was persuaded to succeed her late husband as chairwoman, and returned her party to government in the July 1960 election. Her opponents dubbed her as the "Weeping Widow". As a result of her election victory, the British press coined the term "stateswoman" as they could not use "statesman". She was then unseated by Senanayake in the 1965 election and became Leader of the Opposition, before winning a large majority in 1970.

Bandaranaike attempted to reform the former Dominion of Ceylon into a socialist republic by nationalising organisations in the banking, education, industry, media and trade sectors. Changing the administrative language from English to Sinhala and routinely campaigning on Sinhalese nationalist and anti-Tamil policies exacerbated discontent among the native Tamil population. During Bandaranaike's first two terms as prime minister, Sri Lanka experienced high unemployment, inflation and economic difficulties. Her governments nevertheless pursued a significant social, development and foreign policy. Surviving an attempted coup d'état in 1962, as well as a 1971 insurrection of radical youths, in 1972 she oversaw the drafting of a new constitution and the formation of the Sri Lankan republic, separating it from the British Empire. In 1975, Bandaranaike created what would eventually become the Sri Lankan Ministry of Women and Child Affairs, and played a large role abroad as a negotiator and a leader among the Non-Aligned Nations. After losing against J. R. Jayewardene in a landslide in the 1977 election, he stripped her of her civic rights in 1980 and later restored them in 1986. The new government initially improved the domestic economy, but failed to address social issues, and led the country into a protracted civil war against Tamil militants, which escalated in brutality, especially when the Indian Peace Keeping Force intervened. Bandaranaike opposed the Indian intervention, believing it violated Sri Lankan sovereignty.

Failing to win the office of president against new UNP leader Ranasinghe Premadasa in 1988, she restored her party, which had by now developed more centrist policies and advocated for a reconciliatory approach towards Tamils in the civil war, as a relevant force in the first parliamentary election after 12 years and served a second time as Leader of the Opposition from 1989 to 1994. When her daughter Chandrika Kumaratunga, who succeeded her as party leader, became prime minister and went on to win the 1994 presidential election, Bandaranaike was appointed to her third term as prime minister. At the time of her third term, she was the world's oldest serving premier and served until her retirement in 2000, two months prior to her death. She was the longest-serving prime minister in Sri Lankan history.

== Early life (1916–1940) ==
The Mahawalatenne family, including Mahawalatenne Rate Mahattaya (back row right) and Agnes Mahawalatenne (née Ellawala, front row right), the maternal grandparents of Sirima Ratwatte.

Bandaranaike was born Sirima Ratwatte on 17 April 1916 at Ellawala Walawwa, her aunt's residence in Ratnapura, in British Ceylon. Her mother was Rosalind Hilda Mahawalatenne Kumarihamy, an informal Ayurvedic physician, and her father was Barnes Ratwatte, a native headman and politician. Her maternal grandfather Mahawalatenne, and later her father, served as Rate Mahatmaya, a native headman, of Balangoda. Her father was a member of the Radala Ratwatte family, chieftains of the Kingdom of Kandy. Her paternal ancestry included her uncle Sir Jayatilaka Cudah Ratwatte, the first person from Kandy to receive a British knighthood, as well as courtiers serving Sinhalese monarchs. One of these, Ratwatte, Dissawa of Matale, was a signatory of the 1815 Kandyan Convention.

According to biographical accounts, a herd of elephants entered the enclosure at the time of Bandaranaike's birth, an occurrence that was regarded as an auspicious sign. Astrologer Hetuwa Gurunanse, was subsequently consulted to prepare her horoscope and reportedly predicted that she would one day become Queen of the country.

Sirima was the eldest. She had four brothers, Barnes Jr., Seevali, Mackie, and Clifford, and one sister, Patricia, who married Colonel Edward James Divitotawela, founder of the Central Command of the Ceylon Army. The family resided at the walawwa, or colonial manor house, of Sirima's maternal grandfather Mahawalatenne, and then later at their own walawwa in Balangoda. From a young age, Sirima had access to her grandfather's vast library of literary and scientific works. She first attended a private kindergarten in Balangoda, moved briefly in 1923 to the primary classes of Ferguson High School in Ratnapura, and was then sent to boarding school at St Bridget's Convent, Colombo. Though her education was in the Anglican school system, Sirima remained a practising Buddhist throughout her life and was fluent in both English and Sinhala.

After completing her schooling at age 19, Sirima Ratwatte became involved in social work, distributing food and medicine to jungle villages, organising clinics and helping create rural industry to improve the living standards of village women. She became the treasurer of the Social Service League, serving in that capacity until 1940. Over the next six years, she lived with her parents while they arranged her marriage. After rejecting two suitors – a relative, and the son of the first family of Ceylon – Ratwatte's parents were contacted by a matchmaker who proposed a union with Solomon West Ridgeway Dias (S.W.R.D.) Bandaranaike, an Oxford-educated lawyer-turned-politician, who was at the time Minister of Local Administration in the State Council of Ceylon. Initially, S.W.R.D. Bandaranaike was not considered to be from an "acceptable" family, but ultimately approval was given by the Ratwatte family. The couple, who had previously met, were in agreement with the choice.

== Raising a family, social work (1940–1959) ==
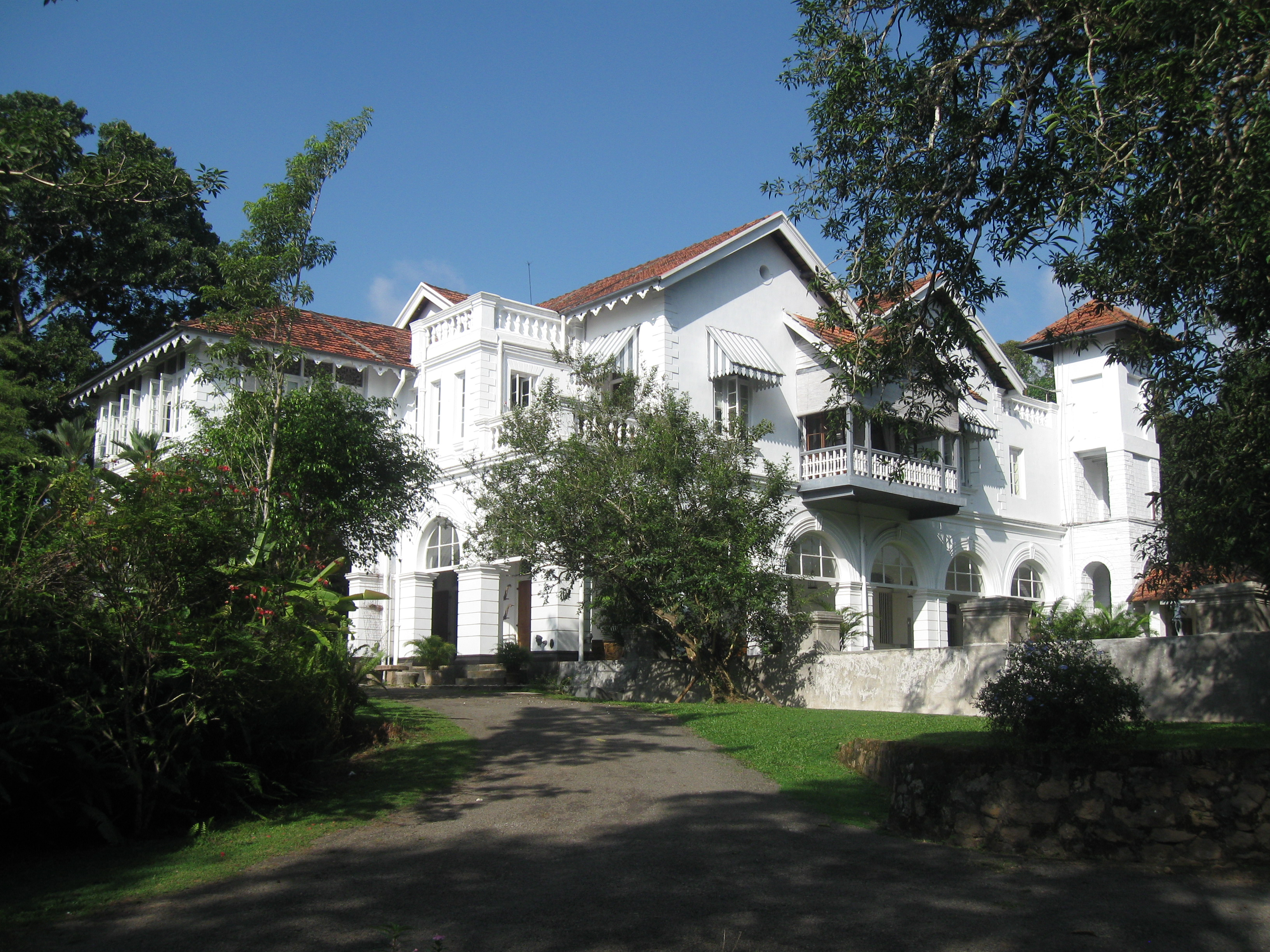
Horagolla Walawwa, the Bandaranaike ancestral manor

On 2 October 1940, Ratwatte and Bandaranaike married at the Mahawelatenne Walawwa in what was dubbed "the wedding of the century" by the press for its grandeur. The newly married couple moved into Wendtworth in Colombo's Guildford Crescent, which they rented from Lionel Wendt. Their daughters, Sunethra (1943) and Chandrika (1945), were born at Wendtworth where the family lived until 1946, when S.W.R.D.'s father bought them a mansion known as Tintagel at Rosmead Place in Colombo.

From this point onward, the family lived part of the year at Tintagel and part of the year at S.W.R.D.'s ancestral manor, Horagolla Walawwa. A son, Anura was born at Tintagel in 1949. Over the next 20 years, Sirima Bandaranaike devoted most of her time to raising her family and playing hostess to her husband's many political acquaintances. All three of Bandaranaike's children were educated abroad, and all would later return and serve in the Sri Lankan government.

In 1941 Bandaranaike joined the Lanka Mahila Samiti (Lankan Women's Association), the country's largest women's voluntary organisation. She participated in many of the social projects initiated by the Mahila Samiti for the empowerment of rural women and disaster relief. One of her first projects was an agricultural programme to meet food production shortages. Her first office, as secretary of the organisation, involved meeting with farming experts to develop new methods for producing yields of rice crops. Over time, Bandaranaike served as the treasurer, vice-president, and eventually president of Mahila Samiti, focusing on issues of girls' education, women's political rights, and family planning. She was also a member of the All Ceylon Buddhist Women's Association, the Cancer Society, the Ceylon National Association for the Prevention of Tuberculosis, and the Nurses Welfare Association.

Bandaranaike often accompanied S.W.R.D. on official trips, both locally and abroad. She and her husband were both present after the psychiatric hospital in Angoda was bombed by the Japanese during the Easter Sunday Raid in 1942, killing many. As Ceylon moved toward self-governing status in 1947, S.W.R.D. became more active in the nationalist movement. He ran for – and was elected to – the House of Representatives from the Attanagalla Electoral District. He was appointed Minister of Health and served as Leader of the House, but became increasingly frustrated with the inner workings and policies of the United National Party. Though he did not encourage Bandaranaike to engage on political topics and was dismissive of her in front of colleagues, S.W.R.D. came to respect her judgment.

In 1951, she persuaded him to resign from the United National Party and establish the Sri Lanka Freedom Party (Freedom Party, aka SLFP). Bandaranaike campaigned in S.W.R.D.'s Attanagalla constituency during the 1952 parliamentary election, while he travelled around the country to garner support. Though the Freedom Party won only nine seats during that election, S.W.R.D. was elected to Parliament and became Leader of the Opposition.

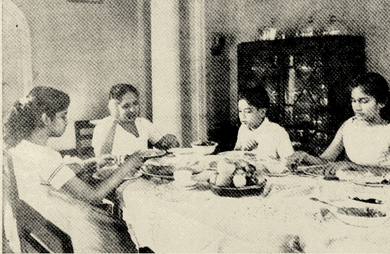
Bandaranaike, with her children Sunethra, Chandrika, and Anura

When fresh elections were called in 1956 by Prime Minister Sir John Kotelawala, S.W.R.D. sensed an opportunity and formed the Mahajana Eksath Peramuna (MEP), a broad four-party coalition, to contest the 1956 elections. Bandaranaike once again campaigned for her husband in Attanagalla, in her home town of Balangoda, and in Ratnapura for the Freedom Party. The Mahajana Eksath Peramuna won a landslide victory and S.W.R.D. became the prime minister.

While on a state visit to Malaysia on its Independence in 1957, the couple had to cut short their stay when they received news that Bandaranaike's father was gravely ill following a heart attack. He died two weeks after their hasty return.

Bandaranaike was at home in Rosmead Place on the morning of 25 September 1959, when her husband was shot multiple times by a Buddhist monk, disgruntled over what he believed to be lack of support for traditional medicine. Bandaranaike accompanied her husband to hospital, where he succumbed to his wounds the following day.

In the political chaos that followed under the caretaker government of Wijeyananda Dahanayake, many cabinet ministers were removed, and some were arrested and tried for the assassination. The Mahajana Eksath Peramuna coalition collapsed without S.W.R.D.'s influence, and elections were called for March 1960 to fill the seat for the Attanagalla constituency. Bandaranaike reluctantly agreed to run as an independent candidate, but before the election could be held, Parliament was dissolved, and she decided not to contest the seat. When the election was held in March 1960, the United National Party won a four-seat majority over the Sri Lanka Freedom Party. Dudley Senanayake, the new prime minister, was defeated within a month in a vote of confidence and a second general election was called for July 1960.

== Party leadership ==
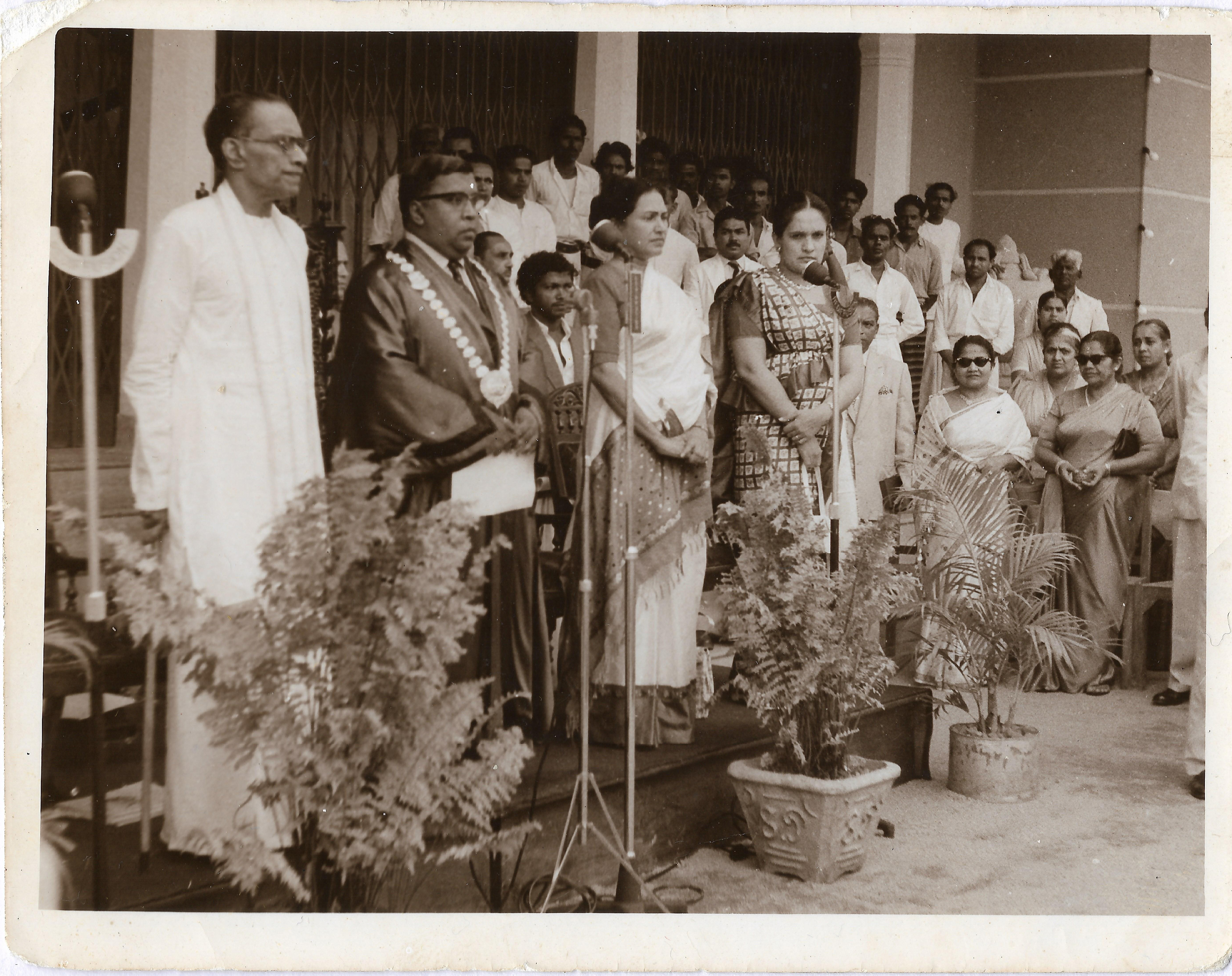
Bandaranaike with her husband two days before his assassination in September 1959

In May 1960, Bandaranaike was unanimously elected party president by the executive committee of the Freedom Party, although at the time she was still undecided about running in the July election. Disavowing former party ties with Communists and Trotskyists, by early June she was campaigning with promises to carry forward the policies of her husband – in particular, establishing a republic, enacting a law to establish Sinhala as the official language of the country, and recognising the predominance of Buddhism, though tolerating the estate Tamils' use of their own language and Hindu faith.

Though there had been Tamil populations in the country for centuries, the majority of the estate Tamils had been brought to Ceylon from India by the British authorities as plantation workers. Many Ceylonese viewed them as temporary immigrants, even though they had lived for generations in Ceylon. With Ceylon's independence, the Citizenship Act of 1948 excluded these Indian Tamils from citizenship, making them stateless. S.W.R.D.'s policy toward the stateless Tamils had been moderate, granting some citizenship and allowing productive workers to remain. His successor, Dudley Senanayake, was the first to recommend compulsory repatriation for the population. Bandaranaike toured the country and made emotional speeches, frequently bursting into tears as she pledged herself to continue her late husband's policies. Her actions earned her the title "The Weeping Widow" from her opponents.

== Political career (1960–2000) ==
=== First Premiership (1960–1965) ===
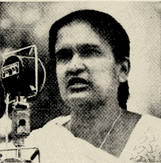
Bandaranaike in 1961

On 21 July 1960, following a landslide victory for the Freedom Party, Bandaranaike was sworn in as the first female prime minister in the world, as well as Minister of Defence and External Affairs. As she was not an elected member of parliament at the time, but leader of the party holding the majority in parliament, the constitution required her to become a member of Parliament within three months if she was to continue holding office as prime minister. To make a place for her, Manameldura Piyadasa de Zoysa resigned his seat in the Senate. On 5 August 1960, Governor General Goonetilleke appointed Bandaranaike to the Senate of Ceylon, the upper house of Parliament.

Initially, she struggled to navigate the issues facing the country, relying on her cabinet member and nephew, Felix Dias Bandaranaike. Opponents made dismissive comments about her "kitchen cabinet": she continued to face sexism while in office.

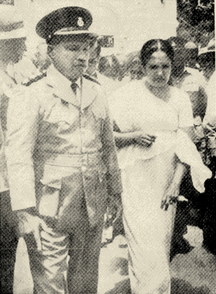
Bandaranaike and her military escort, pictured in 1961

In January 1961, Bandaranaike implemented a law making Sinhala the official language, replacing English. This action caused wide discontent among the more than two million Tamil-speakers. Urged on by members of the Tamil-centered Federal Party, a campaign of civil disobedience known as a satyagraha (due to its adherence to the theory coined by Mohandas Gandhi) began on February 20 in the two provinces with Tamil majorities: the Northern and Eastern Provinces. The movement expanded quickly within these provinces, growing to involve the other Tamil political parties. Demonstrators sent letters to public servants and sat in front of government building entrances asking arrivers to abstain from working, which most did. The spectacle attracted crowds that were largely sympathetic and often young, but not trained satyagrahis. Over time, the campaign began to involve plans to build independent public services like a postal system and police force, and to distribute public lands. Bandaranaike's response was to send in troops and police that harassed and assaulted satyagrahis as well as other interested members of the public and bystanders, while having many Federal Party leaders detained and banning the Federal Party for several months. The government declared a state of emergency on April 18 that would last two years.

In January 1962, conflicts erupted between the established elites: the predominantly right-wing Westernised urban Christians – including large contingents of Burghers and Tamils – and the emerging native elite, who were predominantly leftist Sinhala-speaking Buddhists. The changes caused by Bandaranaike's policies created an immediate shift away from the Anglophilic class system, power structures, and governance, significantly influencing the composition of the officer corps of the civil service, armed forces, and the police.

=== Ceylonese coup d'état attempt (1962) ===
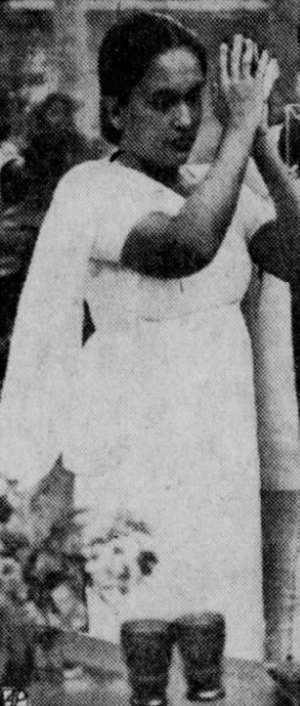
Bandaranaike praying in a 1962 photograph described as the "Praying Premier" by the Associated Press

Some military officers plotted a coup d'état, which included plans to detain Bandaranaike and her cabinet members at the Army Headquarters. When the police official Stanley Senanayake was taken into the confidence of the coup leadership, his father-in-law Patrick de Silva Kularatne informed the IGP. Immediately calling all service commanders and junior officers to an emergency meeting at Temple Trees, Felix Dias Bandaranaike and members of Criminal Investigation Department (CID) began questioning the military personnel and uncovered the plot.

Because the coup was aborted before it began, the trial process for the 24 accused conspirators was lengthy and complex. The retroactive Criminal Law Special Provision Act of 1962, which allowed consideration of hearsay evidence, was passed to aid in the conviction of the plotters. Though rumours circulated against Sir Oliver Goonatillake, the governor general, there was no real evidence against him and therefore no means of prosecuting him. He was neither "removed from office nor did he resign". He agreed to answer questions about his suspected involvement once he was replaced. In February Bandaranaike's uncle, William Gopallawa was appointed governor general. Goonatillake was escorted to the airport, left Ceylon, and went into voluntary exile.

=== Political developments (1962–1965) ===
In an attempt to balance east–west interests and maintain neutrality, Bandaranaike strengthened the country's relationship with China, while eliminating ties with Israel. She worked to maintain good relationships with both India and Russia, while keeping ties to British interests through the export of tea and supporting links with the World Bank. Condemning South Africa's apartheid policy, Bandaranaike appointed ambassadors to and sought relationships with other African nations.

Despite her success abroad, Bandaranaike was criticised for her ties with China and lack of economic development policies. Tensions were still high over the government's apparent favouritism of Sinhala-speaking Ceylonese Buddhists. The import-export imbalance, compounded by inflation, was impacting the buying power of middle- and lower-class citizens. In the mid-year by-election, although Bandaranaike held a majority, the United National Party made gains, indicating that her support was slipping.

In 1964, Bandaranaike's government abolished the independent Ceylon Civil Service and replaced it with the Ceylon Administrative Service, which was subject to government influence. When the United Left Front coalition between the Communist, Revolutionary Socialist and Trotskyist Parties was formed in late 1963, Bandaranaike moved left to try to gain their support. In February 1964, Chinese premier Zhou Enlai visited Bandaranaike in Ceylon with offers of aid, gifts of rice and textiles, and discussions to extend trade. The two also discussed the Sino-Indian border dispute and nuclear disarmament. The ties with China were attractive, as Bandaranaike's recent formal recognition of East Germany had eliminated incoming aid from West Germany and her nationalisation of the insurance industry had impacted her relationships with Australia, Britain and Canada.

In preparation for the second Non-Aligned Conference, Bandaranaike hosted presidents Tito and Nasser in Colombo in March 1964, but continued domestic unrest caused her to suspend parliamentary sessions until July. In the interim, she entered into a coalition with the United Left Front and was able to shore up her majority, though only by a margin of three seats.

In December 1964, her United Front government put forward the "Press Take Over Bill" in an attempt to nationalise the country's newspapers. The opposition and Bandaranaike's critiques claimed that the move was to muzzle a free press and strike at her major critic, the Lake House Group led by the press baron Esmond Wickremesinghe. Wickremesinghe responded with a campaign to remove her from office to safeguard the freedom of the press. On 3 December 1964, C. P. de Silva, who was at one time S. W. R. D. Bandaranaike's deputy, led thirteen SLFP parliamentarians and crossed over to the opposition citing the Press Take Over Bill. The government of Sirimavo Bandaranaike lost the throne speech by one vote and a general election was called for in March 1965. Her political coalition was defeated in the 1965 elections, ending her first term as prime minister.

=== Leader of the Opposition (1965–1970) ===
In the 1965 elections, Bandaranaike won a seat in the House of Representatives from the Attanagalla Electoral District. With her party gaining 41 seats, she became the Leader of the Opposition, the first woman ever to hold the post. Dudley Senanayake was sworn in as prime minister on 25 March 1965. Soon after, Bandaranaike's position as a member of parliament was challenged, when allegations were made that she had accepted a bribe, in the form of a car, while in office. A committee was appointed to investigate and she was later cleared of the charge.

During her five-year term in the opposition, she maintained her alliance with leftist parties. Of the seven by-elections held between November 1966 and April 1967, six were won by the opposition under Bandaranaike's leadership. Continued inflation, trade imbalance, unemployment, and the failure of expected foreign aid to materialise led to widespread discontent. This was further fuelled by austerity measures, which reduced the weekly rice stipend. By 1969, Bandaranaike was actively campaigning to return to power. Among other pledges, she promised to give two measures of rice per household, nationalise foreign banks and the import-export industry, establish watchgroups for monitoring business and government corruption, return to a foreign policy which leaned away from "imperialist" partners, and hold a Constituent Assembly charged with drafting a new Constitution.

=== Second Premiership (1970–1977) ===
Bandaranaike pictured in 1970

Bandaranaike regained power after the United Front coalition between the Communist Party, the Lanka Sama Samaja Party and her own Freedom Party won the 1970 elections with a large majority in May 1970. Upon returning to office as prime minister for a second term, Bandaranaike was sworn in before Governor-general William Gopallawa at Queen's House. In addition to the premiership, she assumed responsibility for the portfolios of Defence, External Affairs, Planning and Employment.

By July, she had convened a Constitutional Assembly to replace the British-drafted constitution with one drafted by the Ceylonese. She introduced policies requiring that permanent secretaries in the government ministries have expertise in their division. For example, those serving in the Ministry of Housing had to be trained engineers, and those serving in the Ministry of Health, medical practitioners. All government employees were allowed to join Workers Councils and at the local level and she established People's Committees to allow input from the population at large on government administration. The changes were intended to remove elements of British colonial and foreign influence from the country's institutions.

Bandaranaike received Pope Paul VI who undertook a short visit to Sri Lanka in December 1970. The visit which was confined to the Ratmalana Airport was highly significant as it was the first visit by a pope to Ceylon.

=== JVP insurrection (1971) ===
Despite Bandaranaike's efforts to address the country's economic problems, unemployment and inflation remained unchecked. After just 16 months in power, Bandaranaike's government was almost toppled by the 1971 Janatha Vimukthi Peramuna Insurrection of left-wing youths. Though aware of the militant stance of the Janatha Vimukthi Peramuna (People's Liberation Front), Bandaranaike's administration initially failed to recognise them as an imminent threat, dismissing them as idealists.

On 6 March, militants attacked the U.S. Embassy in Colombo, leading to the declaration of a state of emergency on 17 March. In early April, attacks on police stations evidenced a well-planned insurgency which Ceylon's small army was ill-equipped to handle. Calling on its allies for assistance, the government was saved largely because of Bandaranaike's neutral foreign policy. The Soviet Union, Britain, the United Arab Republic, the United States, Yugoslavia, East and West Germany, Norway, Poland, and India sent equipment or supplies, and both India and Pakistan sent troops. On 1 May, Bandaranaike suspended government offensives and offered an amnesty, which resulted in thousands of surrenders. The following month a second amnesty was offered. Bandaranaike established a National Committee of Reconstruction to re-establish civil authority and provide a strategic plan for dealing with those captured or surrendered insurgents. One of the Bandaranaike's first actions after the conflict was to expel North Korean diplomats, as she suspected they had fomented the radical discontent. The saying "She was the only man in her cabinet" – attributed to her political opponents in the 1960s – resurfaced during the height of the insurgency, as Bandaranaike proved that she had become a "formidable political force".

=== Republic of Sri Lanka (1972–1977) ===
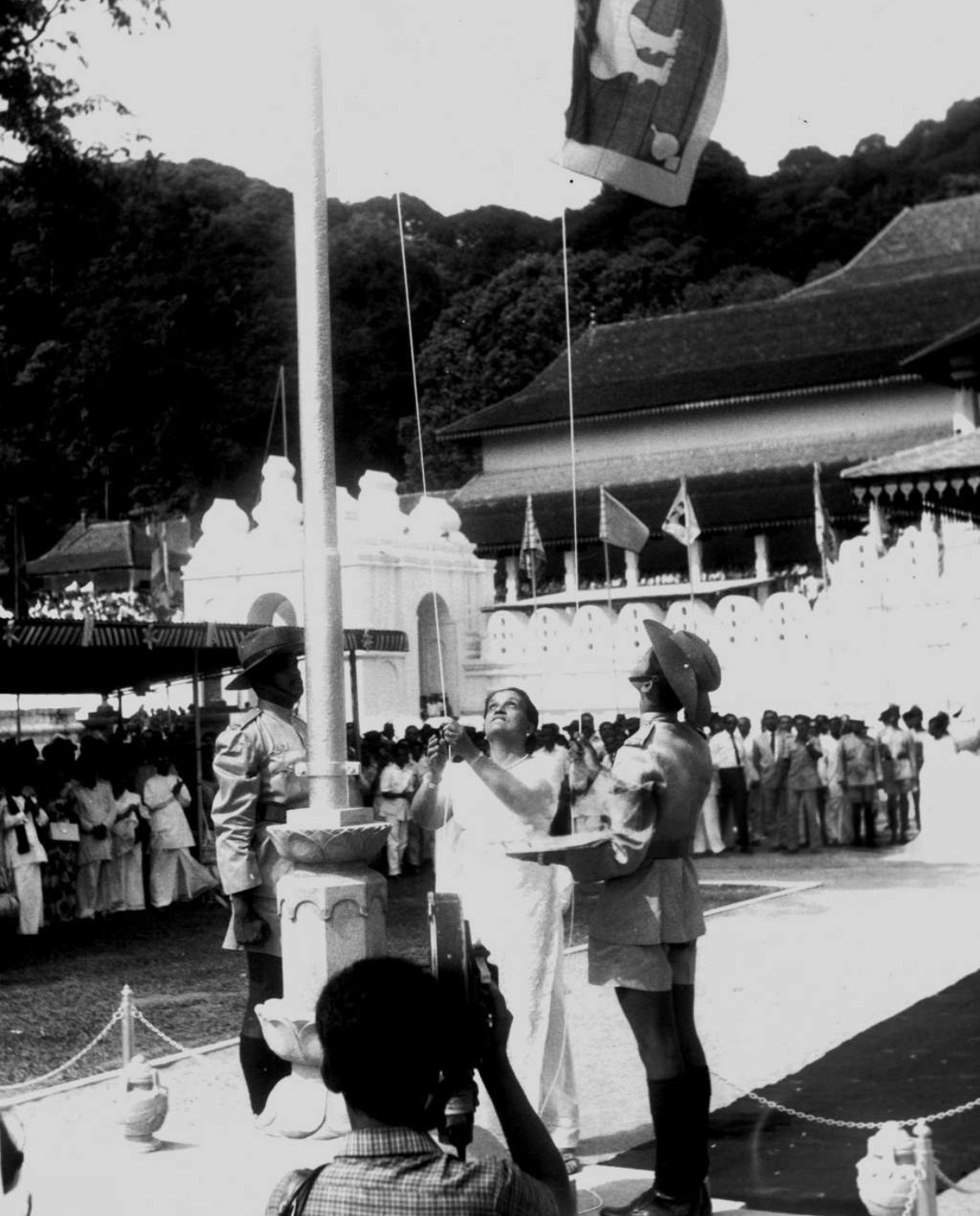
Bandaranaike raising the Sri Lankan flag on Republic Day, 1972

In May 1972, Ceylon was replaced by the Republic of Sri Lanka after a new Constitution was ratified. Though the country remained within the Commonwealth of Nations, Queen Elizabeth II was no longer recognised as its sovereign. Under its terms, the Senate, suspended since 1971, was officially abolished and the new unicameral National State Assembly was created, combining the powers of the executive, judicial and legislative branches in one authority. The constitution recognised the supremacy of Buddhism, though it guaranteed equal protection to Buddhism, Christianity, Hinduism, and Islam. It failed to provide a charter of inalienable rights, recognised Sinhala as the only official language, and contained no "elements of federalism".

The new constitution also extended Bandaranaike's term by two years, resetting the mandated five-year term of the prime minister to the coincide with the creation of the republic. These limits caused concern for various sectors of the population, specifically those who were uneasy about authoritarian rule, and the Tamil-speaking population. Before the month was out, the discontent escalated before leading to the passage of the Justices Commission Bill, establishing separate tribunals to deal with the imprisoned insurgents from the previous year. Those in opposition to the tribunals argued that they were a violation of the principles of human rights. By July, sporadic incidents of violence were resurfacing, and by the end of the year, a second wave of revolt was anticipated. Widespread unemployment fuelled the public's growing disillusionment with the government, in spite of land redistribution programmes enacted to establish farming cooperatives and limit the size of privately held lands.

In 1974, Bandaranaike forced the shut-down of the last independent newspaper group, The Sun, believing their criticism was fuelling unrest. Fissures appeared in the United Front coalition, largely resulting from the Lanka Sama Samaja Party's continued influence on trade unions and threats of strike actions throughout 1974 and 1975. When newly confiscated estates were placed under the Ministry of Agriculture and Lands, controlled by the Lanka Sama Samaja Party, fears that they would unionise plantation workers led Bandaranaike to oust them from the government coalition. Despite the split, the Sri Lanka Freedom Party (SLFP), led by Bandaranaike, retained a majority in the National State Assembly.

Following the dissolution of the First National State Assembly in May 1977, Bandaranaike began preparations for the 1977 general election to elect the eighth Parliament of Sri Lanka. In the general election, the United Front was soundly defeated, winning only eight seats.

=== Party Leader (1977–1988) ===
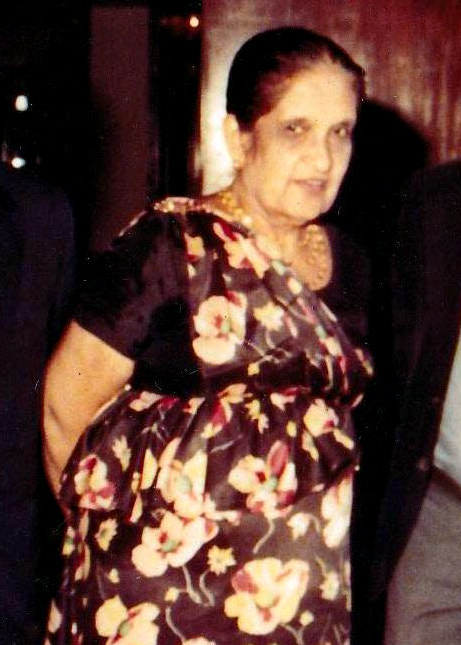
Bandaranaike in her later years (circa 1981)

Bandaranaike retained her parliamentary seat in Attanagalla in the 1977 general elections. In November 1977, a petition challenging her position as a member of parliament was dismissed by the Colombo High Court. In 1978, a new constitution was ratified, replacing the British-style parliamentary system with a French-style presidential system. Under the constitution, the executive or president, was elected by a vote of the people to serve a six-year term. The president then chose a prime minister to preside over the Cabinet, who was confirmed by the legislature. Providing a declaration of fundamental rights, guaranteeing the equality of citizens for the first time, it also recognised Tamil as a national language, though the administrative language remained Sinhala. Though aimed at appeasing Tamil separatists, the provisions did not stop the violence between Tamils and Sinhalese, resulting in the passage of the 1979 Prevention of Terrorism Act.

In a 1979 interview with India Today, Bandaranaike discussed her political future and criticised the government of J. R. Jayewardene. She acknowledged that her party had made mistakes and said she intended to rebuild and reactivate the Sri Lanka Freedom Party following its defeat in the 1977 general election. However, she rejected the idea of withdrawing from politics, stating that leaving after an electoral defeat would amount to cowardice. Bandaranaike criticised the government's borrowing from the World Bank and import liberalisation, arguing that they increased dependence on foreign goods that many Sri Lankans could not afford. She also condemned rising prices, restrictions on political activity, electoral changes and threats to judicial independence and civil rights, while noting growing public discontent, particularly in rural areas. The interview also highlighted Bandaranaike's close relationship with Indira Gandhi, whom she admired and with whom she said she had worked to resolve bilateral issues. Despite her reduced political standing after the 1977 election, the interview portrayed her as determined to remain active in Sri Lankan politics and challenge the governing United National Party.

When asked whether she considered herself a dictator, Bandaranaike rejected the label and accused President Jayewardene of abusing his parliamentary majority. She stated as follows:

"Never. And I don't hope to become one. If I was a dictator then Jayawardene is ten times worse. He is changing court judgements through Acts of Parliament. He is misusing his majority. He abolished, byelections, we didn't. At least, we had a civil war on, when the Bills curtailing basic rights were passed. But we did something which no other government has done. We rehabilitated thousands of insurgents who were caught. If I was a dictator, I would have; just shot them. Jayawardene keeps talking about his son being arrested by my government. He was taken in only for 24 hours on suspicion of possessing firearms but was released as soon as Jayawardene spoke to me."

Bandaranaike maintained a close relationship with Yugoslav President, Josip Broz Tito, a prominent leader of the Non-Aligned Movement (NAM) and a political counterpart of Bandaranaike. The two leaders participated together in numerous international forums and worked in support of advancing the objectives of the movement. Following Tito's death in May 1980, she travelled to Belgrade to attend his state funeral and pay her respects. During periods of illness, Tito had offered her access to medical facilities in Yugoslavia.

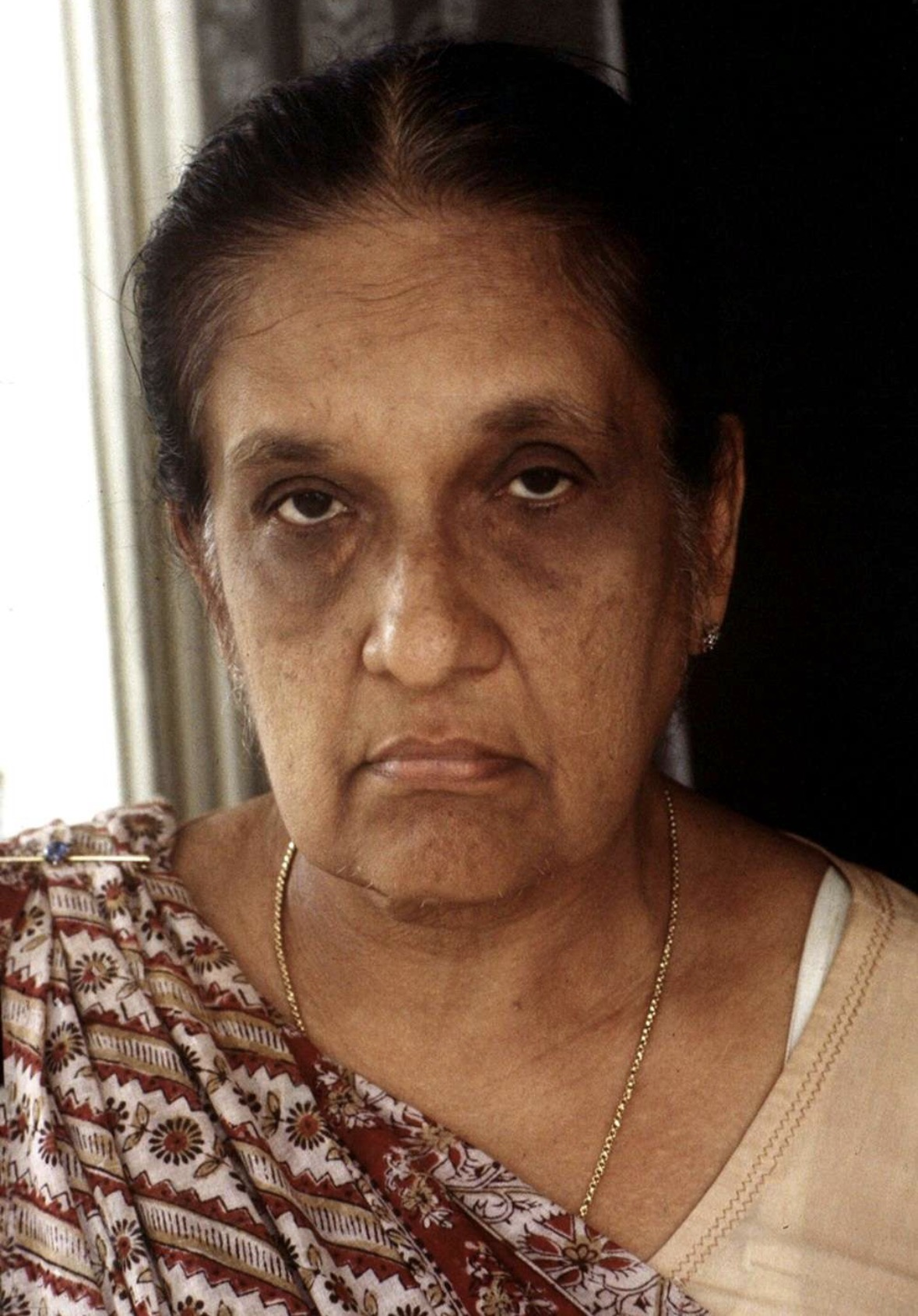
Bandaranaike pictured in 1980

In 1980, a Special Presidential Commission was appointed by President J. R. Jayawardene to investigate allegations against Bandaranaike for abuses of power during her tenure as prime minister. Following the submission of the report to Jayawardene, the United National Party government adopted a motion in parliament on 16 October 1980 to strip Bandaranaike and her nephew, Felix Dias Bandaranaike – who was convicted of corruption – of their civil liberties for a period of seven years. She was expelled from parliament, but maintained her role as party leader. The motion passed by 139 votes in favour and 18 against, easily meeting the required two-thirds threshold.

Despite being its head, Bandaranaike was unable to campaign for the Freedom Party. As a result, her son, Anura Bandaranaike served as the parliamentary party leader. Under Anura the Freedom Party moved to the right, and Bandaranaike's daughter, Chandrika, withdrew, forming the Sri Lanka People's Party with her husband, Vijaya Kumaratunga. The goals of the new party were related to rapprochement with the Tamils.

When Jayewardene's government moved to strip Bandaranaike of her civic rights, Indian Prime Minister Indira Gandhi unexpectedly expressed opposition to the decision. After the Presidential Commission's findings became public, Gandhi telephoned Bandaranaike to offer her sympathy and support. The SLFP publicised the conversation, prompting Anura Bandaranaike to announce plans to visit New Delhi to discuss the matter with Gandhi. Following Bandaranaike's expulsion from Parliament, Indira Gandhi publicly criticised the decision and the removal of her civic rights at a press conference in New Delhi. She also alleged that the Bandaranaike family was being harassed, reiterating her concerns on later occasions despite Sri Lankan objections to what it regarded as interference in its internal affairs.

From 1980, conflict between the government and separatists of various competing groups, including the Tamil Tigers, the People's Liberation Organisation of Tamil Eelam, the Tamil Eelam Liberation Army, and the Tamil Eelam Liberation Organization, became more frequent and increasingly violent. During local election campaigning in 1981, Tamil extremists assassinated Arumugam Thiagarajah, a prominent United National Party politician. On 11 June 1982, Bandaranaike wrote to British Prime Minister Margaret Thatcher challenging the seven-year civic disability imposed on her by a Special Presidential Commission. She argued that retrospective legal changes and restrictions on the Court of Appeal's jurisdiction undermined parliamentary democracy, maintaining that her government had been accountable to Parliament and the electorate. Bandaranaike appealed to the British government to consider referring her case to the United Nations Human Rights Committee under Article 41 of the International Covenant on Civil and Political Rights. She explained that Sri Lanka had accepted the committee's interstate complaint procedure but was not a party to the Optional Protocol allowing individual communications, and therefore sought the intervention of another state party that had recognised the committee's competence.

Presidential elections were held in Sri Lanka for the first time on 20 October 1982. Incumbent president J. R. Jayewardene of the governing United National Party (UNP) was re-elected, receiving 53% of all valid votes cast, defeating his main opponent Hector Kobbekaduwa of the Sri Lanka Freedom Party (SLFP). The Tamil United Liberation Front Party had called for a boycott of the presidential elections. Insurgents supported the ban, as they contended that co-operation with the government legitimised its policies and conflicted with the desire for attaining an independent Tamil state. The election was seen as a battle between capitalism and socialism. Kobbekaduwa, supporting the policies of the previous SLFP-led government under Bandaranaike, was expected to reverse many of the open-market and capitalist reforms introduced by Jayewardene.

A referendum on extending the term of Sri Lanka's Parliament was held on 22 December 1982, becoming the first—and, to date, only—national referendum held in the country. President J. R. Jayewardene proposed extending the life of the existing Parliament, which was due to expire in August 1983, by a further six years. Jayewardene argued that the extension was necessary to enable his government to complete its programmes, while opposition parties condemned the proposal and campaigned against it. Voters were then asked to vote either "yes" or "no", represented on the ballot by a lamp and a pot, respectively. Under, the Referendum Act No 7 of 1981, certified by Jayawardene on 27 February 1981, in order of the referendum to pass it had to meet one of two conditions. The proposal was approved by more than 54 percent of voters, allowing the Parliament elected in 1977 to remain in office until 1989.

"Casting your vote for the 'Pot' does not mean a vote for any party. It is not a vote against any party. The vote for the 'Pot' means a vote to retain the right of electing members of parliament and governments enjoyed by you since 1931."

— Bandaranaike, speaking to Rupavahini

Although she had been stripped of her civic rights, Bandaranaike was permitted to lead the opposition campaign against the referendum. She addressed several meetings each day and drew large crowds, while a broad coalition of opposition parties, including Tamil and communist parties, joined the campaign despite their differing political positions.

In 1983 insurgent Tamils ambushed an army patrol, killing thirteen soldiers. Retaliatory violence by Sinhalese mobs sparked riots against non-insurgent Tamils and their property throughout the country, later referred to as Black July.

Jayewardene's move towards free markets and a focus on economic growth hurt Tamil farmers in the north by removing trade protections. Similarly, the policies negatively impacted not only southern Sinhalese businesses facing competition from Indian markets, but also the urban poor, whose food subsidies were greatly reduced. Massive government spending for economic development created budget deficits and inflation, alarming the World Bank and International Monetary Fund administrators. In turn, donor agencies reduced aid to persuade the government to control spending. Acceleration of the Mahaweli Development programme which began under Bandaranaike's first term, increased employment and stabilised the food supply, also reducing dependence on foreign energy supplies with the completion of four hydropower-generating facilities.

The focus on building the economy and infrastructure failed to address social issues. For example, the rural housing initiative – which built some 100,000 new homes by 1984 – polarised communities because housing was distributed by political alliance rather than need. Privatisation of industry, after 1982, created significant gaps between the rich and poor and inflation returned, making goods hard to procure and lowering the standard of living.

In April 1984, Israeli Foreign Ministry official David Matani arrived in Colombo to organise the proposed Israeli interest section. After an SLFP MP raised the issue in Parliament, National Security Minister Lalith Athulathmudali gave a response described as evasive. Athulathmudali, who had taught law at an Israeli university, was also involved in the negotiations. In May 1984, Jayewardene presented the draft agreement to the Cabinet. Muslim ministers M. H. Mohamed and A. C. S. Hameed opposed it, warning that it would damage relations with Sri Lanka's Muslim community and Middle Eastern states. Jayewardene insisted that combating Tamil militancy took priority, and both ministers remained in office. Other senior ministers supported the agreement, despite protests by Muslims against the proposed Israeli interest section. Jayewardene dismissed the opposition, arguing that resistance to Israel's involvement amounted to support for terrorism.

His position drew criticism from political opponents, including Bandaranaike, who issued a statement condemning the agreement:

"As leader of the SLFP and as the head of the government which ordered the closing down of the Israeli Mission I denounce this decision which may lead to only bringing the Arab-Israeli conflict and all its violence to our homeland at a time when this island itself is threatened with so much violence. I call on all patriotic forces, regardless of race, creed and political affiliations to oppose this step which is a blatant attack on the national interests of Sri Lanka and its people."

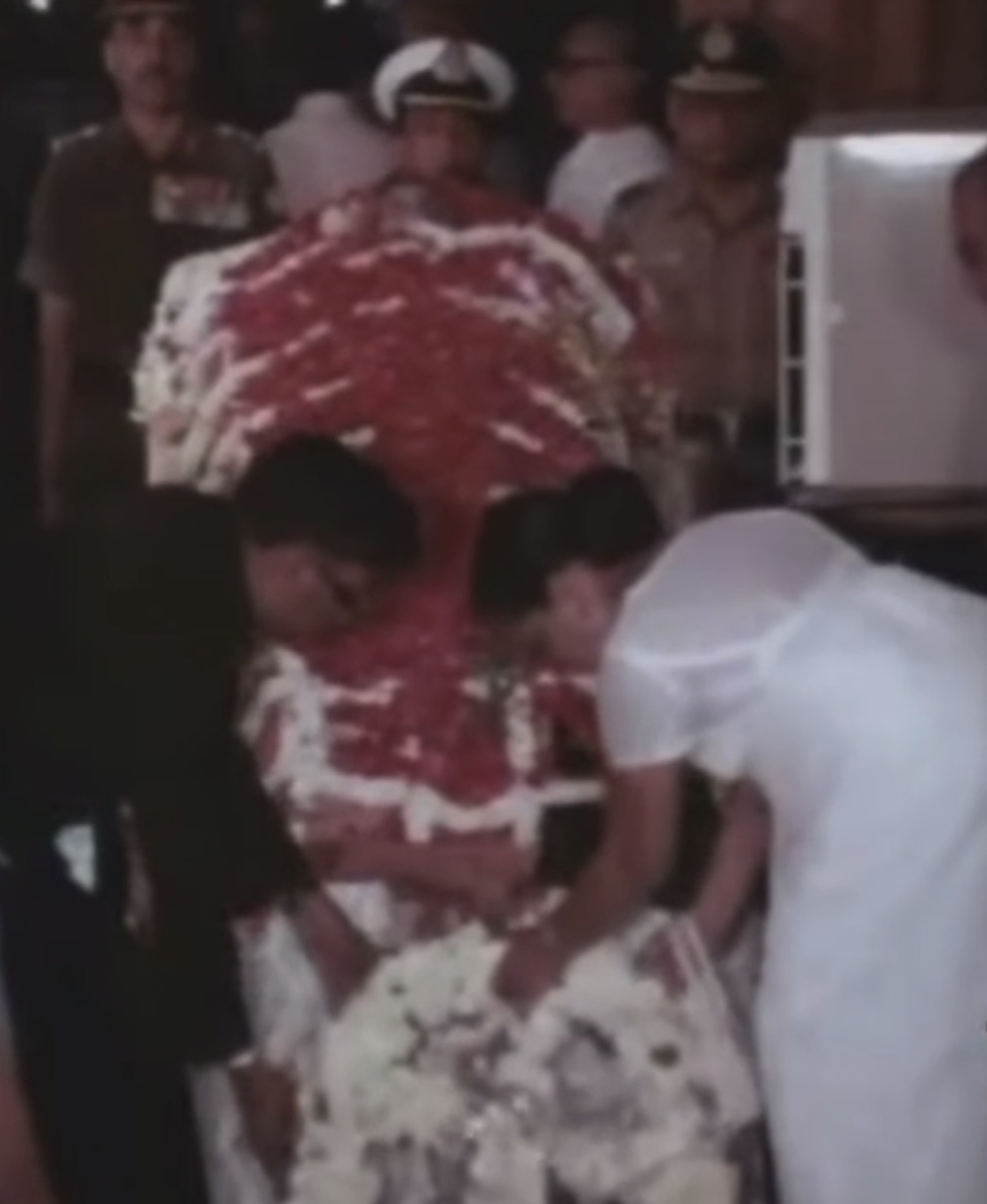
Bandaranaike laying a wreath at the state funeral of Indira Gandhi, 1984

On the 31st of October, 1984, Indian prime minister Indira Gandhi was assassinated by her own bodyguards. Bandaranaike was her Sri Lankan counterpart. The two women forged a loyal friendship that remained steadfast for nearly thirty years, since they first met in London, 1956. Reports state that Bandaranaike was "deeply saddened" at Gandhi's death. Among other world leaders, she attended the funeral in New Delhi with her older daughter Sunethra Bandaranaike, and her son Anura Bandaranaike, who was Leader of the Opposition. Although her civic rights were stripped, her attendance at the funeral was one of the most significant public appearances during her period of political disqualification.

In January 1986, Bandaranaike's civic rights were restored by a presidential decree issued by Jayewardene. Jayewardene showed little sympathy for the issues of concern to the Tamils and instead blamed the unrest on left-wing factions plotting a government overthrow. Bandaranaike and the Freedom Party opposed the introduction of Indian troops, believing the government had betrayed its own people by allowing India to intervene on behalf of the Tamils. As a reaction to state-sanctioned violence and their desire for nationalist focus, the Janatha Vimukthi Peramuna militants re-emerged in the south. She held Jayewardene responsible for the violence that had engulfed Sri Lanka, arguing that inflation, unemployment and what she described as corruption at the highest levels of society had fuelled discontent among young people.

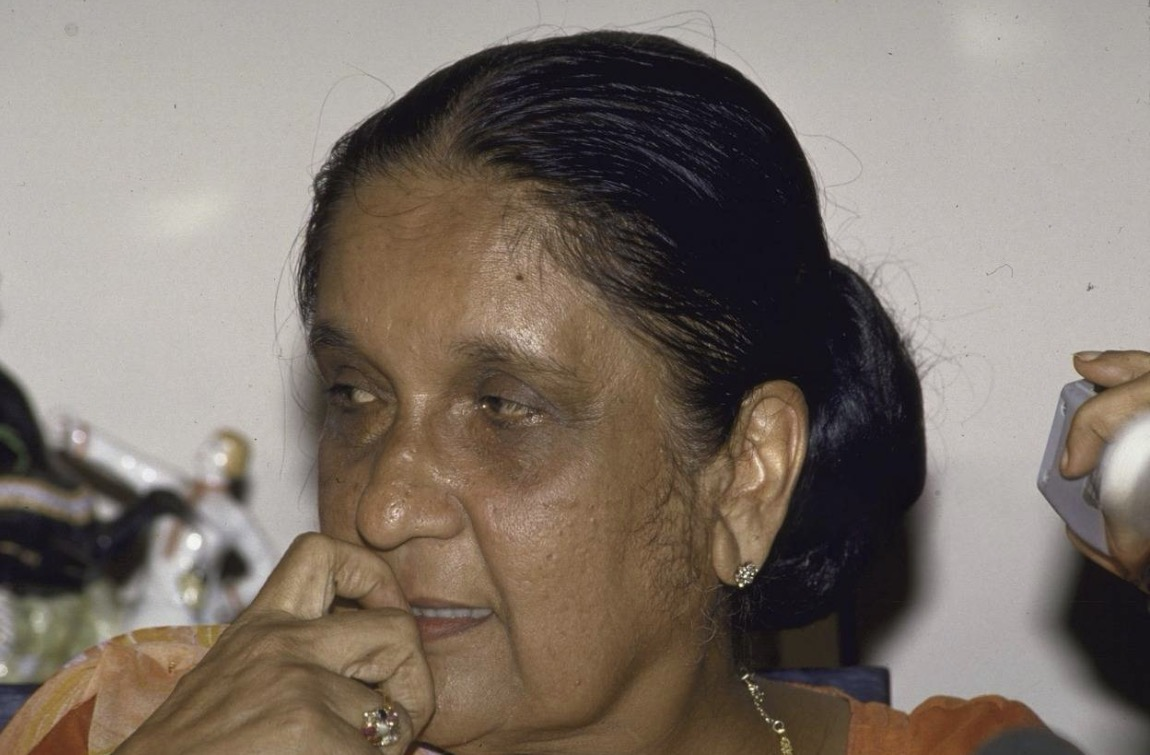
Sirimavo Bandaranaike at a press conference, 1988

Against this backdrop, Bandaranaike decided to run in the 1988 presidential election. It was held on the 19th of December, 1988. Bandaranaike, the SLFP candidate, promised to abrogate the controversial Indo-Lanka Accord and remove the Indian Peace Keeping Force (IPKF) from the country. She was narrowly defeated by Ranasinghe Premadasa, who succeeded Jayewardene as president. On the 22nd of December, 1988, Bandaranaike contested the outcome of the presidential election and that she would challenge the result, in the Supreme Court of Sri Lanka. She held a news conference at her home, and blamed electoral misconduct, ballot stuffing, intimidation and fraud caused by the UNP government and the military, for her defeat. Bandaranaike stated "The election results are something that I cannot accept".

Reports from areas that were considered strongholds for Bandaranaike, indicated that some voters alleged polling stations had been closed by security forces, rather than the militants. Observers also questioned Premadasa's large vote totals, in constituencies where he was believed to have limited support or where voter turnout was reportedly low. During the press conference, she alleged that the electoral processes were manipulated. She claimed that ballot boxes were diverted to polling stations instead of authorised counting centres, where fraudulent ballots were inserted. She displayed a number of blank ballot papers that she said had been obtained from a polling station.

=== Leader of the Opposition (1989–1994) ===
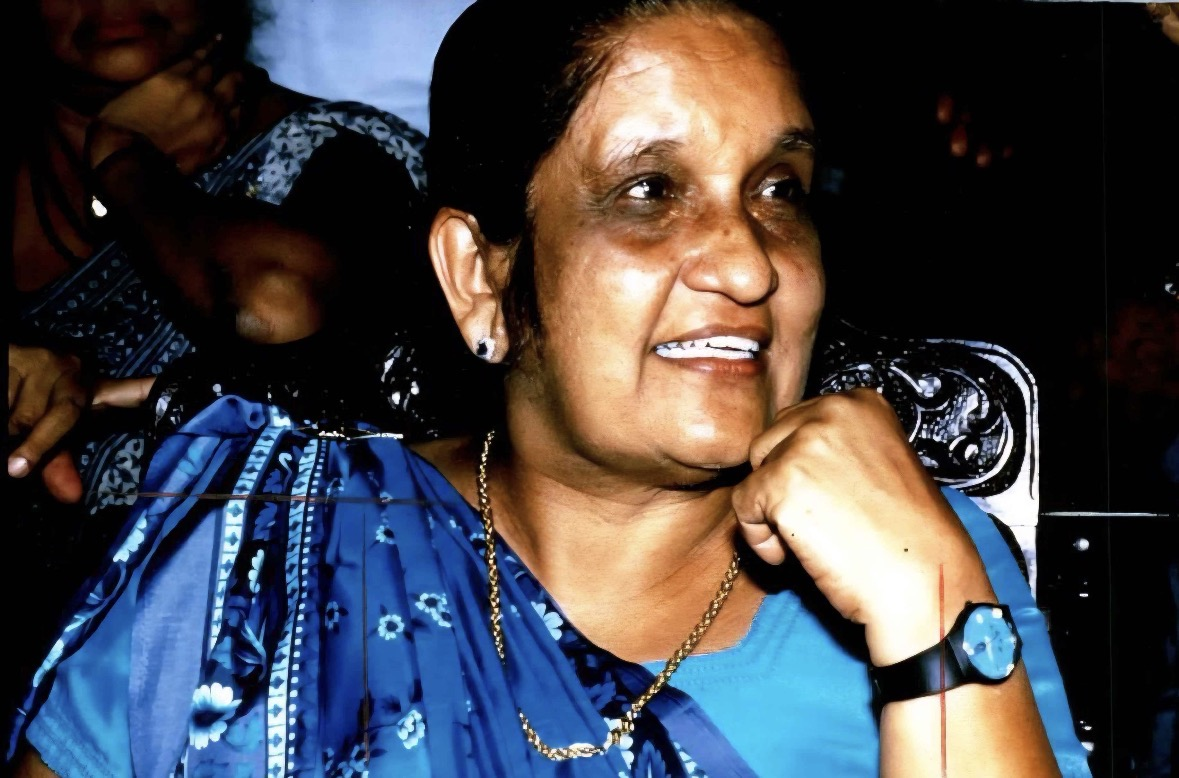
Bandaranaike pictured in 1989

On 6 February 1989, while campaigning for the Freedom Party in the 1989 general election, Bandaranaike survived a bombing attack. Though she was unscathed, one of her aides suffered leg injuries. In the final results on the 19th, the Freedom Party was defeated by the United National Party under Ranasinghe Premadasa, but gained 67 seats, sufficient for Bandaranaike to take up the post of Leader of the Opposition for a second term. She was successfully re-elected to parliament in the Gampaha Electoral District. The same year, the government crushed the Janatha Vimukthi Peramuna rebels, killing some 30,000 to 70,000 of them, rather than opting for trials or imprisonment as Bandaranaike had done in 1971.

On 13 July 1989, Tamil political leader and former Leader of the Opposition Appapillai Amirthalingam was assassinated alongside Vettivelu Yogeswaran by members of the Liberation Tigers of Tamil Eelam (LTTE). According to a later account, journalist Lasantha Wickrematunge informed Bandaranaike of the killings. When she learned that the LTTE was responsible, she reportedly expressed relief that Amirthalingam had not been killed by a Sinhalese person, remarking: "I am so glad that no Sinhalese killed him." Her reaction was presented as reflecting her concern that the assassination might otherwise have intensified ethnic tensions between Sinhalese and Tamils.

In 1990, when the 13-month ceasefire was broken by the Tamil Tigers, after other militias surrendered their weapons, the government decided to break off negotiations with the Tigers and employ a military solution. Anura supported the move, but his mother, Bandaranaike, spoke against the plan. When emergency powers were assumed by the president, she demanded that the state of emergency be lifted, accusing the government of human rights abuses.

During her tenure as opposition leader, she supported the impeachment of Premadasa in 1991, which was led by senior United National Party members such as Lalith Athulathmudali and Gamini Dissanayake. The impeachment failed, as Premadasa adjourned Parliament and the speaker M. H. Mohamed dismissed the motion for impeachment, stating there were not enough signatures supporting it. Bandaranaike's daughter Chandrika Kumaratunga, who had been living in self-imposed exile in London since 1988, when her husband had been assassinated, returned to Sri Lanka and rejoined the Freedom Party in 1991. In the same year, Bandaranaike, who was increasingly impaired by arthritis, suffered a stroke.

In 1992, Premadasa Udugampola, head of the Bureau of Special Operations, was forced to retire after an international outcry over human rights abuse surfaced. Udugampola provided a written statement that the death squads used against rebels had been backed by the government. Bandaranaike came out in support of his evidence, but Udugampola was charged for cultivating public hostility against the government. When President Premadasa was assassinated by a suicide bomber on 1 May 1993, his prime minister Dingiri Banda Wijetunga was sworn as acting president and nominated to complete the president's unexpired term until 12 November 1994. The members of Parliament were required to vote on the succession within a month. Due to her failing health, Bandaranaike chose not to run for the presidency, but to continue as opposition leader, and Wijetunga ran unopposed.

Wijetunga convinced Bandaranaike's son, Anura, to defect to the United National Party and rewarded him with an appointment as Minister of Higher Education. His defection left Bandaranaike and Kumaratunga in charge of the Freedom Party. Due to her mother's declining health, Kumaratunga led the formation of a new coalition, the People's Alliance (PA), to contest the 1993 provincial election in the Western Province of Sri Lanka in May. The alliance won a landslide victory, and Kumaratunga was appointed as the chief minister in 1993. Subsequently, the coalition led by Kumaratunga also won the southern provincial council elections. Kumaratunga led the People's Alliance campaign for the 1994 parliamentary election, as her mother was recovering from surgery. During the election campaign, reports suggested that tensions had arisen between Bandaranaike and her daughter behind the scenes. Bandaranaike was reportedly upset at being excluded from a reception hosted by Chandrika Kumaratunga for First Lady Hillary Clinton.

The Alliance won a decisive victory, and Bandaranaike announced that Kumaratunga would become prime minister. By this time Kumaratunga had also succeeded her as the leader of the Freedom Party. Mentally alert but suffering from a foot ailment and complications from diabetes, Bandaranaike used a wheelchair. Having been re-elected to parliament, she was appointed to her daughter's cabinet as a Minister without Portfolio at the swearing-in ceremony held on 19 August 1994.

=== Third Premiership (1994–2000) ===
In the presidential election that followed in November, Kumaratunga's main political rival, Gamini Dissanayake, was assassinated two weeks before the election. His widow, Srima Dissanayake, was chosen as the United National Party's presidential candidate. Kumaratunga's lead was predicted to be around a million votes even before the assassination; she won the election by a wide margin. Becoming the first female President of Sri Lanka, Kumaratunga appointed her mother as prime minister, which under the terms of the 1978 constitution meant Bandaranaike was responsible for defence and foreign affairs. Though the office of prime minister had become mainly a ceremonial post, Bandaranaike's influence in the Freedom Party remained strong. While they agreed on policy, Kumaratunga and Bandaranaike differed on leadership style.

In 1994, Bandaranaike initiated the establishment of a diplomatic training institute to support the professional development of the Foreign Service and provide training for career diplomats. She appointed Vernon Mendis, a senior career diplomat and member of the first batch of the Ceylon Foreign Service, as its director-general. The institute subsequently expanded its programmes and activities, developing into an international and regional centre that attracts students and experts from Sri Lanka and abroad.

By 2000, Bandaranaike was the world's oldest serving Premier at the age of 84. Kumaratunga wanted a younger prime minister, Bandaranaike, citing health reasons, stepped down in August 2000. Her resignation marked the end of a four-decade political career in which she rose to become Prime Minister three times and served as Leader of the Opposition on two occasions.

== Death and state funeral ==
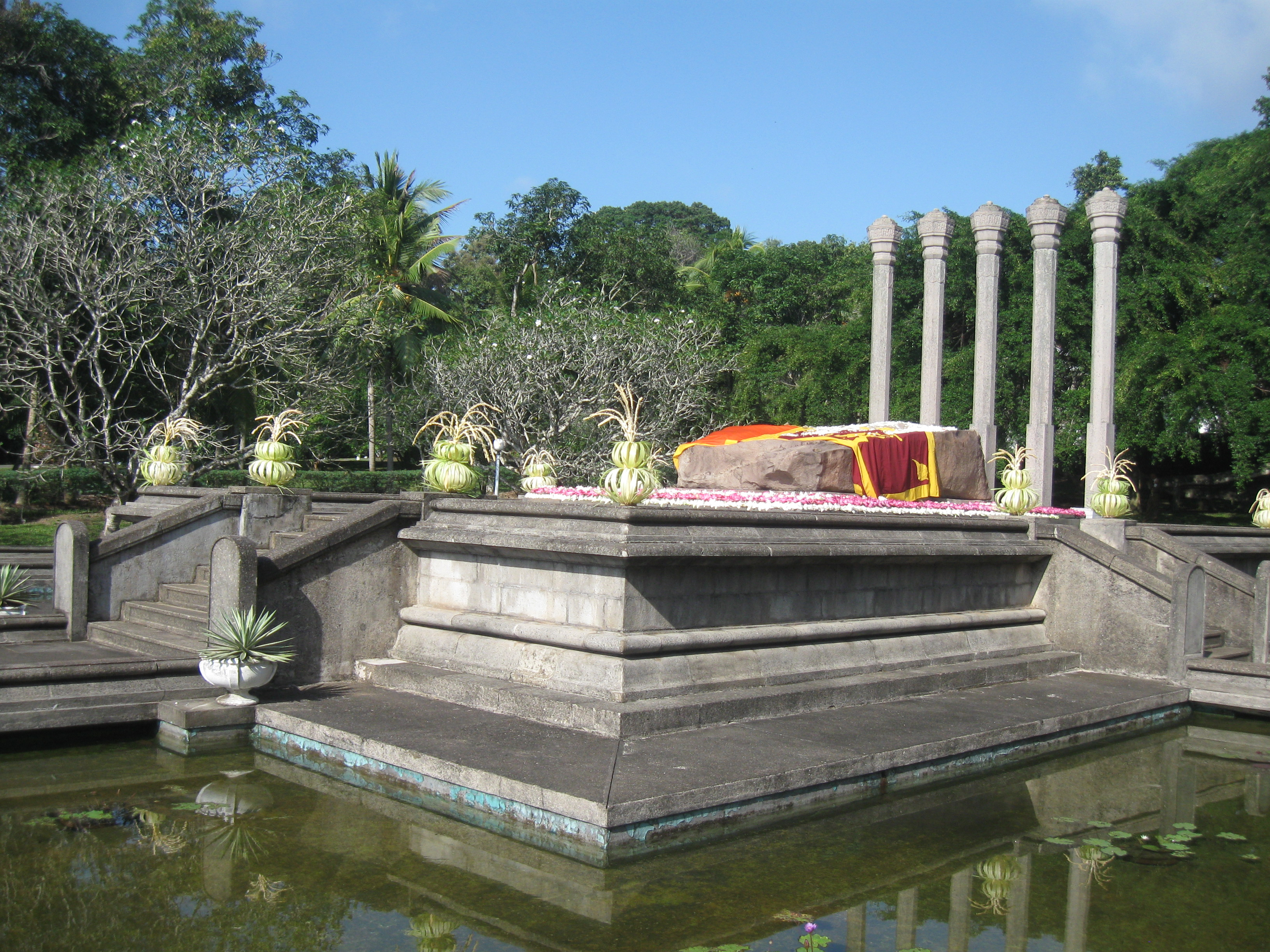
Bandaranaike Samadhi (where S. W. R. D. Bandaranaike and Sirimavo Bandaranaike were entombed) at Horagolla, Sri Lanka

Bandaranaike died on 10 October 2000 of a heart attack at Kadawatha. She had been casting her vote in the parliamentary election, which had been held that day. Sri Lanka declared two days of national mourning, and state radio stations abandoned their regular programming to play funeral laments.

Bandaranaike's state funeral was held following the two days of national mourning. Her flag-draped coffin was carried on a gun carriage in a procession led by personnel from Sri Lanka's three armed services, accompanied by a 19-gun salute, from the grounds of her family estate in Nittambuwa. A two-kilometre section of the main highway near the estate was closed to accommodate mourners who gathered along the route. Liquor stores, cinemas and slaughterhouses were requested to close during the funeral. The proceedings were broadcast on television and attracted widespread public attention across the country. President Chandrika Kumaratunga, Bandaranaike's daughter, and Bandaranaike's son Anura were present at the ceremony as Buddhist monks recited prayers and blessings. The mourners included Indian Vice President Krishan Kant, foreign dignitaries and Sri Lankan political leaders.

In accordance with Bandaranaike's wishes, she was buried rather than cremated, in keeping with the traditional Buddhist practice. Her remains lay in state in the parliament, and her funeral subsequently took place at Horagolla, where she was interred in the mausoleum, Horagolla Bandaranaike Samadhi, originally built for her husband.

Condolences and tributes were also sent by international leaders, including Indian President K. R. Narayanan and Chinese Premier Li Peng, who acknowledged Bandaranaike's political career and international role. One newspaper described Bandaranaike as a pioneer for women in political leadership, noting that her example preceded the rise of other female national leaders, including Golda Meir, Indira Gandhi and Margaret Thatcher. The Sri Lanka Freedom Party paid tribute to Bandaranaike, describing her as a "heroic mother of the nation." The party she had led, however, had subsequently evolved in its policies and political positions from those associated with her tenure.

== Foreign policy ==
Foreign policy was widely regarded as one of the most successful aspects of Bandaranaike's governments. Building on the policy framework established during her late husband's tenure, she further developed and elevated Sri Lanka's policy of non-alignment, bringing it greater international prominence amidst the Cold War period.

=== Non-Aligned Movement ===
Bandaranaike played an active role in the Non-Aligned Movement (NAM), attending its first four summits in Belgrade (1961), Cairo (1964), Lusaka (1970) and Algiers (1973). She advocated non-alignment as an independent foreign-policy approach for developing countries, opposing pressure from the Cold War power blocs and promoting peaceful dispute resolution. She also supported the establishment of zones of peace, particularly in the Indian Ocean, and called for greater economic cooperation and collective self-reliance among developing nations.

In 1976, Sri Lanka hosted the fifth NAM summit in Colombo, bringing together representatives of 86 member states. Bandaranaike became chairperson of the movement for one year, succeeding Algerian president Houari Boumédiène. Under her leadership, the summit emphasised economic development, international cooperation and the establishment of a New International Economic Order. The conference was held at the newly constructed Bandaranaike Memorial International Conference Hall, a gift from China in memory of her late husband.

=== United Nations and international development ===
In October 1971, Bandaranaike proposed declaring the Indian Ocean a "Zone of Peace" at the 26th session of the United Nations General Assembly. Sponsored by Ceylon and Tanzania, the proposal was discussed with UN Secretary-General U Thant and received support from several countries, with Ceylon and India seeking further backing. In April 1974, Bandaranaike proposed a World Fertiliser Fund at the ECAFE session to address the global food crisis. The proposal was considered at the World Food Conference in Rome later that year and contributed to the establishment of the UN International fertiliser Supply Scheme.

At the 1974 World Food Conference, Sri Lanka also proposed establishing the International Fund for Agricultural Development (IFAD), emphasising irrigation financing. The proposal influenced discussions on international agricultural development, although the fund's final structure differed from Sri Lanka's original plan. She was later feted at the UN World Conference on Women hosted in Mexico City, attending as the only woman prime minister elected in her own right.

=== South Asia ===
Bandaranaike's South Asian foreign policy was characterised by strict non-alignment, the balancing of relations with regional and global powers, and the promotion of regional peace.

==== India ====
During the premiership of Jawaharlal Nehru, Bandaranaike's relations with India were shaped in particular by her efforts to mediate the Sino-Indian conflict following the outbreak of the Sino-Indian War in 1962. In November and December of that year, she convened conferences in Colombo with representatives of Burma, Cambodia, Ceylon, Ghana and the United Arab Republic to discuss possible approaches to the dispute. Bandaranaike subsequently travelled with Ghanaian justice minister Kofi Asante Ofori-Atta to India and Peking in an effort to broker a settlement. In January 1963, Bandaranaike and Ofori-Atta secured a significant diplomatic development when Nehru agreed in New Delhi to introduce a motion in the Indian Parliament recommending the settlement proposals advanced by Bandaranaike.

Following Jawaharlal Nehru's death on 27 May 1964, Bandaranaike attended his funeral in New Delhi alongside international leaders, including British Prime Minister Alec Douglas-Home, US Secretary of State Dean Rusk and Soviet official Alexei Kosygin. She had maintained close ties with Nehru through bilateral relations and the Non-Aligned Movement.

In September 1964 Bandaranaike led a delegation to India to discuss the repatriation of the 975,000 stateless Tamils residing in Ceylon. Along with Indian prime minister Lal Bahadur Shastri, she ironed out the terms of the Srimavo-Shastri Pact, a landmark agreement for the foreign policy of both nations. Under the agreement, Ceylon was to grant citizenship to 300,000 of the Tamils and their descendants while India was to repatriate 525,000 stateless Tamils. During the 15 years allotted to complete their obligations, the parties agreed to negotiate terms for the remaining 150,000.

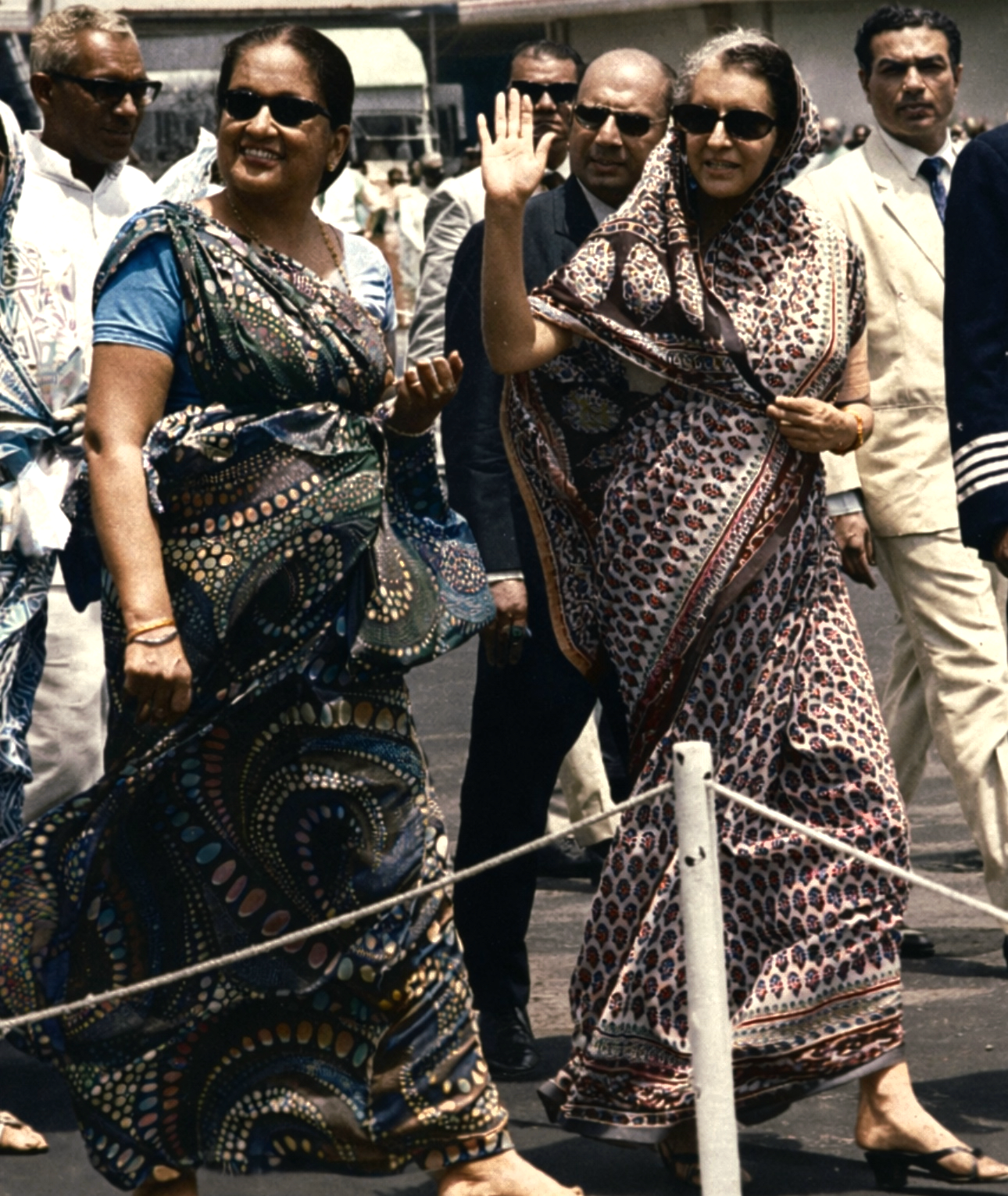
Bandaranaike with Indian Prime Minister Indira Gandhi, 1973

Bandaranaike enjoyed cordial and personal relations with Indian prime minister Indira Gandhi, her Indian counterpart, during a period regarded as a high point in relations between India and Sri Lanka. Building upon the Sirima–Shastri Pact of 1964, the two leaders signed the Sirima–Gandhi Pact on 28 June 1974 to address the status of the remaining 150,000 people of Indian origin in Sri Lanka whose citizenship had been left unresolved under the earlier agreement. The pact sought to further resolve the issue of stateless persons of Indian origin and contributed to the settlement of one of the principal issues affecting relations between the two countries.

Bandaranaike with Indian Prime Minister Indira Gandhi, 1976

Later in 1974, Bandaranaike and Gandhi concluded the Indo-Sri Lankan Maritime agreement, which sought to resolve the maritime boundary between the two countries in the Palk Strait. Under the agreement, India recognised Katchatheev, a small island in the Palk Strait, as falling within Sri Lankan territory. The island is located between Neduntheevu, Sri Lanka and Rameswaram, India and has been traditionally used by both Sri Lankan Tamil and Indian Tamil fishermen. This agreement represented another significant development in relations between India and Sri Lanka during their respective premierships.

Another agreement signed in 1976 further defined the maritime boundary between the two countries and restricted fishermen from each country from fishing within the other's exclusive economic zones.

==== Pakistan ====
As part of her efforts to strengthen Sri Lanka's international relations, Bandaranaike also sought to develop closer ties with Pakistan. She hosted Pakistani president Ayub Khan during a state visit, during which he addressed the Sri Lankan Parliament.

Bandaranaike with Pakistani Prime Minister Zulfikar Ali Bhutto and First Lady, Nusrat Bhutto, 1975

Bandaranaike continued to strengthen relations with Pakistan during her second premiership. At the invitation of Prime Minister Zulfikar Ali Bhutto, she undertook a state visit to Pakistan in September 1974, during which she addressed a joint session of the Senate and National Assembly, becoming the first Sri Lankan leader to do so. She also visited Karachi to observe development activities. In December 1975, Bhutto visited Sri Lanka and addressed the National State Assembly, becoming the second Pakistani leader to do so. During his visit, he held discussions with Bandaranaike on developments in Pakistan following the country's breakup after the Indo-Pak War of 1971, as well as Sri Lanka's earlier support for Pakistan, including its decision to permit the refuelling of civilian aircraft travelling between East and West Pakistan.

In July 1977, during Sri Lanka's general election campaign, Pakistani Chief Martial Law Administrator Zia-ul-Haq sent a crate of mangoes from Multan, Punjab, to Prime Minister Bandaranaike through the Pakistan High Commission in Colombo. The gift was accompanied by a letter from Zia-ul-Haq.

Bandaranaike returned the mangoes to Pakistan's ambassador, stating that she could not accept a gift from Zia-ul-Haq, whom she held responsible for the fate of former prime minister Zulfikar Ali Bhutto. She praised Bhutto's advocacy for developing countries and requested that the gift be returned. The incident followed her appeals to Zia-ul-Haq to spare Bhutto's life, including an offer to receive him in Sri Lanka if he were permitted to go into exile. Her refusal was seen as a protest against Bhutto's execution and Zia-ul-Haq's military rule.

=== Southeast Asia ===
In 1976, Bandaranaike undertook a tour of Southeast Asia, visiting Indonesia, Burma, Malaysia and the Philippines. In Jakarta, she met President Suharto, with the visit reflecting the two countries' shared commitment to non-alignment and their earlier connections through the 1955 Asian–African Conference in Bandung. She subsequently visited Burma, where she held discussions with Prime Minister Sein Win and President Ne Win, and met Khin Kyi, the widow of Burmese independence leader Aung San and mother of Aung San Suu Kyi. In Malaysia, Bandaranaike met Prime Minister Hussein Onn and other senior government officials, who expressed appreciation for Sri Lanka's earlier decision to permit a hijacked aircraft travelling from Kuala Lumpur to refuel in Colombo; she was also received by King Sultan Yahya Petra. Her tour concluded with a three-day visit to the Philippines, where President Ferdinand Marcos and First Lady Imelda Marcos hosted her and discussions were held on bilateral cooperation in trade, industry, finance, education and agriculture.

=== East Asia ===
Bandaranaike's foreign policy towards East Asia was characterised by efforts to strengthen diplomatic and economic relations, particularly with the People's Republic of China. Her government also engaged with other countries in the region as part of Sri Lanka's wider policy of non-alignment and cooperation with developing nations.

==== China ====
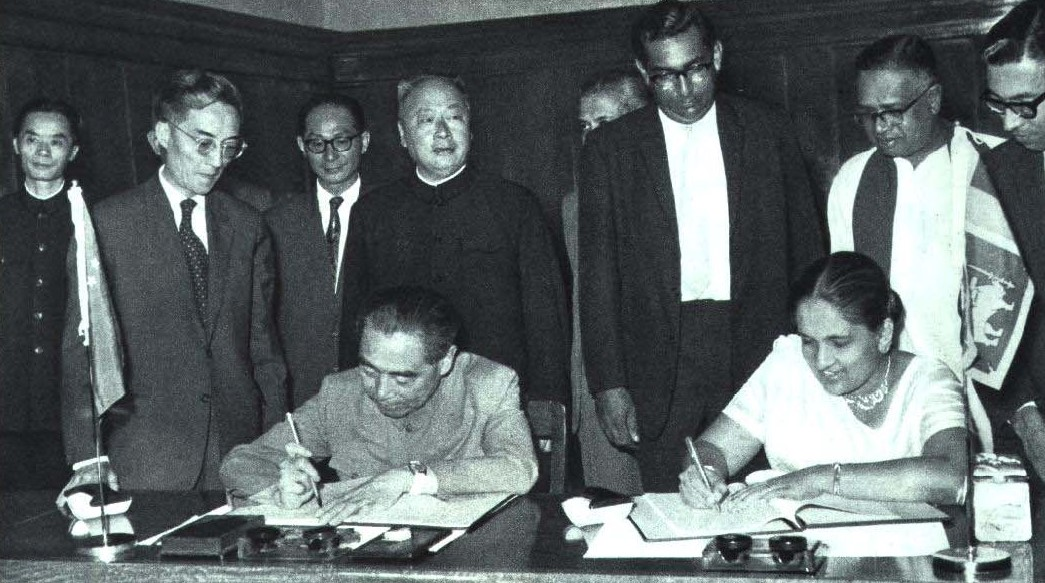
Zhou Enlai and Bandaranaike, in 1964

In 1964 Chinese premier Zhou Enlai made a four-day visit to Ceylon, his second visit to the country following his first in 1957, when diplomatic relations between the two countries were established during the premiership of Bandaranaike's late husband S. W. R. D. Bandaranaike. During discussions with Sirimavo Bandaranaike, it was agreed that China would provide an international conference hall as a gift to Ceylon. The hall was named after S. W. R. D. Bandaranaike in recognition of his role in establishing and promoting diplomatic relations between the two countries and as a symbol of Sino–Ceylonese friendship.

During a state visit to China in 1972, Bandaranaike met with Chinese leader Mao Zedong, Premier Zhou Enlai and other senior Chinese officials. In discussions with the Chinese leadership, she outlined her government's Five-Year Plan, following which China provided Sri Lanka with a long-term, interest-free loan. The talks also addressed international issues, including her proposal to declare the Indian Ocean a Zone of Peace, which received Chinese support, as well as the situations in Indo China, Palestine and South Asia. During the visit, she also travelled to Shenyang, Dalian and Shanghai.

==== Japan ====
In November 1976, Bandaranaike's East Asian tour concluded with a visit to Tokyo, where Bandaranaike held talks with Japanese prime minister and counterpart Takeo Miki. Following their discussions, Japan pledged increased grant and project assistance to Sri Lanka. During the visit, Bandaranaike also travelled to Mikimoto Pearl Island and Kyoto, and was received by Emperor Hirohito and Empress Nagako.

=== Middle East ===
Bandaranaike pursued a broadly pro-Arab foreign policy in the Middle East, strengthening Sri Lanka's relations with Arab states while supporting Palestinian causes.

==== The United Arab Republic ====
Bandaranaike with Egyptian President Gamal Abdel Nasser and First Lady Tahia Kazem, 1963

During a visit to the United Arab Republic in October 1963, Bandaranaike met with President Gamal Abdel Nasser and Prime Minister Ali Sabri. Ceylon's support for Egypt during the 1956 Suez Crisis contributed to the favourable reception she received during the visit. Discussions focused on disarmament and the situation in South Vietnam, while the United Arab Republic also agreed to increase its purchases of Ceylonese tea. Egypt had previously worked closely with Ceylon during the Sino–Indian border dispute and participated in efforts to prevent the conflict from escalating.

Following the death of Egyptian president Gamal Abdel Nasser in September 1970, Bandaranaike attended his funeral and declared two days of national mourning in Ceylon. She regarded Nasser with particular gratitude for his assistance during an earlier oil shortage, when he had promptly dispatched vessels to the island.

==== Iraq ====
In April 1975, Bandaranaike undertook a four-day visit to Iraq amid the economic pressures faced by oil-importing developing countries following sharp increases in global oil prices. During discussions with Iraqi vice president Saddam Hussein, she raised concerns about the impact of rising oil prices on developing countries. Iraq subsequently agreed to supply Sri Lanka with 250,000 tonnes of oil under a four-year deferred-payment arrangement at a low rate of interest.

==== Israel and Palestine ====
During the 1970s, Bandaranaike's government sought to develop relations with the Palestine Liberation Organisation (PLO), despite the organisation's reported links with Tamil separatist groups. Several PLO representatives visited Sri Lanka and urged the government to sever diplomatic relations with Israel.

During her 1970 election campaign, Bandaranaike pledged to close the Israeli embassy in Sri Lanka in support of the Palestinian cause. After returning to power, her government closed the embassy and subsequently severed diplomatic relations with Israel, citing its alleged violation of United Nations Security Council Resolution 242, despite several threats by lobbies in the United Kingdom to boycott Ceylon tea. The decision was welcomed by several Arab leaders, who viewed it as an expression of support for the Palestinian cause. Later in 1975, the Palestine Liberation Organisation (PLO) established a Palestinian embassy in Sri Lanka, a year after the establishment of the Sri Lanka-Palestine Solidarity Committee.

=== Africa ===
Bandaranaike was strongly opposed to apartheid in South Africa and supported the imposition of economic sanctions against the country. Speaking in the Senate, she argued that such measures could only be effective if they were implemented collectively by countries around the world. She also expressed support for Nelson Mandela and the struggle against apartheid in South Africa. Although the two never met, she raised concerns about his imprisonment and apartheid in international forums and reportedly sent Mandela letters of support during his imprisonment. Following his release, Mandela acknowledged the support he had received from Bandaranaike and Sri Lanka during his imprisonment.

In January 1975, Zambian President Kenneth Kaunda, with whom Bandaranaike had previously interacted at several international forums, visited Sri Lanka while preparations were underway for the upcoming Non-Aligned Movement summit.

=== Europe ===
Bandaranaike's foreign policy maintained close relations with the Soviet Union and other socialist states in Eastern Europe. While formally committed to non-alignment, her government expanded political, economic and diplomatic cooperation with these countries as part of Sri Lanka's broader engagement with the socialist world.

==== Soviet Union ====
Aware of the risks associated with reliance on a single superpower during the Cold War, Bandaranaike sought to strengthen relations with the Soviet Union. In October 1963, she became the first woman and Sri Lankan prime minister to undertake a state visit to the Soviet Union, where she held extensive discussions with Premier Nikita Khrushchev. During the visit, she negotiated an agreement for the purchase of Soviet oil at reduced prices, with Ceylon expected to increase its imports after the Ceylon Petroleum Corporation assumed responsibility for the country's petroleum distribution from 1 January 1964. The visit, described as a "mission of friendship", was welcomed by the Soviet authorities. Addressing a state function in Moscow, she also noted that the visit had fulfilled a wish shared with her late husband, S. W. R. D. Bandaranaike, whose planned visit to the Soviet Union had been prevented by his assassination.

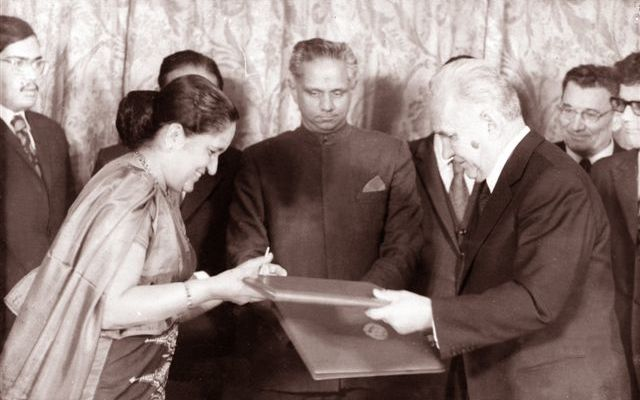
Bandaranaike with Soviet Union Prime Minister Alexei Kosygin, Senior Advisor (Foreign Affairs) to the Prime Minister Tissa Wijeyeratne and Anura Bandaranaike

In November 1974, Bandaranaike returned to the Soviet Union during her second term, on an official visit, travelling to Tashkent, Moscow and Tbilisi. During the visit, she met with Premier Alexei Kosygin and Foreign Minister Andrei Gromyko, and the discussions further strengthened relations between Sri Lanka and the Soviet Union. A special aircraft was provided by the Soviet government for Bandaranaike and her delegation's travel to and from Moscow.

On 17 July 1976, a bronze statue of Bandaranaike's late husband S. W. R. D. Bandaranaike was unveiled in Galle Face Green, Colombo. The monument was sculpted by Lev Kerbel and was gifted from the Soviet Union.

==== Yugoslavia ====
Bandaranaike with Yugoslav President Josip Broz Tito, 1976

Bandaranaike also maintained close relations with Yugoslav President Josip Broz Tito, a prominent leader of the Non-Aligned Movement, despite Sri Lanka's extensive engagement with the Soviet Union. Tito had visited Ceylon in January 1959, and he and Bandaranaike subsequently participated together at numerous international forums. Their interactions during her periods in office contributed to the development of relations between Sri Lanka and Yugoslavia, and their association continued beyond Bandaranaike's time in political office.

==== Eastern Bloc Countries ====
In October 1963, Bandaranaike visited Czechoslovakia, where she met with prime minister Jozef Lenárt and President Antonín Novotný. She also travelled to Poland and held discussions with prime minister Józef Cyrankiewicz. During her visit, she was received by the Polish Women's League, which expressed admiration for her achievements.

==== Western Europe ====
During her periods in office, Bandaranaike met with four British prime ministers: Harold Macmillan, Alec Douglas-Home, Harold Wilson and Edward Heath. In October 1971, Bandaranaike undertook a four-day official visit to the United Kingdom as a guest of Prime Minister Edward Heath. She expressed appreciation for British support provided earlier that year in response to the JVP insurrection in Ceylon. During the visit, she met Queen Elizabeth II, Heath and former prime minister and then Foreign Secretary Alec Douglas-Home, and discussed the potential implications for Ceylon of Britain's proposed accession to the European Economic Community with Geoffrey Rippon, the British government's chief negotiator on the matter.

In 1964, Bandaranaike's government's formal recognition of East Germany resulted in the suspension of aid from West Germany. Later, relations between Sri Lanka and West Germany improved. In September 1974, Bandaranaike visited West Germany at the invitation of Chancellor Helmut Schmidt, where discussions focused on the global energy crisis and its impact on developing countries.

During a visit to Oslo, in October 1976, Bandaranaike met with Norwegian prime minister Odvar Nordli. Nordli acknowledged Sri Lanka's role in international affairs, including its participation in the Non-Aligned Movement(NAM) and the Third United Nations Conference on the Law of the Sea, which was chaired by Sri Lankan diplomat Shirley Amerasinghe. He also commented on domestic policies pursued by Bandaranaike's government, including land reform, the expansion of education, increased state control over key sectors of the economy and public-health programmes.

=== North America ===
As a founding participant in the Non-Aligned Movement who led Sri Lanka's delegation to its first five summits, Bandaranaike maintained relations with both sides of the Cold War divide. Despite Sri Lanka's policy of non-alignment, she engaged extensively with both the United States and the Soviet Union, using these relationships to address international issues, coordinate positions with other developing countries and pursue Sri Lanka's national interests.

==== United States ====
In December 1961, Bandaranaike wrote to United States President John F. Kennedy following the introduction of an American policy to dispose of surplus natural rubber from its stockpiles, which contributed to a decline in global rubber prices. As Ceylon was heavily dependent on rubber exports, she drew attention to the potential consequences for the country's economy and urged the United States to reconsider the policy. Kennedy subsequently acknowledged the seriousness of the situation and assured Bandaranaike that the United States would seek to minimise the policy's impact on the global rubber market. The disposal programme was modified shortly afterwards.

In April 1962, Bandaranaike again wrote to Kennedy, this time protesting the United States' resumption of nuclear testing. She argued that the tests undermined international efforts towards disarmament and a ban on Nuclear weapons testing, and expressed concern over what she described as the disregard for the position of non-aligned countries committed to nuclear disarmament. In his reply to Bandaranaike, Kennedy referred to her earlier speech at the Belgrade summit, in which she had emphasised the need for effective systems of inspection and control during each stage of disarmament. While acknowledging possible differences over what constituted effective inspection and control, Kennedy noted their shared support for the principle.

In June 1963, Bandaranaike's government made the Ceylon Petroleum Corporation the sole importer and distributor of petroleum products in the country, resulting in the nationalisation of foreign oil companies. The decision, which was intended to conserve foreign exchange and ensure a reliable supply of petroleum, caused concern in Washington and London. The nationalisation led to the invocation of the Hickenlooper Amendment, restricting United States aid to Ceylon, although Kennedy subsequently sought to maintain and improve relations between the two countries.

In November 1963, Bandaranaike learned of the assassination of U.S. president John F. Kennedy, with whom she had maintained regular correspondence since both assumed office within months of one another. In a letter of condolence to First Lady Jacqueline Kennedy, Bandaranaike expressed sympathy as both a wife and mother who had herself lost her husband through assassination.

Bandaranaike with U.S. President Richard Nixon, 1971

While visiting the United States to address the United Nations General Assembly in 1971, Bandaranaike also made a private visit to Washington, D.C. She held bilateral discussions with President Richard Nixon in the Oval Office and met with Secretary of State William P. Rogers. She was also hosted by First Lady Pat Nixon. President Nixon had previously visited Ceylon in November 1953 while serving as Vice President of the United States.

==== Canada ====
Bandaranaike with Canadian Prime Minister Pierre Trudeau, 1971

Canadian prime minister Pierre Trudeau's four-day visit to Ceylon was an important development in relations between the two countries. Bandaranaike and Trudeau developed a cordial relationship that continued during their respective periods in office. Trudeau also cited Ceylon's accommodation of two languages and four religions as an example in discussions concerning linguistic and cultural diversity in Canada. Later in October 1971, Bandaranaike visited Canada in what was regarded as a reciprocal visit following Trudeau's earlier visit to Ceylon. Discussions focused on issues before the United Nations, developments in South Asia and Canadian assistance to Ceylon. During the visit, Bandaranaike, in her capacity as Minister of External Affairs and Defence, also met with Canadian foreign minister Mitchell Sharp.

==== Mexico ====
During a visit to Mexico in June 1975, Bandaranaike held discussions with President Luis Echeverría and senior government ministers. The talks resulted in Mexico agreeing to increase its purchases of Ceylonese cinnamon. Echeverría subsequently visited Sri Lanka.

== Economic policy ==
=== Nationalisation and state control ===
To further her husband's policy of nationalising key sectors of the economy, Bandaranaike established a corporation with public-private shareholders, taking control of seven newspapers. She nationalised banking, foreign trade, and insurance, as well as the petroleum industry. In taking over the Bank of Ceylon and establishing branches of the newly created People's Bank, Bandaranaike aimed to provide services to communities with no previous banking facilities, spurring local business development. In December 1960, Bandaranaike nationalised all the parochial schools that were receiving state funding. In doing so she curtailed the influence of the Catholic minority, who tended to be members of the economic and political elite, and extended the influence of Buddhist groups. Beginning in 1961, trade unions began a series of strikes in protest of high inflation and taxes. One such strike immobilised the transport system, motivating Bandaranaike to nationalise the transport board.

Other cabinet ministers were reassigned in an attempt to stem the drift toward Soviet trade partnerships, which had gained ground after the creation of the Ceylon Petroleum Corporation. The Petroleum Corporation had been launched in 1961 to bypass the monopolistic pricing imposed on Middle Eastern oil imports, allowing Ceylon to import oil from the United Arab Republic and the Soviet Union. Some of the storage facilities of western oil operatives were co-opted with a compensation agreement, but continuing disputes over non-payment resulted in suspension of foreign aid from the United States in February 1963. In reaction to the suspension of aid, the Parliament passed the Ceylon Petroleum Corporation Amendment Act nationalising all distribution, import-export, sales and supply of most oil products in the country, with the changes taking effect in January 1964.

In December 1970, the Business Undertaking Acquisition Act was passed, allowing the state to nationalise any business with more than 100 employees. Ostensibly, the move aimed to reduce foreign control of key tea and rubber production, but it stunted both domestic and foreign investment in industry and development.

=== Economic management ===
Lack of support for austerity measures, specifically the inability to import adequate rice – the main dietary staple – caused the resignation of Minister Felix Dias Bandaranaike during her first term.

During her second term, Bandaranaike faced budget deficits of $195 million – caused by rising energy and food-importation costs and declining revenue from coconut, rubber and tea exports – Bandaranaike attempted to centralise the economy and implement price controls. Pressed by the leftist members of her coalition to nationalise the foreign banks of British, Indian and Pakistani origin, she realised that doing so would impact the need for credit. As she had in her previous regime, she tried to balance the flow of foreign assistance from both capitalist and communist partners.

The 1973 oil crisis had a traumatic effect on the Sri Lankan economy. Still dependent on foreign assistance, goods and monetary aid from Australia, Canada, China, Denmark, Hungary, and the World Bank, Bandaranaike eased the austerity programmes that limited importation of consumer goods. The United States terminated aid grants, which required no repayment, and changed to a policy of providing foreign loans. Devaluation of the Sri Lankan currency, coupled with inflation and high taxes, slowed economic growth, consequently creating cyclical pressure to address deficits with even higher taxes and austerity measures. Uncontrolled inflation between 1973 and 1974 led to economic uncertainty and public dissatisfaction.

=== Later assessments ===
In a later assessment of Bandaranaike's economic policies, President Maithripala Sirisena argued that continued support for domestic industries could have strengthened Sri Lanka's manufacturing sector. He criticised the open-economy policies introduced in 1977 during the premiership of J. R. Jayewardene, arguing that increased imports weakened local industries. Other commentators contended that nationalisation had failed to deliver its expected economic benefits, citing losses among state-owned enterprises, bureaucratic inefficiency, political interference and shortages of capital, technology and managerial expertise. After 1977, the United National Party government moved towards economic liberalisation and privatisation.

== Domestic policy ==
=== Education ===
In 1971, the government introduced a system of standardisation of marks for admissions to the universities which was directed against Tamil-medium students. K. M. de Silva describes it as follows:

"The qualifying mark for admission to the medical faculties was 250 (out of 400) for Tamil students, whereas it was only 229 for the Sinhalese. Worse still, this same pattern of a lower qualifying mark applied even when Sinhalese and Tamil students sat for the examination in English. In short, students sitting for examinations in the same language, but belonging to two ethnic groups, had different qualifying marks."

Therefore, the government policy of standardisation was in essence a discriminatory regulation to curtail the number of Tamil students selected for certain faculties in the universities. The benefits enjoyed by Sinhalese students as a result of this also meant a significant fall in the number of Tamil students within the Sri Lankan university student populace.

University selection of 1971 was allocated proportionate to the number of participants who sat for the entrance examination in that language. As guaranteed before the exam, Tamil share was reduced to the proportion of the Tamils medium students (according to 1971 census, 27% of the total population used Tamil as first medium).

Bandaranaike's government introduced affirmative action in university admissions, initially favouring Sinhalese students before adopting regional quotas across ethnic and religious groups. The policies were criticised for prioritising factors other than academic merit and reducing Tamil representation in science and medical faculties. In the 1971, some Sinhalese complained of Tamils overrepresentation in universities, especially in engineering and the sciences. This resulted in the government also introducing lower university entrance qualifying marks for Sinhalese-medium students applying to science faculties, as shown in the table below:

Course of study	Medium	Minimum marks, 1971
Engineering	Sinhalese Tamils	227 250
Medicine and Dentistry	Sinhalese Tamils	229 250
Bio-science	Sinhalese Tamils	175 181
Physical Sciences	Sinhalese Tamils	183 204

From 1972, Bandaranaike's government reformed educational assessment to broaden access and introduce continuous, decentralised evaluation in pre-vocational studies. However, implementation was criticised as rushed and insufficiently developed. Also in 1972, the government added district quota as a parameter within each languages. 30% of university places were allocated on the basis of island-wide merit; half the places were allocated on the basis of comparative scores within districts and an additional 15% reserved for students from under privileged districts.

By 1973, Sri Lanka's literacy rate had exceeded 80 percent, among the highest in Asia. This was attributed in part to the country's longstanding policy of providing free education through the university level.

On 6 October 1974, Bandaranaike formally declared the University of Jaffna open at the premises of Parameshwara College, which had been founded by Ponnambalam Ramanathan in 1921. The establishment of the university provided the Northern Province with a new institution of higher education. In December 1974, Bandaranaike inaugurated the Bandaranaike Centre for International Studies, an institution established to promote the study of international relations, international law and diplomacy.

=== Healthcare ===
In 1961, Bandaranaike's government enacted the Ayurveda Act No. 31 of 1961, providing a statutory framework for Ayurveda and traditional medicine in Ceylon. The Act established the Department of Ayurveda and provided for the regulation of Ayurvedic practitioners and healthcare institutions, as well as the development of Ayurvedic education and research. It came into operation in October 1962.

In 1971, the government established a National Pharmaceuticals Policy following the recommendations of a commission chaired by Dr S. A. Wickremasinghe and Professor Senaka Bibile. The commission had been appointed to examine the country's pharmaceutical trade and recommended the establishment of a national policy and a state institution to regulate the sector. The policy aimed to provide quality medicines at affordable prices by promoting generic drugs and rational prescribing, reducing reliance on more expensive branded products.

Sri Lanka's pharmaceutical policy attracted international attention, receiving support from the World Health Organization and other UN agencies. UNCTAD examined it as a model for developing countries and published Case Studies in the Transfer of Technology: Pharmaceutical Policies in Sri Lanka, with assistance from Seneka Bibile.

The first Five-Year Health Plan for 1972–1976 placed greater emphasis on preventive healthcare. Its priorities included improving immunisation services and health education, addressing nutritional anaemia among pregnant women, and expanding rural water-supply and sanitation schemes. The plan also contributed to the gradual strengthening of primary healthcare during the 1970s.

=== Land reform ===
In 1972, Bandaranaike introduced major land reforms in Sri Lanka, with the enactment of the Land Reform Act of No. 01 of 1972 which imposed a ceiling of twenty hectares on privately owned land, this was later followed up by the Land Reform (Amendment) Act in 1975 that nationalized plantations owned by public companies. The objective of these land reforms were to grant lands to landless peasants. Critiques claimed that the second wave of reforms were targeted the wealthy landowners that had traditionally supported the United National Party. As a result of these reforms the state became the largest plantation owner and two entities, the Sri Lanka State Plantations Corporation, the Janatha Estate Development Board (People's Estate Development Board) and the USAWASAMA (Upcountry Cooperative Estate Development Board) were established to manage these estates. In the years following these land reforms, the production of the key export crops which Sri Lanka depended on for the in follow of foreign currency dropped.

=== Social welfare ===
In recognition of International Women's Year in 1975, Bandaranaike created an agency to focus on women's issues, which would later become the Ministry of Women and Child Affairs. She appointed the first woman to serve in the Sri Lankan Cabinet, Siva Obeyesekere, first as First State Secretary for Health and later as Minister of Health.

=== Mahaweli Development Programme ===
In 1961, Bandaranaike's government initiated the process that eventually led to the Mahaweli Development programme by seeking assistance from the United Nations Special Fund to survey the Mahaweli ganga Basin and the Dry Zone of Ceylon. The programme was subsequently developed as a multipurpose rural-development project based on the water resources of the Mahaweli Ganga and six associated river basins. Its objectives included expanding irrigation and agricultural production, generating hydroelectric power, creating employment, settling landless farming families and providing flood control. The programme also involved the development of new townships, village centres and settlements, together with supporting services such as education, healthcare and agricultural assistance. It was originally planned for implementation over 35 years.

The first phase, initiated under Bandaranaike's government and implemented from 1970, was completed in 1976. It included diversion headworks at Polgolla and Bowatenna, a 40 MW hydroelectric power station at Ukuwela, and improvements to water supplies serving approximately 52,700 hectares of existing irrigated land. By the end of 1995, all the headworks of the Accelerated Mahaweli Programme (AMP) had been completed and were functioning. Feasibility studies were scheduled to be completed in respect of the proposed Moragahakanda Project.

=== Language policy ===
The Official Language Act No. 33 of 1956, commonly known as the Sinhala Only Act, made Sinhala the sole official language of Ceylon, replacing English and excluding Tamil from official-language status. Following the anti-Tamil riots of 1958, Prime Minister S. W. R. D. Bandaranaike's government introduced the Tamil Language (Special Provisions) Act No. 28 of 1958. The Act provided for the use of Tamil as a medium of instruction in schools and universities, as a language for examinations for entry into the public service, subject to provisions concerning proficiency in Sinhala, and for official correspondence and administrative purposes in the Northern and Eastern Provinces.

After Sirimavo Bandaranaike became prime minister in January 1960, her government continued the implementation of the Sinhala Only policy. In 1961, it enacted the Language of the Courts Act No. 3 of 1961, which provided for Sinhala as the language of the courts. Regulations giving effect to the Tamil Language (Special Provisions) Act were eventually approved in January 1966 under the government of Dudley Senanayake. However, the adoption of the 1972 Constitution during Bandaranaike's second premiership entrenched Sinhala as the official language, while provisions concerning Tamil remained subordinate to the constitutional language framework.

"the Tamils felt indignant that it was specifically stated in the constitution that the provisions relating to the Tamil language could be amended by ordinary legislation whereas the provisions relating to the Sinhalese were constitutionally entrenched."

The policy turned out to be "severely discriminatory" and placed the Tamil-speaking population at a "serious disadvantage". As a Sinhalese academic A. M. Navaratna Bandara writes: "The Tamil-speaking people were given no option but to learn the language of the majority if they wanted to get public service employment. [...] A large number of Tamil public servants had to accept compulsory retirement because of their inability to prove proficiency in the official language". It also entailed that a Sinhalese officer working in Tamil areas was exempted from learning Tamil, but a Tamil officer working in even Tamil areas had to learn Sinhala. The effects of these policies were dramatic as shown by the drastic drop of Tamil representation in public sector: "In 1956, 30 percent of the Ceylon administrative service, 50 percent of the clerical service, 60 percent of engineers and doctors, and 40 percent of the armed forces were Tamil. By 1970 under Sirimavo Bandaranaike's government, those numbers had plummeted to 5 percent, 5 percent, 10 percent, and 1 percent, respectively." For much of the 1960s government forms and services were virtually unavailable to Tamils, and this situation only partly improved with later relaxations of the law.

== Electoral history ==
Electoral history of Sirimavo Bandaranaike
Election	Constituency	Party	Votes	Result
1965 parliamentary	Attanagalla	Sri Lanka Freedom Party	26,150	Elected
1970 parliamentary	Attanagalla	Sri Lanka Freedom Party	31,612	Elected
1977 parliamentary	Attanagalla	Sri Lanka Freedom Party	30,226	Elected
1988 presidential	Sri Lanka	Sri Lanka Freedom Party	2,289,860	Not Elected
1989 parliamentary	Gampaha District	Sri Lanka Freedom Party	214,390	Elected

== Personal life ==
Bandaranaike was closely connected to her family, her Buddhist faith and the traditions of the Kandyan household in which she had grown up. She was accustomed from childhood in looking after her younger siblings. Her early experience of family life helped shape her own approach to running a household and raising her children. Bandaranaike devoted much of her time to raising her three children, Sunethra, Chandrika and Anura. The family divided its time between their Colombo residence and Horagolla Walawwa, the ancestral home of the Bandaranaike family. Before her husband's political career brought increasingly demanding responsibilities into their household, she was primarily occupied with the children and the management of family life. She also entertained her husband's political associates, visitors and other guests, and became accustomed to the frequent demands of a busy household.

Her children later recalled that she was a capable and organised mother who maintained firm standards at home. She was not, however, particularly demonstrative in the modern sense of frequently cuddling or physically indulging her children. Her daughter Chandrika and other family members recalled that their father had been more openly affectionate, while their mother tended to express her care through practical attention and the responsibilities she undertook for them. Her children also remembered differences in the attention she gave to each of them. Sunethra was described in the family recollections as the favoured elder daughter, while Anura, her only son, was particularly cherished. Chandrika recalled sometimes feeling like the less-favoured child in comparison with her older sister and younger brother. Despite these differences, the children remained closely connected to their mother throughout their lives, and Chandrika eventually became one of her mother's most important companions in public and private life.

In later life, Bandaranaike became a grandmother to Chandrika's children. Her grandchildren remembered her as a distinctive and somewhat formal figure within the family. One particularly memorable example concerned her grandson Vimukthi, who was a fussy eater. Rather than insisting that he eat foods he disliked, Bandaranaike made little duck-shaped preparations to conceal eggs in his food. Her grandchildren also remembered visiting her at Horagolla and spending time with her when they returned home from abroad. Yasodhara shared memories of her grandmother from holidays spent in Sri Lanka, while Vimukthi contributed recollections from his time in England.

=== Interests ===
Bandaranaike's interests included cooking and baking. Her daughter Chandrika recalled that her mother enjoyed cooking and was particularly good at preparing cakes and puddings. At the family's Rosmead Place residence in Colombo, she had a small baking area equipped with a Baby Belling oven. Baking was one of the ways in which she maintained a connection with domestic routines, and her children remembered the food she prepared as part of their family life. Another of Bandaranaike’s recreational interests was tennis. After moving to Colombo as a young married woman, she developed an interest in the sport, which was also played by her husband. She was remembered as walking in the evenings to the Women's International Club with her cousin, Mrs Danton Obeysekera. The activity provided an opportunity for exercise and socialising outside the household.

Bandaranaike was also interested in reading and in the discussions taking place around her. From an early age she had taken an interest in the conversations of older relatives, particularly those concerning public affairs and the lives of people in the surrounding countryside. Her teachers remembered her as meticulous, orderly and serious. These qualities remained apparent in her adult life, when she was known for her careful attention to correspondence, household arrangements and personal instructions. Bandaranaike visited Buddhist sites including Anuradhapura and Mahiyangana, and climbed Sri Pada, a mountain that had fascinated her since childhood. She described trying to follow the Buddhist Middle Path in her personal conduct as well as in her public responsibilities. Her family later recalled that, during periods of uncertainty, she would withdraw to the shrine room at home to pray and seek guidance.

She also retained a particular appreciation for the produce and traditions of the places associated with her family. Her former official secretary, Bradman Weerakoon, recalled that she took considerable care over the selection of fruit served to guests at a state dinner in London. She arranged for mangosteens from Horagolla and rambutan and mangoes from Attanagalle to be brought from Sri Lanka. In a handwritten note, she specified the places from which the fruit should be collected and the varieties she wanted.

=== Health ===
Bandaranaike experienced increasing health difficulties during the later decades of her life, particularly affecting her feet and ability to walk. Her mobility gradually became restricted, and she eventually relied on a wheelchair for movement. Despite these physical limitations, she continued to take part in public and political activities for as long as her health permitted. She was mentally alert and capable of following political developments even when she could no longer move around independently. Bandaranaike developed a paralytic condition affecting her feet, which caused her toes to curl towards the soles. The condition substantially restricted her movement and meant that she had to be transported to official engagements in a wheelchair. She tried for treatment, but failed.

During the 1994 general election, ill health prevented her from taking an active part in campaigning, and her daughter, Chandrika, undertook much of the electioneering on behalf of the Sri Lanka Freedom Party. By the time Bandaranaike returned to the premiership in November 1994, she was using a wheelchair. Although she continued to attend official functions and perform constitutional responsibilities, her ability to move independently had become considerably restricted. In 1999, she was asked about her health and whether she intended to resign. She stated that she did not have high blood pressure, diabetes or high cholesterol, and insisted that her principal difficulty was with her feet. She explained that her physical condition did not affect her ability to think, and compared her continued public activity with that of Franklin D. Roosevelt, who had also used a wheelchair.

== Legacy and public image ==
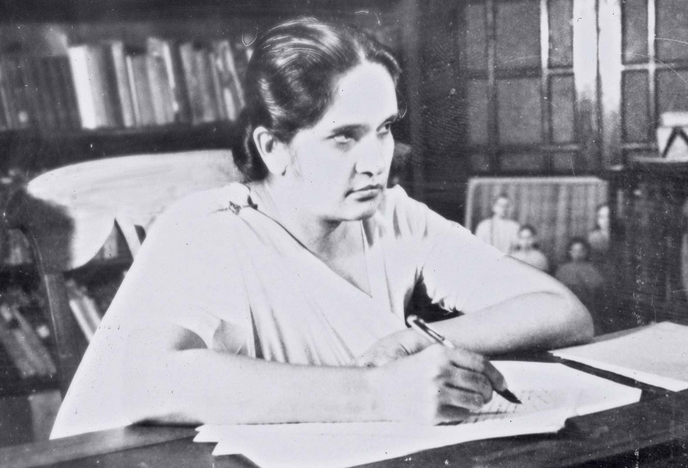
Sirimavo Bandaranaike in 1960

=== Political impact ===
At a time in history when the idea of a woman leading a country was almost unthinkable to the public, Bandaranaike helped raise the global perception of women's capabilities. In addition to her own contributions to Sri Lanka, her children became involved in the development of the country. All three children held nationally prominent positions; in addition to Anura and Chandrika's roles in government, Bandaranaike's daughter Sunetra worked as her political secretary in the 1970s and later became a philanthropist. The Bandaranaike marriage helped break down social barriers in Sri Lanka over the years, through the Socialist policies they enacted.

During her three terms in office, Bandaranaike led the country away from its colonial past and into its political independence as a republic. Implementing socialist policies during the Cold War, she attempted to nationalise key sectors of the economy and undertake land reforms to benefit the native population, desiring to end the political favouritism enjoyed by the Western-educated elites. A major goal of her policies was to reduce the ethnic and socio-economic disparities in the country. As one of the founders of the Non-Aligned Movement, Bandaranaike brought Sri Lanka to prominence among the nations which sought to remain neutral to the influence of the superpowers. She worked to forge alliances between the countries in the Global South, and sought to resolve issues diplomatically, opposing nuclear expansion.

At the height of her political influence, Bandaranaike was treated with considerable deference by some supporters and officials. Accounts from the period describe sycophantic behaviour, with some individuals prostrating themselves before her or touching her feet, while officials were reported to withdraw backwards from her presence and address her in a manner associated with royalty. Senior defence officials were also reported to carry her luggage during official trips. On one occasion, women from a socially disadvantaged caste reportedly offered their hair as a carpet for her to walk upon, although Bandaranaike declined the gesture.

Bandaranaike's ideology combined socialist economic policies, Sinhalese Buddhist nationalism and anti-colonialism. It was strongly connected to the political legacy of her husband. After his death, she continued his policies after becoming prime minister in 1960, including further nationalisation and expansion of state control. During her second term from 1970 to 1977, she expanded upon her husband's programme, with her United Front government pursuing more extensive socialist measures than previous Sri Lankan governments were able to achieve.

Despite Bandaranaike's notability as the world's first woman prime minister, political scholars have commented that Bandaranaike was symbolically powerful, but ultimately had little impact on women's political representation in Sri Lanka. Although Bandaranaike expressed pride in her status as a woman leader, considering herself a "Mother of the People", she did not place much personal or political emphasis on women's issues, and her election as prime minister did not significantly increase the number of women in Sri Lankan politics. Her appointment of the first woman minister, Siva Obeyesekere, to the Sri Lankan Cabinet in 1976, was less than revolutionary due to the fact that Obeyesekere was a relative of Bandaranaike's. That appointment followed a pattern of Bandaranaike appointing family members to high government positions.

By 1994, even though Bandaranaike and her daughter Kumaratunga held the top political positions of prime minister and president, Sri Lanka continued to have some of the lowest political participation rates for women out of any Asian country. In 2010, on the 50th anniversary of Bandaranaike's election as the world's first female prime minister, Sri Lankan parliamentarian Rosy Senanayake told the press that Sri Lanka had not made significant progress towards gender equality in politics: only 4.5 per cent of parliamentarians were women. Senanayake had earlier called for a "special quota" to achieve better gender representation: such a quota, reserving 25% of all legislative seats for women, was passed in 2016.

=== Reputation ===
The Bandaranaike family has played a prominent role in Sri Lankan politics for several decades. Sirimavo Bandaranaike herself accumulated more than 17 years as prime minister across three non-consecutive terms in office. The family's successive leadership roles made it one of the most influential political dynasties in the country's modern history. Former Sri Lankan President Maithripala Sirisena praised the Bandaranaike family, stating that they had not engaged in theft, dishonesty or corruption during their political service to the country.

"Mrs. Bandaranaike's appointment opened doors for "thousands of women across the globe to follow her footsteps."

— A statement issued by Visaka Dharmadasa (Chairperson of Association of War Affected Women)

The concentration of political power within the Bandaranaike family has been described by some commentators as resembling an Oligarchy. During the 1990s, Chandrika Kumaratunga served as president, Bandaranaike served as prime minister, and Bandaranaike's son Anura Bandaranaike later became Speaker of the Parliament. However, one assessment of the family characterised its members as fundamentally democratic and liberal in their outlook, noting that Anura Bandaranaike was regarded as an effective Speaker and that the family generally respected parliamentary institutions and procedures.

Singaporean Prime Minister Lee Kuan Yew described Bandaranaike as a tougher and more determined leader than her husband, noting that she was less voluble in her public manner.

In 2010, Bandaranaike's daughter, former President Chandrika Kumaratunga, credited her mother with raising Sri Lanka's international profile through her leadership of the Non-Aligned Movement and participation in international negotiations. She also identified Bandaranaike's efforts to strengthen democracy in Sri Lanka as a central part of her legacy. Kumaratunga stated below:

"She was a very sincere and strong democrat. At no point in her political career did she condone any anti-democratic actions."

=== Public image ===
Bandaranaike developed a distinctive public image through her dress and hairstyle. She frequently wore the traditional Sri Lankan osariya, paired with a tightly styled sinhalese bun. Her hair was typically arranged in an impeccably neat low bun, often in the form of a double bun or kondé, positioned at the nape of her neck. The combination became closely associated with her public appearance and contributed to the visual image by which she was recognised both in Sri Lanka and abroad.

=== Memorials and commemorations ===
In 1998, the Sirimavo Bandaranaike Memorial Exhibition Centre was constructed on the grounds of the Bandaranaike Memorial International Conference Hall (BMICH) as a gift from China. The BMICH complex also houses the Bandaranaike Museum, which contains personal artefacts belonging to S. W. R. D. Bandaranaike and Sirimavo Bandaranaike. Originally commissioned in 1973 following the completion of the BMICH, the museum was expanded in 2005 to include additional artefacts relating to Mrs Bandaranaike, who had died five years earlier.

In August 1976, the Sri Lanka Postal Department issued a commemorative stamp series honouring Bandaranaike and her role as chair of the Fifth Summit of the Non-Aligned Movement, held in Colombo. In 1995, Sri Lanka Post issued a commemorative definitive stamp bearing a portrait of Bandaranaike during her tenure as prime minister. In 2016, Sri Lanka Post issued a commemorative stamp with a face value of Rs. 15 to mark the centenary of Bandaranaike's birth.

== Titles, awards and honours ==
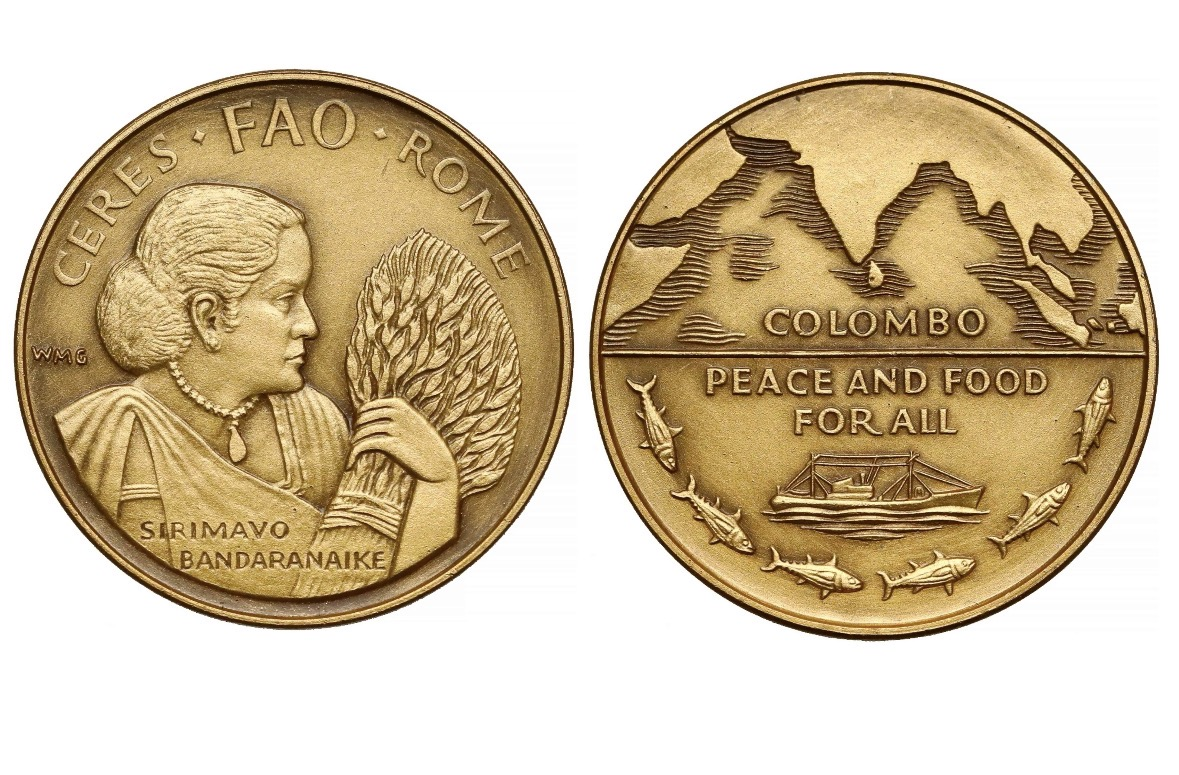
The Ceres Medal awarded to Bandaranaike by the Food and Agriculture Organization in 1977, depicting her portrait on the obverse and Colombo on the reverse.

The title "Mathini" became closely associated with Bandaranaike from the beginning of her premiership. A Sri Lankan account of her political career describes members of the public addressing her as "Mathini" following her appointment as prime minister in July, 1960. According to another Sri Lankan account, crowds gathered outside Queen's House after Bandaranaike became prime minister and they addressed her as "Mathini" when she appeared before them. She would continue to have this title throughout her later political life.

Established on 1 January 1973, Stanmore Crescent Primary School was renamed Sirimavo Bandaranaike Vidyalaya in December of the same year in honour of Prime Minister Sirimavo Bandaranaike.

In 1977, the Food and Agriculture Organisation (FAO), recognising Bandaranaike's contribution to food self-sufficiency in Sri Lanka, awarded her the Ceres Medal. FAO director-general Edouard Saouma presented the medal, named after the Roman goddess of agriculture, at a ceremony in Colombo. Saouma praised Bandaranaike's leadership and policies on agricultural development, particularly her efforts on behalf of disadvantaged communities in the developing world, stating that he could "think of no one who, by her actions on behalf of the needy, is more worthy to represent all that is symbolised by Ceres."

In 2005, The Sirimavo Bandaranaike Specialized Children's Hospital in Kandy was opened and named in honour of Bandaranaike. The hospital provides specialised medical care for children in the Kandy region, addressing the need for dedicated paediatric healthcare services.

== In popular culture ==
In 2023, a documentary film chronicling her life story, titled Our Mother, Grandmother, Prime Minister: Sirimavo, was released. It won Best Documentary at the 21st Dhaka International Film Festival.

== Notes ==
Political offices
Preceded by Dudley Senanayake	Prime Minister of Ceylon; 1960–1965	Succeeded by Dudley Senanayake
Preceded by Dudley Senanayake	Prime Minister of Sri Lanka; 1970–1977	Succeeded by Junius Jayewardene
Preceded by Chandrika Kumaratunga	Prime Minister of Sri Lanka; 1994–2000	Succeeded by Ratnasiri Wickremanayake
