= Ceylon Citizenship Act =

1948 Act of the Parliament of Sri Lanka

The Ceylon Citizenship Act No. 18 of 1948 was a controversial law passed by the Ceylon Parliament which did not grant citizenship to Indian Tamils, who were 11% of the population.

== Background ==
During the 19th and early 20th centuries the British rulers of Ceylon recruited large numbers of South Indians, primarily Indian Tamils, to work in tea, coffee, rubber and coconut plantations in Ceylon. By 1946 their numbers had grown to 780,000, 11.7% of the population. Their presence was resented by Sinhalese nationalists. There was real fear amongst the Indian Tamils that once Ceylon obtained independence, the Sinhalese, who constituted 69.4% of the population, would take steps to remove them from the country.

== The Bill ==
Shortly after independence on 4 February 1948 the new Sinhalese dominated government of Ceylon introduced the Ceylon Citizenship Bill before Parliament. The outward purpose of the Bill was to provide means of obtaining citizenship, but its real purpose was to discriminate against the Indian Tamils by denying them citizenship. The Bill stipulated that anyone wishing to obtain citizenship had to prove that their father was born in Ceylon i.e. that they were at least third generation immigrants. This was an impossible task for most Indian Tamils. Few were at least third generation immigrants because they tended to return to India to give birth. Those who were at least third-generation immigrants rarely had the necessary documents because they rarely registered births. Therefore, they could not prove the requirements for citizenship.

The Bill was opposed fiercely in Parliament by the Ceylon Indian Congress, which represented the Indian Tamils, and the Sinhalese leftist parties. The bill was also opposed by the All Ceylon Tamil Congress, which represented the Sri Lankan Tamils, including its leader G.G. Ponnambalam.

The Bill was passed by Parliament on 20 August 1948 and became law on 15 November 1948, just 285 days after Ceylon had gained independence from Britain. Only about 5,000 Indian Tamils qualified for citizenship. More than 700,000 people, about 11% of the population, were denied citizenship and made stateless.

== Aftermath ==
In 1949 the Ceylon Parliament passed a different subsequent act called Indian and Pakistani Residents (Citizenship) Act No.3 of 1949 whose outward purpose, again, was to provide means of obtaining citizenship for the Indian Tamils. But in reality the conditions imposed by the Act were such that they discriminated against the Indian Tamils. The Act granted citizenship to anyone who had 10 years of uninterrupted residence in Ceylon (7 years for married persons) and whose income was above the stipulated level. Again, this was an impossible task for most Indian Tamils. They had a habit of periodically returning to India, thereby interrupting their residence in Ceylon, and most could not meet the income qualification. Only about 100,000 Indian Tamils qualified for citizenship under this Act.

Later in 1949 the Ceylon Parliament passed the Ceylon (Parliamentary Elections) Amendment Act No.48 of 1949 which stripped the Indian Tamils of their franchise. Seven of the 95 MPs elected at the 1947 general elections were Indian Tamils. Upcountry Indian Tamils influenced the result in 20 other constituencies, very often voting for the opposition Sinhalese leftist parties. None of the 95 MPs elected at the 1952 general elections were Upcountry Indian Tamils.

On 18 January 1954 Indian Prime Minister Jawaharlal Nehru and Ceylon Prime Minister John Kotelawala signed the Nehru-Kotelawala Pact under which India agreed to the repatriation of any Indian Tamil who wanted Indian citizenship. But India refused to automatically provide Indian citizenship to those who did not qualify for Ceylon citizenship.

On 30 October 1964 Indian Prime Minister Lal Shastri and Ceylon Prime Minister Sirimavo Bandaranaike signed the Sirima-Shastri Pact (also known as the Indo-Ceylon Agreement) under which India agreed to the repatriation of 525,000 Indian Tamils. Another 300,000 would be offered Ceylon citizenship. The fate of the remaining 150,000 Indian Tamils would be decided later.

On 28 June 1974 Indian Prime Minister Indira Gandhi and Ceylon Prime Minister Sirimavo Bandaranaike signed the Sirimavo-Gandhi Pact under which India and Sri Lanka agreed to grant citizenship to the 150,000 Indian Tamils whose status was left unresolved by the Sirima-Shastri Pact.

In 1982 India abrogated the Sirima-Shastri Pact and Sirimavo-Gandhi Pact. At this point 90,000 Indian Tamils who had been granted Indian citizenship were still in Sri Lanka and another 86,000 were in the process of applying for Indian citizenship.

In 1988 the Sri Lankan Parliament passed the Grant of Citizenship to Stateless Persons Act which granted Sri Lankan citizenship to all Indian Tamils who hadn't applied for Indian citizenship under previous agreements.

On 7 October 2003 the Sri Lankan Parliament unanimously passed the Grant of Citizenship to Persons of Indian Origin Act No.35 of 2003 which granted Sri Lankan citizenship to all Indian Tamils who had been residing in Sri Lanka since October 1964 and their descendants. This amounted to 168,141 persons and included those who had been granted Indian citizenship under previous agreements but were still living in Sri Lanka, though they had to rescind their Indian citizenship. All Indian Tamils living in Sri Lanka had finally been granted Sri Lankan citizenship, 55 years after independence.

== See also ==
- Sri Lankan nationality law
