= Kaduwela =

Kaduwela may refer to:

- Kaduwela, Western Province, Sri Lanka
- Kaduwela, Central Province, Sri Lanka
- Kaduwela Divisional Secretariat, Western Province, Sri Lanka
- Kaduwela Electoral District, Sri Lanka, in existence from 1977 to 1989
