= Poruwadanda West Grama Niladhari Division =

Poruwadanda West
- Grama Niladhari Division
- Interactive map of Poruwadanda West
- Coordinates: 6.724022°N 80.114986°E
- Country: Sri Lanka
- Province: Western Province
- District: Kalutara District
- Divisional Secretariat: Ingiriya Divisional Secretariat
- Electoral District: Kalutara Electoral District
- Polling Division: Horana Polling Division

Area
  - Total: 3.45 km^{2} (1.33 sq mi)
- Elevation: 12 m (39 ft)

Population (2012)
  - Total: 3,094
  - Density: 897/km^{2} (2,320/sq mi)
- ISO 3166 code: LK-1310125

Poruwadanda West

Poruwadanda West Grama Niladhari Division is a Grama Niladhari Division of the Ingiriya Divisional Secretariat of Kalutara District of Western Province, Sri Lanka . It has Grama Niladhari Division Code 618C.

Poruwadanda West is a surrounded by the Poruwadanda East, Wagawatta, Ilimba, Gurugoda and Rathmalgoda West Grama Niladhari Divisions.

== Demographics ==
=== Ethnicity ===
The Poruwadanda West Grama Niladhari Division has a Sinhalese majority (70.6%) and a significant Indian Tamil population (21.6%) . In comparison, the Ingiriya Divisional Secretariat (which contains the Poruwadanda West Grama Niladhari Division) has a Sinhalese majority (89.8%)

Ethnicity in Poruwadanda West
1. Sinhalese (70.6%)
2. Indian Tamil (21.6%)
3. Sri Lankan Tamil (7.80%)
4. Other (0.00%)

=== Religion ===
The Poruwadanda West Grama Niladhari Division has a Buddhist majority (70.4%) and a significant Hindu population (23.4%) . In comparison, the Ingiriya Divisional Secretariat (which contains the Poruwadanda West Grama Niladhari Division) has a Buddhist majority (89.4%)

Religion in Poruwadanda West
1. Buddhist (70.4%)
2. Hindu (23.4%)
3. Other Christian (3.70%)
4. Roman Catholic (2.40%)
5. Other (0.00%)
