= Ingiriya =

Ingiriya ඉංගිරිය இங்கிரிய
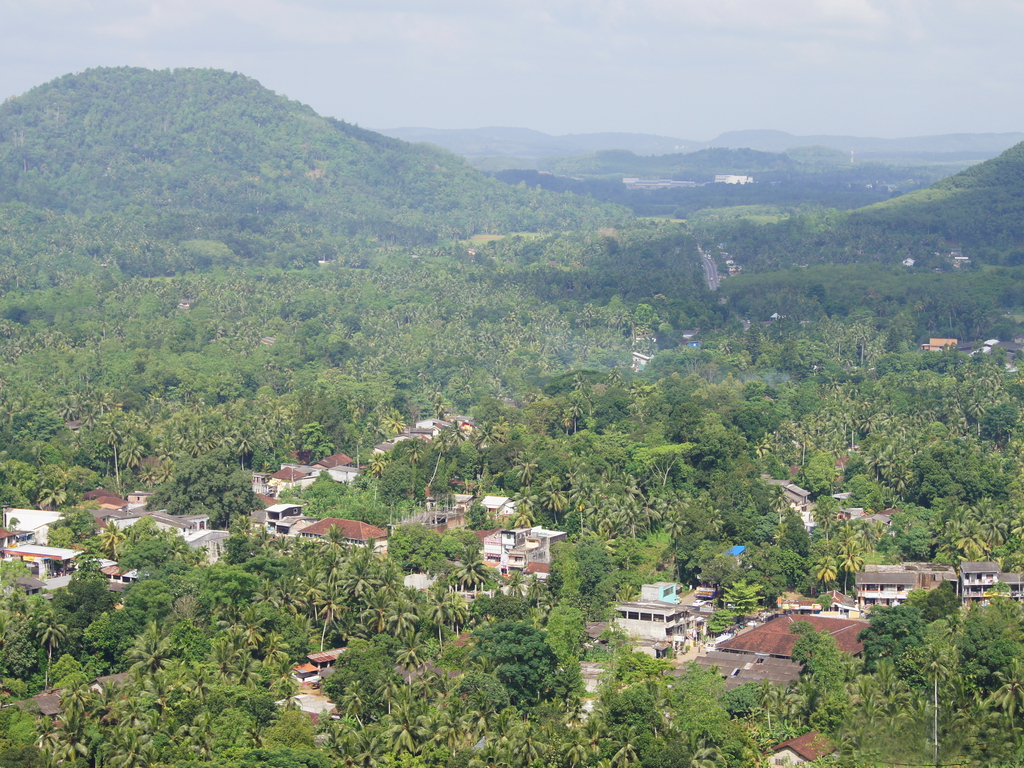
- Ingiriya

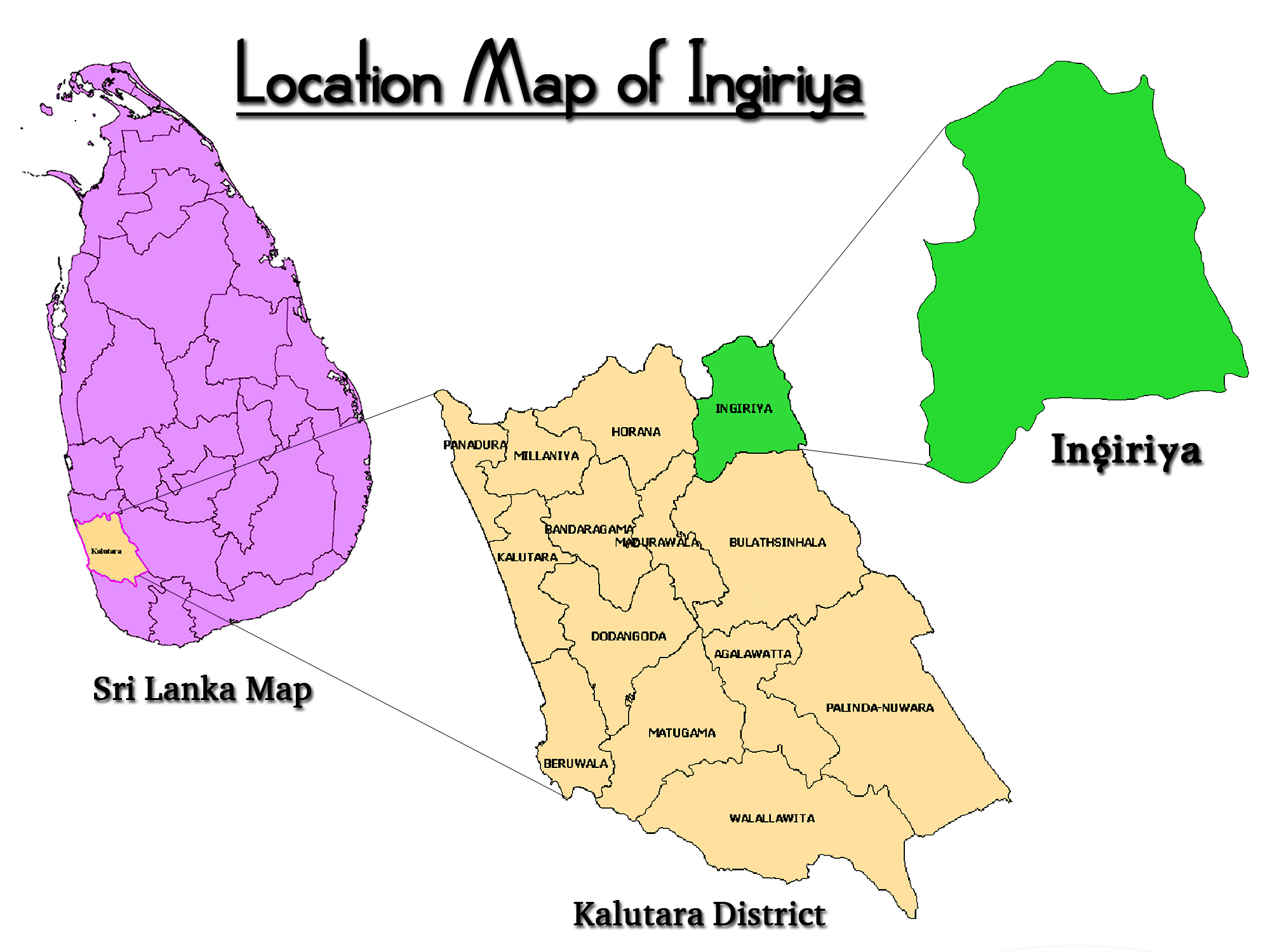
- Ingiriya Location Map

- Location within Sri Lanka
- Coordinates: 6°44′38″N 80°10′20″E
- Country: Sri Lanka
- Province: Western Province
- District: Kalutara District

Government
  - Electoral Division: Horana Polling Division
  - Local Government: Horana Pradeshiya Sabha
  - Divisional Secretariat: Ingiriya Divisional Secretariat
- Elevation: 137 m (449 ft)

Population (2017)
  - Total: 56,074
  - Density: 252.66/km^{2} (654.4/sq mi)
- Time zone: UTC+05:30 (SLT)
- Postal Code: 12440
- Telephone code: 0094-3422 XXXXX
- Website: www.ingiriyacity.lk

Ingiriya (Sinhala: ඉංගිරිය; Tamil: இங்கிரிய) is a city in Kalutara District of Western Province, Sri Lanka, near the border with Sabaragamuwa Province. The city is the meeting point of the Rathnapura–Panadura, Ingiriya–Padukka and Ingiriya–Bulathsinhala roads.

The city has an ethnic makeup of 89.7% Sinhalese and 10.1% Tamils, with less than 1% from other ethnicity. The 2001 census recorded a population of 45,726, rising to 56,074 in 2017.

== Location ==
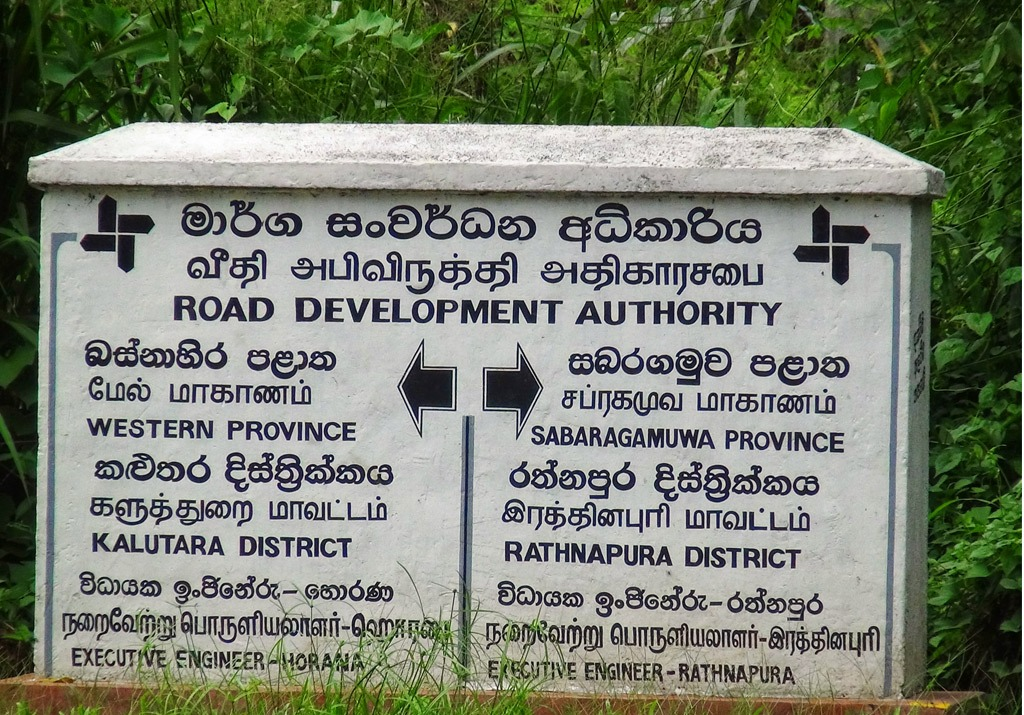
Ingiriya Boundary Marker

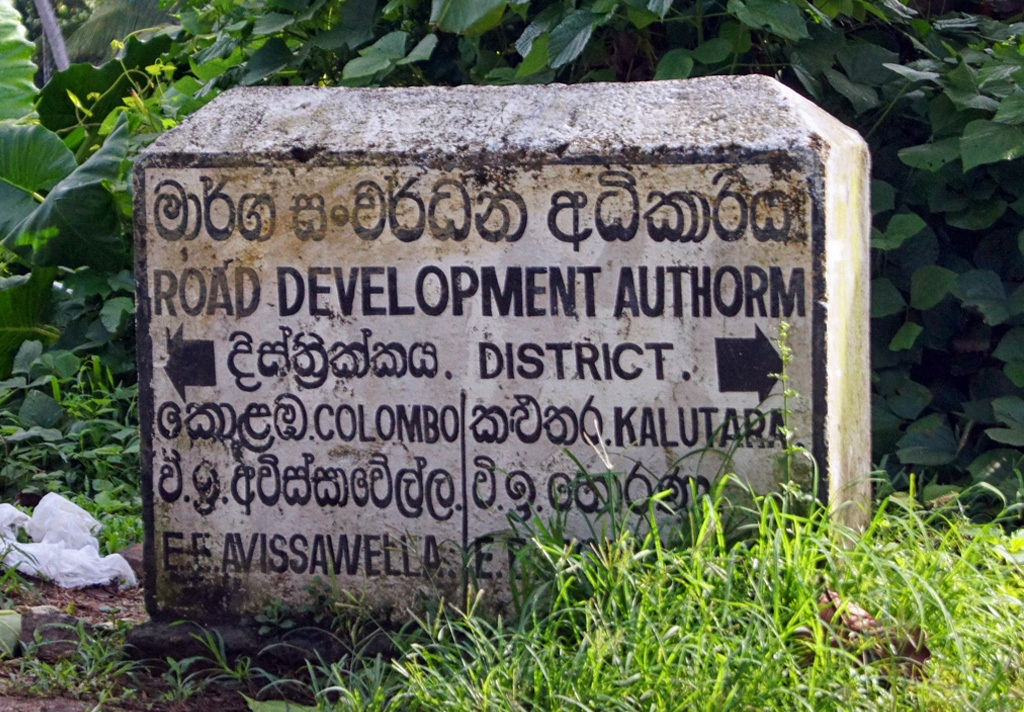
Ingiriya Boundary Marker

Ingiriya can be accessed via the A8 (Rathnapura–Panadura) highway (33 km from Panadura, 35.8 km from Rathnapura), by the Padukka–Ingiriya Road (16.80 km from Padukka, 18.20 km from Meepe) or by the Egaloya–Ingiriya Road (11 km from Egaloya), or by the Handapangoda-Ingiriya Road. Ingiriya is one of the borders of Kalutara District and Western Province. Ellagawa, the next town after Ingiriya towards Rathnapura, belongs to Ratnapura District, Sabaragamuwa Province, and Padukka, the next town after Ingiriya towards the Padukka side, belongs to Colombo District.

== Geography ==
Ingiriya is 24 km (15 mi) from the coast and extends a further 8.8 km (5.5 mi) inland. It is mountainous, especially near the eastern border. The highest point is Madakada Giranchi Mountain, 355 m (1,165 ft) high. Eduragala Mountain is also over 210 m (690 ft) high. The eastern part contains scattered mountains over 150 m (490 ft) high. There are some similarly high mountains in the western part. Overall, 60% of the area is flat plains. The Kalu River flows along the southern border of Ingiriya and many streams flow into the Kalu River. The largest, Nambapana Stream, is in the east. Another river, the Mawak Oya, starts in the north and flows along the west side before connecting to the Kalu River in the south.

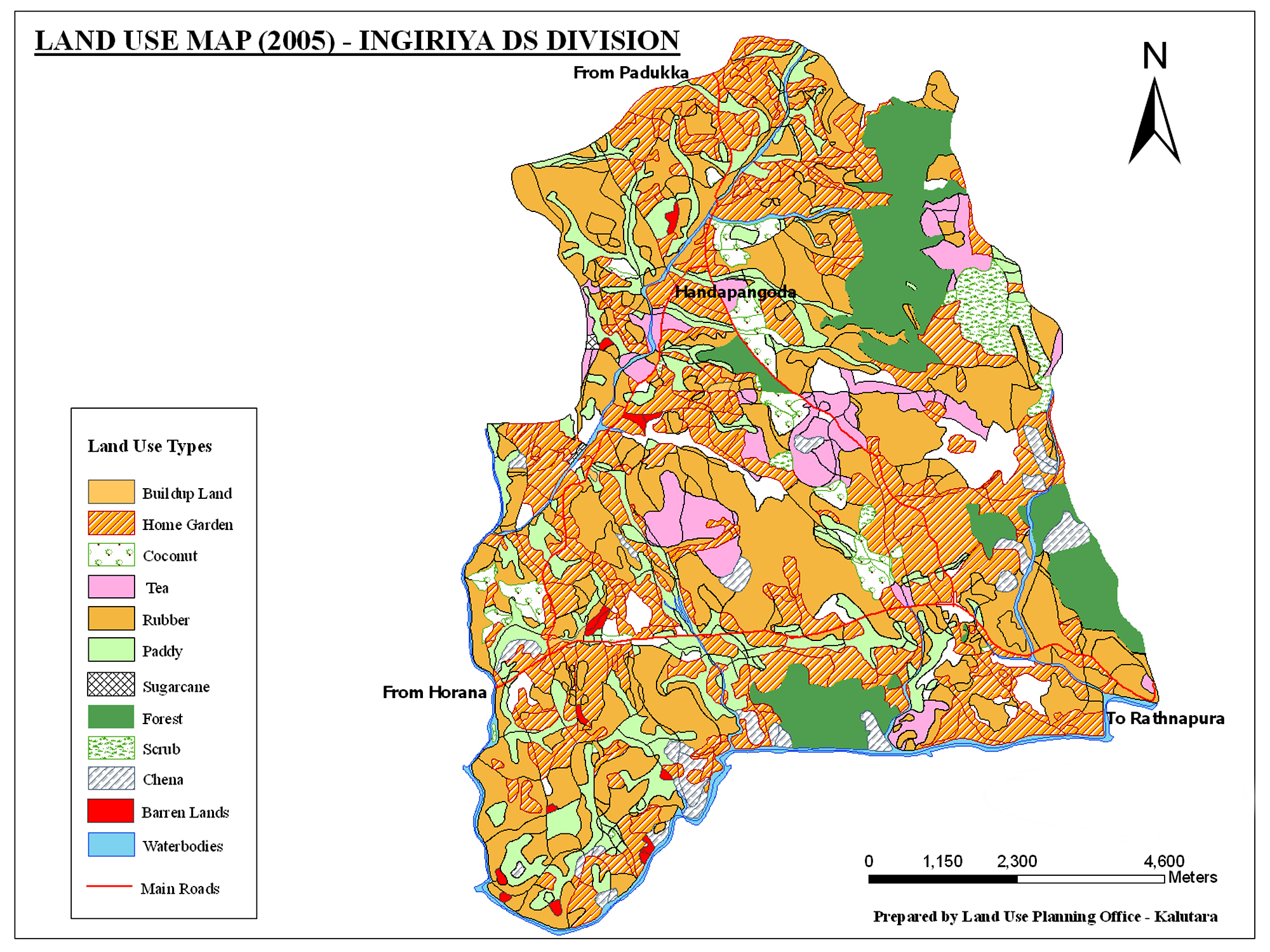
Ingiriya Land Use

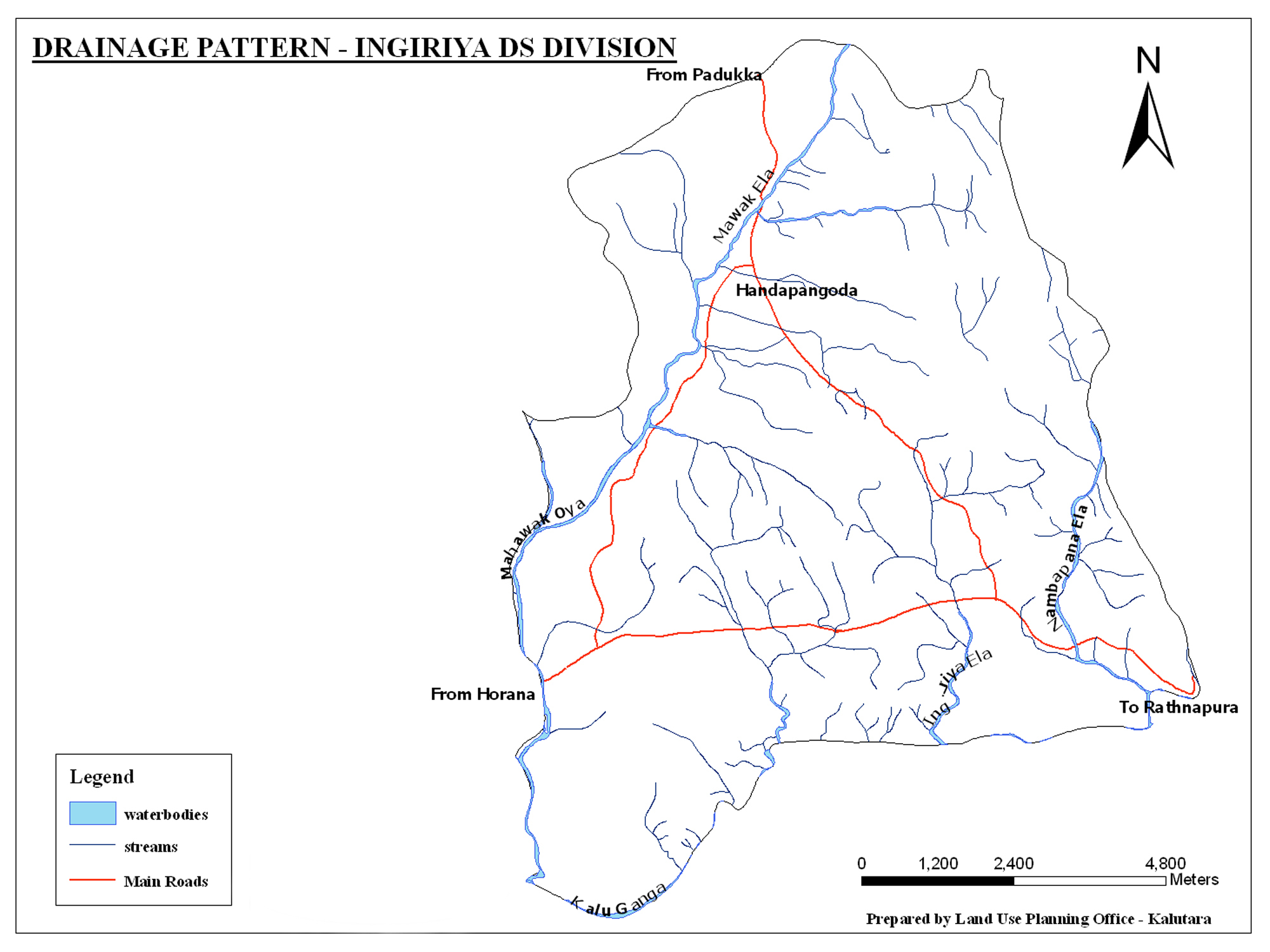
Ingiriya drainage

Land Use	Area (km^{2})	Percentage %
Home garden	2293	29%
Tea plantation	582.81	06%
Rubber plantation	3067.49	33%
Coconut plantation	348.97	04%
Paddy plantation	1132.32	12%
Other plantations	278.78	03%
Forest	801.64	09%
Scrub	157.38	02%
Water bodies	123.88	01%
Other land	416.84	5%
Total	9204	100%

=== Climate ===
Ingiriya falls within the Low Country Wet Zone and has a medium climate, with 3,500 mm (140 in) to 4,500 mm (180 in) of annual rainfall, coming from both east–west monsoons (mid-November to January) and southwest monsoons (mid-May to mid-September).

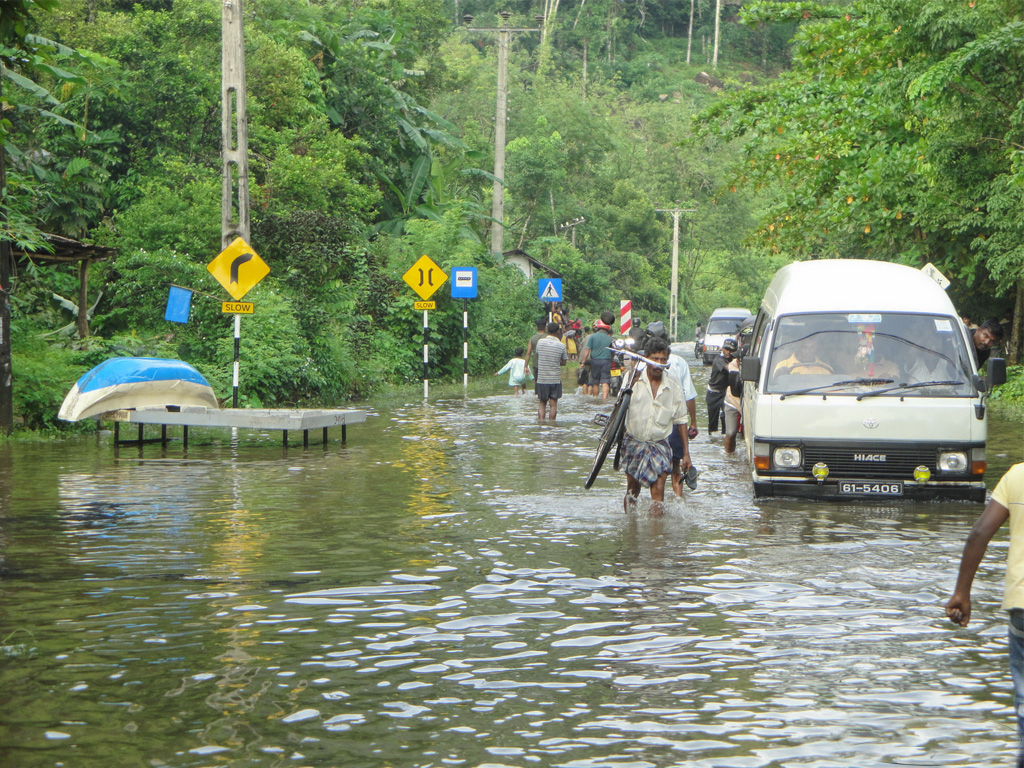
Flooding in Nambapana

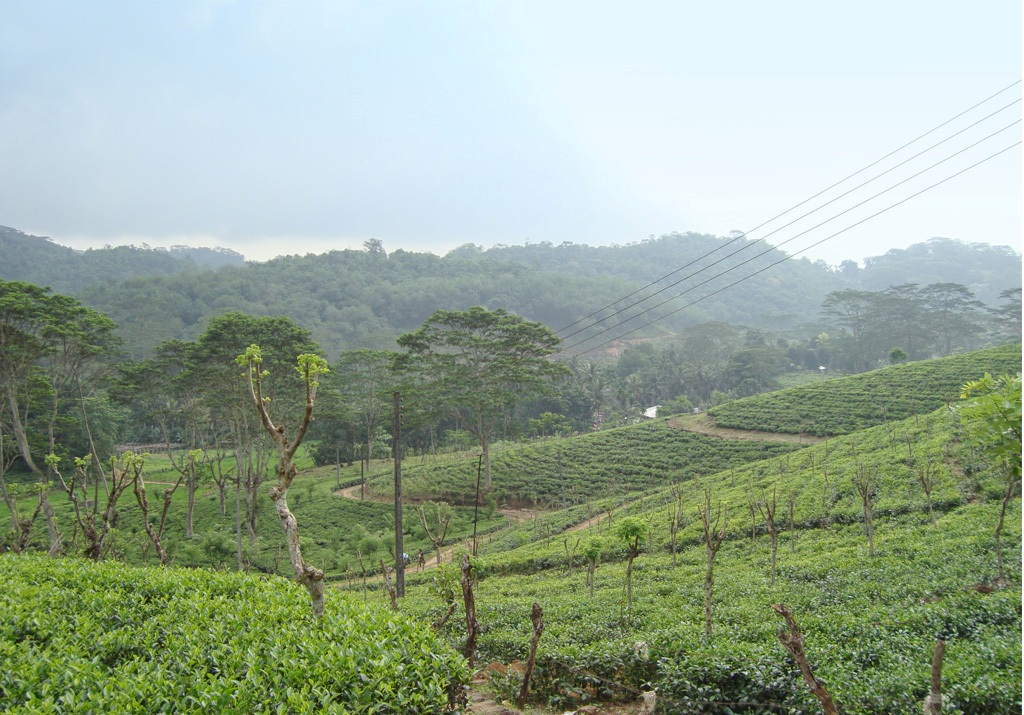
Raigam Tea Estate

Month	Rainfall in mm	Days with rain	Average temperature in °C
January	96	03	27.2
February	487	11	27.8
March	275	10	28.3
April	465	19	28.3
May	152	10	27.9
June	323	23	27.3
July	158	07	27.1
August	386	18	27.1
September	381	16	27.0
October	914	19	27.1
November	470	10	27.1
December	482	15	27.1
Annual	4589	161	27.5

=== Flooding ===
Ingiriya is prone to flooding. The Kalu River overflows into the areas of Nambapana, Eastern and Western Urugala, Western Ingiriya town, Wagawatta, Kekulaliya, Western Poruwadanda and Dombagaskanda.

=== Agriculture ===
Ingiriya belongs to the Low Country Wet Agricultural Zone, so the land and climate is very suitable for cultivation. Tea, rubber, coconut and rice are the main cash crops. As of 2009 there are 5039 acres of rubber plantation, 1569 acres of tea plantation, 1500 acres of coconut plantation and 22 acres of rice paddies.

== Administration ==
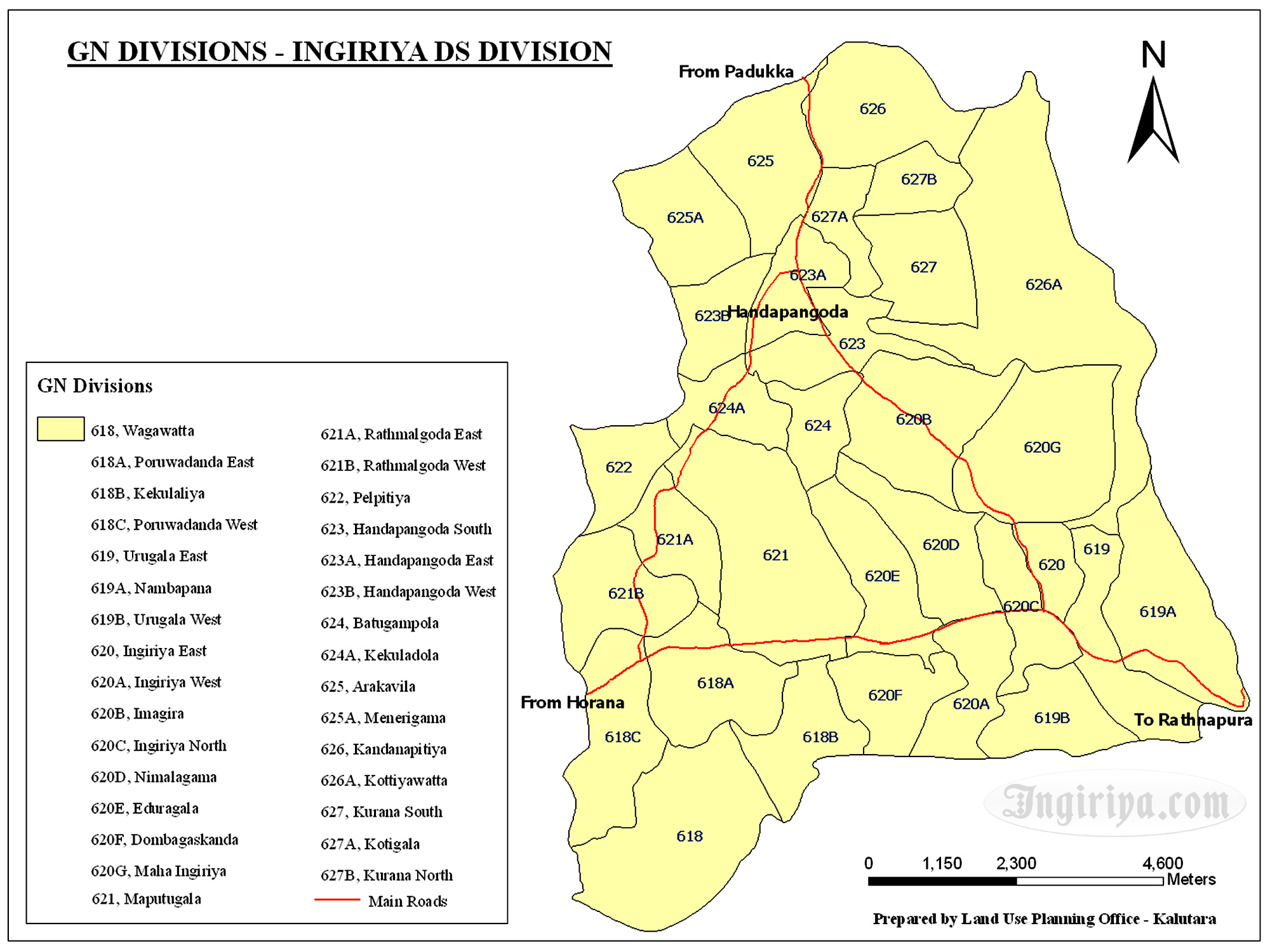
Grama Niladhari Divisions

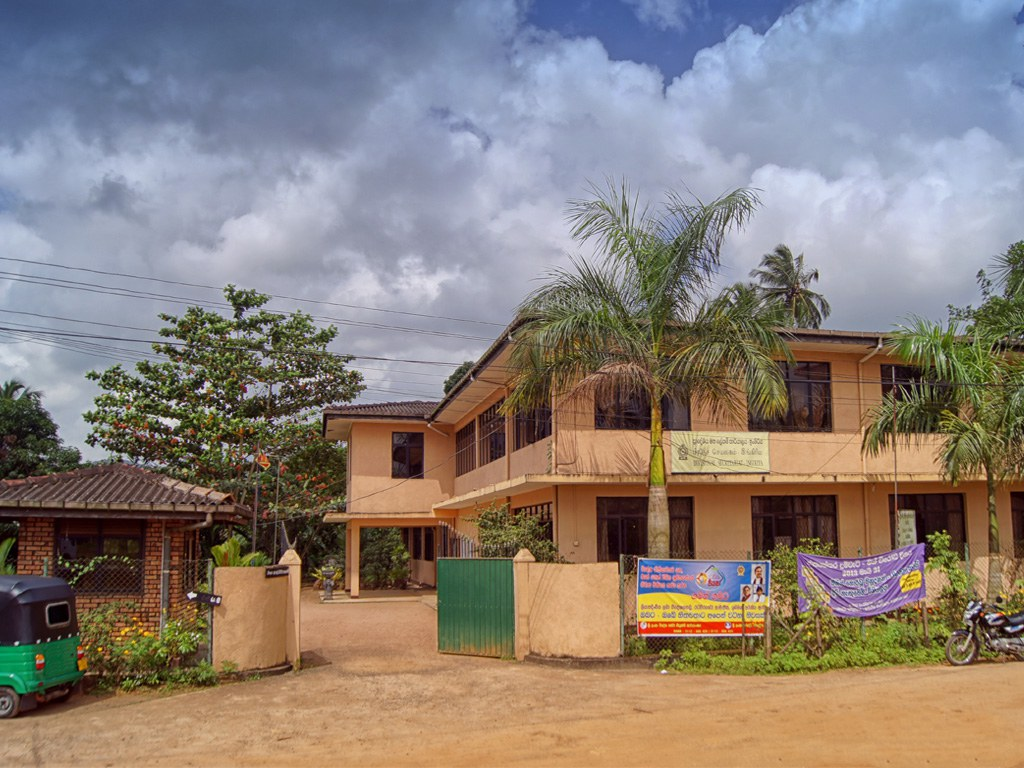
Ingiriya Divisional Secretariat

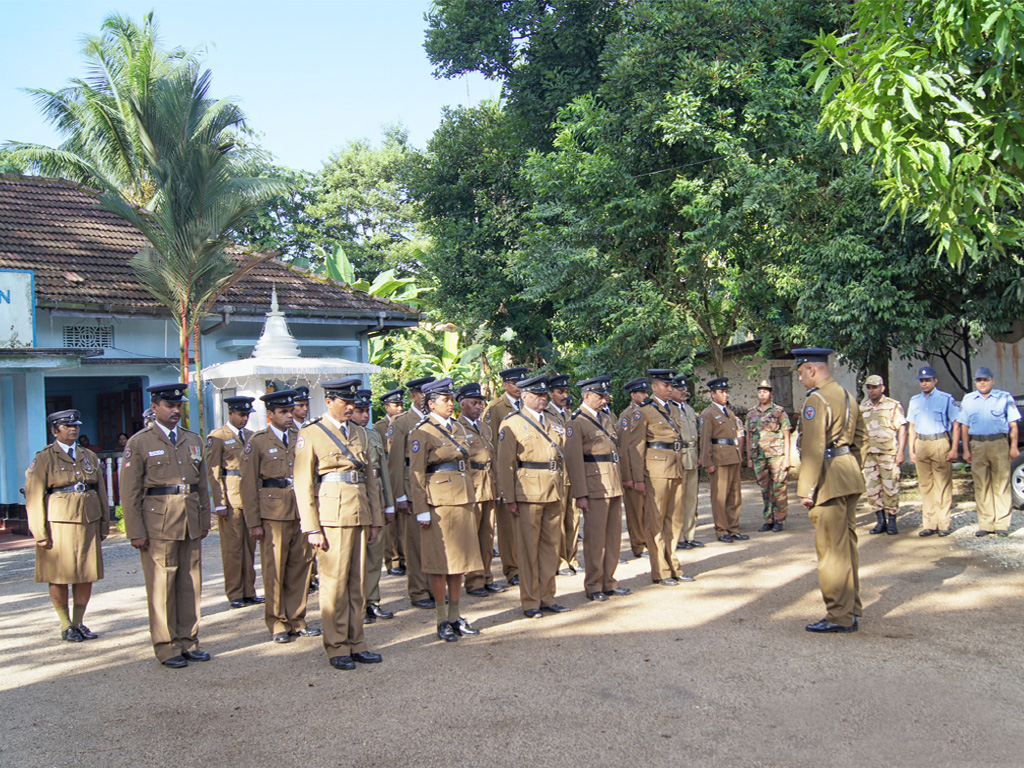
Ingiriya Police Station

Ingiriya city, which is administered by the Horana Pradeshiya Sabha (Divisional Council), is a part of the Horana Polling Division. Notable government institutions in Ingiriya include:

- Ingiriya Divisional Secretariat
- Ingiriya Police Station
- Ingiriya District Hospital
- Ingiriya Medical Officer of Health
- Agrarian Services Center - Ingiriya
- Ingiriya Post Office
- Ingiriya Co-operative Services
- District Office of Ayurvedic Community Medical Health and Ayurvedic Central Dispensary
- Ceylon Electricity Board Ingiriya
- Horana Pradeshiya Sabha Ingiriya Sub Office
- Veterinary Office Ingiriya

The Ingiriya Divisional Secretariat office is the main administration institute managing Ingiriya City. Ingiriya was formerly a part of the Horana Divisional Secretariat. On August 14, 2000, 31 Grama Niladhari divisions were divided and assigned to Ingiriya Divisional Secretariat. This change occurred due to the large size of Horana division and the growth of the population.

Government health services and preventive medicine in Ingiriya are supplied by the Ingiriya Medical Officer of Health office and by Ingiriya District Hospital. Ingiriya Police Station, which was started in 1948, plays the major role in security. Agrarian Services center is located in Colombo road, nearby Cenema hall. The main post office is an A grade Post Office. Other post offices are situated in surrounding areas. There is a fuel station run by Ingiriya Co-Operative Office and two private fuel stations at Handapangoda and Eduragala.

== Transportation ==
Ingiriya is located along the Panadura and Rathnapura A8 Road. There are two bus stands in Ingiriya. All the buses that travel along A8 road park at the new bus stand. All other buses park at the old bus stand along Ingiriya–Padukka Road.

== Landmarks ==
=== Nachchimale ===
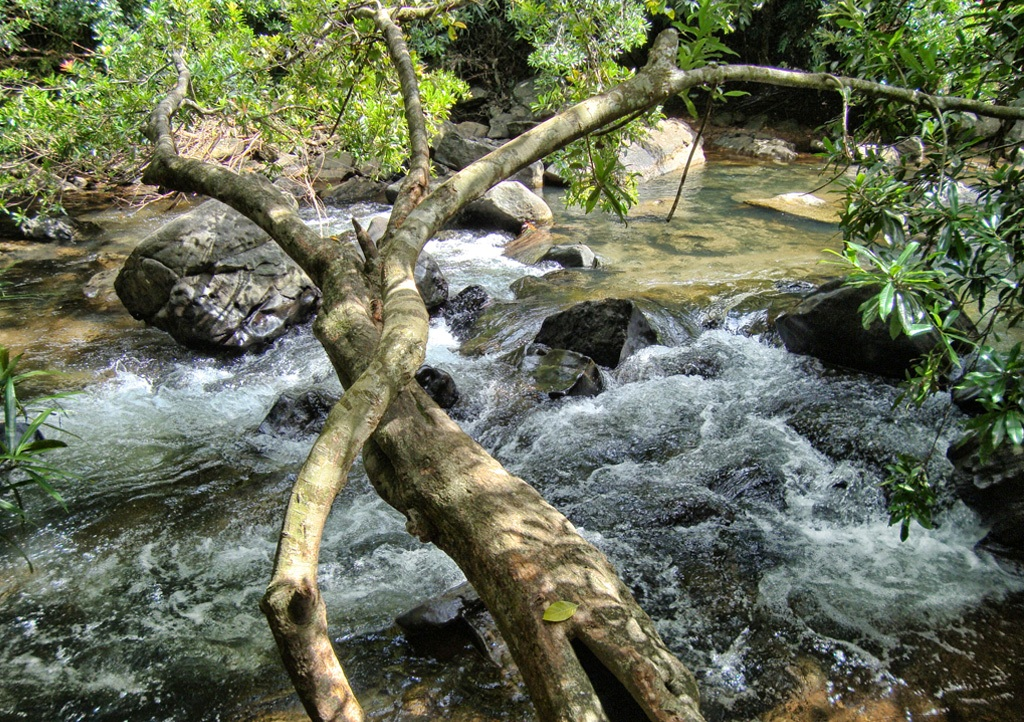
Nachchimale

Nachchimale (නාච්චිමලේ) is the most famous area of Ingiriya. It is reached by traveling about 1 mile (1.6 km) towards Padukka from Ingiriya. The Nachchimale port is a part of Nambapana Lake. Waterfalls and stone holes filled with clear water are a common scene. Thousands of foreigners and local visitors come to visit Nachchimale to bathe and have fun. However, this can lead to litter being strewn about. This has been a major problem to the environment and the residents.

=== Madakada Aranya Senasanaya ===
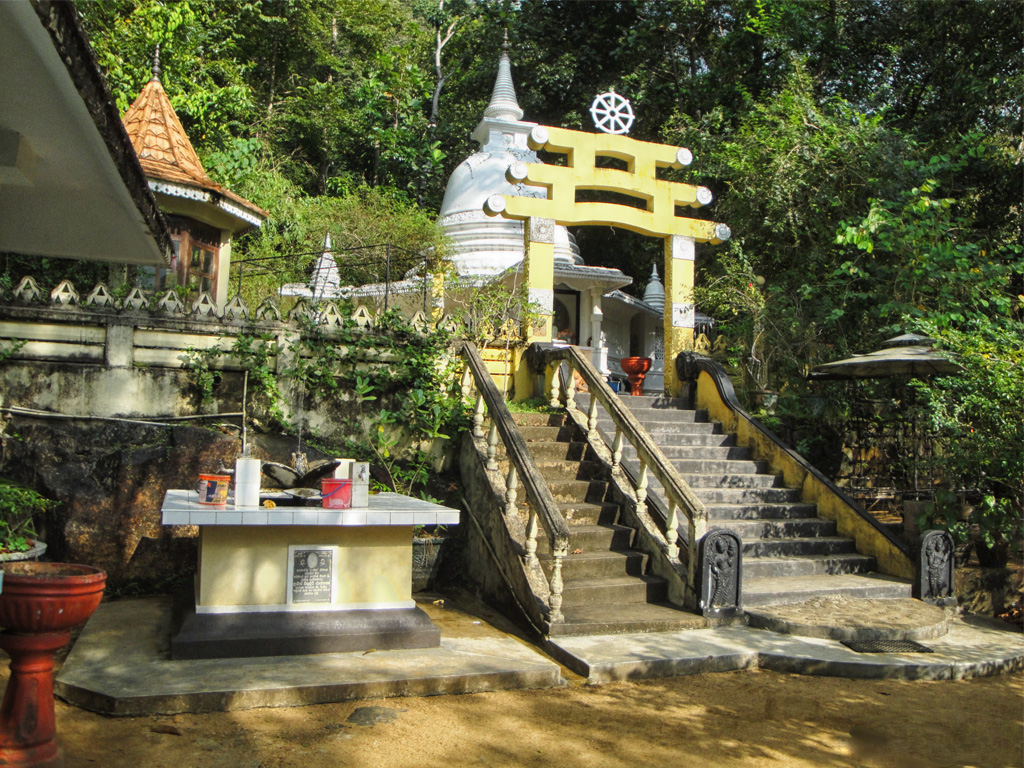
Madakada Aranya Senasanaya

Madakada Aranya Senasanaya is a monastery located about 1 mile (1.6 km) towards Padukka from Ingiriya. The history of this monastery goes back to 1940, when there were over 100 meditative monks living there. The new monastery was built by Rev. Ranwala Saddhatissa Thero in 1948. In ancient times, this area was a forest with caves. After the arrival of Saddahtissa Thero for his meditations, it became a forest monastery.

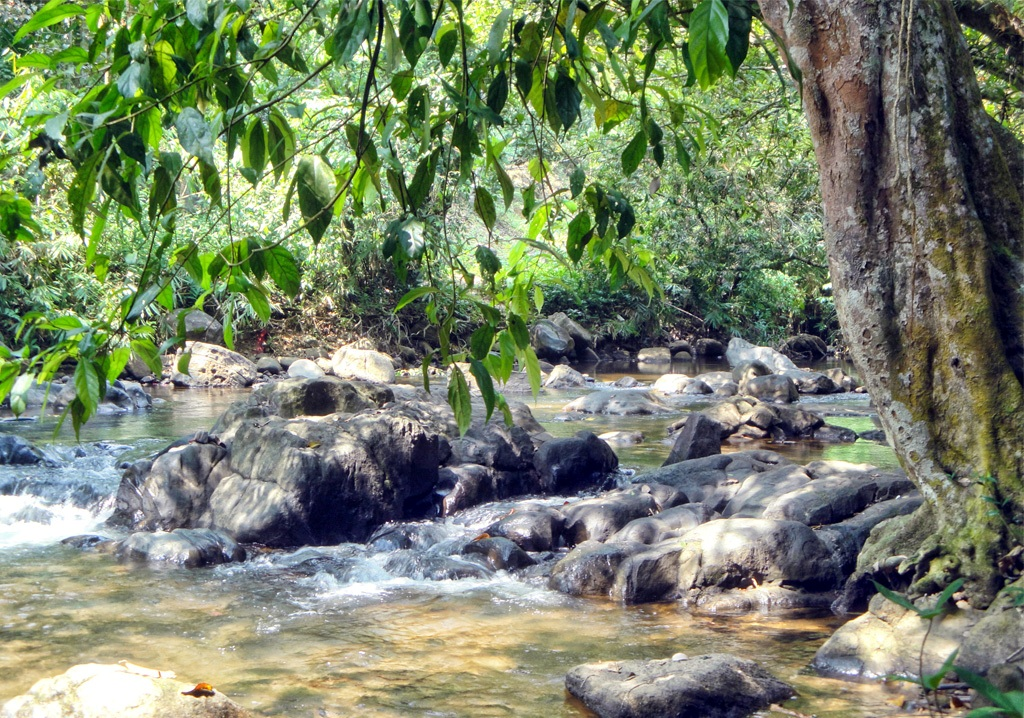
Parevi Thota

Madakada Aranya is one of the premier Vipassana meditation centers in the country. It has branches in places such as Navinna and Salgala. Presently, there are about sixteen resident monks and seven resident laymen practicing Vipassana meditation at any given time. The local community, which is primarily Buddhist, looks after the day-to-day needs of the devotees.

There are about 12–15 meditation caves here. The main cave has many Buddha statues and paintings and is decorated with flowers. The monastery is situated in a Natural Forest Reservation. A stream called Nachchimale flows through one boundary of the monastery. There are many local plants, birds, rare butterfly species, and wild animals in this environment.

=== Parei Thota ===
Parevi Thota (පරෙවිතොට) or Parethota (පරේතොට) is a scenic area along the Nambapana Stream that attracts many visitors. Small ports and waterfalls are located in the small stream situated near Parethota area. It is threatened by littering.

=== Bodhinagala Aranya Senasanaya ===
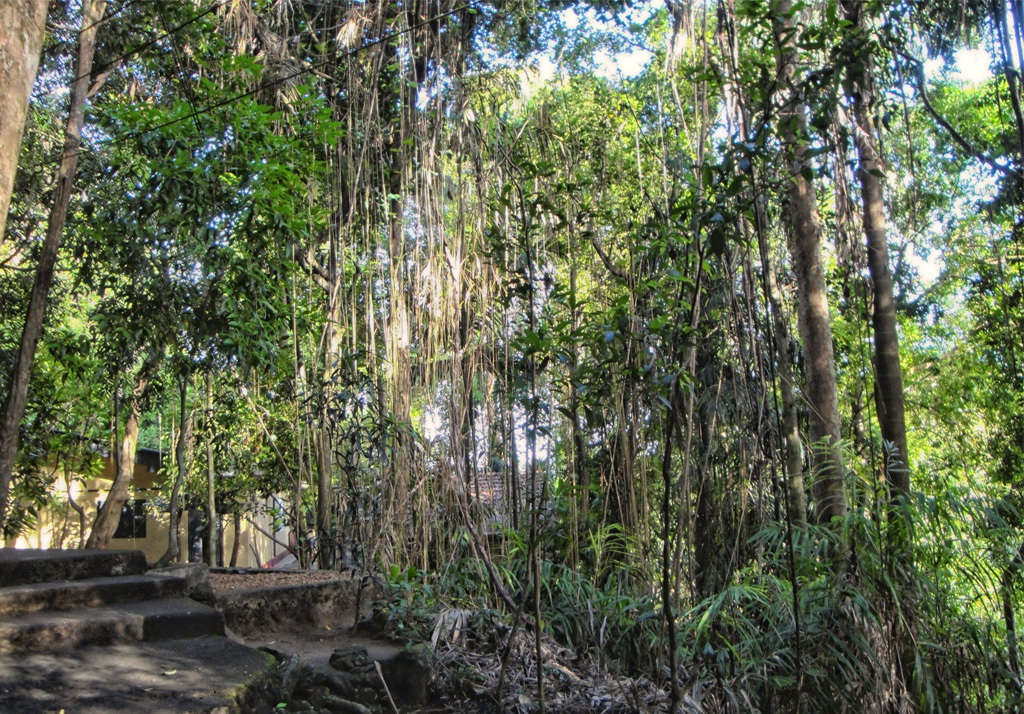
Bodhinagala Reservation

Bodhinagala Aranya Senasanaya is about 3 miles (4.8 km) from Ingiriya town. The Dombagaskanda Forest Reservation, where this place is situated, was named in 1955. The Kalu River flows through the southeast of this area, and the slope area is rich in herbal plants and southern wet zone plants. There are about 20 to 25 monks meditating in the caves in this Aranya Senasana. They come out from the caves only when they eat and then go back to the caves in the forest.

=== Bodhinagala Bird Sanctuary ===
This is a secondary lowland rainforest patch in the area of Ingiriya with a famous aranya senasanaya. The forest reserve consists of two mountains that are surrounded by villages. Inside the forest there are paved routes created for the Buddhist monks.

=== Hora Forest Reservation ===
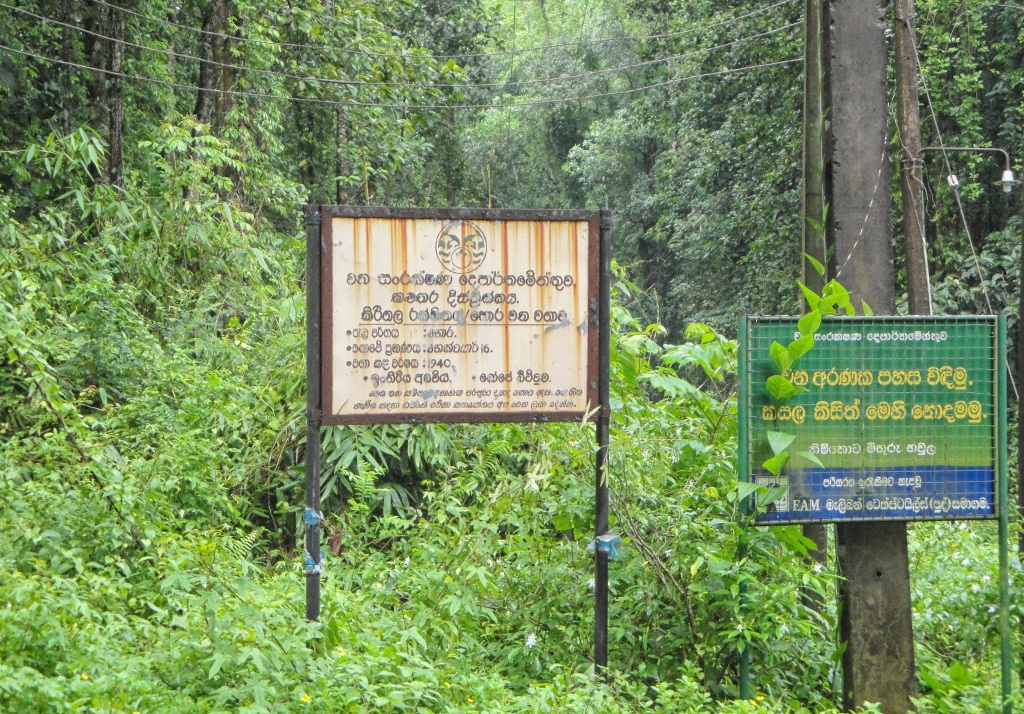
Hora Forest Reservation

The Hora Forest Reservation is in the Kirigala area. It is said to have the largest number of hora trees in South Asia. It also has many rare plants.

=== Kura Uda Waterfall ===
Kura Uda Waterfall is situated in the middle stretch of the small stream starting from Giranchi Mountain in the Forest Reservation. The Government Forest Reservation in which this waterfall is situated is rich in rare wet zone plants and herbal plants. Many birds and animals native to this area live here.

=== Urugala Holombuwa ===
Before the British established a road system, goods were transported to coastal areas from Sabaragamuwa by river. Kalu River was a major river for this transportation. Urugala Holombuwa was used as an anchoring point for vessels and ferries transporting goods. This holombuwa is the biggest whirlpool at the place where Nambapana Stream connects with Kalu River. it has more space and consists of a huge rock pile. Because of this, boatsmen used this as a resting place.

== History ==
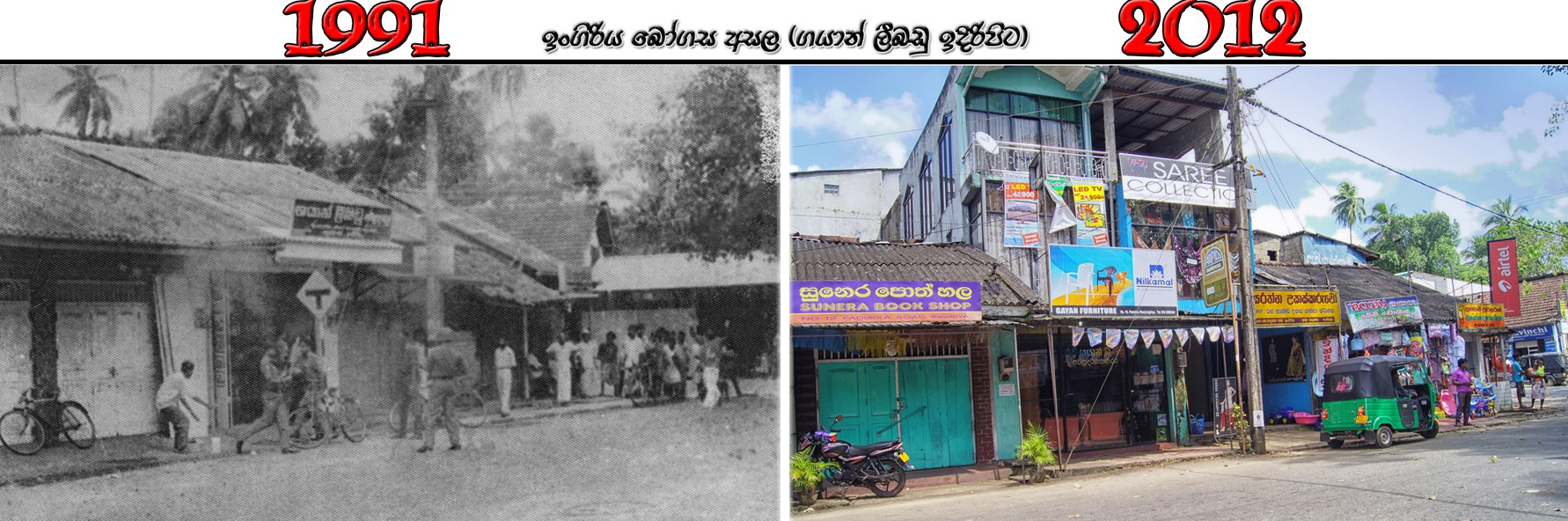
Ingiriya Old Photo

As the boundary ("Ima") of the Sabaragamuwa Mountain Ranges ends at Ingiriya, it is said in the folklore that the name "Ingriya" was originally "Imagira".

People have lived in this area for a long time, as shown in historical writings. A Portuguese income report written in 1599 shows that they collected revenue from nearby places like Munagama, Wagawatta, and Kekuladola. The present Rathnapura–Panadura road, which runs through Poruwadanda, has evidence of having been used for more than 186 years. A British doctor named John Dave travelled to Adams Peak in 1817 from Panadura via Horana, Rathnapura and Palabaddala. He described the beauty of the Ingiriya area as he travelled along this road. The main city was born in the beginning of plantation colonization by the British rulers. The Urugala and Nambapana areas of Ingiriya have a history which relates to the kings who ruled near Kalu River.

== Schools ==
Ingiriya contains 22 schools controlled by the provincial council.

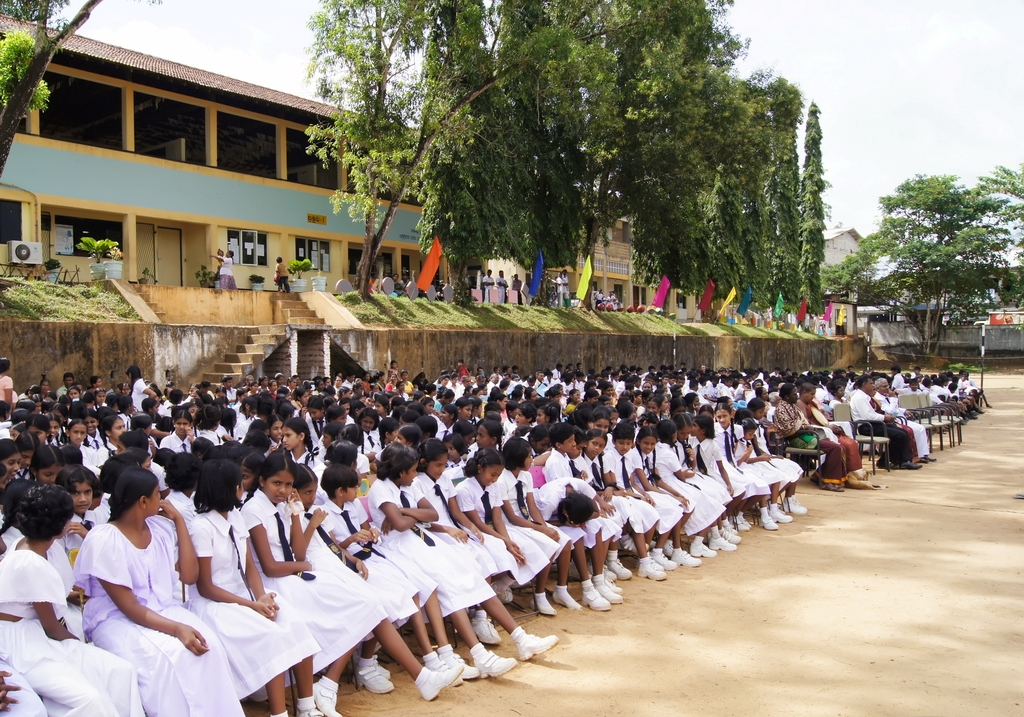
Gamini School

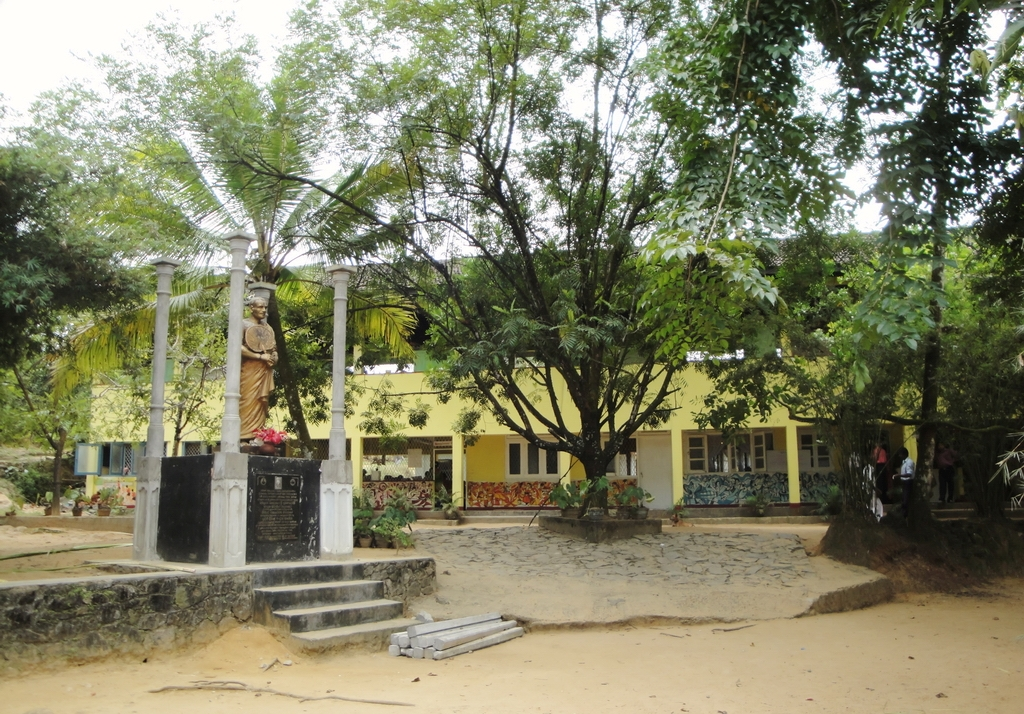
Sumanajothi School

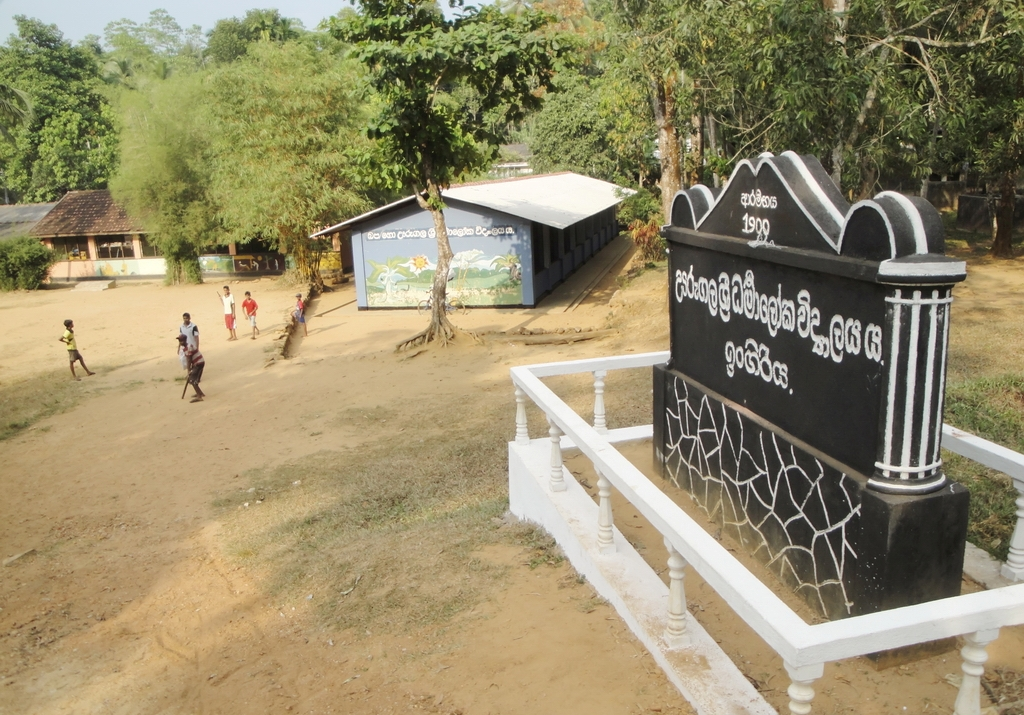
Dharmaloka School

School	Medium	G.N Division	Active Grade
Ingiriya Gamini Madya Maha Vidyalaya	Sinhala/English	620C, Ingiriya North	1 AB
Ingiriya Sri Sumanajothi Primary School	Sinhala	620C, Ingiriya North	3
Urugala Sri Darmaloka Maha Vidyalaya	Sinhala	619, Urugala East	2
Nambapana Kanishta Vidyalaya	Sinhala	619A, Nambapana	2
Raigamwaththa Parakkramabahu Primary School	Sinhala	620B, Raigamwatta	3
Kakulaliya Primary School	Sinhala	618B, Kekulaliya	3
Handapangoda Maha Vidyalaya	Sinhala	623B, Handapangoda West	1 C
Sagara Palansuriya Maha Vidyalaya	Sinhala	622, Handapangoda South	1 C
Isipathana Kanishta Vidyalaya	Sinhala	625, Arakawila	2
Maputugala Maha Vidyalaya	Sinhala	621A, Rathmalgoda	1 C
Menerigama Primary School	Sinhala	625A, Menerigama	3
Batugampala Primary School	Sinhala	624, Batugampala	3
Kalupahana Kanishta Vidyalaya	Sinhala	618, Wagawatta	2
Manana Sri Ghanarathana Primary School	Sinhala	620F, Dombagaskanda	2
Pelpitigoda Primary School	Sinhala	622, Pelpitigoda	3
Kandanapitiya Primary School	Sinhala	626, Kandanapitiya	3
Kurana Primary School	Sinhala	627, Kurana South	3
Dharmaloka Primary School	Sinhala	623B, Handapangoda West	3
Eduragala Tamil Primary School	Tamil	620E, Eduragala	3
Raigamwaththa Tamil School	Tamil	620B, Raigamwaththa	2
Raigamwaththa Saraswathi Tamil School	Tamil	620G, Raigamwaththa	3
Perth Tamil School	Tamil	618, Wagawatta	3

== Religious Places ==
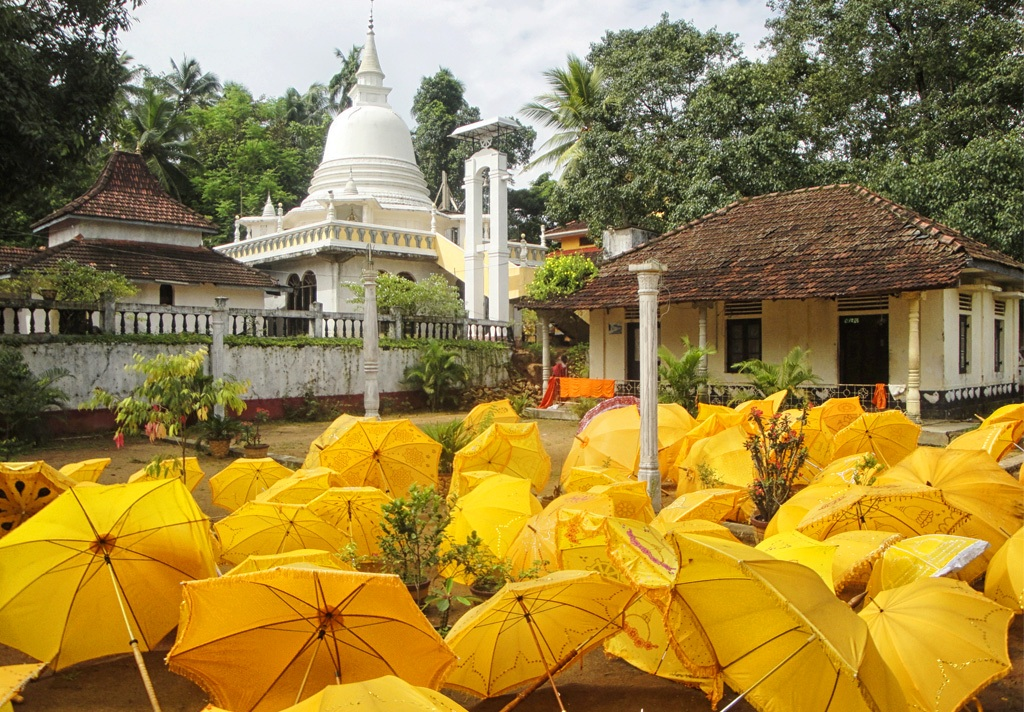
Ingiriya Deepaloka Temple

There are many places of worship in and around the city. Buddhist places of worship are most common, since Buddhists constitute the great majority in the area. There are some Hindu kovils serving the Tamil minority living in the plantation estates. There is also a Christian church in Ingiriya. The Population Reports show 89.4% Buddhist, 8.8% Hindu, 1.8% Christian and less than 0.1% other Religions in the Area.

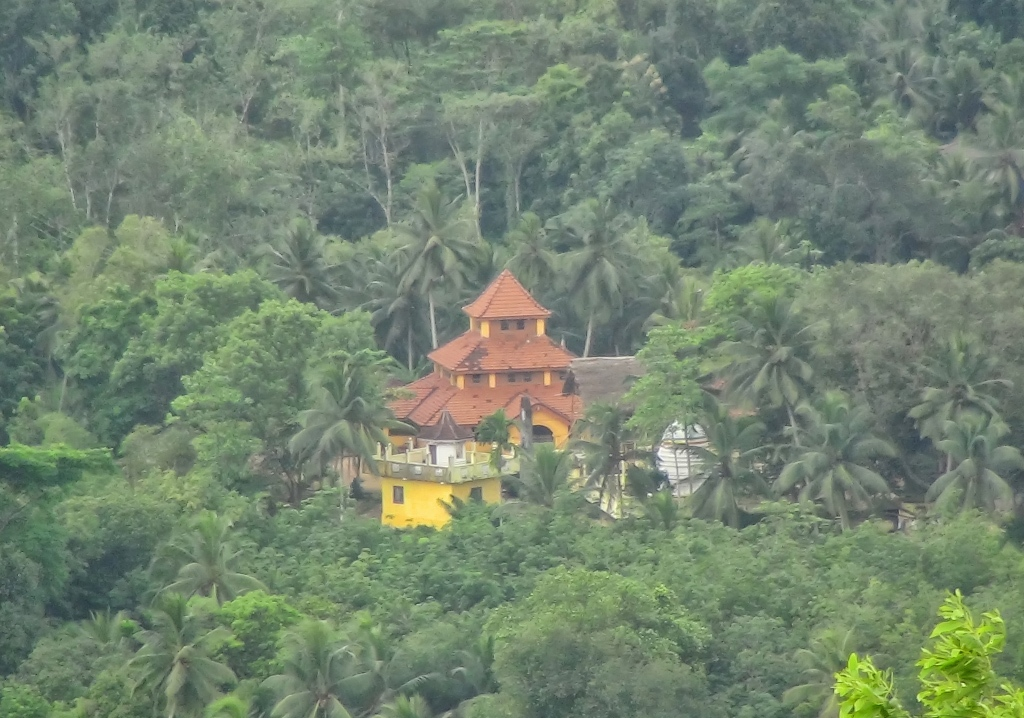
Urugala Sri Thapodhanarama Temple

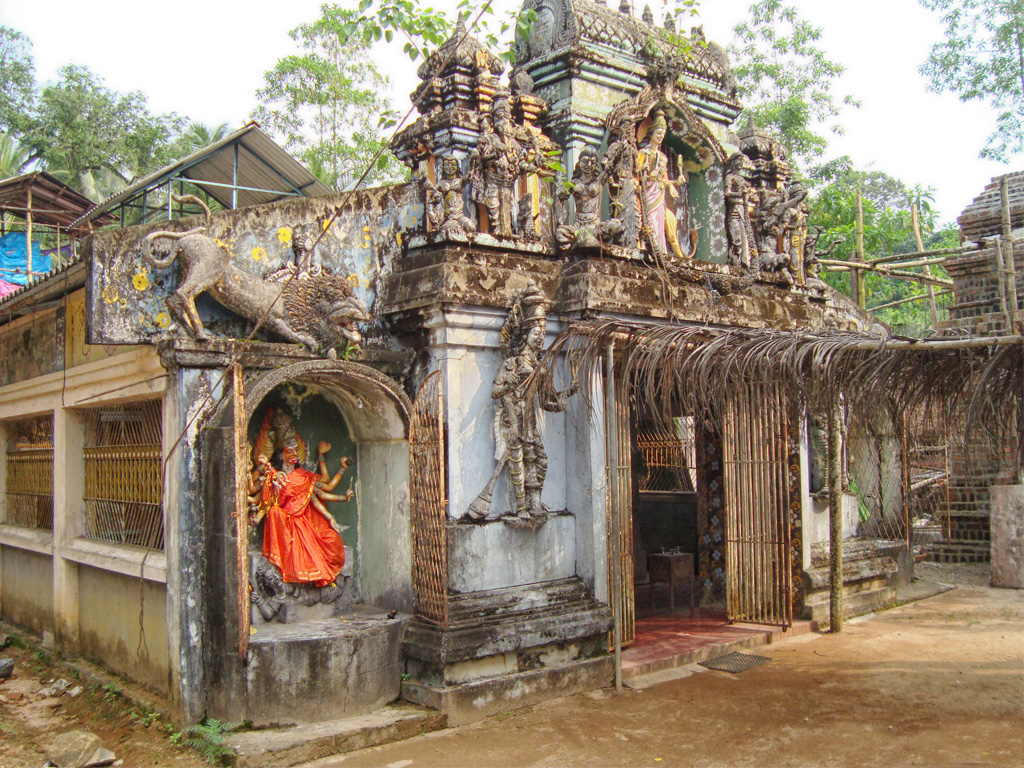
Ingiriya Kovil

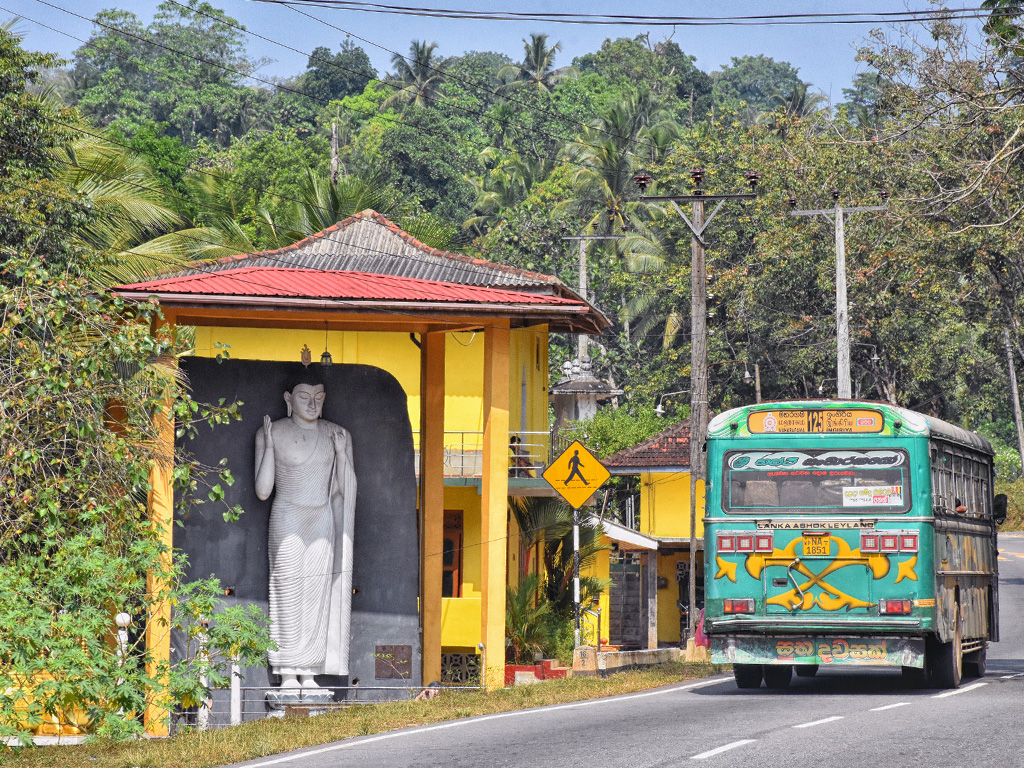
Imagira Siri Vijaya Bodhiraja Buddhist Center

=== Temples ===
Name	Address
Sri Devarakkitharamaya Temple	Wagawatta, Poruwadanda
Sri Sandagiri Temple	Arakawila, Handapangoda
Sri Wickramasinharamaya Temple	Maputugala, Poruwadanda
Sri Wijaya Bodhiraja Temple	Imagira, Ingiriya
Sri Thapodhanarama Temple	Pingodella, Urugala, Ingiriya
Sri Poorwarama Temple	Dombagaskanda, Ingiriya
Soliraja Temple	Ganethenna, Poruwadanda
Thilakaramaya Temple	Poruwadanda
Sri Sanghikaramaya Temple	Rathmalgoda, Poruwadanda
Ganeviharaya Temple	Handapangoda
Sri Sudharshanaramaya Temple	Manana, Poruwadanda
Sri Piyadassanaramaya Temple	Kurana, Kotigala, Handapangoda
Sri Sudharmaramaya Temple	Kekuladola, Batugampola
Sri Madurasama Temple	Nimalagama, Poruwadanda
Sri Gangathilaka Temple	Puhuwala
Sri Jayasooriya Temple	St.Peter's Colony, Ingiriya
Sri Nandarathanaramaya Temple	Pelpitigoda, Poruwadanda
Deepaloka Temple	Ingiriya
Sri Poorwaramaya Temple	Kandanapitiya, Bope, Padukka
Siri Nikethanaramaya Temple	Kekulaliya, Poruwadanda
Sri Wijayasunandaramaya Temple	Panangala Watta, Poruwadanda
Sri Sambodhi Temple	Arunagama, Poruwadanda
Sri Ruwanbodhi Temple	Boralugoda, Poruwadanda
Sri Sudhampaya Temple	Bodhirajagama, Ingiriya
Sri Isipathanaramaya Temple	Madakada, Bope, Padukka
Madakada Aranya Senasanaya	Madakada, Ingiriya
Bodhinagala Aranya Senasanaya	Dombagaskanda, Ingiriya
Nagalena Wiwekaramaya Temple	20 Acres, Ingiriya
Sri Jinarathanaramaya Temple	Arakawila, Handapangoda
Sri Shailatalaramaya Temple	Wagawatta, Poruwadanda
Kemanandaramaya	Batugampola
Sri Sambodhi Aranya Senasanaya	Madakada
Sri Subodhi Meheni Aramaya	Kurana

=== Kovil ===
Name	Address
Sri Muththumari Amman Kovil	Wagawatta, Poruwadanda
Sri Kurunchi Mahamari Amman Kovil	Raigamwatta, Ingiriya
Ingiriya Sri Paththini Kovil	Ingiriya
Raigamwatta Sri Paththini Kovil	Raigamwatta, Ingiriya

=== Churches ===
Name	Address
Ingiriya Church	Ingiriya

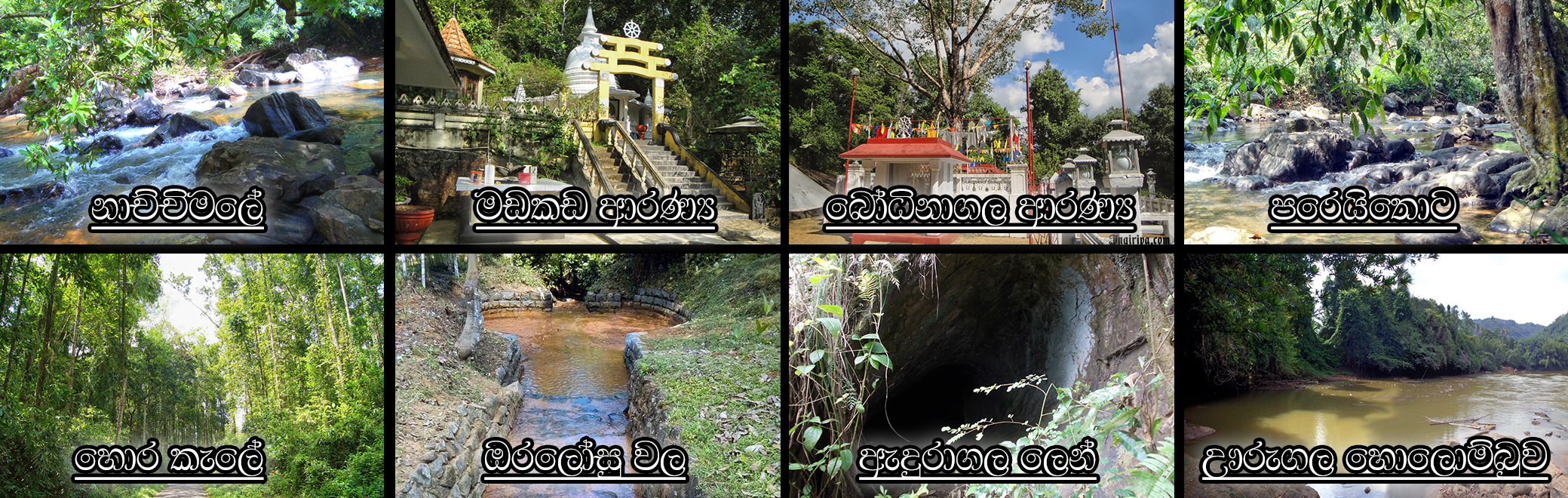
Ingiriya Famous Places

== Popular Arts ==
The Ingiriya village is mentioned in Paata Kurullo Teledrama series. Kevin's driver Manjitha's house is located in Ingiriya.
