= Kaduwela Electoral District =

Electoral district of Sri Lanka

Kaduwela electoral district was an electoral district of Sri Lanka between July 1977 and February 1989. The district was named after the town of Kaduwela in Colombo District, Western Province. The 1978 Constitution of Sri Lanka introduced proportional representation for electing members of Parliament. The existing 160 mainly single-member electoral districts were replaced with 22 multi-member electoral districts. Kaduwela electoral district was replaced by the Colombo multi-member electoral district at the 1989 general elections, the first under proportional representation.

== Members of Parliament ==
Key

Independent SLFP UNP

Election	Member	Party	Term
1977	M. D. H. Jayawardena	UNP	1977-83
1983 (Nom)	E. P. Paul Perera	UNP	1983-89

== Elections ==
=== 1977 Parliamentary General Election ===
Results of the 8th parliamentary election held on 21 July 1977 for the district:

Candidate	Party	Symbol	Votes	%
M. D. H. Jayawardena	United National Party	Elephant	28,178	55.59
Kingsly Tissa Wickremeratna		Hand	16,383	323.32
Vajira Pelpita		Key	4,094	8.08
Indika Gunawardhena		Chair	1,874	3.70
Valid Votes			50,529	99.69
Rejected Votes			155	0.31
Total Polled			50,684	100.00
Registered Electors			59,407	
Turnout				85.32
