= A. P. Jayasuriya =

Ceylonese politician (1901–1980)

Hon. A. P. Jayasuriya

Minister of Health
- In office 23 July 1960 – May 1963
- Prime Minister: Wijeyananda Dahanayake
- Preceded by: M. V. P. Peiris
- Succeeded by: Badi-ud-din Mahmud
- In office 26 September 1959 – 8 December 1959
- Prime Minister: Sirimavo Bandaranaike
- Preceded by: Vimala Wijewardene
- Succeeded by: M. V. P. Peiris

Parliamentary Secretary to Minister of Posts and Telecommunications
- In office 1947–1951

Senator of Ceylon
- In office 20 October 1956 – 28 September 1971

Member of the Ceylon Parliament for Horana
- In office 14 October 1947 – 30 May 1952
- Preceded by: Constituency Created
- Succeeded by: M. D. H. Jayawardena

State Council of Ceylon
- In office 25 February 1936 – 1947
- Preceded by: E. W. Perera

Personal details
- Born: Alexander Perera Jayasuriya; 1 November 1901 Dominion of Ceylon (now Sri Lanka)
- Died: 28 August 1980 (aged 78) Horana
- Party: Sri Lanka Freedom Party (After 1951); United National Party (Before 1951)
- Relations: John Perera Jayasuriya (father)
- Education: University of London; Royal College, Colombo; Sri Sumangala College, Panadura
- Profession: Barrister

Alexander Perera Jayasuriya (1 November 1901 – 28 August 1980) was a Ceylonese politician. He was a Minister of Health, Senator and Member of Parliament. He was one of the founders of the Sri Lanka Freedom Party.

== Early life ==
Jayasuriya was educated at Sri Sumangala College in Panadura and then Royal College, Colombo. He traveled to England in 1922 where he studied law. He was called to the bar at Lincoln's Inn in 1926 as a Barrister. He returned to Ceylon and practiced law as an Advocate.

== Political career ==
On 25 February 1936, Jayasuriya was elected to the State Council of Ceylon, representing Horana. Following the dissolution of the State Council Jayasuriya contested the 1st parliamentary elections, held between 23 August 1947 and 20 September 1947, for the Horana electorate on behalf of the United National Party. He won the seat with 15,828 votes (45%). Jayasuriya was appointed Parliamentary Secretary to the Minister of Posts and Telecommunications. In 1951 he crossed over to the opposition with S. W. R. D. Bandaranaike to form the Sri Lanka Freedom Party (SLFP).

He contested the seat of Agalawatte as the SLFP candidate at the 2nd parliamentary election, held between 24 May 1952 and 30 May 1952. He was unsuccessful, polling 3,480 votes (12.5%), finishing third to C. W. W. Kannangara, the United National Party candidate, with 13,659 votes (49%) and the Lanka Sama Samaja Party candidate, S. A. Silva, with 6,627 votes (24%).

In October 1956, he was elected to the Senate and appointed Minister of Home Affairs by Prime Minister Bandaranaike. In 1959 after the assassination of Bandaranaike he was appointed Minister of Health by Prime Minister Wijeyananda Dahanayake. In July 1960, Prime Minister Sirimavo Bandaranaike re-appointed him as minister of health. In 1970 he was elected Leader of the Senate and lost his seat when his government abolished the Senate that year. He served as Senior Vice President of SLFP until his death in 1980.
