= Kotte Electoral District =

Former electoral district in Sri Lanka

Kotte electoral district was an electoral district of Sri Lanka between August 1947 and February 1989. The district was named after the town of Kotte in Colombo District, Western Province. The 1978 Constitution of Sri Lanka introduced the proportional representation electoral system for electing members of Parliament. The existing 160 mainly single-member electoral districts were replaced with 22 multi-member electoral districts. Kotte electoral district was replaced by the Colombo multi-member electoral district at the 1989 general elections, the first under the PR system, though Kotte continues to be a polling division of the multi-member electoral district.

== Members of Parliament ==
Key

Independent Communist Party LSSP SLFP UNP

Election	Member	Party	Term
1947	Robert Gunawardena	Lanka Sama Samaja Party	1947-1952
1952	Robert Gunawardena	Lanka Sama Samaja Party	1952-1956
1956	Robert Gunawardena	Lanka Sama Samaja Party	1956-1960
1960	A. J. Niyathapala	United National Party	1960-1960
1960	Stanley Tillekeratne	Communist Party	1960-1965
1965	Stanley Tillekeratne	Sri Lanka Freedom Party	1965-1970
1970	Stanley Tillekeratne	Sri Lanka Freedom Party	1970-1977
1977	Ananda Tissa de Alwis	United National Party	1977-1989

== Elections ==
=== 1947 Parliamentary General Election ===
Results of the 1st parliamentary election held between 23 August 1947 and 20 September 1947 for the district:

Candidate	Party	Symbol	Votes	%
Robert Gunawardena		Elephant	11,955	56.36
R. Hewavitarana		Cart Wheel	7,753	36.55
W. G. Ratnayake		Hand	928	4.37
D. F. Galhena		Star	362	1.71
C. A. Boteju		House	215	1.01
Valid Votes			21,213	98.34
Rejected Votes			359	1.66
Total Polled			21,572	100.00
Registered Electors			45,754	
Turnout				47.15

=== 1952 Parliamentary General Election ===
Results of the 2nd parliamentary election held between 24 May 1952 and 30 May 1952 for the district:

Candidate	Party	Symbol	Votes	%
Robert Gunawardena		Elephant	15,865	53.38
Ananda Tissa de Alwis		Hand	11,051	37.18
N. J. V. Cooray		Star	2,807	9.44
Valid Votes			29,723	99.45
Rejected Votes			164	0.55
Total Polled			29,887	100.00
Registered Electors			47,510	
Turnout				62.91

=== 1956 Parliamentary General Election ===
Results of the 3rd parliamentary election held between 5 April 1956 and 10 April 1956 for the district:

Candidate	Party	Symbol	Votes	%
Robert Gunawardena	Lanka Sama Samaja Party	Key	25,050	69.88
Ananda Tissa de Alwis		Elephant	10,244	28.58
W. H. Fonseka		Bicycle	551	1.54
Valid Votes			35,845	99.62
Rejected Votes			138	0.38
Total Polled			35,983	100.00
Registered Electors			57,558	
Turnout				62.52

=== 1960 (March) Parliamentary General Election ===
Results of the 4th parliamentary election held on 19 March 1960 for the district:

Candidate	Party	Symbol	Votes	%
A. J. Niyathapala	United National Party	Elephant	8,850	34.89
Stanley Tillekeratne	Communist Party	Star	7,110	28.03
D. L. Pathirage		Key	4,969	19.59
W. W. A. Fernando	Sri Lanka Freedom Party	Hand	4,298	16.94
D. F. Galhena		Umbrella	141	0.56
Valid Votes			25,368	99.65
Rejected Votes			89	0.35
Total Polled			25,457	100.00
Registered Electors			33,810	
Turnout				75.29

=== 1960 (July) Parliamentary General Election ===
Results of the 5th parliamentary election held on 20 July 1960 for the district:

Candidate	Party	Symbol	Votes	%
Stanley Tillekeratne	Communist Party	Star	14,589	57.65
A. J. Niyathapala	United National Party	Elephant	10,447	41.28
Dickmon Wijesinghe		Cart Wheel	146	0.58
D. F. Galhena		Pot	125	0.49
Valid Votes			25,307	99.74
Rejected Votes			66	0.26
Total Polled			25,373	100.00
Registered Electors			33,810	
Turnout				75.05

=== 1965 Parliamentary General Election ===
Results of the 6th parliamentary election held on 22 March 1965 for the district:

Candidate	Party	Symbol	Votes	%
Stanley Tillekeratne	Sri Lanka Freedom Party	Hand	20,503	52.03
A. J. Niyathapala	United National Party	Elephant	18,155	46.07
K. Jinadasa Perera	Mahajana Eksath Peramuna	Cart Wheel	388	0.98
N. W. de Costa		Cockerel	103	0.26
Valid Votes			39,149	99.35
Rejected Votes			258	0.65
Total Polled			39,407*	100.00
Registered Electors			49,170	
Turnout				80.14

=== 1970 Parliamentary General Election ===
Results of the 7th parliamentary election held on 27 May 1970 for the district:

Candidate	Party	Symbol	Votes	%
Stanley Tillekeratne	Sri Lanka Freedom Party	Hand	32,051	56.81
A. J. Niyathapala	United National Party	Elephant	24,208	42.91
Valid Votes			56,259	99.72
Rejected Votes			156	0.28
Total Polled			56,415	100.00
Registered Electors			68,383	
Turnout				82.50

=== 1977 Parliamentary General Election ===
Results of the 8th parliamentary election held on 21 July 1977 for the district:

Candidate	Party	Symbol	Votes	%
Ananda Tissa de Alwis	United National Party	Elephant	23,249	54.46
A. J. Niyathapala	Sri Lanka Freedom Party	Chair	15,375	36.02
K. Siriwardhana		Star	3,772	8.84
Kalinga Piyadasa de Silva		Flower	131	0.31
Ananda Alwis		Rabbit	124	0.29
Victor Amarasinghe		Spoon	37	0.09
Valid Votes			42,688	99.70
Rejected Votes			129	0.30
Total Polled			42,817	100.00
Registered Electors			52,707	
Turnout				81.24
