= Indradasa Hettiarachchi =

Sri Lankan politician (1927–2025)

Hon. Indradasa Hettiarachchi

Personal details
- Born: 13 October 1927 Kalutara, British Ceylon
- Died: 11 January 2025 (aged 97) Colombo, Sri Lanka
- Party: United National Party
- Education: Ananda College Colombo; Nalanda College Colombo
- Occupation: Politician
- Profession: Planter

Deshabandu Indradasa Hettiarachchi (13 October 1927 – 11 January 2025) was a Sri Lankan politician who served as Minister of Industries.

== Life and career ==
Hettiarachchi was born 13 October 1927 in Kalutara, the son of a tea, rubber and coconut planter, to a family with five sisters and two brothers. The family moved to Horana, where he attended Ananda and Nalanda Colleges, before completing his studies at Pembroke (a defunct ‘finishing school’). He contested and won a seat on the Horana Village Council and a year later, following the resignation of the sitting chairman, Hettiarchchi was appointed to the position, which he held for the next eighteen years.

He was elected as a Member of Parliament, representing Horana at the 8th parliamentary election held on 21 July 1977.

In 2005, he was conferred with the title of Deshabandu by the President.

Hettiarachchi died on 11 January 2025, at the age of 97.
