= Handapangoda =

Town in Kalutara District, Sri Lanka

Coordinates: 6°48′N 80°09′E

Handapangoda is a town in Kalutara District, in the Western Province of Sri Lanka. It is on the road from Ingiriya to Colombo. It is located 45 km away from Colombo and 15 km away from Horana and 7 km from Ingiriya. The town is administered by an Horana Pradeshiya Saba Council. Handapangoda is the sub-town of the Horana election division as well as Ingiriya Sectoral Division. Dharmashoka College is located close to the Handapangoda town. There is a stream or river, Mawak Ela, about 2.5 km away.

== Nearby settlements ==
Listed below are some settlements close to Handapangoda:

- Kurana (2.1 km)
- Kotigala (2.1 km)
- Arakawila (2.1 km)
- Menerigama (2.1 km)
- Kompe (2.5 km)
- Batugampola (2.5 km)

== General ==
Handapangoda is situated in Western Sri Lanka, its geographical coordinates are 6° 47' 35" North, 80° 8' 30" East.
