= Horana Electoral District =

Electoral district of Sri Lanka

Horana electoral district was an electoral district of Sri Lanka between August 1947 and February 1989. The district was named after the town of Horana in Kalutara District, Western Province. The 1978 Constitution of Sri Lanka introduced the proportional representation electoral system for electing members of Parliament. The existing 160 mainly single-member electoral districts were replaced with 22 multi-member electoral districts. Horana electoral district was replaced by the Kalutara multi-member electoral district at the 1989 general elections, the first under the PR system, though Horana continues to be a polling division of the multi-member electoral district.

== Members of Parliament ==
Key

MEP SLFP UNP

| Election | Member | Party | Term |
|---|---|---|---|
| 1947 | A. P. Jayasuriya | United National Party | 1947-1952 |
| 1952 | M. D. H. Jayawardena | United National Party | 1952-1956 |
| 1956 | K. A. S. Palansuriya | Sri Lanka Freedom Party | 1956-1960 |
| 1960 | Ratnasiri Wickremanayake | Mahajana Eksath Peramuna | 1960-1960 |
| 1960 | Ratnasiri Wickremanayake | Mahajana Eksath Peramuna (1960-1962); Sri Lanka Freedom Party (1962-1965) | 1960-1965 |
| 1965 | Ratnasiri Wickremanayake | Sri Lanka Freedom Party | 1965-1970 |
| 1970 | Ratnasiri Wickremanayake | Sri Lanka Freedom Party | 1970-1977 |
| 1977 | Indradasa Hettiarachchi | United National Party | 1977-1989 |

== Elections ==
=== 1947 Parliamentary General Election ===
Results of the 1st parliamentary election held between 23 August 1947 and 20 September 1947 for the district:

| Candidate | Party | Symbol | Votes | % |
|---|---|---|---|---|
| A. P. Jayasuriya | | Elephant | 15,828 | 45.40 |
| M. T. Peiris | | Umbrella | 15,163 | 44.36 |
| A. Dharmapriya | | Lamp | 3,187 | 9.14 |
| Valid Votes | | | 34,178 | 98.03 |
| Rejected Votes | | | 687 | 1.97 |
| Total Polled | | | 34,865 | 100.00 |
| Registered Electors | | | 51,108 | |
| Turnout | | | | 68.22 |

=== 1952 Parliamentary General Election ===
Results of the 2nd parliamentary election held between 24 May 1952 and 30 May 1952 for the district:

| Candidate | Party | Symbol | Votes | % |
|---|---|---|---|---|
| M. D. H. Jayawardena | | Elephant | 21,746 | 50.59 |
| Ariyadasa Jayawardana | | Hand | 8,249 | 19.19 |
| Wilfred Senanayake | | Bird | 7,367 | 17.14 |
| Esme Perera | | Umbrella | 5,145 | 11.97 |
| Valid Votes | | | 42,507 | 98.89 |
| Rejected Votes | | | 477 | 1.11 |
| Total Polled | | | 42,984 | 100.00 |
| Registered Electors | | | 53,927 | |
| Turnout | | | | 79.71 |

=== 1956 Parliamentary General Election ===
Results of the 3rd parliamentary election held between 5 April 1956 and 10 April 1956 for the district:

| Candidate | Party | Symbol | Votes | % |
|---|---|---|---|---|
| K. A. S. Palansuriya | | Hand | 29,780 | 60.51 |
| M. D. H. Jayawardena | | Elephant | 19,125 | 38.86 |
| Valid Votes | | | 48,905 | 99.37 |
| Rejected Votes | | | 312 | 0.63 |
| Total Polled | | | 49,217 | 100.00 |
| Registered Electors | | | 60,680 | |
| Turnout | | | | 81.11 |

=== 1960 (March) Parliamentary General Election ===
Results of the 4th parliamentary election held on 19 March 1960 for the district:

| Candidate | Party | Symbol | Votes | % |
|---|---|---|---|---|
| Ratnasiri Wickremanayake | Mahajana Eksath Peramuna | Cartwheel | 15,759 | 54.57 |
| M. D. H. Jayawardena | United National Party | Elephant | 10,649 | 36.87 |
| H. D. Jinadasa | | Key | 1,721 | 5.96 |
| Walter Peiris | | Umbrella | 353 | 1.22 |
| G. M. Perera | | Sun | 210 | 0.73 |
| Valid Votes | | | 28,692 | 99.35 |
| Rejected Votes | | | 187 | 0.65 |
| Total Polled | | | 28,879 | 100.00 |
| Registered Electors | | | 33,713 | |
| Turnout | | | | 85.66 |

=== 1960 (July) Parliamentary General Election ===
Results of the 5th parliamentary election held on 20 July 1960 for the district:

| Candidate | Party | Symbol | Votes | % |
|---|---|---|---|---|
| Ratnasiri Wickremanayake | | Orange | 14,023 | 50.69 |
| Indradasa Hettiarachchi | United National Party | Elephant | 11,998 | 43.37 |
| K. David | | Cartwheel | 1,555 | 5.62 |
| Valid Votes | | | 27,576 | 99.67 |
| Rejected Votes | | | 90 | 0.33 |
| Total Polled | | | 27,666 | 100.00 |
| Registered Electors | | | 33,713 | |
| Turnout | | | | 82.06 |

=== 1965 Parliamentary General Election ===
Results of the 6th parliamentary election held on 22 March 1965 for the district:

| Candidate | Party | Symbol | Votes | % |
|---|---|---|---|---|
| Ratnasiri Wickremanayake | Sri Lanka Freedom Party | Hand | 18,957 | 52.97 |
| Indradasa Hettiarachchi | United National Party | Elephant | 16,149 | 45.13 |
| D. L. Gunawardena | Mahajana Eksath Peramuna | Cartwheel | 491 | 1.37 |
| Valid Votes | | | 35,597 | 99.47 |
| Rejected Votes | | | 190 | 0.53 |
| Total Polled | | | 35,787 | 100.00 |
| Registered Electors | | | 40,763 | |
| Turnout | | | | 87.79 |

=== 1970 Parliamentary General Election ===
Results of the 7th parliamentary election held on 27 May 1970 for the district:

| Candidate | Party | Symbol | Votes | % |
|---|---|---|---|---|
| Ratnasiri Wickremanayake | Sri Lanka Freedom Party | Hand | 24,163 | 58.03 |
| Indradasa Hettiarachchi | United National Party | Elephant | 17,410 | 41.81 |
| Valid Votes | | | 41,573 | 99.84 |
| Rejected Votes | | | 68 | 0.16 |
| Total Polled | | | 41,641 | 100.00 |
| Registered Electors | | | 45,330 | |
| Turnout | | | | 91.86 |

=== 1977 Parliamentary General Election ===
Results of the 8th parliamentary election held on 21 July 1977 for the district:

| Candidate | Party | Symbol | Votes | % |
|---|---|---|---|---|
| Indradasa Hettiarachchi | | Elephant | 27,188 | 56.46 |
| Ratnasiri Wickremanayake | | Hand | 19,453 | 40.40 |
| Premalal Gunasekera | | Star | 1,090 | 2.26 |
| Jayasena Jayasinghe | | Lamp | 302 | 0.63 |
| Valid Votes | | | 48,033 | 99.75 |
| Rejected Votes | | | 120 | 0.25 |
| Total Polled | | | 48,153 | 100.00 |
| Registered Electors | | | 53,138 | |
| Turnout | | | | 90.62 |
