= Chandra Gunasekera =

Sri Lankan politician

Hon. Chandra Gunasekera

Member of Parliament for Kottawa
- In office June 1970 – 1977

Personal details
- Born: 10 June 1922 Sri Lanka
- Died: pre-2006
- Party: Lanka Sama Samaja Party
- Education: Nalanda College Colombo
- Occupation: Politics

Handapangoda Mudalige Chandrapala Gunasekera (known as Chandra Gunasekera) (10 June 1922 – before 2006) was a Sri Lankan politician who served as a Member of Parliament. He was the Deputy Minister of Culture and Social Services.

Gunasekera first contested for a parliamentary seat at the 1st parliamentary election, held between August and September 1947, in the Attangalla electorate, representing the Lanka Sama Samaja Party. He was beaten by the United National Party candidate, Solomon West Ridgeway Dias Bandaranaike, 31,463 votes to 4,609 votes.

At the 6th parliamentary election, held on 22 March 1965, Gunasekera ran in the Kottawa electorate. He failed to get elected and was defeated by the United National Party candidate, Mahabalage Don Henry Jayawardena, by 2060 votes. Gunasekera received 13,911 votes (36% of the total vote).

He was successful in winning the seat at the subsequent 7th parliamentary election, held on 27 May 1970, defeating Jayawardena by 11,495, securing 61% of the total vote.

Prior to the 1977 Sri Lankan parliamentary elections the Kottawa electorate was replaced by the Colombo East Electoral District, Gunasekera contested the seat of Attangalla, where he challenged the sitting member and Prime Minister, Sirimavo Bandaranaike. He came third in the electoral race, 29,159 votes behind Bandaranaike and 18,496 votes behind the United National Party candidate, A. W. G. Seneviratne, only securing 2% of the total vote.

The Lanka Sama Samaja Party was the first Marxist party in Sri Lanka. He was educated at Nalanda College Colombo.

Gunasekera died prior to 2006.
