= Sagara Palansuriya =

Sri Lankan poet, teacher, and politician

Hon. Sagara Palansuriya

Member of Parliament for Horana
- In office 1956–1960
- Prime Minister: S. W. R. D. Bandaranaike; Wijeyananda Dahanayake
- Preceded by: M. D. H. Jayawardena
- Succeeded by: Ratnasiri Wickremanayake

Personal details
- Born: Palansuriya Mohottalalage Dingiri Mahaththaya; 11 March 1908 Kalalella, Ratnapura, Sri Lanka
- Died: 22 June 1961 (aged 53)
- Party: Viplavakari Lanka Sama Samaja Party
- Spouse: Gladis Chandra Perera
- Children: Keerthivijaya, Lakvijaya, Geethakumara
- Profession: Poet, Teacher, Politician
- Nickname(s): Kalalelle Ananda Sagara (KAS), Kayes

Palansuriya Mohottalalage Dingiri Mahaththaya (Sinhala: පලන්සුරිය මොහොට්ටාලලාගේ ඩිංගිරි මහත්තයා), known as Sagara Palansuriya (Sinhala: සාගර පලන්සූරිය) in later life, was a Sri Lankan poet, teacher and Member of Parliament.

== Early life ==
Palansuriya Mohottalalage Dingiri Mahaththaya was born on 11 March 1908 at Kalalella, Ratnapura, Sri Lanka.

Sagara undertook his primary education at Madampagama Rural Sinhala school, going on, to then join the Sangha under the name Ven. Kalalelle Pemananda. Under the tutelage of Ven. Ethoya Penanissa thero he was educated in the Sinhalese language, literature, sociology, culture and politics, in addition to learning several eastern languages as a scholar of the Vidyalankara Pirivena (now the University of Kelaniya). He traveled to Shanthi Nikethana in India to continue his studies.

== Career and service ==
In his second term of priestliness, Kalalelle Ananda Sagara continued his career as a teacher and promoted his style of Poesy, compiling verses such as Kalakanniya, Kelani Withthi, Paddiyavatiya, Mal Hamy and Visirinu Tharu under the pseudonym KAS (Kayes). His best works are regarded to have been Sudo Sudu and the Mal Hamy, both of which contributed to his recognition as one among the leading literary figures in the country.

He also was a teacher at Ananda College Colombo and Nalanda College, Colombo.

Palansuriya went on to renounce his monkhood, reverting to his lay name Sagara Palansuriya, and entered politics in 1947, joining the Viplavakari Lanka Sama Samaja Party led by Philip Gunawardena. He was able to secure a place in Parliament in 1956, representing the Horana Electoral District for the Mahajana Ekasth Peramuna led by S. W. R. D. Bandaranaike. Due to his interest in left-wing politics, he maintained a close relationship with Sama Samaja and Communist Party politicians, including Tikiri Banda Subasinghe, K. M. P. Rajarathna, Nimal Karunatillake, Lakshman Rajapaksa, M. S. Themis and T. B. Ilangaratne. He often drew attention to the plight of the rural farming community.

Palansuriya retired from politics in 1960 due to failing health and died on 22 June 1961.

== See also ==
- Wimalaratne Kumaragama
