= Kottawa Electoral District =

Electoral district of Sri Lanka

Kottawa electoral district was an electoral district of Sri Lanka between March 1960 and July 1977. The district was named after the town of Kottawa in Colombo District, Western Province. The 1978 Constitution of Sri Lanka introduced the proportional representation electoral system for electing members of Parliament. The existing 160 mainly single-member electoral districts were replaced with 22 multi-member electoral districts. Kottawa electoral district was replaced by the Colombo multi-member electoral district at the 1989 general elections.

== Members of Parliament ==
Key

Independent MEP UNP

Election	Member	Party	Term
1960 (March)	Robert Gunawardena	Lanka Sama Samaja Party	1960-1960
1960 (July)	Robert Gunawardena	Lanka Sama Samaja Party	1960-1965
1965	M. D. H. Jayawardena	United National Party	1965-1970
1970	Chandra Gunasekera	Lanka Sama Samaja Party	1970-1977

== Elections ==
=== 1960 (March) Parliamentary General Election ===
Results of the 4th parliamentary election held on 19 March 1960 for the district:

Candidate	Party	Symbol	Votes	%
Robert Gunawardena	Lanka Sama Samaja Party	Key	12,928	76.51
Henry Boteju	United National Party	Elephant	8,879	34.09
W. Bodhipala		Hand	4,101	15.75
Valid Votes			25,908	99.47
Rejected Votes			137	0.53
Total Polled			26,045	100.00
Registered Electors			34,871	
Turnout				74.69

=== 1960 (July) Parliamentary General Election ===
Results of the 5th parliamentary election held on 20 July 1960 for the district:

Candidate	Party	Symbol	Votes	%
Robert Gunawardena	Mahajana Eksath Peramuna	Cartwheel	11,276	40.35
Mahabalage Don Henry Jayawardena	United National Party	Elephant	10,912	39.04
D. D. Weragala		Hand	5,662	20.26
Valid Votes			27,850	99.65
Rejected Votes			99	0.35
Total Polled			27,949	100
Registered Electors			34,871	
Turnout				80.15

=== 1965 Parliamentary General Election ===
Results of the 6th parliamentary election held on 22 March 1965 for the district:

Candidate	Party	Symbol	Votes	%
Mahabalage Don Henry Jayawardena	United National Party	Elephant	15,971	41.78
Chandra Gunasekera	Lanka Sama Samaja Party	Key	13,911	36.39
Robert Gunawardena		Chair	8,095	21.17
Valid Votes			38,090	99.63
Rejected Votes			140	0.37
Total Polled			38,230	100.00
Registered Electors			45,877	
Turnout				83.33

=== 1970 Parliamentary General Election ===
Results of the 7th parliamentary election held on 27 May 1970 for the district:

Candidate	Party	Symbol	Votes	%
Chandra Gunasekera	Lanka Sama Samaja Party	Key	31,662	60.95
Mahabalage Don Henry Jayawardena	United National Party	Elephant	20,167	38.82
Valid Votes			51,829	99.78
Rejected Votes			115	0.22
Total Polled			51,944	100.00
Registered Electors			59,658	
Turnout				87.07
