= Attanagalla Electoral District =

Sri Lankan electoral district (1947–1989)

Coordinates: 7.1119°N 80.1328°E

Attanagalla electoral district was an electoral district of Sri Lanka between August 1947 and February 1989. The district was named after the town of Attanagalla in present-day Gampaha District, Western Province. The 1978 Constitution of Sri Lanka introduced the proportional representation electoral system for electing members of Parliament. The existing 160 mainly single-member electoral districts were replaced with 22 multi-member electoral districts. Attanagalla electoral district was replaced by the Gampaha multi-member electoral district at the 1989 general elections, the first under the PR system, though Attanagalla continues to be a polling division of the multi-member electoral district.

== Members of Parliament ==
Key

Independent SLFP UNP

Election	Member	Party	Term
1947	S. W. R. D. Bandaranaike	United National Party	1947-1952
1952	S. W. R. D. Bandaranaike	Sri Lanka Freedom Party	1952-1956
1956	S. W. R. D. Bandaranaike	Sri Lanka Freedom Party	1956-1959
1960	James Peter Obeyesekere III	Sri Lanka Freedom Party	1960-1960
1960	James Peter Obeyesekere III	Sri Lanka Freedom Party	1960-1965
1965	Sirimavo R. D. Bandaranaike	Sri Lanka Freedom Party	1965-1970
1970	Sirimavo R. D. Bandaranaike	Sri Lanka Freedom Party	1970-1977
1977	Sirimavo R. D. Bandaranaike	Sri Lanka Freedom Party	1977-1980
1980 (Nom)	Lakshman Jayakody	Sri Lanka Freedom Party	1980-1989

== Elections ==
=== 1947 Parliamentary General Election ===
Results of the 1st parliamentary election held between 23 August 1947 and 20 September 1947 for the district:

Candidate	Party	Symbol	Votes	%
S. W. R. D. Bandaranaike	United National Party	Hand	31,463	86.23
Chandra Gunasekera	Lanka Sama Samaja Party	Elephant	4,609	12.63
Valid Votes			36,072	98.86
Rejected Votes			417	1.14
Total Polled			36,489	100.00
Registered Electors			55,948	
Turnout				65.22

=== 1952 Parliamentary General Election ===
Results of the 2nd parliamentary election held between 24 May 1952 and 30 May 1952 for the district:

Candidate	Party	Symbol	Votes	%
S. W. R. D. Bandaranaike	Sri Lanka Freedom Party	Elephant	38,478	85.94
A. W. G. Seneviratne	United National Party	Star	5,934	13.25
Valid Votes			44,412	99.20
Rejected Votes			360	0.80
Total Polled			44,772	100.00
Registered Electors			58,322	
Turnout				76.77

=== 1956 Parliamentary General Election ===
Results of the 3rd parliamentary election held between 5 April 1956 and 10 April 1956 for the district:

Candidate	Party	Symbol	Votes	%
S. W. R. D. Bandaranaike	Sri Lanka Freedom Party	Hand	45,016	91.82
A. W. G. Seneviratne	United National Party	Elephant	3,019	6.16
I. Tinsi	Independent	Umbrella	621	1.27
Valid Votes			48,656	99.25
Rejected Votes			369	0.75
Total Polled			49,025	100.00
Registered Electors			64,310	
Turnout				76.23

=== 1960 (March) Parliamentary General Election ===
Results of the 4th parliamentary election held on 19 March 1960 for the district:

Candidate	Party	Symbol	Votes	%
James Peter Obeyesekere III	Sri Lanka Freedom Party	Hand	20,985	73.30
A. W. G. Seneviratne	United National Party	Elephant	5,668	19.80
Gemunu Kulasekera		Key	1,559	5.45
Mahanama Wickremasinghe		Orange	254	0.89
Valid Votes			28,466	99.43
Rejected Votes			162	0.57
Total Polled			28,628	100.00
Registered Electors			35,783	
Turnout				80.00

=== 1960 (July) Parliamentary General Election ===
Results of the 5th parliamentary election held on 20 July 1960 for the district:

Candidate	Party	Symbol	Votes	%
James Peter Obeyesekere III	Sri Lanka Freedom Party	Hand	22,491	81.84
A. W. G. Seneviratne	United National Party	Elephant	4,870	17.72
Valid Votes			27,361	99.56
Rejected Votes			121	0.44
Total Polled			27,482	100.00
Registered Electors			35,783	
Turnout				76.80

=== 1965 Parliamentary General Election ===
Results of the 6th parliamentary election held on 22 March 1965 for the district:

Candidate	Party	Symbol	Votes	%
Sirimavo Bandaranaike	Sri Lanka Freedom Party	Hand	26,150	71.88
A. W. G. Seneviratne	United National Party	Elephant	9,615	26.43
J. Kasturiarachi	Mahajana Eksath Peramuna	Cart Wheel	288	0.79
U.H.D.S. Wijetunga		Clock	185	0.51
Valid Votes			36,238	99.61
Rejected Votes			142	0.39
Total Polled			36,380	100.00
Registered Electors			42,735	
Turnout				85.13

=== 1970 Parliamentary General Election ===
Results of the 7th parliamentary election held on 27 May 1970 for the district:

Candidate	Party	Symbol	Votes	%
Sirimavo Bandaranaike	Sri Lanka Freedom Party	Hand	31,612	75.25
J. R. P. Suriyapperuma	United National Party	Elephant	9,889	23.54
R. A. D. W. Ratnasekera		Ship	349	0.83
Valid Votes			41,850	99.62
Rejected Votes			161	0.38
Total Polled			42,011	100.00
Registered Electors			48,908	
Turnout				85.90

=== 1977 Parliamentary General Election ===
Results of the 8th parliamentary election held on 21 July 1977 for the district:

Candidate	Party	Symbol	Votes	%
Sirimavo Bandaranaike	Sri Lanka Freedom Party	Hand	30,226	58.87
A. W. G. Seneviratne	United National Party	Elephant	19,563	38.10
Chandra Gunasekera	Lanka Sama Samaja Party	Key	1,067	2.08
T. A. D. K. Thambugala		Star	335	0.65
Valid Votes			51,191	99.70
Rejected Votes			152	0.30
Total Polled			51,343	100.00
Registered Electors			58,236	
Turnout				88.16
