= Madampagama =

Sri Lankan village

Coordinates: 6°13′N 80°04′E

Madampagama is a village in Galle District, Southern Province, Sri Lanka. It is famous for its coir works. Madampagama is near Ambalangoda and Hikkaduwa.

== Schools ==
Madampagama Central College is the most leading and popular mixed school situated in Madampagama. The other leading schools are Kuleegoda Vidyalaya & Kumara Kashyapa Vidyalaya.
