= Ingiriya Divisional Secretariat =

- Divisional Secretariat
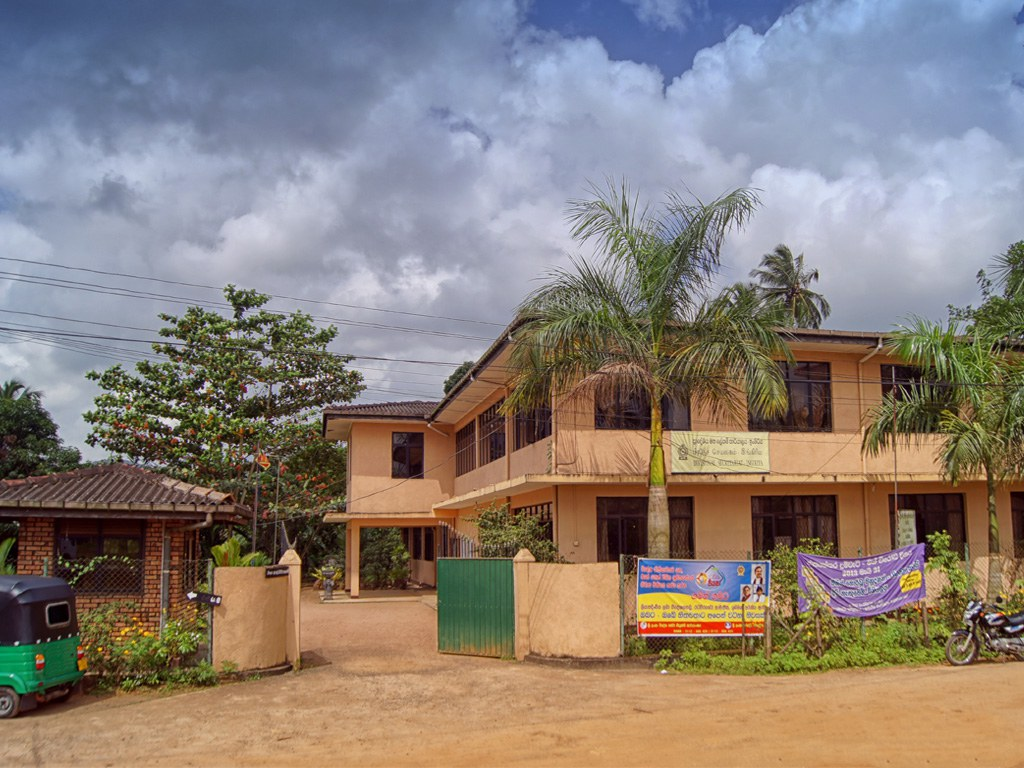
- Ingiriya Divisional Secretariat
- Interactive map of Ingiriya Divisional Secretariat
- Location within Sri Lanka
- Coordinates: 6°45′49″N 80°08′54″E
- Country: Sri Lanka
- Province: Western Province
- District: Kalutara District
- Time zone: UTC+5:30 (Sri Lanka Standard Time)
- Website: http://www.ingiriya.ds.gov.lk

Ingiriya Divisional Secretariat is a Divisional Secretariat of Kalutara District, of Western Province, Sri Lanka.

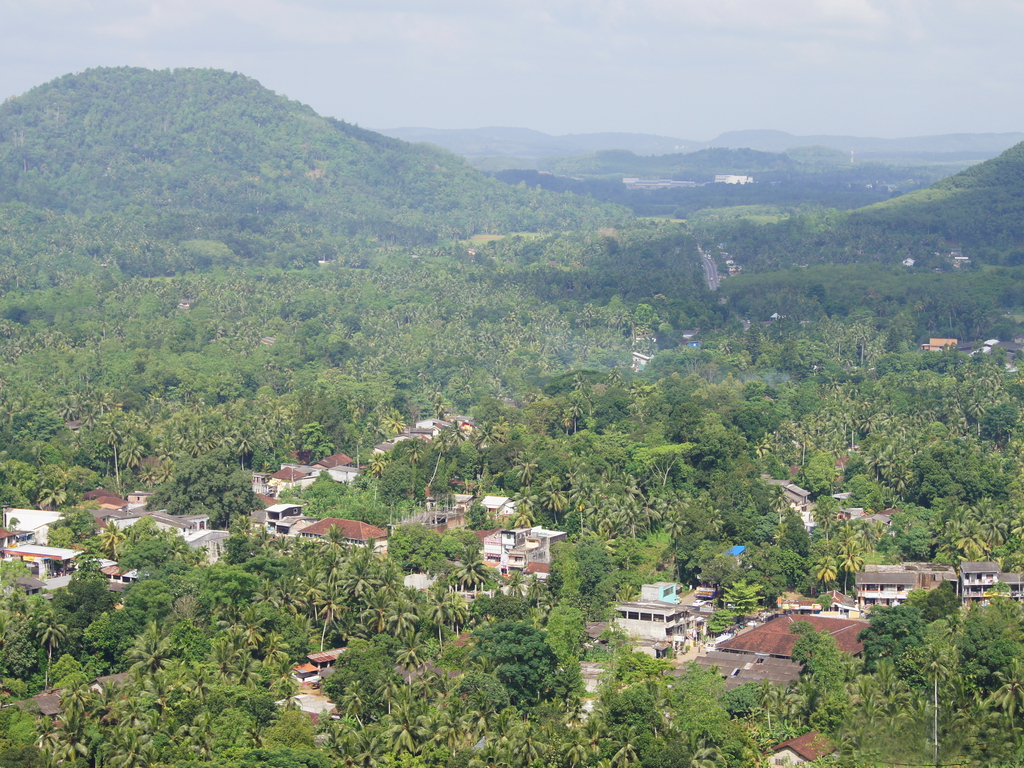
View of Ingiriya town
