= Robert Gunawardena =

Sri Lankan politician and diplomat (1904-1971)

Hon. Robert Gunawardena රොබට් ගුණවර්ධන

Member of the Ceylon Parliament for Kotte
- In office 1947–1960
- Succeeded by: Stanley Tillekeratne

Member of the Ceylon Parliament for Kottawa
- In office March 1960 – December 1964
- Succeeded by: Mahabalage Don Henry Jayawardena

Sri Lankan Ambassador to China
- In office 1965–1970
- Preceded by: Stephen Frederick de Silva
- Succeeded by: Yogendra Duraiswamy

Personal details
- Born: Don Benjamin Rupasinghe Gunawardena; 12 March 1904 Kosgama, British Ceylon
- Died: 26 December 1971 (aged 67) Kosgama, Sri Lanka
- Spouse: Seelakalyana Rupa née Kottegoda (1923-2025)
- Children: 4
- Parents: Don Jacolis Rupasinghe Gunawardena (father); Dona Liyanora née Gunasekera (mother)
- Relatives: Philip (brother), Caroline (sister)
- Education: Government School, Hanwella; Prince of Wales College, Moratuwa; Ananda College, Colombo; Agricultural School, Peradeniya

Don Benjamin Rupasinghe Gunawardena (12 March 1904 - 26 December 1971: Sinhala: රොබට් ගුණවර්ධන), popularly known as Robert Gunawardena, was a Sri Lankan Marxist politician and diplomat. He was one of the founders of the Lanka Sama Samaja Party, which was the first political party in Sri Lanka, and served as the long time MP for Kotte. He was the leader of the Suriya-Mal Movement and served as ambassador to China between 1965 and 1970.

== Early life and education ==
Robert was born on 12 March 1904, to an affluent family in Kosgama, Sri Lanka. The fourth of seven children of Don Jacolis Rupasinghe Gunawardena, known as Boralugoda Ralahamy, and Dona Liyanora née Gunasekera, he was the younger brother of Harry and Philip. He attended the government school in Hanwella for his primary education and went on to the Prince of Wales' College, Moratuwa however following his father's false arrest for allegedly being an agitator in the 1915 Ceylonese riots the family decided to withdraw the brothers from the school and enroll them at Ananda College, Colombo. In addition to education, he played cricket, volleyball, and was a member of the Cadet Corps from 1922 to 1923.

In the late 1920s Harry, Robert and their younger sister Caroline became active in nationalist youth groups which were demanding democratic reforms with the ultimate goal of complete independence.

Robert was married to Seelakalyana Rupa Kottegoda who was born in Kothhena, Kottegoda, Badulla. She was studied in Tebuwana School, Panadura Sri Sumangala Balika Vidyalaya, St. Bridget's Convent, Colombo and Visakha Vidyalaya, Colombo. Their parents opposed the marriage particularly Rupa's mother's only younger brother, Dr. M. V. P. Peiris who later became the Minister of Health. However, Robert and Rupa were married on 7 March 1947, when Rupa was 23 years old and Robert was 43 years old. The couple had two daughters: Sriyani, Yasomi; and two sons: Vijith and Rohith. Rupa contested the Kolonnawa electorate from the Lanka Sama Samaja Party in the 1960 general election.

On the morning of 27 December 1971, Robert inspected a banana plantation in the morning and came home at around 11:00 am saying that he was ill. Rupa arranged for him to be hospitalised, but he was reluctant to go to the hospital and died at home.

== Political career ==
In 1931 he campaigned for the Universal suffrage and formed The Cosmopolitan Crew of Lauries Road, Bambalapkiya Association. In 1935 he was an activist in Colombo Youth League and one of the founders of the Lanka Sama Samaja Party. Then in 1938, he slipped out from British Ceylon to the British Raj and was delegate to Indian National Congress in Haripura. In 1942, Robert was arrested in British India and brought to Ceylon where he was jailed from 1942 to 1945.

After released from jail, he led the 1953 Ceylonese Hartal in 1953. The government issued a warrant for Robert's arrest and ordered DIG Sidney Zoysa to kill him or bring him to Army Headquarters. Robert hid with his faithful friend Danny Hettiarachchi. At the same time, Zoysa surrounded Robert's garden on false rumors that 500 guns were hidden. Later in 1947, Robert was elected as the Member of Parliament for the Kotte Electoral District and remained its elected member until 1960. However he left the Lanka Sama Samaja Party, joined the Mahajana Eksath Peramuna and was elected representing the Kottawa Electoral District in 1960 and remained its elected member until 1964. In 1964 he left the Mahajana Eksath Peramuna and became the leader of the Suiyamal Movement.

Robert lost the first general election in 1965, and then received a message from Prime Minister Dudley Senanayake to be an ambassador. In 1965 he was elected as a member of the Colombo Municipal Council. From 1965 to 1970, Robert was ambassador in Beijing.

== See also ==
- List of Sri Lankan non-career diplomats
