= List of justices of the Supreme Court of Sri Lanka =

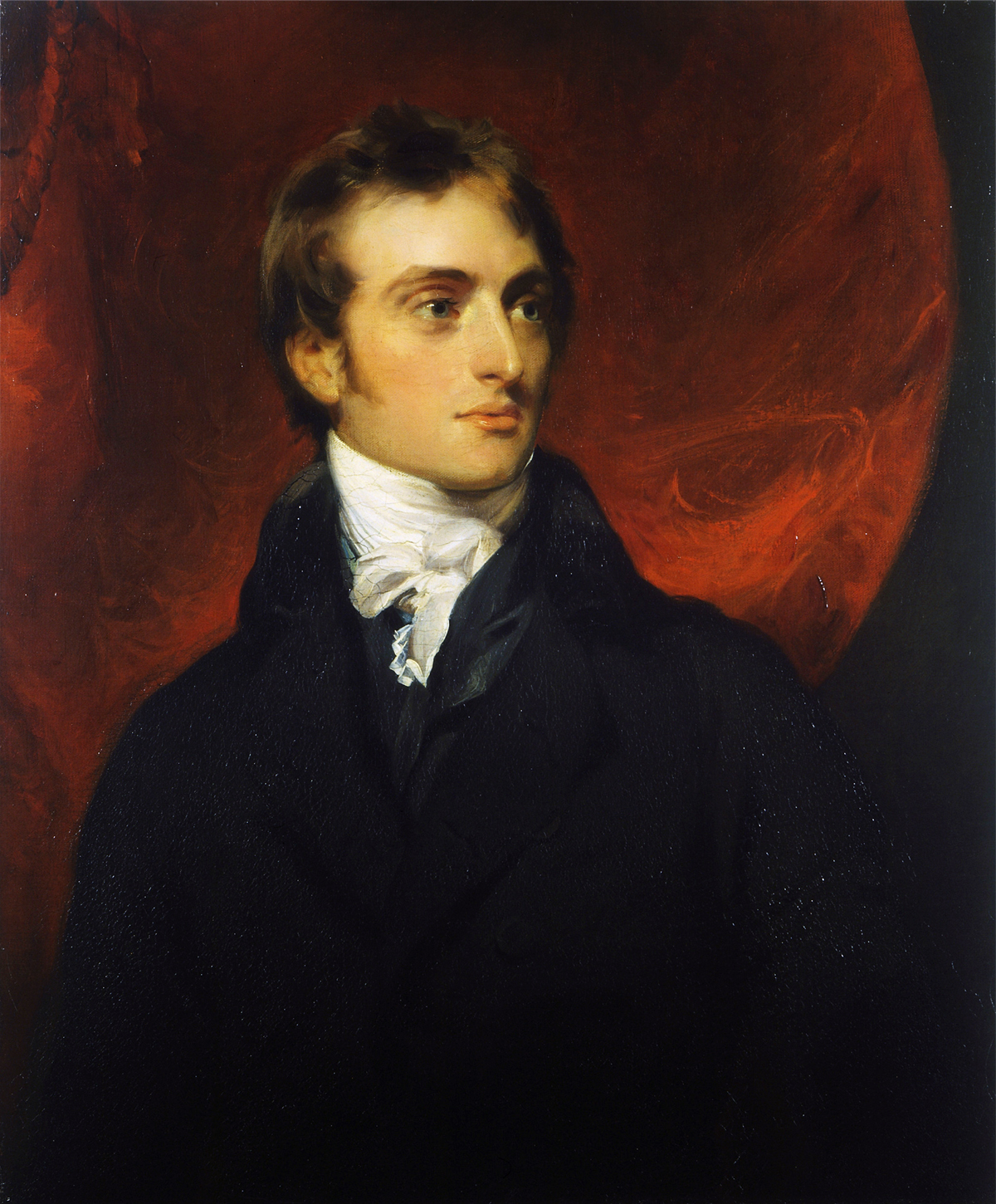
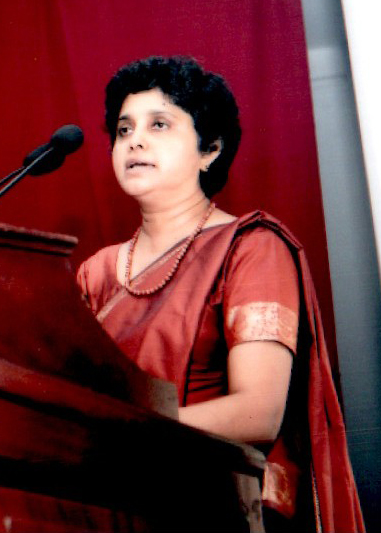
- Top left: Codrington Edmund Carrington was the first Chief Justice of British Ceylon.
- Top right: Shirani Bandaranayake was the 43rd Chief Justice and the first woman to hold the position.

This is a list of justices of the Supreme Court of Sri Lanka. They are listed in the order in which they took the judicial oath of office and commenced their term.

== List of justices ==
=== 19th century ===
As of 28 February 2025

List of justices appointed to the Supreme Court: 1800–1899
No.	Name	Appointed by	Start / end / length of service	
No.	Name	Appointed by	Puisne Justice	Chief Justice
1	Codrington Edmund Carrington	North	—N/a	1st Chief Justice; March 1801 – 2 April 1806
2	Edmund Henry Lushington	North	5 September 1801 – 15 April 1807; 5 years, 222 days	2nd Chief Justice; 15 April 1807 – 1809
3	Alexander Johnston	Maitland	15 April 1807 – 14 February 1809; 1 year, 305 days	3rd Chief Justice; 6 November 1811 – 1819
4	William Coke	Maitland	6 March 1809 – 1 September 1818; 9 years, 179 days	6 March 1809 – 1811 (Note: Provisional Chief Justice.)
5	Henry Byrne	Brownrigg	5 November 1818 – 1819	—N/a
6	Ambrose Hardinge Giffard	Brownrigg	—N/a	4th Chief Justice; 8 April 1819 – 2 March 1827; 7 years, 328 days
7	Richard Ottley	Barnes (Note: The appointment was made in the capacity of acting governor.)	8 May 1820 – 1 November 1827; 7 years, 177 days	5th Chief Justice; 1 November 1827 – 1833
8	Henry Matthews	Barnes	10 October 1827 – 1828	—N/a
9	Charles Marshall	Barnes	14 June 1828 – 18 February 1833; 4 years, 249 days	6th Chief Justice; 18 February 1833 – 3 March 1836; 3 years, 14 days
10	William Rough	Wilmot-Horton	18 February 1833 — 1838	—N/a
11	William Norris	Wilmot-Horton	1834 – 27 April 1836	7th Chief Justice; 27 April 1836 – 1837
12	John Jeremie	Wilmot-Horton	10 March 1836 – 1840	—N/a
13	John Fredrick Stoddart	Stewart-Mackenzie	2 June 1838 – 19 August 1839; 1 year, 78 days	—N/a
14	Anthony Oliphant	Stewart-Mackenzie	—N/a	8th Chief Justice; 22 October 1838 – 1854
15	J. G. Hillebrand	Stewart-Mackenzie	23 November 1839 – 1841 (Note: Acting puisne justice.)	—N/a
16	William Ogle Carr	Stewart-Mackenzie	19 December 1839 – 17 April 1854; 14 years, 119 days	9th Chief Justice; 17 April 1854 – 1856
17	John Stark	Stewart-Mackenzie	10 October 1840 – ?	—N/a
18	Christopher Temple	Anderson	28 January 1854 – 1873	—N/a
19	Paul Ivy Sterling	Ward	20 November 1855 – ?	—N/a
20	William Carpenter Rowe	Ward	—N/a	10th Chief Justice; 1857 – 1859
21	Edward Shepherd Creasy	Ward	—N/a	11th Chief Justice; 27 March 1860 – 1875
22	Richard Morgan	Ward	1 January – 19 November 1857; 322 days 1 January – 6 November 1860; 310 days	—N/a
23	George Lawson	Ward	1860 – 1861; 1871 – 1872	—N/a
24	Henry Byerley Thomson	MacCarthy	1 January 1863 – 1866	—N/a
25	Charles Henry Stewart	Robinson	11 January 1867 – 1879 (Note: On leave (1 January – 28 April 1871).)	—N/a
26	Richard Cayley	Gregory	26 July 1874 – 1 October 1879; 5 years, 67 days	14th Chief Justice; 1 October 1879 – 1882
27	Lovell Burchett Clarence	Gregory	4 April 1876 – 1888	—N/a
28	Harry Dias Bandaranaike	Gregory; Longden	1876; 5 July 1879 – 1892	1–12 October 1879 (Note: Acting Chief Justice.); 9 January – 5 June 1888
29	William Hackett	Gregory	—N/a	12th Chief Justice; 3 February – 17 May 1877; 103 days
30	John Budd Phear	Longden	—N/a	13th Chief Justice; 18 October 1877 – 30 September 1879; 1 year, 347 days
31	Archibald Campbell Lawrie	Longden	1 July – 13 November 1877; 6 July 1892 – 1901	—N/a
32	Jacobus de Wet	Longden	—N/a	15th Chief Justice; 31 May 1882 – 29 May 1883; 363 days
33	Bruce Burnside	Longden	—N/a	16th Chief Justice; 21 May 1883 – 1893 (Note: On leave (25 November 1890 – February 1891).)
34	John Winfield Bonser	Havelock	—N/a	17th Chief Justice; 13 November 1893 – 1902
35	George Henry Withers	Havelock	6 July 1892 – 1900	—N/a
36	Dodwell Browne	Havelock	1895	—N/a

=== 20th century ===
As of 28 February 2025

List of justices appointed to the Supreme Court: 1900–1999
No.	Name	Appointed by	Start / end / length of service	
No.	Name	Appointed by	Puisne Justice	Chief Justice
37	Frederick Charles Moncrieff	Ridgeway	4 April 1900 – 1905	—N/a
38	Henry Lorensz Wendt	Ridgeway	15 October 1901 – 28 November 1910; 9 years, 44 days	—N/a
39	John Page Middleton	Ridgeway	28 January 1902 – 1912	—N/a
40	Charles Layard	Ridgeway	—N/a	18th Chief Justice; 26 April 1902 – 18 June 1906; 4 years, 53 days
41	Joseph Richard Grenier	Ridgeway	28 November 1910 – 1912 (Note: Acting puisne justice (12 May 1903 – 28 November 1910))	—N/a
42	Alexander Wood Renton	Blake	3 September 1905 – 1914	21st Chief Justice; 22 August 1914 – 1918
43	Joseph Turner Hutchinson	Blake	—N/a	19th Chief Justice; 23 October 1906 – 1 May 1911; 4 years, 190 days
44	Alfred Lascelles	McCallum	—N/a	20th Chief Justice; 1 May 1911 – 1914
45	Walter Pereira	McCallum	4 July 1912 –	—N/a
46	James Van Langenberg	McCallum	1912–1915	—N/a
47	George Francis Macdaniel Ennis	McCallum	5 August 1912 – 1925	—N/a
48	Walter Shaw	Chalmers	10 December 1914 – 1921	—N/a
49	Thomas de Sampayo	Chalmers	1915–	—N/a
50	Stewart Schneider	Anderson	1917–	—N/a
51	Anton Bertram	Stubbs	—N/a	22nd Chief Justice; 26 July 1918 – 1925
52	Hermann Albert Loos	Manning	1919–1920	—N/a
53	William Thomas Porter	Manning	12 January 1922 –	—N/a
54	Thomas Garvin	Manning	21 June 1921 – 1935	—N/a
55	John Adrian St. Valentine Jayewardene	Manning	1923–	—N/a
56	Llewelyn Dalton	Manning	14 March 1925 –	—N/a
57	Charles Ernest St. John Branch	Clementi	—N/a	23rd Chief Justice; 3 July 1925 – 25 May 1926; 326 days
58	Robert Lyall-Grant	Clifford	17 February 1926 –	—N/a
59	Stanley Fisher	Clifford	—N/a	24th Chief Justice; 11 December 1926 – 1930
60	Allen Drieberg	Fletcher	19 September 1927 –	—N/a
61	Eugene Wilfred Jayewardene	Fletcher	May 1928 –	—N/a
62	Philip James Macdonell	Stanley	—N/a	25th Chief Justice; 3 October 1930 – 1936
63	William Edward Barber	Thomson	1932–	—N/a
64	Lucien Macull Dominic de Silva	Stubbs	1933–1934	—N/a
65	Lewis Matthew Maartensz	Stubbs	18 February 1935 –	—N/a
66	Maas Thajoon Akbar			—N/a
67	Francis Harold Bertram	Stubbs	19 February 1935 –	—N/a
68	Kenneth Poyser		–1939	—N/a
69	Francis Soertsz	Stubbs	12 November 1936 –	—N/a
70	Sidney Abrahams	Stubbs	—N/a	26th Chief Justice; 3 July 1936 – 1939
71	Francis Moseley	Stubbs	2 August 1936 –	—N/a
72	Vincent Fernando	Caldecott	11 November 1937 –	—N/a
73	Hector Hearne	Stubbs	21 May 1937 – 1944	—N/a
74	Arthur Eric Keuneman	Caldecott	4 March 1938 –	—N/a
75	Oswald Leslie De Kretser II	Caldecott	8 April 1938 – 1945	—N/a
76	Arthur Wijewardena	Caldecott	22 August 1938 – 15 January 1949; 10 years, 146 days	28th Chief Justice; 15 January 1949 – 1950
77	John Harry Barclay Nihill	Caldecott	18 November 1938 –	—N/a
78	John Curtois Howard	Caldecott	—N/a	27th Chief Justice; 1 December 1939 – 1949
79	George Harry Franklyn Cannon	Caldecott	1939–1947	—N/a
80	Edward Jayetileke	Caldecott	14 May 1942 – 1950	29th Chief Justice; 1950 – 11 October 1951
81	Alan Rose	Moore	11 January 1945 – 11 October 1951; 6 years, 273 days	30th Chief Justice; 11 October 1951 – 1956
82	A. R. H. Canakeratne	Moore	28 March 1945 –	—N/a
83	M. W. H. de Silva	Moore		—N/a
84	Felix Reginald Dias Bandaranaike II	Moore	3 September 1946 –	—N/a
85	C. Nagalingam	Moore	22 July 1947 – 1958	—N/a
86	Ralph Windham	Moore	23 July 1947 – 1950	—N/a
87	Hema Henry Basnayake	Moore	23 October 1947 – 1 January 1956; 8 years, 70 days	31st Chief Justice; 1 January 1956 – 3 August 1964; 8 years, 215 days
88	Noel Gratiaen	Moore	22 March 1948 – 2 May 1956; 8 years, 41 days	—N/a
89	E. H. T. Gunasekera	Moore	1 March 1949 – 25 January 1962; 12 years, 330 days	—N/a
90	M. F. S. Pulle	Ramsbotham	28 September 1949 –	—N/a
91	V. L. St. C. Swan	Ramsbotham	1 May 1950 –	—N/a
92	H. A. de Silva	Ramsbotham	30 November 1950 –	—N/a
93	N. K. Choksy	Ramsbotham	1951–	—N/a
94	Henry Weerasooriya	Ramsbotham	10 July 1953 – 24 February 1964; 10 years, 229 days	—N/a
95	K. D. de Silva	Ramsbotham	10 July 1953 –	—N/a
96	Miliani Sansoni	Ramsbotham	10 May 1954 – 3 August 1964; 10 years, 85 days	32nd Chief Justice; 3 August 1964 – 17 November 1966; 2 years, 106 days
97	Hugh Fernando	Goonetilleke	16 May 1955 – 20 November 1966; 11 years, 188 days	33rd Chief Justice; 20 November 1966 – 17 November 1973; 6 years, 362 days
98	T. S. Fernando	Goonetilleke	2 May 1956 –	—N/a
99	Nadaraja Sinnetamby	Goonetilleke	3 May 1956 –	—N/a
100	Lionel de Silva	Goonetilleke	5 November 1959 –	—N/a
101	Henry Thambiah	Goonetilleke	1 December 1961 – 27 May 1968; 6 years, 178 days	—N/a
102	Kingsley Herath	Goonetilleke	25 January 1962 –	—N/a
103	A. W. H. Abeyesundere	Gopallawa	20 April 1962 – 3 May 1968; 6 years, 13 days	—N/a
104	P. Sriskandarajah	Gopallawa	22 June 1962 – 8 February 1967; 4 years, 231 days	—N/a
105	Gardiye Punchihewage Amaraseela Silva	Gopallawa	22 June 1962 – 1973	34th Chief Justice; 1973–1974
106	Lionel Sirimanne	Gopallawa		—N/a
107	V. Manicavasagar	Gopallawa	17 December 1964 – 14 December 1967; 2 years, 362 days	—N/a
108	Eugene Reginald de Fonseka	Gopallawa		—N/a
109	A. C. Alles	Gopallawa	1964–1974	—N/a
110	V. Sivasubramaniam	Gopallawa	1966–1970	—N/a
111	Leonard de Silva	Gopallawa	16 August 1966 –	—N/a
112	George Samerawickrame	Gopallawa	18 November 1966 – 9 April 1981; 14 years, 142 days	—N/a
113	Victor Tennekoon	Gopallawa	8 February 1967 – 1 July 1970; 3 years, 143 days	35th Chief Justice; 1 January 1974 – 8 September 1977; 3 years, 250 days
114	Christopher Weeramantry	Gopallawa	1967 – 30 April 1972	—N/a
115	Oswald Leslie De Kretser III	Gopallawa	1968 – 21 January 1972	—N/a
116	Samarapilimudalige Wijayatilake	Gopallawa	1968 – 16 May 1975	—N/a
117	Pandita Gunawadena	Gopallawa	1968 – 10 February 1971	—N/a
118	Vincent Thamotheram	Gopallawa	23 March 1970 – 1980	—N/a
119	Hector Deheragoda	Gopallawa	22 February 1972 – 27 December 1976; 4 years, 309 days	—N/a
120	Cuda Banda Walgampaya	Gopallawa	22 February 1972 – 3 January 1976; 3 years, 315 days	—N/a
121	Jaya Pathirana	Gopallawa	22 February 1972 – 1978	—N/a
122	Dharmadasa Wimalaratne	Gopallawa	10 April 1972 – 15 September 1985; 13 years, 158 days	—N/a
123	Tellipalai Rajaratnam	Gopallawa	10 April 1972 – 1978	—N/a
124	Donald Sirimanne	Gopallawa	1973 –	—N/a
125	Cyril Udalagama	Gopallawa	1 January 1974 –	—N/a
126	T. A. de S. Wijesundera	Gopallawa	1 January 1974 –	—N/a
127	Malcolm Perera	Gopallawa	1 January 1974 –	—N/a
128	Izadean Mohamed Ismail	Gopallawa	1 January 1974 – 18 December 1981; 7 years, 351 days	—N/a
129	Joe Weereratne	Gopallawa	1 January 1974 –	—N/a
130	Arulampalam Vythialingam	Gopallawa	1 January 1974 –	—N/a
131	Noel Tittawela	Gopallawa	1 January 1974 –	—N/a
132	Suppiah Sharvananda	Gopallawa	1 January 1974 – 29 October 1984; 10 years, 302 days	37th Chief Justice; 29 October 1984 – 22 February 1988; 3 years, 116 days
133	Somaratne Walpita	Gopallawa	1 January 1974 –	—N/a
134	Wilmot Gunasekera	Gopallawa	2 May 1974 –	—N/a
135	Barnes Ratwatte II	Gopallawa	2 December 1974 – 22 November 1983; 8 years, 355 days	—N/a
136	Raja Wanasundera	Gopallawa	5 June 1975 –	—N/a
137	Percy Colin-Thomé	Gopallawa	12 January 1976 –	—N/a
138	Neville Samarakoon	Jayewardene	—N/a	36th Chief Justice; 1977 – 21 October 1984
139	Victor Perera	Jayewardene	24 July 1981 – 18 August 1983; 2 years, 25 days	—N/a
140	J. F. A. Soza	Jayewardene	26 January 1982 – 3 February 1984; 2 years, 8 days	—N/a
141	Parinda Ranasinghe	Jayewardene	15 November 1982 – 1988	38th Chief Justice; 1988–1991
142	Abdul Cader	Jayewardene	8 December 1982 – 28 May 1985; 2 years, 171 days	—N/a
143	Heevi Rodrigo	Jayewardene	8 December 1982 – 4 December 1984; 1 year, 362 days	—N/a
144	E. A. D. Atukorale	Jayewardene	27 November 1984 –	—N/a
145	Herbert Thambiah	Jayewardene	27 November 1984 – 1991	39th Chief Justice; 1991 – 14 October 1991
146	Lucian de Alwis	Jayewardene	27 November 1984 –	—N/a
147	O. S. M. Seneviratne	Jayewardene	10 February 1986 – 1989	—N/a
148	H. A. G. de Silva	Jayewardene	10 February 1986 –	—N/a
149	Mark Fernando	Jayewardene	4 March 1988 – 2005	—N/a
150	K. M. M. B. Kulatunga	Premadasa	1989–	—N/a
151	A. R. B. Amerasinghe	Premadasa		—N/a
152	A. R. N. Fernando	Premadasa		—N/a
153	Ameer Ismail	Premadasa	1990–1994	—N/a
154	Andrew Ranjan Perera	Premadasa		—N/a
155	P. Ramanathan	Premadasa		—N/a
156	G. P. S. de Silva	Premadasa	—N/a	40th Chief Justice; 1991–1999
157	Sarath N. Silva	Kumaratunga	1995 – 16 September 1999	41st Chief Justice; 16 September 1999 – 7 June 2009; 9 years, 264 days
158	Shirani Bandaranayake (Note: Shirani Bandaranayake was impeached by Parliament on 11 January 2013, with 155 votes in favour and 49 against. She was subsequently removed from office on 13 January 2013 after President Mahinda Rajapaksa ratified the impeachment motion.) (Note: Following the election of President Maithripala Sirisena, the government declared Mohan Peiris's appointment as Chief Justice void ab initio, leading to his removal from office and the reinstatement of Shirani Bandaranayake.)	Kumaratunga	30 October 1996 – 18 May 2011; 14 years, 200 days	43rd Chief Justice; 18 May 2011 – 13 January 2013; 1 year, 240 days 28–29 January 2015; 1 day
159	Asoka De Zoysa Gunawardana	Kumaratunga	1996–1999	—N/a

=== 21st century ===
Current Chief Justice
Current Justices

As of 19 May 2026

List of justices appointed to the Supreme Court: 2000–present
No.	Name	Appointed by	Start / end / length of service		Ref.
No.	Name	Appointed by	Puisne Justice	Chief Justice	Ref.
160	C. V. Vigneswaran	Kumaratunga	March 2001 – October 2004	—N/a	
161	Asoka de Silva	Kumaratunga	1 August 2001 – 8 June 2009; 7 years, 311 days	42nd Chief Justice; 8 June 2009 – 17 May 2011; 1 year, 343 days	
162	Chandra Nihal Jayasinghe	Kumaratunga	19 February 2003 – 29 February 2008; 5 years, 10 days	—N/a	
163	Nimal Dissanayake	Kumaratunga	? – 23 April 2008	—N/a	
164	Shiranee Tilakawardane	Kumaratunga	19 February 2003 – 5 April 2014; 11 years, 45 days	—N/a	
165	Nimal Gamini Amaratunga	Kumaratunga	January 2005 – March 2014	—N/a	
166	Saleem Marsoof	Kumaratunga	January 2005 – December 2014	—N/a	
167	Andrew Somawansa	M. Rajapaksa	28 May 2006 – October 2008	—N/a	
168	Jagath Balapatabendi	M. Rajapaksa		—N/a	
169	K. Sripavan	M. Rajapaksa	27 March 2008 – 30 January 2015; 6 years, 309 days	44th Chief Justice; 30 January 2015 – 28 February 2017; 2 years, 29 days	
170	P. A. Ratnayake	M. Rajapaksa	2 May 2008 – 15 February 2013; 4 years, 289 days	—N/a	
171	Chandra Ekanayake	M. Rajapaksa	November 2008 – March 2016	—N/a	
172	S. I. Imam	M. Rajapaksa	9 January 2009 – 20 February 2020; 11 years, 42 days	—N/a	
173	R. K. S. Suresh Chandra	M. Rajapaksa	17 June 2010 – July 2012	—N/a	
174	Sathya Hettige	M. Rajapaksa	10 July 2011 – 18 April 2014; 2 years, 282 days	—N/a	
175	Priyasath Dep	M. Rajapaksa	10 July 2011 – 1 March 2017; 5 years, 234 days	45th Chief Justice; 1 March 2017 – 12 October 2018; 1 year, 225 days	
176	Eva Wanasundera	M. Rajapaksa	7 July 2012 – 14 December 2018; 6 years, 160 days	—N/a	
—N/a	Mohan Peiris	M. Rajapaksa	—N/a	15 January 2013 – 28 January 2015; 2 years, 13 days	
177	Rohini Marasinghe	M. Rajapaksa	26 April 2013 – November 2015	—N/a	
178	Buwaneka Aluwihare	M. Rajapaksa	4 December 2013 – January 2024	—N/a	
179	Sisira de Abrew	M. Rajapaksa	7 May 2014 – 2 June 2021; 7 years, 26 days	—N/a	
180	Sarath de Abrew	M. Rajapaksa	7 May 2014 – January 2016	—N/a	
181	Priyantha Jayawardena	M. Rajapaksa	7 May 2014 – February 2024	—N/a	
182	Upali Abeyratne	M. Rajapaksa	17 December 2014 – August 2017	—N/a	
183	Anil Goonaratne	Sirisena	30 January 2015 – December 2017	—N/a	
184	K. T. Chitrasiri	Sirisena	3 December 2015 – February 2018	—N/a	
185	Nalin Perera	Sirisena	3 March 2016 – 12 October 2018; 2 years, 223 days	46th Chief Justice; 12 October 2018 – 29 April 2019; 199 days	
186	Prasanna Jayawardena	Sirisena	16 June 2016 – 24 December 2019; 3 years, 191 days	—N/a	
187	Vijith Malalgoda	Sirisena	May 2017 – 19 August 2024	—N/a	
188	Lalith Dehideniya	Sirisena	16 January 2018 – 2023	—N/a	
189	Murdu Fernando	Sirisena	9 March 2018 – 2 December 2024; 6 years, 268 days	48th Chief Justice; 2 December 2024 – 27 July 2025; 237 days	
190	Padman Surasena	Sirisena	9 January 2019 – 27 July 2025; 6 years, 199 days	49th Chief Justice; 27 July 2025 – present 1 year, 76 days	
191	S. Thurairaja	Sirisena	9 January 2019 – 19 March 2026; 7 years, 69 days	—N/a	
192	Gamini Amarasekera	Sirisena	9 January 2019 – 20 June 2025; 6 years, 162 days	—N/a	
193	Jayantha Jayasuriya	Sirisena	—N/a	47th Chief Justice; 29 April 2019 – 10 October 2024; 5 years, 164 days	
194	Yasantha Kodagoda	G. Rajapaksa	20 March 2020 – present 6 years, 205 days	—N/a	
195	Dilip Nawaz	G. Rajapaksa	1 December 2020 – present 5 years, 314 days	—N/a	
196	Kumudini Wickremasinghe	G. Rajapaksa	1 December 2020 – 3 April 2026; 5 years, 123 days	—N/a	
197	Shiran Gooneratne	G. Rajapaksa	1 December 2020 – present 5 years, 314 days	—N/a	
198	Janak de Silva	G. Rajapaksa	1 December 2020 – present 5 years, 314 days	—N/a	
199	Achala Wengappuli	G. Rajapaksa	1 December 2020 – present 5 years, 314 days	—N/a	
200	Mahinda Samayawardhena	G. Rajapaksa	1 December 2020 – present 5 years, 314 days	—N/a	
201	Arjuna Obeyesekere	G. Rajapaksa	14 June 2021 – present 5 years, 119 days	—N/a	
202	Priyantha Fernando	Wickremesinghe	6 February 2023 – 8 May 2026; 3 years, 91 days	—N/a	
203	Sobitha Rajakaruna	Dissanayake	12 January 2025 – present 1 year, 272 days	—N/a	
204	Menaka Wijesundara	Dissanayake	12 January 2025 – present 1 year, 272 days	—N/a	
205	Sampath B. Abeykoon	Dissanayake	12 January 2025 – present 1 year, 272 days	—N/a	
206	Sampath Wijeratne	Dissanayake	12 January 2025 – present 1 year, 272 days	—N/a	
207	Gihan Kulatunga	Dissanayake	10 December 2025 – present 305 days	—N/a	

== See also ==
- List of justices of the Supreme Court of Sri Lanka by court composition

== Notes ==
"Supreme Court of Sri Lanka – Judges of the Court". supremecourt.lk. 2025.
