= S. Thurairaja =

Puisne justice of the Supreme Court of Sri Lanka (2019–2026)

S. Thurairaja PC
- எஸ். துரைராஜா

Puisne Justice of the Supreme Court of Sri Lanka
- In office 9 January 2019 – 19 March 2026
- Appointed by: Maithripala Sirisena
- Preceded by: K. T. Chitrasiri

Judge of the Court of Appeal of Sri Lanka
- In office 15 September 2016 – 9 January 2019

Personal details
- Born: Sithambarampillai Thurairaja; 19 March 1961 (age 65) Central Province, Sri Lanka
- Education: University of Colombo; University of London
- Profession: Lawyer

Sithambarampillai Thurairaja, PC (Tamil: சிதம்பரப்பிள்ளை துரைராஜா, romanized: Citamparappiḷḷai Turairājā; born 19 March 1961) is a Sri Lankan lawyer who served as a puisne justice of the Supreme Court of Sri Lanka from 9 January 2019 to 19 March 2026. He was appointed by President Maithripala Sirisena.

He was formerly a justice of the Court of Appeal of Sri Lanka and High Court of Fiji.

== Early life ==
Thurairaja was educated at Saraswathy Maha Vidyalayam in Pussellawa and St. Anthony's College, Kandy. He has a Bachelor of Laws degree from the University of Colombo and a Master of Laws degree from the University of London. He also holds diplomas in forensic medicine, business information technology and computer appliances.

== Career ==
Thurairaja qualified as an attorney-at-law in 1988 and joined the Attorney General's Department in 1989. He rose up the ranks to become Senior State Counsel, Deputy Solicitor General and Additional Solicitor General. He was a high court judge in Fiji. He was appointed President's Counsel in 2016.

Thurairaja was appointed to the Court of Appeal of Sri Lanka in September 2016, becoming the first Indian Tamil to be appointed to the court. In October 2018 the Constitutional Council recommended that Thurairaja be appointed to the Supreme Court. President Maithripala Sirisena refused to follow the recommendation and suggested alternative names but in January 2019 the Constitutional Council reconfirmed its recommendation of Thurairaja. He was sworn in as a justice of the Supreme Court on 9 January 2019.

Thurairaja retired on 19 March 2026. In Sri Lanka, the mandatory retirement age for a puisne justice of the Supreme Court or the chief justice is 65 years.

=== Commission assignments ===
In September 2025, Thurairaja was appointed by President Anura Kumara Dissanayake as a member of the Judicial Service Commission (JSC), filling the vacancy created by the retirement of former Chief Justice Murdu Fernando.

== Notes ==
- "Hon. Justice S. Thurairaja, PC". Supreme Court of Sri Lanka. Archived from the original on 23 March 2026.
