= Sisira de Abrew =

Sri Lankan judge

Puisne Justice of the Supreme Court of Sri Lanka
- Incumbent
- Assumed office 7 May 2014
- Appointed by: Mahinda Rajapaksa
- Preceded by: Nimal Gamini Amaratunga

President of the Court of Appeal of Sri Lanka

Judge of the Court of Appeal of Sri Lanka
- In office 20 January 2005 – ?

High Court Judge of Sri Lanka
- In office 10 September 1998 – ?

Personal details
- Born: Balapitiya, Southern Province, Sri Lanka
- Education: Dharmasoka College; Sri Lanka Law College

Kulahath Sisira Jayawilal de Abrew is a sitting Puisne Justice of the Supreme Court of Sri Lanka who was appointed by President Mahinda Rajapaksa in 2014 to replace Justice Nimal Gamini Amaratunga. In May 2016, de Abrew was appointed to the Judicial Service Commission by President Maithripala Sirisena.

de Abrew comes from a Buddhist family in Ratmalana, Western Province, Sri Lanka. He had his early education at Dharmasoka College and graduated to the Sri Lanka Law College in 1978. He was called to the Bar in 1981. de Abrew joined the Attorney General's Department in 1982 and was promoted as senior state counsel in 1996. In 1998 he was appointed a High Court Judge, where he served in Ampara, Kandy, Anuradhapura and Colombo. In 2005 he was appointed as a Judge of the Court of Appeal of Sri Lanka, and soon became the President of the Court.

Legal offices
Preceded by Nimal Gamini Amaratunga	Puisne Justice of the Supreme Court of Sri Lanka; 2014– present	Incumbent
Preceded by	President of the Court of Appeal of Sri Lanka –	Succeeded by
Preceded by	Judge of the Court of Appeal of Sri Lanka; 2005–?	Succeeded by
Preceded by	High Court Judge of Sri Lanka for Ampara, Kandy, Anuradhapura, Colombo; 1998–?	Succeeded by
