= Nalin Perera (judge) =

Chief Justice of Sri Lanka from 2018 to 2019

46th Chief Justice of Sri Lanka
- In office 12 October 2018 – 29 April 2019
- Appointed by: Maithripala Sirisena
- Preceded by: Priyasath Dep
- Succeeded by: Jayantha Jayasuriya

Puisne Justice of the Supreme Court of Sri Lanka
- In office 3 March 2016 – 12 October 2018
- Appointed by: Maithripala Sirisena
- Preceded by: Sarath de Abrew

Judge of the Court of Appeal of Sri Lanka
- In office July 2011 – 3 March 2016

High Court Judge
- In office July 2001 – July 2011

District Court Judge
- In office July 1990 – July 2001

Magistrate's Court Judge
- In office May 1984 – July 1990

Primary Court Judge
- In office March 1980 – May 1984

Personal details
- Born: 29 April 1954 (age 72)
- Education: Sri Lanka Law College

Hettikankanange Nalin Jayalath Perera (born 29 April 1954) is a Sri Lanka judge who served as the 46th Chief Justice of Sri Lanka.

== Education and early career ==
Educated at St. Thomas' College, Kotte and S. Thomas' College, Gurutalawa, he studied law at the Sri Lanka Law College, passing out in 1977. His contemporaries included Mahinda Rajapaksa and Jeyaraj Fernandopulle. Having taken oaths as an attorney-at-law, he worked under Daya Perera.

== Judicial career ==
=== Lower courts ===
Perera served as a Primary Court judge from 1980, in Embilipitiya and Welimada. In 1984, he was appointed as a Magistrate. He functioned as the Magistrate of Mount-Lavinia, Walasmulla, Kalutara and Colombo Fort. He became a District Judge in 1990.

=== High court ===
In 2001 he was appointed a High Court Judge and served in Ratnapura, Kandy and Nuwara Eliya. He served as a Criminal High Court judge and became one of the first High Court Judges appointed to the newly formed Civil Appellate High Courts in Kandy. While High Court Judge of Ratnapura, he presided over the trial of the murder of Padmasiri Thrimavitharana.

=== Appeal court ===
In 2011, he was appointed a Justice of the Court of Appeal by President Mahinda Rajapaksa and Jeyaraj Fernandopulle served until 2016.

=== Supreme court ===
He was appointed by President Maithripala Sirisena as a Justice of the Supreme Court in March 2016 to replace Justice Sarath de Abrew on his retirement. In October 2018, he was nominated by President Maithripala Sirisena to the Constitutional Council for post of Chief Justice on the retirement of Justice Priyasath Dep. Following the approval of the Constitutional Council, he took oaths as the 46th Chief Justice of Sri Lanka on 12 October. After serving six months in office Perera retired upon reaching the age of 65. A ceremonial farewell was held by the Supreme Court on 5 April. Perera's successor, Attorney General Jayantha Jayasuriya was approved by the Constitutional Council on the 26 April.

== Family ==
He is married to Shirani Perera, who is a lawyer. His sister was Justice Sherin Madawala, former Court of Appeal Judge. He and his sister were the first brother and sister to serve in the Court of Appeal.

Legal offices
Preceded by Priyasath Dep	Chief Justice of Sri Lanka; 2018–2019	Succeeded by Jayantha Jayasuriya
Preceded by Sarath de Abrew	Puisne Justice of the Supreme Court of Sri Lanka; 2016–2018	Succeeded by
Preceded by	Judge of the Court of Appeal of Sri Lanka; 2014–2016	Succeeded by
Preceded by	High Court Judge of Sri Lanka; 2001–2014	Succeeded by
Preceded by	District Court Judge of Sri Lanka; 1990–2001	Succeeded by
