= Eva Wanasundera =

Sri Lankan judge

Eva Wanasundera PC

Puisne Justice of the Supreme Court of Sri Lanka
- In office 7 July 2012 – 14 December 2018

42nd Attorney General of Sri Lanka
- In office 1 September 2011 – 2012
- President: Mahinda Rajapaksa
- Preceded by: Mohan Peiris
- Succeeded by: Palitha Fernando

41st Solicitor General of Sri Lanka
- In office 2011–2011
- President: Mahinda Rajapaksa
- Preceded by: Priyasath Dep
- Succeeded by: Palitha Fernando

Personal details
- Born: Shanthi Eva Jayasena; January 1954 (age 72) Kurunegala, North Western Province
- Spouse: Indrajith
- Children: Subodha
- Education: Sri Lanka Law College; University of Leicester

Shanthi Eva Wanasundera PC (born January 1954) is a Sri Lankan judge and lawyer. She is a former puisne justice of the Supreme Court of Sri Lanka of the Supreme Court of Sri Lanka. Prior to her appointment as puisne justice, in 2012, she served as Solicitor General and Attorney General of Sri Lanka.

Shanthi Eva Wanasundera was born in Kurunegala to Hector Jayasena, a teacher from the south. Wansundera attended St. Thomas' Girls' High School, Matara and Dharmapala Vidyalaya, Pannipitiya where she was appointed the first female head prefect of the school. While at Dharmapala Vidyalaya she won the American Field Service Scholarship which allowed her to study in the United States at Canyon del Oro High School Tucson, Arizona spending a year as an exchange student. Upon her return she entered the Sri Lanka Law College. In 1995 she also obtained a master's degree in law from the University of Leicester.

Wanasundera was called to the bar in 1997. She practiced at the Unofficial Bar for two years prior joining the Attorney General's Department.

She made history when she became the first woman senior state counsel, the first woman deputy solicitor general, the first woman additional solicitor general and the first woman Solicitor General and first ever woman Attorney General of Sri Lanka. Eva Wanasundera served as acting attorney general 16 times before her appointment as attorney general. she represented Sri Lanka at key conferences abroad.

On 7 July 2012 she was appointed as a puisne justice of the Supreme Court of Sri Lanka. Wanasundera, being a senior member of the Supreme Court, has acted as chief justice in the absence of Chief Justice K. Sripavan. She retired two months early from the Supreme Court on 14 December 2018.

Legal offices
Preceded by Mohan Peiris	Attorney General of Sri Lanka; 2011-2012	Succeeded by Palitha Fernando
Preceded by Priyasath Dep	Solicitor General of Sri Lanka; 2011	Succeeded by Palitha Fernando
