= Bandula Karunarathna =

President of the Court of Appeal of Sri Lanka from 2023 to 2025

The Honourable Bandula Karunarathna

51st President of the Court of Appeal of Sri Lanka
- In office 6 February 2023 – 16 June 2025
- Appointed by: Ranil Wickremesinghe
- Preceded by: Priyantha Fernando
- Succeeded by: Rohantha Abeysooriya

Judge of the Court of Appeal of Sri Lanka
- In office 6 March 2019 – 6 February 2023
- Appointed by: Maithripala Sirisena

Personal details
- Born: Nissanka Bandula Karunarathna; 16 June 1962 (age 63)
- Education: Sri Lanka Law College

Nissanka Bandula Karunarathna (born 16 June 1962) is a Sri Lankan lawyer who served as the 51st president of the Court of Appeal of Sri Lanka from 6 February 2023 to 16 June 2025. He was appointed by President Ranil Wickremesinghe.

He had previously served as a judge of the Court of Appeal.

Karunarathna commenced pre-retirement leave on 2 February 2025, with M. T. Mohammed Laffar appointed as acting president. He concluded his tenure on 16 June 2025 upon reaching the mandatory retirement age of 63 and was succeeded as the 52nd president by Rohantha Abeysooriya.

== Career ==
Karunarathna joined the judiciary in November 1988 and served as a judge in Sri Lanka's Primary Court, Magistrate's Court, District Court, High Court and Civil Appellate High Court.

He was appointed as a judge of the Court of Appeal on 6 March 2019 by President Maithripala Sirisena.

On 6 February 2023, Karunarathna was appointed the 51st president of the Court of Appeal by President Ranil Wickremesinghe.

In February 2024, President Wickremesinghe nominated him for elevation as a puisne justice of the Supreme Court of Sri Lanka, but the Constitutional Council rejected the nomination.

The mandatory retirement age for a judge of the Court of Appeal in Sri Lanka is 63. Karunarathna was therefore due to retire on 16 June 2025. However, in January 2025, the newly elected National People's Power government and President Anura Kumara Dissanayake criticised his execution of duties and prepared to move an impeachment motion in the Parliament of Sri Lanka. Karunarathna handed over his resignation to President Dissanayake on 20 January 2025, to be effective from 1 February. He then proceeded on pre-retirement leave until 16 June, the date on which his tenure as president of the Court of Appeal was due to conclude.

M. T. Mohammed Laffar, the next most senior judge of the Court of Appeal, was appointed acting president and served from 2 February until his retirement on 18 June 2025. Karunarathna was succeeded as the 52nd president of the Court of Appeal by Rohantha Abeysooriya on 19 June 2025.

Legal offices
Preceded by Priyantha Fernando	President of the Court of Appeal; 2023–2025	Succeeded by Rohantha Abeysooriya
