= Mahinda Samayawardhena =

Puisne justice of the Supreme Court of Sri Lanka since 2020

The Honourable Mahinda Samayawardhena

Puisne Justice of the Supreme Court of Sri Lanka
- Incumbent
- Assumed office 1 December 2020
- Appointed by: Gotabaya Rajapaksa

Judge of the Court of Appeal of Sri Lanka
- In office 23 April 2018 – 1 December 2020
- Appointed by: Maithripala Sirisena

Personal details
- Born: Mahinda Samayawardhena

Mahinda Samayawardhena is a Sri Lankan lawyer serving since 1 December 2020 as a puisne justice of the Supreme Court of Sri Lanka. He was appointed by President Gotabaya Rajapaksa.

== Career ==
Samayawardhena joined the judiciary in 1988 and served as a judge in Sri Lanka's Primary Court, Magistrate's Court, District Court and High Court. As a judge of the High Court, he served across all three branches: criminal, commercial and civil appellate.

He was appointed as a judge of the Court of Appeal of Sri Lanka by President Maithripala Sirisena on 23 April 2018 and served till 1 December 2020.

On 1 December 2020, he was appointed to the Supreme Court of Sri Lanka by President Gotabaya Rajapaksa as a puisne justice.

=== Commission assignments ===
In July 2025, Samayawardhena was appointed by President Anura Kumara Dissanayake as a member of the Judicial Service Commission (JSC), filling the vacancy created by the retirement of former puisne justice Gamini Amarasekera.

He is also the current director of the Sri Lanka Judges' Institute.
