= Hermann Albert Loos =

Unofficial Member of the Legislative Council of Ceylon
- In office 1921–1931

Acting Puisne Justices of the Supreme Court of Ceylon
- In office 1919–1920

Personal details
- Born: 21 July 1865 Colombo, British Ceylon
- Died: 27 March 1929 (aged 63) Colombo, British Ceylon
- Spouse: Minnie Evelyn Gratiaen
- Relations: Frederick Charles Loos (father), Jane Harriet née Keith (mother)
- Children: 7
- Education: University College London, University of Cambridge

Hermann Albert Loos (21 July 1865 - 27 March 1929) was a Ceylonese lawyer, judge and legislator. He was an unofficial member of the Legislative Council of Ceylon.

Hermann Albert Loos was born on 21 July 1865 in Colombo the second son (fourth child of seven) of Frederick Charles Loos (1834-1911), member of the Legislative Council and Jane Harriet née Keith (1838-1872), he was educated privately before studying at the City of London School, University College, London and Gonville and Caius College, Cambridge graduating in 1887 and was called to the bar as a barrister at the Inner Temple. On his return to Ceylon he was admitted as an advocate of the Supreme Court and became private secretary to Justice Lovell Burchett Clarence. He started his own practice in the unofficial bar in 1890, and joined the Attorney General's Department as Acting Office Assistant and Additional Crown Counsel. In 1899 he was appointed Additional Crown Counsel and in 1903 he was appointed Office Assistant and Crown Counsel. He served as District Judge of Colombo. He married Minnie Evelyn Gratiaen in Kandy on 9 February 1891 and they had seven children.

He was elected as an unofficial member in the 1921 legislative council election and was nominated in 1924 as an unofficial member by the Governor to the Legislative Council of Ceylon.

The Hermann Loos Championship Trophy has been awarded annually since 1917 to the best performing cadet platoon of the National Cadet Corps at its annual camp at Rantembe.
