= Buwaneka Aluwihare =

Sri Lankan puisne justice of the Supreme Court (2013–2024)

The Honourable Buwaneka Aluwihare PC

Puisne Justice of the Supreme Court of Sri Lanka
- In office 4 December 2013 – January 2024
- Appointed by: Mahinda Rajapaksa

Personal details
- Born: Buwaneka Aluwihare
- Education: University of London; St. Sylvester's College

Buwaneka Aluwihare PC is a Sri Lankan lawyer and a former puisne justice of the Supreme Court. He was appointed to the Court on 4 December 2013 by President Mahinda Rajapaksa and retired in January 2024.

== Career ==
Prior to his appointment to the Supreme Court, he served as a Deputy Solicitor General at the Attorney General's Department.

Aluwihare also worked as a prosecutor for the United Nations Serious Crimes Investigation Unit and for the United Nations East Timor war crimes tribunal. In 2015, he was additionally appointed as a Justice of Appeal to the Supreme Court of Fiji.
