= Judicial Service Commission (Sri Lanka) =

Independent judicial regulatory body in Sri Lanka

The Judicial Service Commission (JSC) of Sri Lanka was established on 4 October 1947 under the provisions of Article 111D of the Constitution of Sri Lanka. Its primary objective is to safeguard judicial independence by functioning as an independent regulatory body.

== Role ==
The functions of the Judicial Service Commission, as vested in it by the Constitution and other statutes, are as follows:

1. Appointment, promotion, transfer and disciplinary control of judges of the Courts of First Instance, including district judges, magistrates and presidents of Labour Tribunals.
2. Appointment, training and disciplinary control of Quazis, who exercise Family Court jurisdiction within the Muslim community.
3. Appointment of the chairman and members of the Administrative Appeals Tribunal, the appellate body for decisions of the Public Service Commission and the Police Commission.
4. Appointment of the chairman and members of the Elders’ Maintenance Board, which adjudicates maintenance applications submitted by parents neglected by their children.
5. Appointment, promotion, transfer and disciplinary control of officers in the Scheduled Public Service who serve as court staff.
6. Supervision and administration of the entire judicial system.

== Membership ==
The Judicial Service Commission comprises three members appointed by the President of Sri Lanka. Its membership includes the Chief Justice of Sri Lanka and the two most senior puisne justices of the Supreme Court. If the chief justice and the two most senior puisne justices lack experience as a magistrate or district judge, the next most senior puisne justice with such experience will be appointed to the Commission to fill one seat. The chief justice serves as the commissioner of the JSC. The quorum for any meeting of the commission is two members. Each member serves a renewable three-year term from the date of appointment, unless retired, resigned, or removed from office.

The current membership is as follows:

As of 25 May 2026

Name	Appointed by	Date appointed	Description	Ref.
Padman Surasena	Dissanayake	January 2025	Chairman/Chief Justice	
Mahinda Samayawardhena	Dissanayake	July 2025	Member/Puisne justice	
Yasantha Kodagoda	Dissanayake	May 2026	Member/Puisne justice	
