= Sathya Hettige =

Sri Lankan judge

Sathya Hettige PC

Puisne Justice of the Supreme Court of Sri Lanka
- In office 10 July 2011 – 18 April 2014

Personal details
- Education: University of Colombo

Sathya Hettige PC is a Sri Lankan judge and lawyer. He is a former judge of the Supreme Court of Sri Lanka and is also a non-resident justice of appeal of the Supreme Court of Fiji. Prior to his appointment as Puisne Justice of the Supreme Court of Sri Lanka he was serving as president of Court of appeal.

Hettige secured his Bachelor of Laws from the University of Colombo. He qualified as an attorney-at-law in 1976 joining the Attorney General's department in 1978. Hettige served as principal law officer in the director of Public Prosecutions, Fiji Islands and was enrolled as a barrister and solicitor in the Supreme Court of Fiji on 19 March 1993.

He is related to the Rajapaksa family.
