= Frederick Charles Moncrieff =

Puisne Judge of the Supreme Court of Mauritius
- In office ?–1900

Puisne Justice of the Supreme Court of Ceylon
- In office 4 April 1900 – 1905
- Appointed by: Joseph West Ridgeway
- Preceded by: George Henry Withers

Frederick Charles Moncrieff was a British colonial judge.

He was Puisne judge of the Supreme Court of Mauritius until March 1900, when he was appointed Puisne Justice of the Supreme Court of Ceylon, serving as such until 1905.

Legal offices
Preceded by George Henry Withers	Puisne Justice of the Supreme Court of Ceylon; 1900-1905	Succeeded by
