= Priyasath Dep =

Chief Justice of Sri Lanka from 2017 to 2018

Priyasath Dep PC
- ප්‍රියසාත් ඩෙප්

45th Chief Justice of Sri Lanka
- In office 2 March 2017 – 12 October 2018
- Appointed by: Maithripala Sirisena
- Preceded by: K. Sripavan
- Succeeded by: Nalin Perera

Puisne Justice of the Supreme Court of Sri Lanka
- In office 10 July 2011 – 2 March 2017
- Appointed by: Mahinda Rajapaksa

40th Solicitor General of Sri Lanka
- In office 2007–2011
- Appointed by: Chandrika Kumaratunga
- Preceded by: C. R. De Silva
- Succeeded by: Eva Wansundera

Personal details
- Born: October 12, 1953 (age 72)
- Education: University of Colombo; International Institute of Social Studies

Priyasath Dep PC (Sinhala: ප්‍රියසාත් ඩෙප් ; born October 12, 1953) is a Sri Lankan judge and lawyer. He was the 45th Chief Justice of Sri Lanka and a former Solicitor General of Sri Lanka.

== Early life and education ==
Dep's father was Arthur C. Dep a police officer, who retired as a Deputy Inspector General of Police. Educated at St. Joseph's College, Colombo, where he excelled in studies, athletics, rugby, and soccer. Dep obtained a Bachelor of Arts in Development Studies at the University of Colombo. He represented the university in rugby and cricket.

== Legal career ==
Studying law at the Sri Lanka Law College, he was called to bar in October 1976 and began his legal practice. In January 1978, he joined the Attorney General's Department as a State Counsel. In February 1989 he was promoted to Senior State Counsel and in February 1996 he was promoted to Deputy Solicitor General and Additional Solicitor General in October 1999. He was appointed a President's Counsel in April 2000. In 2007, he was appointed Solicitor General and served in this post till 2011. During his tenure in the Attorney General’s Department, Dep won a scholarship by the Dutch Government that enabled him to acquire a post-graduate diploma in international law at the International Institute of Social Studies in The Hague. As a prosecutor he was involved in the Amarapala (Deputy Director of Customs) Murder case, Inoka Sevwandi Murder and the Sujith Prasanna Perera (Superintendent of Customs) Murder. He had served as the head of the Criminal Division of the Attorney General’s Department.

== Judaical career ==
In 2011, he left the Attorney General’s Department, when he was appointed to a Puisne Justice of the Supreme Court of Sri Lanka. On February 27, 2017 he was nominated by the Constitutional Council as the 45th Chief Justice of Sri Lanka and was sworn in in March.

Legal offices
Preceded by Kanagasabapathy Sripavan	Chief Justice of Sri Lanka; 2017–2018	Succeeded by Nalin Perera
Preceded by C. R. De Silva	Solicitor General of Sri Lanka; 2007–2011	Succeeded by Eva Wansundera
