= Chandra Ekanayake =

Sri Lankan judge and lawyer

Puisne Justice of the Supreme Court of Sri Lanka
- In office November 2008 – March 2016

Personal details
- Spouse: Tissa
- Children: Charuka; Narmadha; Thavindra
- Education: Sri Lanka Law College

Chandra Ekanayake is a Sri Lankan judge and lawyer. She was a sitting judge of the Supreme Court of Sri Lanka and since 2012 is also a non-resident Justice of Appeal of the Supreme Court of Fiji.

Ekanayake was educated at Sanghamitta Balika Vidyalaya, Galle and Visakha Vidyalaya, Colombo, thereafter she entering the Sri Lanka Law College.

Ekanayake was admitted to the bar in 1974 and severed from 1979 to 1980 a judge of the Primary Court.

Her husband Tissa Ekanayake is also a senior High Court Judge.
