= Wijeratne =

Wijeratne (Sinhala: විජේරත්න, romanized: Vijēratna) is both a given name and a surname. Notable people with the name include:

== Given name ==
- Wijeratne Warakagoda, Sri Lankan actor

== Surname ==
- Dinuk Wijeratne, Sri Lankan-born Canadian conductor, composer and pianist
- Larry Wijeratne (1950–1998), Sri Lankan general
- Ranjan Wijeratne (1931–1991), Sri Lankan politician
- Sahan Wijeratne (born 1984), Sri Lankan cricketer
- Sampath Wijeratne, Sri Lankan puisne justice of the Supreme Court
- Srimantha Wijeratne (born 1989), Canadian cricketer
- Vishva Wijeratne (born 1992), Sri Lankan cricketer
