= Frederick Charles Loos =

Ceylonese lawyer and politician

Hon. Frederick Charles Loos CMG
- Born: 13 December 1834; Colombo, Sri Lanka
- Died: 21 August 1911 (aged 76); Colombo, Sri Lanka
- Occupations: lawyer, politician
- Spouses: Jane Harriet née Keith (m. 1859) Isabel Amelia née Van Cuylenberg (m. 1874)
- Children: Margaret; Frederick Christian; Marianne; Herman Albert; William Christopher; Charles Garvin; Julian Henry Keith; Albert Edward; Hector Rienzi; Mira; Lilian Stephanie Alberta; Beatrice Hesba; George Cecil Bertram; Walter Frederick Michael

Frederick Charles Loos (13 December 1834 – 21 August 1911) CMG was a Ceylonese lawyer and politician.

Frederick Charles Loos was born on 13 December 1834, the son of Christiaan Albertus Loos (Registrar of the Supreme Court of Ceylon) and Cornelia Rudolphina née Cramer, the second of nine children.

In 1857 he graduated from the Ceylon Law College as a Proctor, starting up his own legal practice.

On 25 April 1859 he married Jane Harriet née Keith (1838 – 1872) at the Holy Trinity Church, St Sebastian, Colombo, with whom he had seven children. On 2 November 1974 he married Isabel Amelia née Van Cuylenberg (1836 – 1935), with whom he had a further seven children.

From 1865 to 1872 Loos served as a Councillor, representing the Maradana Seat, on the Colombo Municipal Council. After retiring from local politics he concentrated on his professional work and his legal practice. Loos purchased considerable property both in Colombo and Nuwara Eliya, including the Galle Face Hotel, converting the hotel business into a company, in which he was one of the largest share-holders. He also owned a number of tea estates.

In June 1900 Loos was appointed as an unofficial member of Legislative Council of Ceylon representing the Burgher community, replacing the previous member Henry Lorensz Wendt. On the completion of his first term of five years he was re-nominated for a second term and remained on the Council until his death in 1911.

In 1908 Loos was elected as the inaugural president of the Dutch Burgher Union of Ceylon, a position which he served until he died.

In 1909 he was awarded with a Companion of the Order of St Michael and St George (CMG), in recognition of his services on the Legislative Council.

Loos died on 21 August 1911 at the age of 76. His widow, Isabel Amelia, after Loos death, joined the Gospell Hall Brethren, purchasing land, building and furnishing the congregation with its own gospel hall, Bethesda Gospel Hall, in Colombo (which was dedicated on 3 April 1919). His two eldest sons, Frederick Charles (1861-1957) and Herman Albert (1865-?) also studied law and became barristers. His second youngest son, George Cecil Bertram, (1884-1915) was the first Ceylonese to be killed in action during World War I, while serving as a Lieutenant in the 3rd Battalion, Worcestershire Regiment on 12 March 1915 and was buried in the Kemmel Chateau Military Cemetery in Belgium.
