= List of justices of the Supreme Court of Sri Lanka by court composition =

List of justices of the Supreme Court of Sri Lanka by court composition.

== See also ==
- List of chief justices of Sri Lanka
- List of justices of the Supreme Court of Sri Lanka
