= List of chancellors of Durham =

This is a list of those who have served as Chancellor of County Durham:

- 1655–?: Thomas Widdrington
- 1787–1788: John Scott
- 1788–1791: Sir John Mitford
- 1791–1798: Sir Thomas Manners-Sutton
- 1798–1818: Samuel Romilly
- 1818–1835: Robert Hopper Williamson
- 1835–1846: Sir Charles Wetherell
- 1847–1851: Richard Torin Kindersley
- 1851–1871: Christopher Temple
- 1871–1887: James Fleming
- 1887–1892: Gainsford Bruce
- 1892–1905: Thomas Milvain
- 1905–1915: John Scott Fox
- 1915–1930: Edward Tindal Atkinson
- 1930–1936: Sir Henry Arthur Colefax
- 1936–1950: Charles Paley Scott
- 1950–1958: John Charlesworth
- 1958–1959: James Neville Gray
- 1959–1960: Arthur Geoffrey Neale Cross
- 1960–1969: Henry Edwin Salt
- 1969–1971: Hugh Elvet Francis
