= Tellipalai Rajaratnam =

Sri Lankan judge (1920–1994)

T. W. Rajaratnam

Puisne Justice of the Supreme Court of Sri Lanka
- In office 1972–1978

Member of Parliament for National List
- In office 1989–1994

Personal details
- Born: 21 December 1920
- Died: 15 January 1994 (aged 73)
- Party: Sri Lanka Freedom Party
- Education: Trinity College, Kandy
- Profession: Lawyer
- Ethnicity: Sri Lankan Tamil

Tellipalai Wanarajah Rajaratnam (21 December 1920 – 15 January 1994) was a Sri Lankan lawyer, judge and politician. He was a Commissioner of Assize, Supreme Court judge and Member of Parliament.

== Early life ==
Rajaratnam was born on 21 December 1920. He was the son of T. C. Rajaratnam, CBE a proctor for Jaffna. He was educated at Trinity College, Kandy. After school he entered university and graduated with an honours degree in western classics and law.

== Career ==
Rajaratnam admitted to the bar in 1948. He was admitted to Lincoln's Inn in 1951. He practised law in the UK before returning to Ceylon where he continued to practice law. He worked on the Sathasivam and Bibile MP murder cases. He then joined the judicial service, becoming a Commissioner of Assize in 1970. He was appointed a Supreme Court judge in 1972, a position he held for six years.

== Later life ==
In retirement Rajaratnam wrote two books: A Manual of Industrial Law and Plantation Workers' Manual. He is also published The Bhutto Trial for which he received the Hilal-e-Quaid-i-Azam honour from Pakistan. In 1989 he was appointed to Parliament as a National List MP for the Sri Lanka Freedom Party, serving from 1989 to 1994.

Rajaratnam died on 15 January 1994 at the age of 73.
