= Kumudini Wickremasinghe =

Puisne justice of the Supreme Court of Sri Lanka (2020–2026)

The Honourable Kumudini Wickremasinghe

Puisne Justice of the Supreme Court of Sri Lanka
- In office 1 December 2020 – April 2026
- Appointed by: Gotabaya Rajapaksa

Judge of the Court of Appeal of Sri Lanka
- In office 11 February 2015 – 1 December 2020
- Appointed by: Maithripala Sirisena

Personal details
- Born: Kumudini Wickremasinghe

Kumudini Wickremasinghe is a Sri Lankan lawyer who served as a puisne justice of the Supreme Court of Sri Lanka from 1 December 2020 till April 2026.

== Career ==
Wickremasinghe previously served as a judge of the Court of Appeal of Sri Lanka from 11 February 2015 to 1 December 2020, having been appointed by President Maithripala Sirisena.

Wickremasinghe was appointed as a puisne justice of the Supreme Court by President Gotabaya Rajapaksa on 1 December 2020. She retired from service in April 2026.

== Notes ==
- "Hon. Justice Kumudini Wickremasinghe". Supreme Court of Sri Lanka. 18 November 2026. Archived from the original on 19 April 2026.
