= Sobhitha Rajakaruna =

Sri Lankan puisne justice of the Supreme Court since 2025

The Honourable Sobhitha Rajakaruna

Puisne Justice of the Supreme Court of Sri Lanka
- Incumbent
- Assumed office 12 January 2025
- Appointed by: Anura Kumara Dissanayake

Judge of the Court of Appeal of Sri Lanka
- In office 26 February 2020 – 11 January 2025
- Appointed by: Gotabaya Rajapaksa

Personal details
- Born: R. M. Sobhitha Rajakaruna
- Education: National University of Singapore; University of Colombo; Sri Lanka Law College; Nalanda College, Colombo

R. M. Sobhitha Rajakaruna is a Sri Lankan lawyer serving since 12 January 2025 as a puisne justice of the Supreme Court of Sri Lanka. He was appointed by President Anura Kumara Dissanayake.

== Early life ==
Rajakaruna is an alumnus of Nalanda College, Colombo, where he served as Head Prefect in 1985/86. He graduated from the Sri Lanka Law College, University of Colombo and the National University of Singapore.

== Career ==
Rajakaruna previously served as a judge of the Court of Appeal of Sri Lanka from 26 February 2020 to 11 January 2025, having been appointed by President Gotabaya Rajapaksa. Before his judicial appointment, he was a Senior Deputy Solicitor General with the Attorney General's Department.

== Works ==
- Rajakaruna, Sobhitha (2010). Changing Party Allegiance and Termination of Parliamentary Mandate: Analysis of Checks and Balances in Expulsion of MPs in Sri Lanka. Stamford Lake Publication. ISBN 978-955-658-235-2.

== Notes ==
- "Hon. Justice Sobhitha Rajakaruna". Supreme Court of Sri Lanka. 18 November 2025. Archived from the original on 19 April 2026.
