= Murdu Fernando =

Chief Justice of Sri Lanka from 2024 to 2025

The Honourable Murdu Fernando PC

48th Chief Justice of Sri Lanka
- In office 2 December 2024 – 27 July 2025
- Appointed by: Anura Kumara Dissanayake
- Preceded by: Jayantha Jayasuriya
- Succeeded by: Padman Surasena

Acting Chief Justice
- In office 10 October 2024 – 2 December 2024
- Appointed by: Anura Kumara Dissanayake

Puisne Justice of the Supreme Court of Sri Lanka
- In office 9 March 2018 – 2 December 2024
- Appointed by: Maithripala Sirisena

Personal details
- Born: Murdu Nirupa Bidushinie Fernando; 27 July 1960 (age 66) Moratuwa
- Spouse: Sasanka Fernando
- Education: King's College London (LL.M); University of Colombo (LLB); Sri Lanka Law College; Princess of Wales College

Murdu Nirupa Bidushinie Fernando, PC (born 27 July 1960) is a Sri Lankan lawyer who served as the 48th Chief Justice of Sri Lanka from 2 December 2024 to 27 July 2025. She was appointed by President Anura Kumara Dissanayake. She was the second woman to hold the position of chief justice, following Shirani Bandaranayake.

Previously, she served as the acting chief justice from 10 October to 1 December 2024.

Fernando retired on 27 July 2025 and was succeeded as the 49th chief justice by Padman Surasena.

== Early life ==
Fernando was educated at Princess of Wales' College, where she served as head prefect and house captain. She received awards for best debater and the junior prize for the most outstanding student. She went on to study law at the University of Colombo, graduating with a Bachelor of Laws. She then completed her law examinations at the Sri Lanka Law College, where she ranked first in the order of merit and was awarded the Sir Lalitha Rajapakse Memorial Prize and the A. B. Cooray Memorial Prize. She later obtained a Master of Laws from King’s College, London.

== Career ==
Fernando joined the Attorney General's Department as a State Counsel, where she served for over 30 years. During her tenure, she was promoted to Senior State Counsel, Deputy Solicitor General, Additional Solicitor General and Senior Additional Solicitor General. She was appointed a President's Counsel while serving as an Additional Solicitor General.

She was appointed as a puisne justice of the Supreme Court of Sri Lanka on 9 March 2018 by President Maithripala Sirisena.

On 10 October 2024, President Dissanayake appointed Fernando as the acting chief justice following the retirement of Jayantha Jayasuriya, who served as the 47th chief justice. Her nomination for appointment as the next chief justice, submitted by President Dissanayake, was approved by the Constitutional Council on 16 November 2024. She was officially sworn in on 2 December 2024.

Fernando retired on 27 July 2025 and was succeeded as the 49th chief justice by Padman Surasena. In Sri Lanka, the mandatory retirement age for a puisne justice of the Supreme Court or the chief justice is 65 years.

Legal offices
Preceded by Jayantha Jayasuriya	Chief Justice of Sri Lanka; 2024–2025	Succeeded by Padman Surasena
