= George Withers =

George Withers may refer to:

- George Withers (politician), Australian politician
- George Withers (footballer), Australian rules footballer
- George Withers (archdeacon), English clergyman
- George Henry Withers, British judge in Ceylon

== See also ==
- George Wither, English poet, pamphleteer, satirist and writer of hymns
