= Rohini Marasinghe =

Sri Lankan judge

Puisne Justice of the Supreme Court of Sri Lanka
- In office 26 April 2013 – 2015
- Appointed by: Mahinda Rajapaksa

Judge of the Court of Appeal of Sri Lanka
- In office 2006–2013

Personal details
- Spouse: Lakshman Marasinghe
- Children: Sureni Jayasekara, Tarini Thomas, Irantha Perera, Leelan Marasinghe
- Education: University of Hartford

Rohini Perera Marasinghe is a Sri Lankan judge and lawyer. She was a sitting judge on the Supreme Court of Sri Lanka. Prior to her appointment as Puisne Justice of the Supreme Court of Sri Lanka, in April 2013, she served as a judge of the Court of Appeal and was promoted to fill the vacancy created by the retirement of Justice S. I. Imam.

Rohini Marasinghe, graduating in law in 1976, joined the Attorney-General's Department as a State Counsel in 1980. Becoming a Magistrate in 1983, Marasinghe served as a District judge in almost all parts of the country before being appointed High Court judge. In 2006, she was elevated as a Judge of the Court of Appeal. In April 2013 Marasinghe was appointed to the Supreme Court of Sri Lanka. At the appointment of Marasinghe the Peiris court had four female judges.

Marasinghe obtained her master's from the University of Hartford.

Other posts

Marasinghe has participated in and presented legal papers at numerous conferences and seminars all over the world, including at the Commonwealth Magistrates and Judges Conference and the South Asian Association for Regional Cooperation Conference.

- Resource person at the Sri Lankan Judges Institute
- Secretary to the Judicial Service Association
- Secretary to the High Court Judges Association
- President to the High Court Judges Association
