= Eugene Reginald de Fonseka =

Sri Lankan judge

Eugene Reginald de Fonseka QC
- Born: 11 March 1912; Colombo, Sri Lanka
- Died: 27 September 2003 (aged 91); Colombo, Sri Lanka
- Education: Royal College, University College Colombo, Ceylon Law College
- Occupation: Judge
- Spouse: Lillian Grace née Gooneratne
- Children: Geetha, Piyal
- Relatives: Tissa Abeysekara (nephew), Susantha de Fonseka (cousin)

Eugene Reginald de Fonseka, QC (11 March 1912 - 21 September 2003) was a puisne judge of the Supreme Court of Sri Lanka and served as the acting Chief Justice of Sri Lanka of the Supreme Court of Sri Lanka in 1960 and 1962.

== Education ==
He obtained his primary and secondary school education at the Royal College Colombo and gained a BSc special in mathematics from the University of London having studied at the University College Colombo.

== Legal career ==
Having studied law at the Ceylon Law College, he was admitted to the bar in July 1945. Having started his practice in the unofficial bar, he joined the Attorney General's Department as a Temporary Additional Crown Counsel in 1947 and was promoted Crown Counsel in 1950. He rose to the position of Deputy Solicitor-General and was appointed as the Commissioner of Assize by the Supreme Court of Ceylon and later a puisne judge of the same Court, where on two occasions he served as the acting Chief justice of Ceylon.

After he retired he was appointed as the Chairman of the Land Acquisition Board of Review, a member of the Compensation Board under the Land Reform Commission, the Agrarian Services Board of Review, a member of the Income Tax Board of Review and the Chairman of the Debt Conciliation Board.

He died on 27 September 2003, at his private residence "Witanhurst" situated within the gardens of his ancestral home, "Greenlands" in Colombo. De Fonseka was a first cousin of Sir Susantha de Fonseka and the paternal uncle of Tissa Abeysekara. He was married Lilian Grace née Gooneratne, had two children Geetha and Piyal.
