= Yasantha Kodagoda =

Puisne justice of the Supreme Court of Sri Lanka since 2020

Puisne Justice of the Supreme Court of Sri Lanka
- Incumbent
- Assumed office 3 February 2020
- Appointed by: Gotabaya Rajapaksa

Additional Solicitors General
- Incumbent
- Assumed office 15 Feb 2015
- Nominated by: The Attorney General's Department, Sri Lanka

Personal details
- Relations: Prof. Nandadasa Kodagoda (father)
- Education: University of London; Sri Lanka Law College; Ananda College

Yasantha Kodagoda (born 1965) is a Sri Lankan lawyer serving since 3 February 2020 as a puisne justice of the Supreme Court of Sri Lanka. He was appointed by President Gotabaya Rajapaksa.

== Career ==
He was called to the Bar as an Attorney-at-Law of the Supreme Court of Sri Lanka on 28 October 1988. Prior to being appointed by the President of Sri Lanka as the President of the Court of Appeal in March 2019 (following a unanimous approval of his nomination by the Constitutional Council), he served as an Additional Solicitor General of the Attorney General's Department. Having joined the Attorney General's Department of Sri Lanka in 1989 as a State Counsel, he rose to the positions of Senior State Counsel (1999), Deputy Solicitor General (2005), Senior Deputy Solicitor General (2014) and Additional Solicitor General (2015). He has 30+ years of experience as a Public Prosecutor and Legal Advisor to the Government of Sri Lanka. His specialization is in the field of criminal justice. In 2015, in recognition of his eminence in the legal profession, he was appointed President's Counsel. He completed his primary and secondary education at Ananda College Colombo he was a president Scout of ananda college and then attended Sri Lanka Law College. He obtained Master's degree in Public International Law with Merit (LL.M.) from the University College London (UCL) He acted as the Director of the Advanced Legal Studies Unit of the Sri Lanka Law College and the Director of the Institute of Advanced Legal Studies (Sri Lanka) of the Incorporated Council of Legal Education. He has served many Commissions of Inquiry as representative Counsel of the Attorney General. For over a decade, he has represented Sri Lanka before the UN Human Rights Commission and the UN Human Rights Council. He has also represented Sri Lanka before the UN Security Council's Working Group on Children in Armed Conflict, and has served as the Accredited Representative of the Government of Sri Lanka at the UN Committee Against Torture. He was a member of the EU-Sri Lanka Working Group on Trade and Economic Relations Cooperation 2016 and actively participated in Sri Lanka gaining the GSP+ trade concessions. Kodagoda is known as a book reviewer

In May 2026, Kodagoda was appointed to the Judicial Service Commission as a member.

== See also ==
- Attorney General's Department
