= William Edward Barber =

Ceylonese lawyer and judge (1876–1939)

Puisne Justice of the Supreme Court of Ceylon
- In office 1932–1932

Personal details
- Born: 9 August 1876 Colombo,
- Died: 25 January 1939 (aged 62) Kandy
- Education: Kingswood College, Kandy
- Profession: Barrister

William Edward Barber (9 August 1876 – 25 January 1939) was a Ceylonese lawyer who was a judge of the Supreme Court of Ceylon.

== Early life and education ==
Born in Colombo, Ceylon on 9 August 1876, he was the son of James Henry Barber. He was educated at Kingswood College, Kandy.

== Career ==
Barber was called to the English bar of Gray's Inn in 1896. In 1911, he joined the Attorney General's department of the Supreme Court of Ceylon as crown counsel. In 1925, he was appointed District Judge of Colombo and Kandy. In 1932, he was appointed a puisne judge of the Supreme Court of Ceylon and Commissioner of Assize. He retired as a judge shortly after due to ill health, but later continued to practise as a barrister until his death.

== Personal life and death ==
Barber married Agnes Stella Jonklaas in 1907. He died on 25 January 1939 in Kandy.
