= Arjuna Obeyesekere =

Puisne justice of the Supreme Court of Sri Lanka since 2021

The Honourable Arjuna Obeyesekere

Puisne Justice of the Supreme Court of Sri Lanka
- Incumbent
- Assumed office 14 June 2021
- Appointed by: Gotabaya Rajapaksa

President of the Court of Appeal of Sri Lanka
- In office 1 December 2020 – 14 June 2021
- Appointed by: Gotabaya Rajapaksa

Judge of the Court of Appeal of Sri Lanka
- In office 23 April 2018 – 14 June 2021
- Appointed by: Maithripala Sirisena

Personal details
- Born: Arjuna Obeyesekere
- Education: University of Cambridge (LL.M); Sri Lanka Law College; S. Thomas' College, Mount Lavinia; S. Thomas' Preparatory School

Arjuna Obeyesekere is a Sri Lankan lawyer serving since 14 June 2021 as a puisne justice of the Supreme Court of Sri Lanka. He was appointed by President Gotabaya Rajapaksa.

== Early life ==
Obeyesekere is an alumnus of S. Thomas' College, Mount Lavinia and S. Thomas' Preparatory School. He graduated from Sri Lanka Law College and the University of Cambridge, where he obtained a Master's degree in law (LL.M) specialising in Commercial Law.

== Career ==
Obeyesekere was appointed as a judge of the Court of Appeal of Sri Lanka on 23 April 2018 by President Maithripala Sirisena. He was later appointed President of the Court of Appeal on 1 December 2020 by President Gotabaya Rajapaksa.

Before his judicial appointment, he was a Deputy Solicitor General with the Attorney General's Department.
