= District Judge =

District Judge may refer to:

- A United States federal judge, appointed by the president and confirmed by the Senate
- A judge in a state court (United States), where the state is divided into judicial districts
- Judiciary of England and Wales § District judges
- A judge in the district courts of India
- A judge of the Hong Kong District Court
- The short name for a judge of the District Court (Ireland) in the Republic of Ireland
- The short name for a judge of the district courts of Sri Lanka in Sri Lanka
- In the judiciary of Northern Ireland:
  - District judge, judge that sits to hear pre-trial applications and small claims cases in the county court, previously known as a circuit registrar
  - District judge, judge that presides over the magistrates' courts, formerly known as a resident magistrate
