= Amarasekara =

Amarasekara or Amarasekera (Sinhala: අමරසේකර, romanized: Amarasēkara) is a Sinhalese surname. Notable people with the surname include:

== Amarasekara ==
- A. C. G. S. Amarasekara (1883–1983), Sri Lankan painter
- Gunadasa Amarasekara, Sri Lankan writer, poet and essayist
- Prasanna Amarasekara (born 1981), Sri Lankan athlete
- Sirisena Amarasekara, Sri Lankan public servant and diplomat

== Amarasekera ==
- Gamini Amarasekera, Sri Lankan puisne justice of the Supreme Court since 2019
