= Achala Wengappuli =

Puisne justice of the Supreme Court of Sri Lanka since 2020

Puisne Justice of the Supreme Court of Sri Lanka
- Incumbent
- Assumed office 1 December 2020

Judge of the Court of Appeal of Sri Lanka
- In office 22 February 2018 – 30 November 2020

Personal details
- Education: University of Ceylon, Royal College, Colombo

Arachchige Achala Uthpalavarna Wengappuli is a Sri Lankan lawyer serving since 1 December 2020 as a puisne justice of the Supreme Court of Sri Lanka. He was appointed by President Gotabaya Rajapaksa.

He was a Judge of the Court of Appeal of Sri Lanka from 2018 to 2020 and a judge of the High Court of Sri Lanka from 2007 to 2018.

== Early life ==
Wengappuli received his primary education at Lalith Athulathmudali Vidyalaya, Mt Lavinia and completed his secondary education at Royal College, Colombo. Thereafter he entered Sri Lanka Law College and was admitted to the bar in 1990. He later gained an LL.M from the University of Colombo.

== Career ==
He joined the Attorney General's Department as a State Counsel in 1993. He left the Attorney General's Department in 2007, when he was appointed a Judge of the High Court and was seconded to the judiciary of Fiji. In March 2018, he was appointed as a justice of the Court of Appeal of Sri Lanka and in December 2020, he was appointed as a justice of the Supreme Court of Sri Lanka.
