= K. T. Chitrasiri =

Sri Lankan judge

Kankanithanthri Chitrasiri

Puisne Justice of the Supreme Court of Sri Lanka
- Incumbent
- Assumed office 3 December 2015
- Appointed by: Maithripala Sirisena
- Preceded by: Rohini Marasinghe

Judge of the Court of Appeal of Sri Lanka
- In office 2009 – 3 December 2015

High Court Judge of Sri Lanka
- In office 2002–2009

Personal details
- Education: Queen Mary College, University of London; University of Sri Lanka

Kankanithanthri T. Chitrasiri is a puisne justice of the Supreme Court of Sri Lanka who was appointed by President Maithripala Sirisena in 2016 to replace Justice Rohini Marasinghe. He was justice of the Court of Appeal of Sri Lanka, judge of the High Court and a magistrate.

He received an education from Dharmasoka College, Ambalangoda and at Royal College, Colombo, he entered the University of Sri Lanka. He would later follow post graduate studies at Queen Mary College, University of London.

Having called to the bar in 1977, he started his practice at the Balapitiya Bar having apprenticed under P. Navaratnarajah Q. He then joined the Legal Draftsman's Department as an assistant legal draftsman in 1979 and was appointed a judicial officer the year later. He served in the courts of Kandy, Galle, and Panadura. He served as the chief magistrate of Colombo and district judge in Colombo. In 2002 he was appointed judge of the Commercial High Court and held the post until 2009. In 2009, he was appointed as a judge of the Court of Appeal. He had also served as director of the Human Rights Commission and the registrar of companies. In an unprecedented move he was appointed to concurrently serve as Commissioner-General of Inland Revenue in 2009.

On 19 November 2015 Chitrasiri was recommended to the Constitutional Council by President Maithripala Sirisena to be appointed as a judge of the Supreme Court of Sri Lanka. On 3 December 2015 Chitrasiri was sworn in as a justice of the Supreme Court, at the President's office in the parliament complex.

Legal offices
Preceded by Rohini Marasinghe	Puisne Justice of the Supreme Court of Sri Lanka; 2015–present	Incumbent
Preceded by	Judge of the Court of Appeal of Sri Lanka; 2009–2015	Succeeded by
Preceded by	High Court Judge of Sri Lanka; 2002–2009	Succeeded by
