= H. A. G. de Silva =

Sri Lankan judge (1925-?)

147th Puisne Justice of the Supreme Court of Ceylon
- In office 10 February 1986 – ?

Justice of the Court of Appeal of Sri Lanka
- In office 6 May 1981 – 1986

Personal details
- Born: 15 October 1925
- Relations: Hethumuni Ayadoris de Silva (father)
- Education: University of London

Hethumuni Ananda Gunasena de Silva (born 15 October 1925, date of death unknown) was a Puisne Justice of the Supreme Court of Ceylon. He was the son of Puisne Justice Hethumuni Ayadoris de Silva, CMG. His wife, Airanganee de Silva, died in October 2002. De Silva is deceased.

Legal offices
Preceded by	Puisne Justice of the Supreme Court of Ceylon; 1986-?	Succeeded by
