= Joseph Richard Grenier =

Barrister and colonial judge (1852-1926)

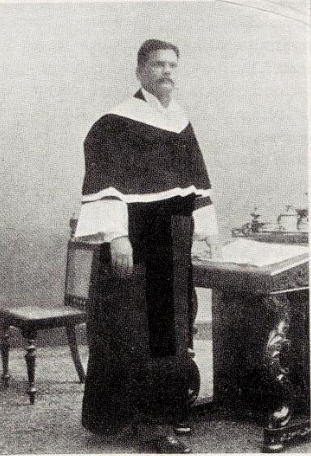
- Born: 4 July 1852; Jaffna
- Died: 26 May 1926 (aged 73); Colombo
- Occupation(s): Barrister and colonial judge
- Spouse: Lydia Drieberg
- Children: 6 sons and 3 daughters

Joseph Richard Grenier (4 July 1852 – 26 May 1926), a Frenchman by descent, was a barrister and a Puisne Judge of the Supreme Court of Ceylon.

== Early life and education ==
Grenier was born on 4 July 1852 at Jaffna, Ceylon, the son of Frederick Grenier, Secretary of the District Court of Jaffna. Descending from a noble French family, his grandfather, Jean François Grenier, settled in Jaffna in the 1800s.

He was educated at St Thomas' College, Colombo. In 1873, he was admitted an advocate of the Supreme Court of Ceylon, and in 1906 was called to the English Bar at Gray's Inn.

== Career ==
Grenier began his career practising in Jaffna but subsequently went to Colombo where he held various judicial appointments under the Ceylon Government. In turn, he served as Police Magistrate, Commissioner of Requests, Deputy Queen's Advocate, District Judge of Colombo, Solicitor-General, and Commissioner of Assize. He became the leader of the Bar and was made a K.C. In 1910, he rose to the Bench of the Supreme Court as Puisne Judge but retired on reaching the age limit.

== Personal life and death ==
Grenier married Lydia Drieberg in 1875, daughter of the Proctor of the Supreme Court of Ceylon, and together they had six sons and three daughters. He served as President of the YMCA of Ceylon. His autobiography "Leaves from my Life" published in 1923 attracted much attention in Ceylon owing to the candour with which he wrote of people and events. Grenier died in Colombo on 26 May 1926.
