= Nandadasa Kodagoda =

Deshamanya Professor Nandadasa Kodagoda
- Born: 31 October 1929; Hikkaduwa Sri Lanka
- Died: 2 August 1997 (aged 67); Colombo, Sri Lanka
- Education: Mahinda College, Galle
- Occupations: Vice Chancellor; Professor
- Known for: Vice Chancellor of the University of Colombo
- Spouse(s): Ratnavali Kodagoda (née de Costa)
- Children: 2, including Yasantha

Deshamanya Nandadasa Kodagoda MRCP (31 October 1929 – 2 August 1997) was a Sri Lankan medical doctor and academic who was Vice Chancellor of the University of Colombo.

Kodagoda graduated as a MBBS doctor in 1956 and initially worked for government hospitals of Galle, Colombo, & Karawanella. Later in 1958, he joined the academic staff of the Colombo Medical School as a junior lecturer.

Subsequently, he held the positions of Professor of Forensic Medicine of the University of Colombo, Head of the Department of Forensic Medicine, Dean of the Faculty of Medicine before becoming the Vice Chancellor of the Colombo University. He has also served as the Chairman of the National Dangerous Drugs Control Board, and as the Director of the Institute of Indigenous Medicine of the University of Colombo.

Kodagoda was educated at Nalanda College Colombo and Mahinda College Galle. During the time he spent as a school boy at Mahinda College, Kodagoda did very well in HSC ( Higher School Certificate) and the practical exam in the university and the interview to enter the Medical College.

Kodagoda died in Colombo on 2 August 1997, at the age of 67.

== Sources ==
- "A post-war challenge for Sri Lanka: Dismantling the LTTE overseas and rebuilding a Sri Lankan identity". Sri Lanka Guardian. 4 August 2010.
- "National Tree and National Flower: how they came to be selected". "The Island" by UPALI NEWSPAPERS (PVT) LTD. December 13, 2010.
- National Awards Conferred by His Excellency the President of Sri Lanka
