= Dodwell Browne =

Puisne Justice of the Supreme Court of Ceylon
- In office 1895–1895

Judge of the District Court of Colombo
- In office 1893–1903

Member of the Colombo Municipal Council
- In office November 1890 – May 1891

Dodwell Francis Browne (1841–1920) was an Irish barrister. He was appointed a Puisne Justice of the Supreme Court of Ceylon in 1895.

== Life ==
He was the son of Neal O'Donel Browne of Rathain (Rahins, Raheens) and his wife Sarah Labertouche, daughter of Abel Labertouche. With a B.A. from Trinity College, Dublin, he was admitted to the Middle Temple in 1865. He graduated LL.B. from Trinity College, and was called to the Irish Bar.

Browne was admitted an advocate of the Ceylon Supreme Court in 1872. By 1876 he owned an Irish estate of 703 acres (284 ha) at Raheens in County Mayo, a townland of Islandeady. He was a judge of the Colombo District Court from 1893 to 1903.

In 1903 Browne retired on a pension. He became a Justice of the Peace in County Mayo, and resided on his estate. He died at home in July 1920.

== Family ==
Browne married in 1871 Annabella Glenny, daughter of Samuel Glenny of Liverpool. They had three sons and a daughter, of whom the eldest, Dodwell Browne, graduated M.B. at Trinity College, Dublin, and emigrated to Western Australia.

Legal offices
Preceded by	Puisne Justice of the Supreme Court of Ceylon; 1895-1895	Succeeded by
