= Shiran Gooneratne =

Puisne justice of the Supreme Court of Sri Lanka since 2020

The Honourable Shiran Gooneratne

Puisne Justice of the Supreme Court of Sri Lanka
- Incumbent
- Assumed office 1 December 2020
- Appointed by: Gotabaya Rajapaksa

Judge of the Court of Appeal of Sri Lanka
- In office 11 July 2017 – 1 December 2020
- Appointed by: Maithripala Sirisena

Personal details
- Born: A. L. Shiran Gooneratne

A. L. Shiran Gooneratne is a Sri Lankan lawyer serving since 1 December 2020 as a puisne justice of the Supreme Court of Sri Lanka. He was appointed by President Gotabaya Rajapaksa.

== Career ==
Gooneratne previously served as a judge of the Court of Appeal of Sri Lanka from 11 July 2017 to 1 December 2020, having been appointed by President Maithripala Sirisena.

== Notes ==
- "Hon. A. L. Shiran Gooneratne". Supreme Court of Sri Lanka. 18 November 2026. Archived from the original on 19 April 2026.
