= Dilip Nawaz =

Puisne justice of the Supreme Court of Sri Lanka since 2020

The Honourable Dilip Nawaz

Puisne Justice of the Supreme Court of Sri Lanka
- Incumbent
- Assumed office 1 December 2020
- Appointed by: Gotabaya Rajapaksa

President of the Court of Appeal of Sri Lanka
- In office 3 February 2020 – 1 December 2020
- Appointed by: Gotabaya Rajapaksa

Judge of the Court of Appeal of Sri Lanka
- Appointed by: Mahinda Rajapaksa

Personal details
- Born: A. H. M. Dilip Nawaz

A. H. M. Dilip Nawaz is a Sri Lankan lawyer serving since 1 December 2020 as a puisne justice of the Supreme Court of Sri Lanka. He was appointed by President Gotabaya Rajapaksa.

== Career ==
Nawaz was appointed acting president of the Court of Appeal of Sri Lanka on 20 January 2020 by President Gotabaya Rajapaksa and formally appointed as president on 3 February 2020, in addition to his duties as a judge of the court.

== Controversy ==
In March 2026, Nawaz moved to the Karnataka High Court in India, seeking the court's intervention to direct Google India to remove alleged defamatory content and URLs of news reports about him from Google Search results.
