= Sampath B. Abeykoon =

Puisne justice of the Supreme Court of Sri Lanka since 2025

The Honourable Sampath B. Abeykoon

Puisne Justice of the Supreme Court of Sri Lanka
- Incumbent
- Assumed office 12 January 2025
- Appointed by: Anura Kumara Dissanayake

Judge of the Court of Appeal of Sri Lanka
- In office 1 December 2020 – 12 January 2025
- Appointed by: Gotabaya Rajapaksa

Personal details
- Born: Sampath B. Abeykoon

Sampath B. Abeykoon is a Sri Lankan lawyer serving since 12 January 2025 as a puisne justice of the Supreme Court of Sri Lanka. He was appointed by President Anura Kumara Dissanayake.

== Career ==
Abeykoon previously served as a judge of the Court of Appeal of Sri Lanka from 1 December 2020 to 12 January 2025, having been appointed by President Gotabaya Rajapaksa.
