= John Page Middleton =

British barrister and colonial judge (1851-1932)

Sir John Page Middleton
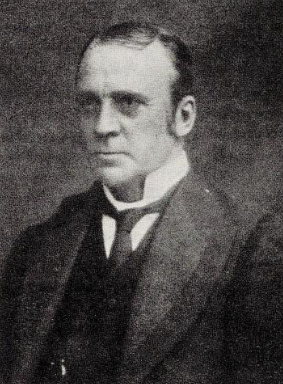
- Circa 1900s
- Born: 8 June 1851
- Died: 17 June 1932 (aged 81)
- Education: Trinity Hall, Cambridge
- Occupations: Barrister and colonial judge
- Years active: 1874-1912
- Spouse: Caroline Bell
- Children: 2 sons and 1 daughter

Sir John Page Middleton (8 June 1851 – 17 June 1932) was a British barrister and colonial judge.

== Early life and education ==
John Page Middleton was born on 8 June 1851. He was educated at Uppingham School and at Trinity Hall, Cambridge. In 1874, he was called to the Bar of Middle Temple.

== Career ==
Middleton went on the Norfolk and South-Eastern Circuits from 1874 to 1882. In 1882, he went to West Africa where he was Acting Queen's Advocate of the Gold Coast Colony. The following year he went to Cyprus where, from 1883 to 1892, he served as President of the District Court of Limassol and Puisne Judge. From 1892 to 1902, he served as Puisne Judge of the Supreme Court of Ceylon. In 1894, he served as Judge at the British Consular Court at Constantinople. He retired in 1912.

He published: Cyprus under British Rule, Quarterly Review, 1917; A Sketch of the Ottoman Land Code in Cyprus, 1900; and Journal of Comparative Legislation, 1900.

== Personal life and death ==
In 1875, Middleton married Caroline Bell and they had two sons and a daughter. He died on 17 June 1932.

== Honours ==
Middleton was appointed Knight Bachelor on 14 June 1912.
