= George Harry Franklyn Cannon =

British expatriate judge (1885-1966)

George Harry Franklyn Cannon (1885 – 15 February 1966) was a British barrister, expatriate judge and acting Chief Justice, who served in the Supreme Court of Ceylon and the Supreme Court of Jamaica in the 1930s and 1940s.

== Early life and education ==
Cannon was born in 1885. He was educated privately and at St John's College, Oxford as a Casberd Scholar. During the First World War, he served in France and Italy from 1916–1918, and was mentioned in despatches. In 1920, while on the Army's Special List, he was promoted to the rank of captain.

== Career ==
In 1921, Cannon was called to the bar of the Inner Temple, and began practising as a barrister on the western circuit handling criminal cases. In 1928, he went to the Bahamas where he served for three years as stipendiary magistrate and coroner. In 1934, he was appointed a judge of the Supreme Court of Jamaica, while on occasion serving as Acting Chief Justice, remaining in the post until 1939. In 1939, he was transferred to Ceylon where he was a puisne judge of the Supreme Court of Ceylon until 1947.

== Personal life and death ==
Cannon married Ivy Pigott. He died in Hampshire on 15 February 1966.
