= Sarath de Abrew =

Sri Lankan judge (1953–2016)

Puisne Justice of the Supreme Court of Sri Lanka
- In office 7 May 2014 – January 2016
- Appointed by: Mahinda Rajapaksa
- Succeeded by: H. N. J. Perera

Judge of the Court of Appeal of Sri Lanka
- In office 2006–2014

Personal details
- Born: 1953 Dominion of Ceylon
- Died: 15 August 2016 (aged 63) Ratmalana, Western Province, Sri Lanka
- Education: Sri Lanka Law College

Sarath de Abrew (c. 1953 – 15 August 2016) was a Sri Lankan judge and lawyer. He was a judge of the Supreme Court of Sri Lanka.

Educated at S. Thomas' College, Mount Lavinia, he graduated from University of Colombo with an LL.B. and took oaths as an attorney in 1977.

He joined the Attorney General's Department as a State Counsel in 1979 and served until 1981. He was thereafter appointed as a judicial officer, serving as Magistrate in Trincomalee. He went on to serve in several appointments around the island until he was appointed as a Judge of the High Court in 1999. He was serving as the High Court Judge in Kalutara when he was promoted as a Judge of the Court of Appeal of Sri Lanka in 2006.

De Abrew was appointed to the Supreme Court of Sri Lanka in 2014. While in office he was indicted at the Colombo High Court for an alleged sexual assault on a housemaid in 2015 and retired in early 2016. The case against him was fixed for hearing on May 23 by Colombo High Court after he pleaded not guilty. The Attorney General indicted de Abrew under Clause-365 of the Penal Code on two counts of sexual abuse and assault in June 2015 at Ratmalana. This is the first and only occasion of a judge of the Supreme Court of Sri Lanka being indicted on criminal charges.

In late 2015, Sarath de Abrew sent in papers of his intent to retire, and left office in early January 2016.

He died at the age of 63 on 15 August 2016 after falling off the roof of his house. His head had hit the paving on the pathway. De Abrew was pronounced dead on admission to Kalubowila hospital.

He was the President of the Judicial Service Association and the Vice President of the High Court Judges Association.
