= Christopher Temple =

18th Puisne Justice of the Supreme Court of Ceylon
- In office 28 January 1854 – 1873
- Appointed by: George William Anderson

Judge of the District Court of Colombo
- In office 1 June 1945 – 1854

Deputy Queen's Advocate of Ceylon
- In office 17 October 1840 – 1945

Personal details
- Education: University of Cambridge

Christopher Temple was a Puisne Justice of the Supreme Court of Ceylon from 1854 to 1873. Temple had served as Deputy Queen's Advocate of Ceylon and Judge of the District Court of Colombo prior to being elevated as a Puisne Justice. He was appointed Senior Puisne Justice on 1 January 1863 and acted as Chief Justice when Chief Justice Edward Shepherd Creasy went on leave on 7 September 1869.

Legal offices
Preceded by	Puisne Justice of the Supreme Court of Ceylon; 1854-1873	Succeeded by
