= Chief Justice of Sri Lanka =

Head of judiciary of Sri Lanka

- අග්‍ර විනිශ්චයකාර பிரதம நீதியரசர்
- Incumbent; Padman Surasena since 27 July 2025
- Style: The Honourable (formal); Your Honour (within court)
- Nominator: President of Sri Lanka
- Appointer: The President; with Constitutional Council advice and consent
- Term length: Until the age of sixty-five years
- Constituting instrument: Royal Charter of Justice of 1801 in reference with the Constitution of Sri Lanka.
- Formation: March 1801
- First holder: Codrington Edmund Carrington
- Website: supremecourt.lk

The chief justice of the Democratic Socialist Republic of Sri Lanka is the head of the judiciary of Sri Lanka and the Supreme Court of Sri Lanka. Established in 1801, the chief justice is one of ten Supreme Court justices; the other nine are the puisne justices of the Supreme Court of Sri Lanka. The post was created in 1801. The chief justice is nominated by the Constitutional Council, and appointed by the president. The first chief justice was Codrington Edmund Carrington. The current and 49th chief justice is Padman Surasena.

== History ==
The office of chief justice traces its origins back with the founding the Royal Charter of Justice of 1801 (now this provision is as set out in the Constitution of Sri Lanka) by the United Kingdom. With the establishment of the Supreme Court, it was to consist of one principal judge who shall be called "The Chief Justice of the Supreme Court of Judicature in the Island of Ceylon" and one other judge, who was to be called "The Puisne Justice of the Supreme Court of Judicature in the Island of Ceylon". The charter required the chief justice and puisne justice to have not less than five years of experience as barristers, in England or Ireland to be named and appointed.

The post was first held by Codrington Edmund Carrington.

=== Controversy of 2013–2015 ===
The chief justice Mohan Peiris PC was appointed on 15 January 2013 following the controversial impeachment of Shirani Bandaranayake. Peiris was elevated by President Mahinda Rajapaksa with the approval of the Parliamentary Council. Peiris' appointment drew some criticism. Peiris was considered to be an ally of President Rajapaksa, and his appointment was seen by critics as further consolidation of power by the president and his family. Prior to his appointment he was Chairman of Seylan Bank, Senior Legal Officer to the Cabinet and held the post of attorney general. Peiris was officially inaugurated as chief justice at a ceremony in the Supreme Court on 23 January 2013. On 28 January 2015 Peiris was removed from office and his tenure demoted as de facto chief justice as the Government of Sri Lanka acknowledged that his appointment was void at its inception as the sitting judge, Shirani Bandaranayake, was not impeached lawfully and therefore no vacancy existed for the post.

== Appointment ==
The appointment and removal of judges of the Supreme Court is outlined in Chapter XV Article 107 of the Sri Lankan Constitution. It states that "the Chief Justice and every other Judge of the Supreme Court shall be appointed by the President of the Republic by warrant under his hand". Judges of the Supreme Court shall hold office until the age of retirement of sixty-five years. Article 109 describes appointments of an acting chief justice or Judge of the Supreme Court. The president shall appoint another judge of the Supreme Court to act in the office of chief justice when the incumbent is "temporarily unable to exercise, perform and discharge the powers, duties and functions of his office, by reason of illness, absence from the country or any other cause" during such period. Each person appointed to or to act as chief justice or a judge of the Supreme Court shall only take office and enter upon its duties after taking the oath or the affirmation set out in the Fourth Schedule of the Constitution.

=== Oath of office ===
"I ............................................................. do solemnly declare and affirm / swear that I will faithfully perform the duties and discharge the functions of the office of Chief Justice in accordance with the Constitution of the Democratic Socialist Republic of Sri Lanka and the law, and that I will be faithful to the Republic of Sri Lanka and that I will to the best of my ability uphold and defend the Constitution of the Democratic Socialist Republic of Sri Lanka."

=== Removal of office ===
Judges of the Supreme Court shall hold office during good behaviour. Removal of a judge shall only proceed with an address of the Parliament supported by a majority of the total number of members of Parliament, (including those who are not present), and then by an order of the president. Reasons for such removal should be on the grounds of proved misbehaviour or incapacity.

== Duties ==
The chief justice serves as chairman of the Judicial Service Commission (JSC), which consist of two judges of the Supreme Court appointed by the president of the republic. The mission of the JSC is to accelerate the development of the nation by ensuring prompt and equal protection of the law to every citizen through providing infrastructure services required for administration of justice, safeguarding the independence of judges and maintaining proper human resources management in the support staffs in court. Other duties of the chief justice include nominating judges, as may be necessary, to each such high court. Every judge shall be transferable by the chief justice.

Since its inception in the early nineteenth century, the chief justice was the second in line as the officer administrating the colony of Ceylon in the absence of the governor of Ceylon and the chief secretary of the colony; discharging the duties of Acting Governor of Ceylon. Following Ceylon gaining self-rule in 1948, the chief justice became the first in line as the officer administrating the government in the absence of the governor general of Ceylon serving as the acting governor general of Ceylon. This practice continued after the republican constitution was adopted in 1972 and the Dominion of Ceylon became the Republic of Sri Lanka, with the chief justice serving as acting president during the absence of the president of Sri Lanka. This capacity ceased with the second amendment to the republican constitution in 1978, when the executive presidency was established and order of succession defined.

== Precedence, salary, residence and privileges ==
The chief justice is ranked fourth in the order of precedence after the president, prime minister and the speaker of the Parliament. From 1948 to 1978 the speaker ranked third in the precedence after the governor general/president and the prime minister. After the second amendment to the republican constitution in 1978, in which the chief justice was removed from the presidential line of succession; the chief justice gained his current position in the order of precedence.

In 2016, the chief justice received a salary of Rs. 145,000 per month and an annual increment of Rs 7,250. In addition, the chief justice can use the Chief Justice's House in Colombo and is entitled to an official vehicle, usually a black Mercedes-Benz S-Class, and security provided from the Judicial Security Division of the Sri Lanka Police. On retirement the chief justice is entitled to a pension and his wife and children are entitled to a W&OP entitlement under the Widows Widowers & Orphans Pension Act. As with other government department heads the chief justice his entitled to take ownership of the official vehicle he used in his tenure or the highest grade duty free permit to import a vehicle for use in retirement. As with other judges of the Supreme Court, a former chief justice is bared from taking up a legal practice in the retirement.

== Dress ==
The chief justice like other supreme court judges wear scarlet gowns when attending court. On ceremonial occasions (such as ceremonial sittings of the Supreme Court) they would wear a scarlet gown, barrister's bands and mantle and a long wig.

== List of chief justices ==
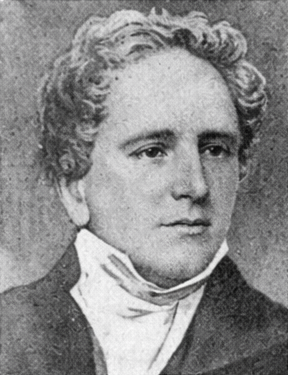
Alexander Johnston (1811–1819)

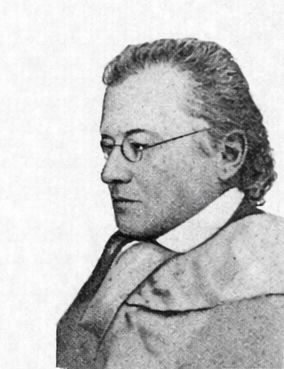
Edward Creasy (1860–1875)

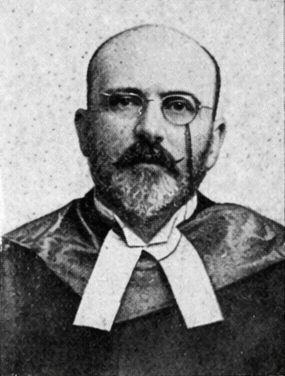
John Winfield Bonser (1893–1902)

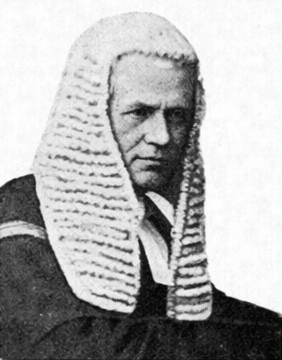
Alexander Wood Renton (1914–1918)

Since the establishment of the Supreme Court in 1801, the following has served as chief justice:

As of 27 July 2025

List of Chief Justices: 1801–present
No.	Name	Appointed by	Term			Ref.
No.	Name	Appointed by	Start	End	Length	Ref.
Chief Justice of British Ceylon: 1801–1948			Start	End	Length	
1	Codrington Edmund Carrington	North	March 1801	2 April 1806	5	
2	Edmund Henry Lushington	Maitland	15 April 1807	1809	1–2	
3	Alexander Johnston	Wilson (Note: The appointment was made in the capacity of acting governor.)	6 November 1811	1819	7–8	
4	Ambrose Hardinge Giffard	Brownrigg	8 April 1819	2 March 1827	7 years, 328 days	
5	Richard Ottley	Barnes	1 November 1827	1833	5–6	
6	Charles Marshall	Wilmot-Horton	18 February 1833	3 March 1836	3 years, 14 days	
7	William Norris	Wilmot-Horton	27 April 1836	1837	0–1	
8	Anthony Oliphant	Stewart-Mackenzie	22 October 1838	1854	15–16	
9	William Ogle Carr	Anderson	17 April 1854	1856	1–2	
10	William Carpenter Rowe	Ward	1857	1859	1–2	
11	Edward Shepherd Creasy	Ward	27 March 1860	1875	14–15	
12	William Hackett (Note: Died in office.)	Gregory	3 February 1877	17 May 1877	103 days	
13	John Budd Phear	Longden	18 October 1877	30 September 1879	1 year, 347 days	
14	Richard Cayley	Longden	1 October 1879	1882	2–3	
15	Jacobus de Wet	Longden	31 May 1882	29 May 1883	363 days	
16	Bruce Burnside	Longden	21 May 1883	1893	9–10	
17	John Winfield Bonser	Havelock	13 November 1893	1902	8–9	
18	Charles Layard	Ridgeway	26 April 1902	18 June 1906	4 years, 53 days	
19	Joseph Turner Hutchinson	Blake	23 October 1906	1 May 1911	4 years, 190 days	
20	Alfred Lascelles	McCallum	1 May 1911	1914	2–3	
21	Alexander Wood Renton	Chalmers	22 August 1914	1918	3–4	
22	Anton Bertram	Stubbs	26 July 1918	1925	6–7	
23	Charles Ernest St. John Branch	Clementi	3 July 1925	25 May 1926	326 days	
24	Stanley Fisher	Clifford	11 December 1926	1930	3–4	
25	Philip James Macdonell	Stanley	3 October 1930	1936	5–6	
26	Sidney Abrahams	Stubbs	3 July 1936	December 1939	3	
27	John Curtois Howard	Caldecott	1 December 1939	1949	9–10	
Chief Justice of Ceylon: 1948–1972
28	Arthur Wijewardena	Moore	15 January 1949	1950	0–1	
29	Edward Jayetileke	Ramsbotham	1950	11 October 1951	0–1	
30	Alan Rose	Ramsbotham	11 October 1951	1956	4–5	
31	Hema Henry Basnayake	Goonetilleke	1 January 1956	3 August 1964	8 years, 215 days	
32	Miliani Sansoni	Gopallawa	3 August 1964	17 November 1966	2 years, 106 days	
33	Hugh Norman Gregory Fernando	Gopallawa	20 November 1966	17 November 1973	6 years, 362 days	
Chief Justice of Sri Lanka: 1972–present
34	Gardiye Punchihewage Amaraseela Silva	Gopallawa	1973	1974	0–1	
35	Victor Tennekoon	Gopallawa	1 January 1974	8 September 1977	3 years, 250 days	
36	Neville Samarakoon	Jayewardene	1977	21 October 1984	6–7	
37	Suppiah Sharvananda	Jayewardene	29 October 1984	22 February 1988	3 years, 116 days	
38	Parinda Ranasinghe	Jayewardene	1988	1991	2–3	
39	Herbert Thambiah	Premadasa	1991	14 October 1991	0	
40	G. P. S. de Silva	Premadasa	1991	1999	7–8	
41	Sarath N. Silva	Kumaratunga	16 September 1999	7 June 2009	9 years, 264 days	
42	Asoka de Silva	Rajapaksa	8 June 2009	17 May 2011	1 year, 343 days	
43	Shirani Bandaranayake	Rajapaksa	18 May 2011	13 January 2013	1 year, 240 days	(Note: Shirani Bandaranayake was impeached by Parliament on 11 January 2013, with 155 votes in favour and 49 against. She was subsequently removed from office on 13 January 2013 after President Mahinda Rajapaksa ratified the impeachment motion.)
—N/a	Mohan Peiris	Rajapaksa	15 January 2013	28 January 2015	2 years, 13 days	(Note: Following the election of President Maithripala Sirisena, the government declared Mohan Peiris’s appointment as Chief Justice void ab initio, leading to his removal from office and the reinstatement of Shirani Bandaranayake.)
(43)	Shirani Bandaranayake	Sirisena	28 January 2015	29 January 2015	1 day	
44	K. Sripavan	Sirisena	30 January 2015	28 February 2017	2 years, 29 days	
45	Priyasath Dep	Sirisena	1 March 2017	12 October 2018	1 year, 225 days	
46	Nalin Perera	Sirisena	12 October 2018	29 April 2019	199 days	
47	Jayantha Jayasuriya	Sirisena	29 April 2019	10 October 2024	5 years, 164 days	
48	Murdu Fernando	Dissanayake	2 December 2024	27 July 2025	237 days	(Note: Murdu Fernando was appointed as the Acting Chief Justice on 10 October 2024 and served in that position until 2 December 2024.)
49	Padman Surasena	Dissanayake	27 July 2025	Incumbent	1 year, 76 days	

=== Acting chief justices ===
Throughout history, particularly during interregnums, there have been instances where provisional or acting chief justices have been appointed. Notable individuals who have served in this capacity include:

As of 28 February 2025

List of acting chief justices
Name	Appointed by	Start / end / length of service	Ref.
Alexander Johnston	Maitland	3 April 1806 – 4 March 1807; 335 days	
William Coke	Maitland	6 March 1809 – 1811	
Charles Marshall	Wilmot-Horton	18 February 1833 – 1836	
William Rough	Wilmot-Horton	9 March 1836 – April 1836; April 1837 – 1838	
Paul Ivy Sterling	Ward	1859–1860	
Richard Morgan	Gregory	1875	
Charles Henry Stewart	Gregory	1875–1876	
George Campbell Anderson	Gregory	1876–1877	
Lovell Burchett Clarence	Longden	1882	
Alfred Lascelles	Blake	1906	
William Thomas Porter	Manning	1921	
Francis Soertsz	Caldecott; Moore	1939; 1945, 1946	
C. Nagalingam	Goonetilleke	1954	
Eugene Reginald de Fonseka	Goonetilleke	1960, 1962	
Murdu Fernando	Dissanayake	10 October – 2 December 2024; 53 days	

== See also ==
- List of justices of the Supreme Court of Sri Lanka by court composition

== Notes ==
Sources

- "Justices of the Supreme Court and A Historical Lineage of Chief Justices". Supreme Court of Sri Lanka.
- Amerasinghe, A. Ranjit B. (1986). The Supreme Court of Sri Lanka: The First 185 Years. Sarvodaya Book Pub. Services. ISBN 978-955-599-000-4.
- "Name list of Chief Justices". Judicial Service Commission. 2013. Archived from the original on 19 October 2013.
