= Nimal Gamini Amaratunga =

Sri Lankan judge

Puisne Justice of the Supreme Court of Sri Lanka
- In office January 2005 – March 2014

Personal details
- Education: University of Colombo; International Maritime Law Institute

Ranasinghe Arachchige Nimal Gamini Amaratunga is a Puisne Justice of the Supreme Court of Sri Lanka. He was appointed in January 2005. Amaratunga completed his primary education from Maliyadeva College in Kurunegala. Thereafter, Amaratunga attended University of Colombo obtaining a Bachelor of Laws Degree (LLB) in 1970. In October 1972, he was called to the Bar. He joined the Attorney General's Department in 1978 as an Acting State Counsel was appointed a State Counsel on 1 June 1979. Whilst still at the Attorney General's Department, in 1984, he obtained the Post Graduate Degree of Master of Laws (LLM) from the University of Colombo. Amaratunga has also obtained a second Post Graduate degree of 'Master of Laws' from the International Maritime Law Institute in Malta, in 1990. He was promoted to Senior State Counsel on 8 September 1988.

On 6 January 1994, he was appointed a judge of the High Court. He has served as a High Court Judge in Ampara, Colombo, Badulla, Kegalle and Kurunegala. On 28 February 2001, Amaratunga was appointed as a judge of the Court of Appeal and has acted as a judge of the Court of Appeal since January 2001. He was made a Puisne Justice of the Supreme Court of Sri Lanka in January 2005. He retired in 2014
