= Charles Henry Stewart =

Puisne Justice of the Supreme Court of Ceylon

Sir Charles Henry Stewart CMG

25th Puisne Justice of the Supreme Court of Ceylon
- In office 11 January 1867 – 1879
- Preceded by: Henry Byerley Thomson

Personal details
- Born: 1824
- Died: 1894 (aged 69–70) London

Sir Charles Henry Stewart (1824–1894) was a Puisne Justice of the Supreme Court of Ceylon who served from 1867 to 1879, except while on leave during 1 January – 28 April 1871 when George Lawson acted for him. He was knighted by Queen Victoria and married Helen Margaret Mackenzie, daughter of Thomas Mackenzie, chief of the Mackenzies of Dundonnell. He was a member of Lincoln's Inn and the Thatched House Club in London. He is the great great uncle of Nalin Thomas Jay, who is also a member of Lincoln's Inn and currently CEO of Carnegie Stewart in Hong Kong.

== Bibliography ==
- Amerasinghe, A. Ranjit B. (1986). The Supreme Court of Sri Lanka : the first 185 years (465/1000 ed.). Ratmalana: Sarvodaya Book Pub. Services. ISBN 978-955-599-000-4.

Legal offices
Preceded by Henry Byerley Thomson	Puisne Justice of the Supreme Court of Ceylon; 1867-1879	Succeeded by
