= Menaka Wijesundara =

Puisne justice of the Supreme Court of Sri Lanka since 2025

The Honourable Menaka Wijesundara

Puisne Justice of the Supreme Court of Sri Lanka
- Incumbent
- Assumed office 12 January 2025
- Appointed by: Anura Kumara Dissanayake

Judge of the Court of Appeal of Sri Lanka
- In office 1 December 2020 – 12 January 2025
- Appointed by: Gotabaya Rajapaksa

Personal details
- Born: Menaka Wijesundara

Menaka Wijesundara is a Sri Lankan lawyer serving since 12 January 2025 as a puisne justice of the Supreme Court of Sri Lanka. She was appointed by President Anura Kumara Dissanayake.

== Career ==
Wijesundara previously served as a judge of the Court of Appeal of Sri Lanka from 1 December 2020 to 12 January 2025, having been appointed by President Gotabaya Rajapaksa.

== Notes ==
- "Hon. Justice Menaka Wijesundera". Supreme Court of Sri Lanka. 7 August 2025. Archived from the original on 19 April 2026.
