= Jayantha Jayasuriya =

Chief Justice of Sri Lanka from 2019 to 2024 and diplomat

His Excellency Jayantha Jayasuriya PC
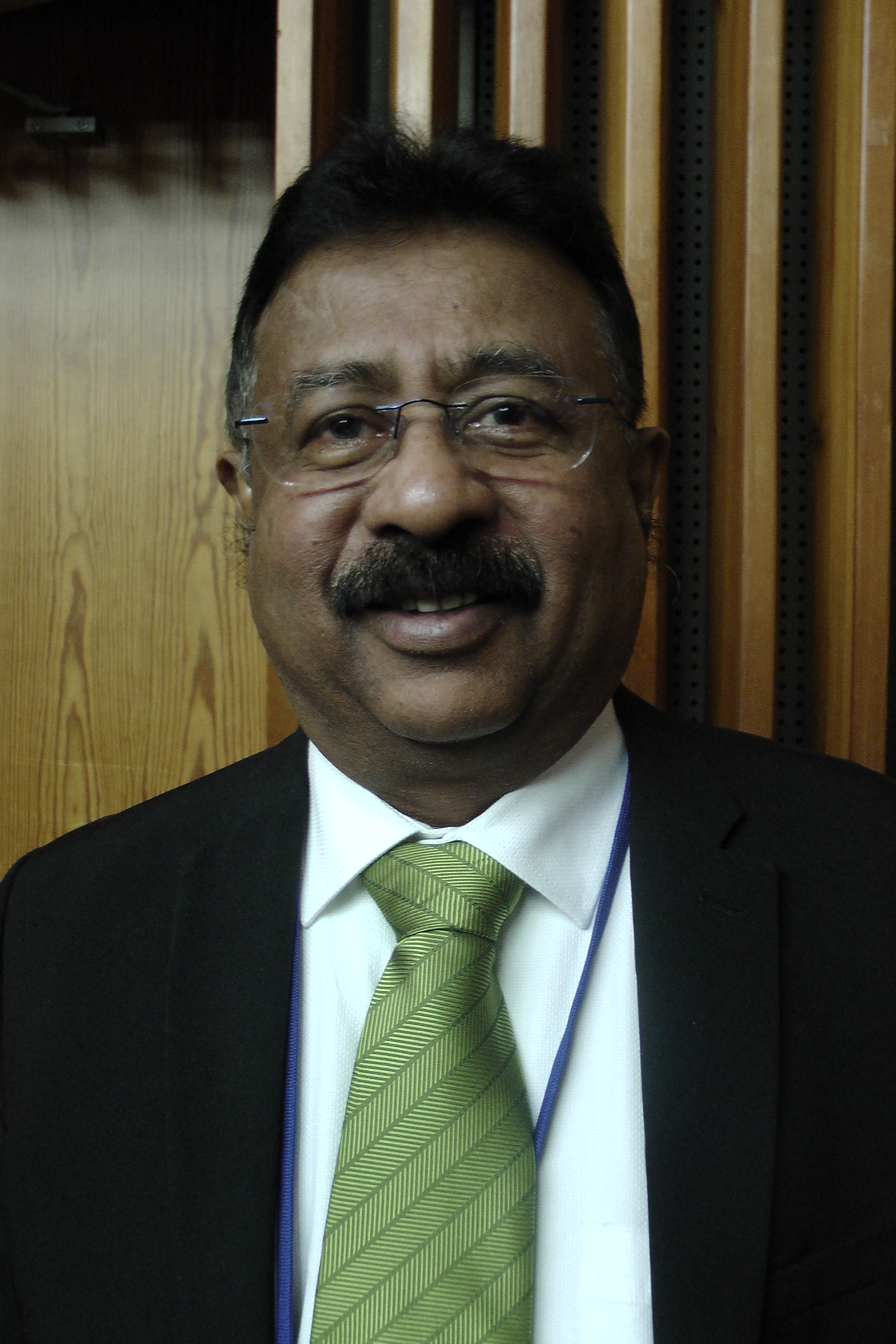

Permanent Representative of Sri Lanka to the United Nations
- Incumbent
- Assumed office 5 June 2025
- Appointed by: Anura Kumara Dissanayake
- Preceded by: Mohan Peiris

47th Chief Justice of Sri Lanka
- In office 29 April 2019 – 10 October 2024
- Appointed by: Maithripala Sirisena
- Preceded by: Nalin Perera
- Succeeded by: Murdu Fernando

45th Attorney General of Sri Lanka
- In office 11 January 2016 – 29 April 2019
- Appointed by: Maithripala Sirisena
- Preceded by: Yuwanjana Wijayatilake
- Succeeded by: Dappula de Livera

Personal details
- Born: Jayantha Chandrasiri Jayasuriya
- Education: Maliyadeva College; Sri Lanka Law College

Jayantha Chandrasiri Jayasuriya, PC (Sinhala: ජයන්ත චන්ද්‍රසිරි ජයසූරිය) is a lawyer who is currently serving as the Permanent Representative of Sri Lanka to the United Nations since 5 June 2025.

He previously served as the 47th Chief Justice of Sri Lanka from 29 April 2019 to 10 October 2024. Jayasuriya was approved by the Constitutional Council on 26 April 2019 and sworn in three days later on 29 April by President Maithripala Sirisena, succeeding Chief Justice Nalin Perera. He also served as the 45th Attorney General of Sri Lanka from 11 January 2016 to 29 April 2019.

While serving as Attorney General Jayasuriya defended the sacking of the Prime Minister by the President of Sri Lanka but was over-ruled by the Supreme Court. Jayasuriya controversially requested an extension of the term of office of President Sirisena prior to being made Chief Justice. The Supreme Court overruled that request.

Jayasuriya took oath as an Attorney-at-Law of the Supreme Court of Sri Lanka in 1982. He joined the Attorney General’s Department as a State Counsel and held the posts of Senior State Counsel, Deputy Solicitor General, Additional Solicitor General, and Senior Additional Solicitor General before being appointed Attorney General. Jayasuriya studied at Maliyadeva College.

== Career ==
=== Permanent representative to the United Nations ===
On 21 March 2025, the Committee on High Posts in the Parliament of Sri Lanka recommended Jayasuriya's appointment as Permanent Representative of Sri Lanka to the United Nations in New York. His appointment was confirmed by the president on 15 May 2025.

On 5 June 2025, Jayasuriya presented his letter of credence as the Permanent Representative of Sri Lanka, to the Secretary-General of the United Nations António Guterres.

== See also ==
- Sri Lankan Non Career Diplomats

Legal offices
Preceded by Yuwanjana Wijayatilake	Attorney General of Sri Lanka; 2014–2019	Succeeded by Dappula de Livera
Preceded by Nalin Perera	Chief Justice of Sri Lanka; 2019–2024	Succeeded by Murdu Fernando

Diplomatic posts
Preceded by Mohan Peiris	Permanent Representative of Sri Lanka to the United Nations; 2025–present	Incumbent
