= William Thomas Porter =

British barrister and colonial judge (1877-1928)

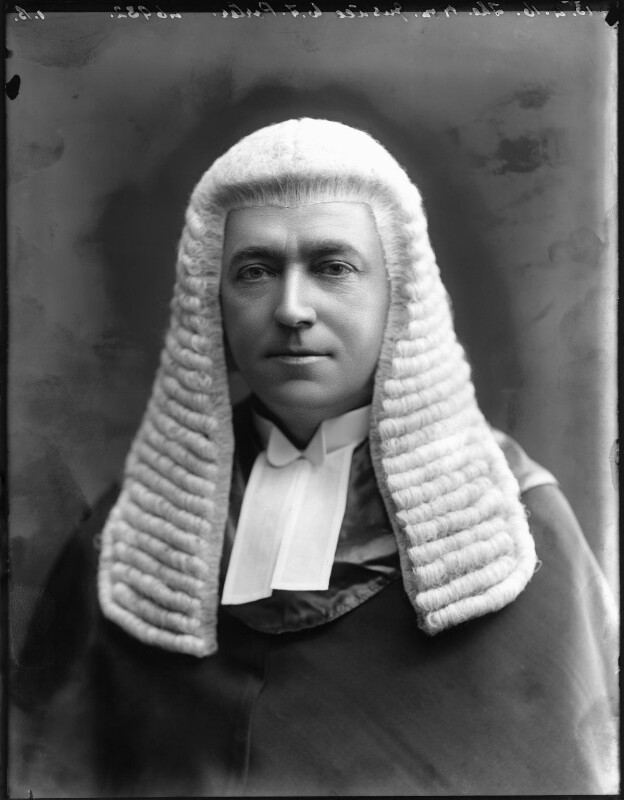
- Porter in 1916
- Born: 21 June 1877; Lancashire
- Died: 11 January 1928 (aged 50)
- Education: Jesus College, Cambridge
- Occupations: Barrister and colonial judge
- Years active: 1901-1925

William Thomas Porter (21 June 1877 – 11 January 1928) was a British barrister and colonial judge.

== Early life and education ==
Porter was born on 21 June 1877 in Lancashire. He was educated privately and at Jesus College, Cambridge. In 1901, he was called to the Bar of the Inner Temple.

== Career ==
After joining the North Eastern Circuit he left England in 1907 and went to the East Africa Protectorate. That year he served as magistrate in Mombasa and Acting Administrator-General. In 1908, he was magistrate for the provinces of Kisumu and Naivasha.

In 1911, he went to Cyprus where he served as President of the District Court, and Puisne Judge. In 1915, he was appointed Judge of the Supreme Court of Gold Coast Colony where he served until 1921. From 1921 to 1924, he served as Judge and as Acting Chief Justice of the Supreme Court of Ceylon. He retired to Eastbourne due to poor health in 1924.

Porter died on 11 January 1928, aged 50.
