= George Lawson (judge) =

Puisne Justice of the Supreme Court of Ceylon

Acting Puisne Justice of the Supreme Court of Ceylon
- In office 1871–1872
- In office 1860–1861

Judge of the District Court of Colombo
- In office 1863–1872

Personal details
- Education: University of Cambridge

George Lawson was a Puisne Justice of the Supreme Court of Ceylon. Lawson was a co-founder of the Law Library of Colombo and it is believed he was of Jewish origin.

Legal offices
Preceded by	Puisne Justice of the Supreme Court of Ceylon; 1871-1872	Succeeded by
Preceded by	Puisne Justice of the Supreme Court of Ceylon; 1860-1861	Succeeded by
