= K. Sripavan =

Chief Justice of Sri Lanka from 2015 to 2017

- க. சிறீபவன் කේ. ශ්‍රීපවන්

44th Chief Justice of Sri Lanka
- In office 30 January 2015 – 28 February 2017
- Appointed by: Maithripala Sirisena
- Preceded by: Shirani Bandaranayake
- Succeeded by: Priyasath Dep

Puisne Justice of the Supreme Court of Sri Lanka
- In office 27 March 2008 – 30 January 2015
- Appointed by: Mahinda Rajapaksa
- Preceded by: Nihal Jayasinghe
- Succeeded by: Anil Gooneratne

President of the Court of Appeal of Sri Lanka
- In office 5 March 2007 – 27 March 2008
- Appointed by: Mahinda Rajapaksa

Judge of the Court of Appeal of Sri Lanka
- In office 29 May 2002 – 5 March 2007
- Appointed by: Chandrika Kumaratunga

Deputy Solicitor General of Sri Lanka
- In office 22 February 1996 – 29 May 2002

Personal details
- Born: 29 February 1952 (age 74)
- Education: Queen Mary and Westfield College
- Profession: Lawyer
- Ethnicity: Sri Lankan Tamil

Kanagasabapathy J. Sripavan (Tamil: கனகசபாபதி சிறீபவன் Kaṉakacapāpati Ciṟīpavaṉ, Sinhala: කනකසපාපති ශ්‍රීපවන් ; born 29 February 1952) is a Sri Lankan Tamil lawyer and judge. He was Deputy Solicitor General, judge and president of the Court of Appeal, Puisne Justice of the Supreme Court of Sri Lanka and the 44th Chief Justice of Sri Lanka.

== Early life and family ==
Sripavan was born on 29 February 1952. He is the son of Nadaraja Kanagasabapathy, an employee of Kankesanthurai Cement Factory. He was educated at Jaffna Hindu College between 1962 and 1972. He joined Sri Lanka Law College in 1974 and passed out as an attorney at law in 1976, obtaining a first class in the Intermediate Examination.

== Career ==
After qualifying Sripavan enrolled as an attorney-at-law on 23 August 1977 and practised law at the unofficial Bar of Sri Lanka between 1977 and 1978. He then joined the Attorney General's Department as an acting State Counsel on 13 February 1978. He became a permanent State Counsel on 1 January 1979. He was promoted to Senior State Counsel on 3 March 1989.

Sripavan was appointed Deputy Solicitor General on 22 February 1996. He was the head of the Court of Appeal Unit and worked on Court of Appeal and the Supreme Court cases including Bills and Fundamental Rights applications. He supervised state counsels and revenue matters. Sripavan continued his legal studies whilst working, obtaining a diploma in Industrial Law from the University of Colombo in 1992 and Master of Laws from the Queen Mary and Westfield College, part of the University of London, in 1994.

Sripavan was appointed a judge of the Court of Appeal on 29 May 2002. He went on to become president of the Court of Appeal on 5 March 2007. He was appointed to the Supreme Court on 27 March 2008, replacing retiring Justice Nihal Jayasinghe. He was acting Chief Justice on three occasions.

=== Chief justice ===
In January 2013 43rd Chief Justice Shirani Bandaranayake was controversially impeached by the Parliament of Sri Lanka. Bandaranayake was subsequently removed from office by President Mahinda Rajapaksa. Attorney General Mohan Peiris was appointed chief justice by Rajapaksa. Rajapaksa lost the 2015 presidential election after which the government led by newly elected President Maithripala Sirisena ruled that Bandaranayake's removal was "null and void" as it had not followed proper procedure. Peiris was sent a letter stating that his appointment had been illegal and then Bandaranayake was re-instated as chief justice on 28 January 2015. Peiris however claims that his removal from office is unconstitutional, saying that he neither retired, resigned or vacated office.

After resuming her position Bandaranayake announced that she would retire the following day - 29 January 2015. Sripavan was sworn in as Sri Lanka's 44th chief justice on 30 January 2015. He retired as chief justice on 28 February 2017.

Legal offices
Preceded by Shirani Bandaranayake	Chief Justice of Sri Lanka; 2015–2017	Succeeded by Priyasath Dep
Order of precedence
Preceded by Mahinda Rajapaksa as Former President	Order of Precedence of Sri Lanka as Chief Justice of Sri Lanka; 2015–2017	Succeeded by Prasanna Ranatunga as Chief Minister of Western Province
