= Gamini Amarasekera =

Sri Lankan puisne justice of the Supreme Court since 2019

The Honourable Gamini Amarasekera

Puisne Justice of the Supreme Court of Sri Lanka
- In office 9 January 2019 – 20 June 2025
- Appointed by: Maithripala Sirisena

Personal details
- Born: Gamini Amarasekera; 20 June 1960 (age 65)

Gamini Amarasekera (born 20 June 1960) is a Sri Lankan lawyer who served as a puisne justice of the Supreme Court of Sri Lanka. He was appointed by President Maithripala Sirisena on 9 January 2019.

Amarasekara retired on 20 June 2025 upon reaching the age of 65, which is the mandatory retirement age for a puisne justice of the Supreme Court.
