= Labour Tribunal =

Tribunals in Sri Lanka

Labour Tribunals are tribunals in Sri Lanka formed under the Industrial Disputes Act No. 62 of 1957, to adjudicate labour disputes and termination of employment.

It is also the name of an institution in Hong Kong. In 1997 the court was centralised in Mong Kok, Kowloon.
