= George Henry Withers =

Puisne Justice of the Supreme Court of Ceylon
- In office 1 January 1893 – 1900
- Succeeded by: Fredrick Charles Moncrieff

George Henry Withers was a Puisne Justice of the Supreme Court of Ceylon who served from 1 January 1893 to 1900. Withers had acted as Puisne Justice From 6 July 1892 to 1 January 1893.

Legal offices
| Preceded by | Puisne Justice of the Supreme Court of Ceylon; 1893-1900 | Succeeded by Fredrick Charles Moncrieff |
