= Lovell Burchett Clarence =

27th Puisne Justice of the Supreme Court of Ceylon
- In office 1 February 1876 – 1888
- Appointed by: William Henry Gregory
- Preceded by: Edward Shepherd Creasy

Acting Queen's Advocate of Ceylon
- In office 8 August 1874 – 10 December 1875
- Appointed by: William Henry Gregory

Deputy Queen's Advocate of Ceylon
- In office 30 January 1873 – 8 August 1874
- Appointed by: William Henry Gregory

Personal details
- Born: 8 June 1838 Lipscombe, Devon, England
- Died: 1917 (aged 78–79) Exeter, Devon, England
- Spouse(s): Blanche Gunter (m. 1867) Elizabeth Whitton (m. 1901)
- Education: Trinity College, Cambridge

Lovell Burchett Clarence (8 June 1838 – 1917) was a barrister and Puisne Justice of the Supreme Court of Ceylon from 1876 to 1888. Clarence went to the University of Cambridge and was called to the bar on 17 November 1864. Prior to serving as a Justice of the Supreme Court Clarence served as Deputy Queen's Advocate of Ceylon from 1873 to 1874 and Acting Queen's Advocate of Ceylon from 1874 to 1875 before being elevated to Second Puisne Justice on 1 February 1876 and finally Puisne Justice of the Supreme Court of Ceylon on 4 April 1876. Clarence was appointed to fill the vacancy caused by the retirement of Edward Shepherd Creasy. He was the 27th Supreme Court Justice.

Clarence married twice, first in 1867 to Blanche Gunter, secondly in 1901 to Elizabeth Whitton. Among his children were:

- George Clement Clarence, who m. 1902 Rose Caroline Alexandra McDowell, widow of Charles James Tolputt Merci, and daughter of George McDowell, FTCD.
- Oliver Burchett Clarence (1870–1955)

Legal offices
Preceded by Edward Shepherd Creasy	Puisne Justice of the Supreme Court of Ceylon; 1876-1888	Succeeded by
