= William Rough =

Sir William Rough (c.1772–1838) was an English lawyer, judge and poet.

== Life ==
The only son of William Rough of London, he was born on 21 August, in 1772 or 1773. He was admitted at the Westminster School on 23 January 1786, and became a king's scholar in 1789. At Westminster he is said to have contributed to Robert Southey's school periodical The Flagellant. Having been elected to a scholarship from Westminster at Trinity College, Cambridge, in 1792, aged 19, he matriculated on 6 June in that year, and proceeded B.A. 1796, M.A. 1799. In November 1793 he became a member, with Samuel Taylor Coleridge, Charles Valentine Le Grice, and Christopher Wordsworth, of a small literary society at Cambridge; and he seems to have been involved in the short-lived University Magazine of 1795.

While at Trinity, Rough made the acquaintance, as a fellow-sympathiser with William Frend, of John Singleton Copley. He was admitted at Gray's Inn on 9 February 1796, and called to the bar at the Inner Temple on 18 June 1801. He went the Midland circuit, and on 30 May 1808 became a serjeant-at-law.

Rough had constant money troubles, and for some years he was hindered by illness. In April 1816 he accepted Earl Bathurst's offer of the post of president of the court of justice for the united colony of Demerara and Essequibo. He remained there for five years, but on 6 October 1821, after a long disagreement, he was suspended by the acting governor, Lieutenant-general John Murray, for having, as supreme judge, usurped "the privileges and functions of the executive". He returned to England, and appealed to the Privy Council, which in April 1825 gave its decision in his favour.

After 1830, Rough was appointed a puisne judge in Ceylon. On 13 March 1836 he was promoted to be chief justice of the supreme court. Next year, on 7 August 1837, he was knighted. He died at Nuwara Eliya, Ceylon, on 19 May 1838.

== Works ==
Rough wrote:

- Lorenzino di Medici (a drama), and other poems, 1797; dedicated to William Roscoe.
- The Conspiracy of Gowrie, a tragedy (anon.), 1800.
- Lines on the Death of Sir Ralph Abercromby (anon.), 1800.

These pieces were collected in Poems, Miscellaneous and Fugitive, now first collected by the Author, on his preparing to leave England, 1816. Rough also edited, anonymously, Letters from the Year 1774 to the Year 1796, by John Wilkes, esq., addressed to his daughter, the late Miss Wilkes; with a collection of miscellaneous Poems; to which is prefixed a Memoir of the Life of Mr. Wilkes, London, 4 vols. 1804. He contributed poetry to the Gentleman's Magazine and the Monthly Magazine.

== Family ==
Rough married, on 26 June 1802, Harriet, aged 23, illegitimate daughter of John Wilkes. Henry Crabb Robinson met them socially in 1810; their circle included Frances Abington, Edmund Kean, Copley and many other lawyers. They had four children, but Harriet died in Demerara about 1820.

== Notes ==
Attribution

This article incorporates text from a publication now in the public domain: Lee, Sidney, ed. (1897). "Rough, William". Dictionary of National Biography. Vol. 49. London: Smith, Elder & Co.
