= Primary court =

Court of the judiciary of Sri Lanka

The primary courts in Sri Lanka is a lower court and are the courts of first instance. There are seven primary courts, located in Anamaduwa, Angunukolapelessa, Kandy, Mallakam, Pilessa, Wellawaya and Wennappuwa. In the other divisions, the magistrate's courts exercise the jurisdiction of the primary courts. The primary courts exercise both criminal and civil jurisdiction.
