= District court (Sri Lanka) =

Lower court of the judiciary of Sri Lanka

The district courts in Sri Lanka are lower courts headed by a district judge who is vested with original civil jurisdiction. In metropolitan areas such as Colombo there are multiple district courts in one location.

== Jurisdiction ==
Originally district judges were appointed to major cities and towns to hear civil cases, current district courts are established under the Judicature Act, No. 2 of 1978 to each judicial division in Sri Lanka. The minister in charge of the subject of justice in consultation with the chief justice and the president of the Court of Appeal would define the territorial limits of each judicial division. At present there are 54 judicial districts in Sri Lanka.

It has unlimited original jurisdiction of;

- Civil and commercial disputes
- Income and insolvency testamentary cases
- Family and marital disputes, including divorce and nullity of marriage
  - Guardianship of persons of unsound mind and their property
  - Testamentary cases of person deceased
  - Care of minors and their property

Jurisdiction of commercial disputes higher than Rs. 3 million in value and arising in the Western Province, is exercised by the High Court of Colombo. Appeals from judgments, decrees and orders of a district court lie to the Court of Appeal.

== Appointment and removal of district judges ==
All district judges are appointed by the Judicial Service Commission, which has power of dismissal and disciplinary control of the district judges. Additional district judges would be appointed to a district court.

== See also ==
- Supreme Court of Sri Lanka
- Constitution of Sri Lanka
