= Attorney General's Department (Sri Lanka) =

Sri Lankan government department

- නීතිපති දෙපාර්තමේන්තුව சட்டமா அதிபர் திணைக்களம்

Agency overview
- Formed: 1884
- Jurisdiction: The Democratic Socialist Republic of Sri Lanka
- Employees: 553
- Annual budget: LKR 1.28 billion (2016)
- Agency executives: Parinda Ranasinghe Jr., Attorney General; Viraj Dayaratne, Solicitor General
- Website: www.attorneygeneral.gov.lk

The Attorney General's Department is a non-ministerial government department in Sri Lanka that supports the attorney general and his/her deputy the solicitor general. The department is headed by the attorney general and comes under the purview of the Ministry of Justice. The office of "Attorney General" was formally adopted in the year 1884.

== Operational functions ==
Attorney General's Department provides legal assistance to the Central Government, Provincial Councils, Government Departments, Statutory Boards and other Semi Government institutions. Legal officers of the Department provide instructions to the Government and Governmental Institutions on Civil, Criminal, Constitutional and Commercial matters and represent the Government and Governmental Institutions for the Cases, instituted in the Supreme Court, other Courts and labor tribunals in the Island.

== Organisation ==
Three main Divisions named Civil Division, Criminal Division and State Attorney Division have been established in the Department for Civil and Criminal Cases and the Establishment Division & Account Division have been established to conduct administrative work. In addition to those divisions, Corporation Division, EER Unit, which performs duties under Extra Emergency Regulations and Prevention of Terrorism Act, Child Abuse Cases Unit, Immigration & Emigration Unit, Public Petitions Unit and Supreme Court Unit have been established for the smooth functioning of the Attorney General's Department.

=== Current attorney general ===
Parinda Ranasinghe was appointed Attorney General on 12 July 2024 by President Ranil Wickremesinghe. He previously served as Acting Attorney General from 1 July 2024.

Viraj Dayaratne was appointed Solicitor General on 28 November 2024 by President Anura Kumara Dissanayake.

== Organizational structure ==
Lawyers' of the Attorney General's Department are known as the Law Officers.

- Attorney General (AG)
- Solicitor General (SG)
- Senior Additional Solicitors General (SASG)
- Additional Solicitors General (ASG)
- Senior Deputy Solicitors General (SDSG)
- Deputy Solicitors General (DSG)
- Senior State Counsel
- State Counsel
- Assistant State Counsel
- Senior State Attorney
- State Attorney
- Senior Assistant State Attorney
- Assistant State Attorney

== Former posts ==
- Senior Crown Counsel – replaced by Senior State Counsel
- Crown Counsel – replaced by State Counsel
- Crown Proctor – replaced by State Attorney

== See also ==
- Attorney General of Sri Lanka
- Solicitor General of Sri Lanka
- Unofficial Bar

== External links and references ==
- Attorney General's Department
