= Supreme Court of Sri Lanka =

Highest court of jurisdiction in Sri Lanka

- ශ්‍රී ලංකා ශ්‍රේෂ්ඨාධිකරණය இலங்கை உயர் நீதிமன்றம்
- Seal of the Supreme Court
- Interactive map of Supreme Court of Sri Lanka
- 6.93542°N 79.86102°E
- Established: 1801
- Location: Hultsdorp, Colombo
- Coordinates: 6.93542°N 79.86102°E
- Motto: "Inspire public trust and confidence"
- Composition method: Presidential nomination with Constitutional Council confirmation
- Authorised by: Sri Lankan Constitution
- Judge term length: Until the age of 65 years
- Number of positions: 17
- Website: supremecourt.lk

Chief Justice of Sri Lanka
- Currently: Padman Surasena
- Since: 27 July 2025

The Supreme Court of Sri Lanka (Sinhala: ශ්‍රී ලංකා ශ්‍රේෂ්ඨාධිකරණය, romanized: Śrī Laṅkā Śreṣthādikaranaya; Tamil: இலங்கை உயர் நீதிமன்றம், romanized: Ilaṇkai uyar nītimaṉṟam) is the highest court in Sri Lanka and the final judicial instance of record. Established in 1801 and empowered to exercise its powers subject to the provisions of the Constitution of Sri Lanka, the Supreme Court has ultimate appellate jurisdiction in constitutional matters and takes precedence over all lower courts. The Sri Lankan judicial system is a complex blend of common law and civil law. In some cases, such as those involving capital punishment, the decision may be passed on to the President of Sri Lanka for clemency petitions. The current Chief Justice of Sri Lanka is Padman Surasena.

== History ==
The Supreme Court of Sri Lanka was created on 18 April 1801 with the "Royal Charter of Justice of 1801 of King George the 3rd establishing the Supreme Courts of the Island of Ceylon" by the British, who controlled most of the island at the time, excluding the inland territory of Kandy. This creation was repealed in 1833 and replaced by a new Charter covering the whole of the island. In 1948, the country gained its independence as the Dominion of Ceylon and adopted a new Constitution in 1972 after becoming a republic.

Until 1971, there was a right of appeal from the Supreme Court of Ceylon to the Judicial Committee of the Privy Council in London, which was terminated under the terms of the Court of Appeal Act No. 44 1971

A fire occurred at the building it was housed in on 15 December 2020 that was later doused by firefighters.

== Composition ==
=== Size of the court ===
The Supreme Court consists of the chief justice and not fewer than six and not more than sixteen other judges, as stipulated in Article 119 of the Constitution of Sri Lanka. The court was expanded to its current size on 29 October 2020 through the Twentieth Amendment to the Constitution. Previously, it comprised the chief justice and a maximum of ten other judges.

=== Appointment and confirmation ===
The President of Sri Lanka is responsible for the appointment and removal of all the judges of the Supreme Court. The Supreme Court judges are appointed with the advice and consent of the Constitutional Council. From 3 October 2001 until 2011, with the 17th Amendment, the Constitutional Council had the task of advising the President on the appointment of judges. If the appointment is for a period less than fourteen days, this requirement will not apply. The Justices are not allowed to hold any other office without the consent of the Constitution or the President.

In the discharge of its functions relating to the appointment of judges of the Courts, the Council may obtain the views of the Chief Justice and of the Attorney General.

=== Tenure ===
Judges who hold office during good behaviour can serve until the retirement age for judges fixed at 65 years, as per the Constitution. They cannot be removed except by an order of the President made after an address to the Parliament and the support of the majority of its members. The order has to be presented to the President for removal on the ground of proven misbehaviour or incapacity.

A resolution for the presentation of the order of the President can be obtained by the Speaker or be placed on the Order Paper of Parliament only if notice of the resolution is signed by no less than one-third of the total number of Members of Parliament and sets out full particulars of the alleged misbehaviour or incapacity. Parliament is required to provide for all matters relating to the presentation of the address, including the procedure for the passing of the resolution, the investigation and proof of the alleged misbehaviour or incapacity, and the right of the judge to appear and to be heard in person or by a representative, by law or by Standing Orders of Parliament.

A judge is not permitted to perform or hold any other office, whether paid or not or accept any place of profit or emolument, except as authorized by the Constitution or by written law or with the written consent of the President.

=== Removal ===
A judge of the Supreme Court can only be removed by Parliament, however, if convicted of a criminal offence the judge may face a jail sentence. The 2015 indictment of Justice Sarath de Abrew was the first sitting Supreme Court judge being indicted on a criminal offence.

== Justices of the Supreme Court ==
Below is a list of justices currently serving on the Supreme Court.

As of 11 June 2026

Chief justice of Sri Lanka

Current Justices of the Supreme Court
| No. | Justice | Appointed by | Start date / length of service | Current status | Ref. |
|---|---|---|---|---|---|
| – | Padman Surasena | Sirisena | 9 January 2019 – 27 July 2025; 6 years, 199 days | 49th Chief Justice of Sri Lanka; Appointed by: Dissanayake; 27 July 2025; 1 year, 61 days | |
| 1 | Yasantha Kodagoda | G. Rajapaksa | 3 February 2020; 6 years, 235 days | Puisne justice | |
| 2 | Dilip Nawaz | G. Rajapaksa | 1 December 2020; 5 years, 299 days | Puisne justice | |
| 3 | Shiran Gooneratne | G. Rajapaksa | 1 December 2020; 5 years, 299 days | Puisne justice | |
| 4 | Janak de Silva | G. Rajapaksa | 1 December 2020; 5 years, 299 days | Puisne justice | |
| 5 | Achala Wengappuli | G. Rajapaksa | 1 December 2020; 5 years, 299 days | Puisne justice | |
| 6 | Mahinda Samayawardhena | G. Rajapaksa | 1 December 2020; 5 years, 299 days | Puisne justice | |
| 7 | Arjuna Obeyesekere | G. Rajapaksa | 14 June 2021; 5 years, 104 days | Puisne justice | |
| 8 | Sobhitha Rajakaruna | Dissanayake | 12 January 2025; 1 year, 257 days | Puisne justice | |
| 9 | Menaka Wijesundara | Dissanayake | 12 January 2025; 1 year, 257 days | Puisne justice | |
| 10 | Sampath B. Abeykoon | Dissanayake | 12 January 2025; 1 year, 257 days | Puisne justice | |
| 11 | Sampath Wijeratne | Dissanayake | 12 January 2025; 1 year, 257 days | Puisne justice | |
| 12 | Gihan Kulatunga | Dissanayake | 10 December 2025; 290 days | Puisne justice | |
| 13 | Vacant | | | Puisne justice | |
| 14 | Vacant | | | Puisne justice | |
| 15 | Vacant | | | Puisne justice | |
| 16 | Vacant | | | Puisne justice | |

== Facilities ==
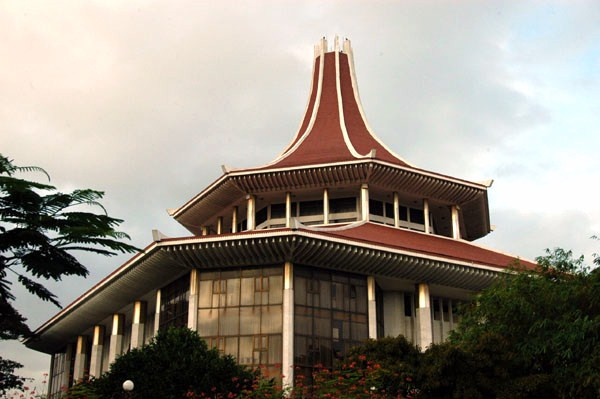
The Supreme Court Complex

The Supreme Court of Sri Lanka is housed in the Hulftsdorp court complex.

=== Supreme Court Complex Fire ===
On 15 December 2020 at 4:45 pm a fire started in the waste material storage area on the ground floor of the Supreme Court Complex. Several fire trucks were dispatched to douse the fire. The incident prompted a police investigation. The fire only destroyed defective material, according to Police Media. No one was injured and there was no damage to any other building in the Supreme Court area.

== Procedure ==
=== Jurisdiction ===
Article 118 of the Constitution - the Supreme Court is the highest and final superior court of record and is empowered to exercise original advisory and appellate judicial functions. It is also the final Court of Record and the Court of Appeal of Sri Lanka. The Supreme Court has the following powers, subject to the provisions of the Constitution:

- Jurisdiction in respect of Constitutional matters (Articles 120 to 125)
- Jurisdiction for the protection of fundamental rights (Article 126)
- Final appellate jurisdiction (Article 127, 128)
- Consultative jurisdiction (Article 129)
- Jurisdiction in petitions relating to the election of President; petitions relating to the validity of a referendum; appeals from Orders/judgments of the Court of Appeal in other election petitions – Article 130 (as amended by the 14th Amendment)
- Jurisdiction in respect of any breach of the privileges of Parliament (Article 132);
- Jurisdiction in respect of other matters which Parliament may by law vest or ordain

Appeals from judgments, sentences and orders pronounced at a High Court Trial at Bar lie direct to the Supreme Court.

=== Independence ===
Sri Lankan judiciary was considered non-independent by some analysts during the time of President Mahinda Rajapaksa. It was proved right by the Impeachment of Shirani Bandaranayake. Shirani Bandaranayake the former chief justice was impeached by the parliament for rulings against the government, including one against a bill proposed by Basil Rajapaksa the minister for economic development and the brother of the president Mahinda Rajapaksa. Bandaranayake was replaced as chief justice by former Attorney General Mohan Peiris. Peiris is considered to be an ally of former president Rajapaksa and his appointment is seen by critics as further consolidation of power by the president and his family. Bandaranayake had refused to recognise the impeachment and lawyers groups had refused to work with the new chief justice. Bandaranayake's controversial impeachment has drawn much criticism and concern from within and outside of Sri Lanka.

After Maithripala Sirisena was elected as president the appointment of Mohan Peiris was considered null and void in law because Bandaranayake's sacking by the previous Government had no legal validity. Shirani Bandaranayake resumed office carrying a bouquet of flowers and being greeted by lawyers. After that, she lawfully retired and Kanagasabapathy Sripavan was appointed as the Chief justice

=== Landmark judgments ===
In one of the landmark judgements, the Supreme Court ruled that powers over land would continue to remain vested in the Central Government, and not the provincial councils.

The verdict assumes significance in the wake of the government's apparent reluctance to devolve land and police powers — stated in the 13th Amendment that followed the Indo-Lanka Accord of 1987 — to its provinces. It practically killed the 13th amendment.

== Dress ==
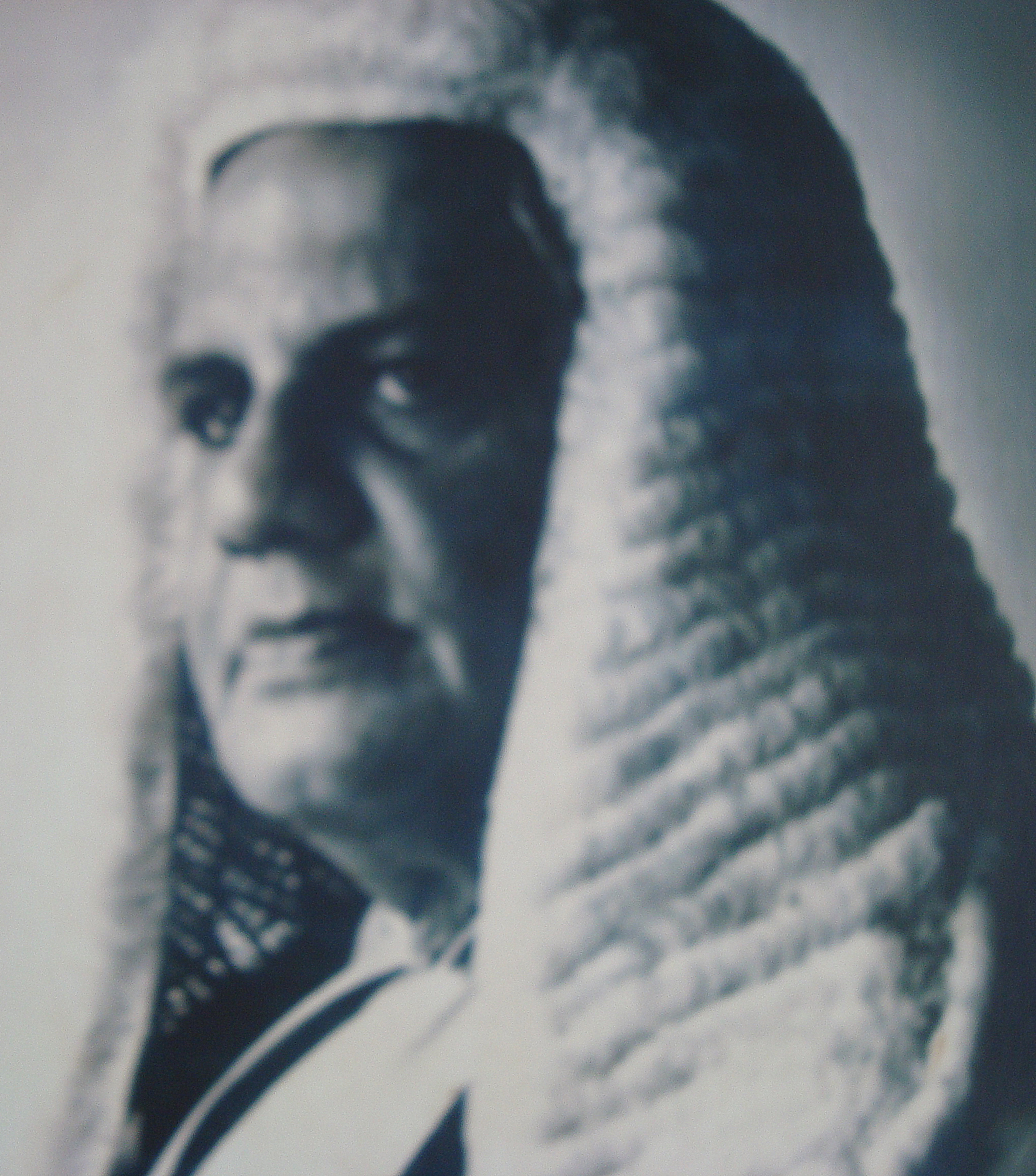
Justice Manicavasagar in long wig and court dress

Supreme Court judges wear scarlet gowns when attending court. On special ceremonial occasions (such as ceremonial sittings of the Supreme Court) they would wear a scarlet gown, barrister's bands and mantle and a long wig.

== See also ==
- High Court of Sri Lanka
