= Sri Lanka Armed Forces =

Combined military forces of Sri Lanka

- Service branches: Sri Lanka Army; Sri Lanka Navy; Sri Lanka Air Force
- Headquarters: Colombo

Leadership
- Supreme Commander: Anura Kumara Dissanayake
- Minister of Defence: President Anura Kumara Dissanayake
- Secretary of Defence: Air vice-marshal Sampath Thuyacontha (Retd)

Personnel
- Military age: 18 years of age
- Conscription: None
- Active personnel: 262,500 (ranked 20th)
- Reserve personnel: 6,000
- Deployed personnel: 18,000 (UN peace keeping)

Expenditure
- Budget: රු.442 billion / US$ 1.5 billion (2025)
- Percent of GDP: 1.93% (2020)

Industry
- Domestic suppliers: SLEME; Colombo Dockyard
- Foreign suppliers: India; China; European Union; Russia; Pakistan; Israel; United States; United Kingdom
- Annual exports: India; Maldives; Nigeria

Related articles
- History: World War I World War II; First JVP Insurrection; Second JVP Insurrection; Sri Lankan Civil War: Eelam War I; Eelam War II; Eelam War III; Eelam War IV
- Ranks: Army; Navy; Air Force

The Sri Lanka Armed Forces is the overall unified military of the Democratic Socialist Republic of Sri Lanka encompassing the Sri Lanka Army, the Sri Lanka Navy, and the Sri Lanka Air Force; they are governed by the Ministry of Defence (MoD). The three services have around 263,000 active personnel; conscription has never been imposed in Sri Lanka.

== History ==
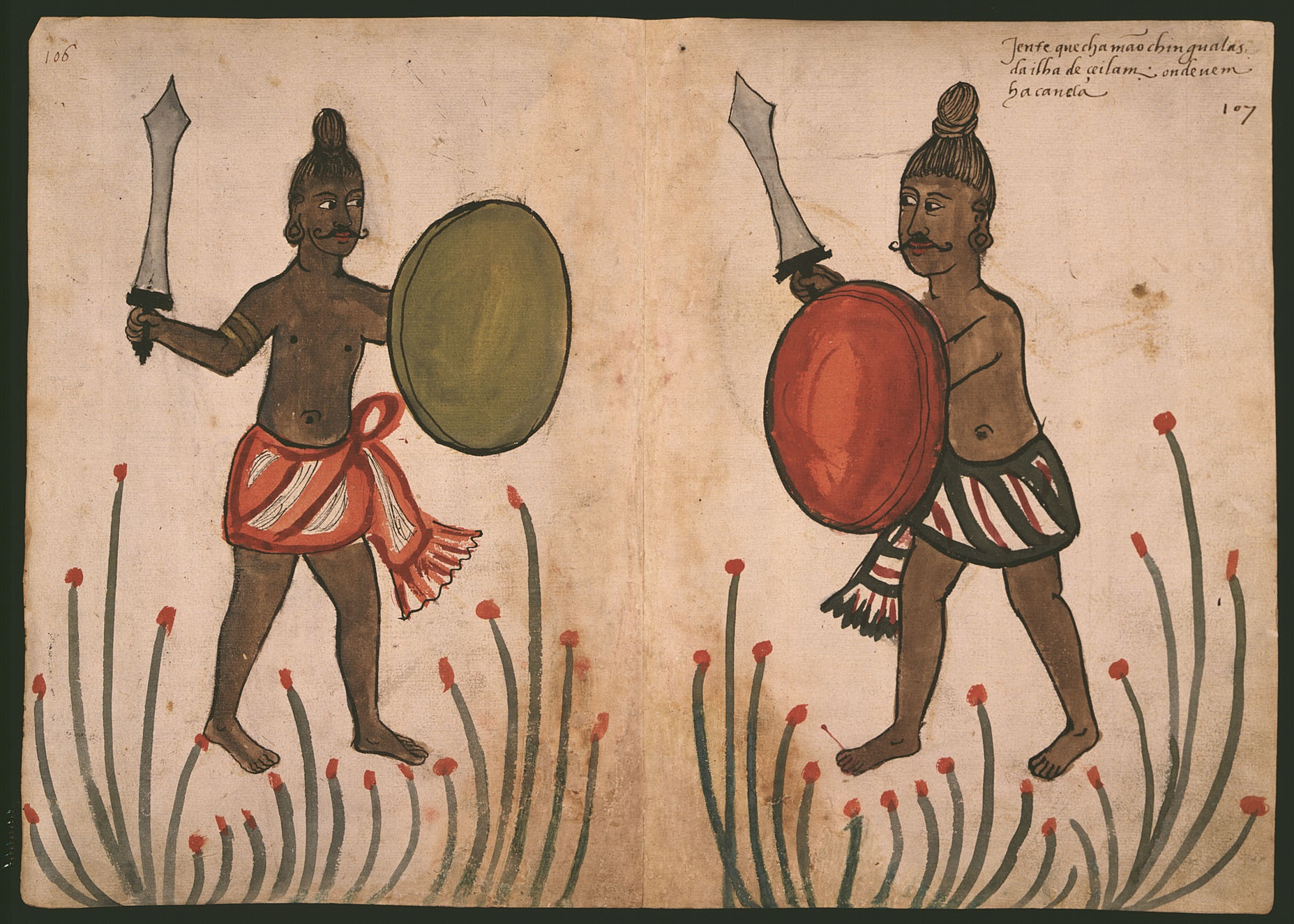
Sinhala warriors of the 16th century, from a contemporary Portuguese codex

Sri Lanka has a military history going back to more than 2000 years. The roots of the modern Sri Lankan military lead back to the colonial era when the Portuguese, Dutch and British established local militias to support their wars against the local Kingdoms. The British created the Ceylon Rifle Regiment during the Kandyan wars. Although it had natives in its ranks, it was largely composed of Malays. It was disbanded in 1873.

=== Imperial service ===
The lineage of the Sri Lanka Armed Forces dates back to 1881, when the British created a volunteer reserve on the island named the Ceylon Light Infantry Volunteers. Created to supplement the British garrison in Ceylon in the event of an external threat, it gradually increased in size. In 1910 it was renamed the Ceylon Defence Force (CDF) and consisted of several regiments. The CDF mobilised for home defence in World War I and again in World War II when its units were deployed along with allied forces in Asia and Africa. At the end of the war it had grown in size to that of an independent brigade, but was demobilised in 1946 and disbanded in 1949. In 1937 the Ceylon Naval Volunteer Force was established (later renamed as the Ceylon Royal Naval Volunteer Reserve (CRNVR)), it was mobilised for World War II in 1939 and was incorporated into the Royal Navy.

=== Dominion of Ceylon ===
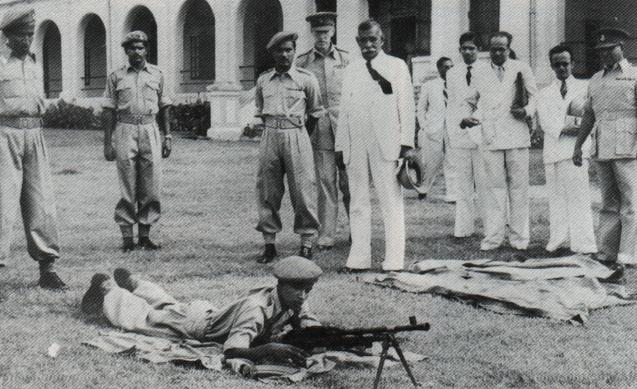
Prime Minister D. S. Senanayake watching the Ceylon Light Infantry training.

Following the establishment of the Dominion of Ceylon with Britain granting independence in 1948, work began to establish a regular military. The Army Act No. 17 of 1949 was passed by Parliament on 11 April 1949 and formalised in the Gazette Extraordinary No. 10028 of 10 October 1949. This marked the creation of the Ceylon Army, and the CDF and the CRNVR were disbanded to make way for a regular navy. On 9 December 1950 the Royal Ceylon Navy (RCyN) was established. Finally, in 1951 the Royal Ceylon Air Force (RCyAF) was established as the youngest of the three forces. From the outset Britain played a significant role in helping the Ceylon government in developing its armed forces.

The growth of the Ceylon Armed Forces was slow due to lack of foreign threat, since Ceylon maintained cordial relations with its neighbour India and had a defence treaty with Britain. In the 1950s it was mainly employed in internal security assisting the police. There was an attempted coup in 1962 by a group of reservists, which led to cuts in military spending and the disbandment of several regiments. This, together with the lack of an intelligence agency, left it ill-prepared for the insurgency launched by the Marxist JVP in April 1971.

=== First JVP Insurrection ===
The 1971 JVP Insurrection saw Ceylon Armed Forces mobilising for combat operations for the first time. The state's military grew rapidly and the insurrection was brought under control in a few months.

=== Republic of Sri Lanka ===
In 1972, Ceylon became the independent socialist Republic of Sri Lanka; thereupon, the Ceylon Armed Forces changed its name to Sri Lanka Armed Forces: the Ceylon Army became the Sri Lanka Army, the Royal Ceylon Navy became the Sri Lanka Navy, and the Royal Ceylon Air Force became the Sri Lanka Air Force.

=== Sri Lankan Civil War and the Second JVP Insurrection ===
By the early 1980s, the Sri Lanka Armed Forces mobilised against the insurgency of Tamil militant groups in the north of the island. This was the beginning of the Sri Lankan Civil War. The size of the Armed Forces grew rapidly in the 1980s. By the mid-1980s, the Armed Forces began launching operations in the like of conventional warfare against the Liberation Tigers of Tamil Eelam (LTTE) which had by then became the most powerful of the Tamil militant groups and had been proscribed as a terrorist organisation by the Sri Lanka.

This led to India intervening by entering Sri Lankan air space to carry out food drops. Shortly afterward the Indo-Sri Lankan Accord was signed and the Indian Peace Keeping Force (IPKF) was sent to Sri Lanka to establish peace.

The military was redistricted to its bases but was soon involved in another insurrection by the JVP in the south of the island from 1987 to 1989. In the north, tension increased with the LTTE and the IPKF leading to open war with the two suffering heavy casualties. In 1990 the IPKF pulled out and the war commenced with the Sri Lanka Armed Forces and the LTTE.

In 1994, a brief ceasefire came into place and peace talks began. The ceasefire ended when the LTTE sack two SLN gunboats. The phase of the war that followed, known as Eelam War III, saw a conventional war taking place in the northern and eastern provinces of the island and LTTE attacks in other parts of the country, which included several largescale suicide bombings. The Sri Lankan Army began deploying full divisions in offensive operations and the Navy and Air Force increased their inventories to support the Army.

In 2002, a new Cease-Fire Agreement (CFA) was established with Norwegian mediation and peace talks began. The Sri Lanka Monitoring Mission (SLMM) was established to monitor the ceasefire and certain progress archived until the LTTE withdrew from the peace talks in 2003. Although the ceasefire continued no peace talks took place till 2005. In 2006, the SLMM reported that the LTTE had violated the CFA 3,471 times and the Sri Lankan security forces 162 times since the signing of the ceasefire.

Some defence reforms also commenced in 2002 when the Prime Minister established the Defence Review Committee (DRC) which formulated extensive recommendations that encapsulate force modernisation as well as the restructuring of command and control in ways that would make the army more responsive to civil control. The first task of the Committee was to assess the Higher Defence Organisation, given the decision by the President to relinquish the defence portfolio. When a paper drafted by the Committee was inadvertently made public, concerns were raised that the Committee's recommendations for restructuring Higher Defence Organisation might be constitutionally flawed in relation to the role of the President as Commander-in-Chief of the Sri Lankan armed forces. Although the work of the Committee thereafter proceeded apace, the DRC itself became a political football amidst the growing tension between the President and the Prime Minister. In 2003 the President took the decision to bring an end to the work of the DRC and, instead, assigned the task of SSR to the Joint Operations Headquarters, since when little progress has been evident.

In April 2006 following a suicide bomb attack on the Commander of the Army, airstrikes began followed by skirmishes, however, both the government and the LTTE claimed that the ceasefire was still in place. The offensive by the Armed Forces was launched when the LTTE closed the sluice gates of the Mavil Aru reservoir on 21 July and cut the water supply to 15,000 villages in government controlled areas. This led to several major attacks by the LTTE in the eastern province and the north. The Armed Forces went on the offensive successfully recapturing LTTE control areas in the eastern province during 2007. By then the LTTE had been proscribed as a terrorist organisation by 32 countries.

In 2017 Sri Lanka Armed Forces deployed nearly 10,000 personnel and equipment for relief, help and rescue operations of 2017 Sri Lanka floods. This is the biggest military deployment of the peacetime.

On 3 January 2008 the government informed Norway of its decision to quit the ceasefire, with it the ceasefire officially ended on 16 January 2008, following several bombings in the capital. Along with the ceasefire operations of the SLMM also ended.

During 2008 there was heavy fighting in the northern province where the Sri Lanka Armed Forces launched major offensives and succeeded in recapturing LTTE controlled areas of the Mannar District, the Vavuniya District and moving into the Mullaitivu District and Kilinochchi District. During December 2008, the Sri Lankan Armed Forces were engaged in offensives on all fronts, with heavy fighting around Kilinochchi (where the LTTE had its headquarters) and close to Mullaitivu.

In early 2009 the Armed Forces recaptured in quick succession Kilinochchi and the strategically important Elephant Pass. Thus establishing a land route to the government controlled Jaffna Peninsula which had been supplied by sea and air for over 10 years after its recapture in 1995. Shortly thereafter Mullaitivu was recaptured by the 59th Division of the SLA. Boxed into a small land area north of Mullaitivu, the LTTE with its remaining cadres and leadership was effectively trapped, with this land mass being slowly reduced until May 2009.

On 19 May 2009, the Sri Lanka Armed Forces won its final battle against the LTTE with the death of several LTTE leaders, including its head Velupillai Prabhakaran while he was attempting to flee.

On 22 May 2009, Sri Lankan Defence Secretary Gotabhaya Rajapaksa confirmed that 6,261 personnel of the Sri Lankan Armed Forces had lost their lives and 29,551 were wounded during Eelam War IV since July 2006.

The Armed Forces along with the LTTE have been accused of committing war crimes during the war, particularly during the final stages. A panel of experts appointed by UN Secretary-General Ban Ki-moon to advise him on the issue of accountability with regard to any alleged violations of international human rights and humanitarian law during the final stages of the civil war found "credible allegations" which, if proven, indicated that war crimes and crimes against humanity were committed by the Sri Lankan Armed Forces and the LTTE, with most civilian casualties in the final phases of the war being blamed on indiscriminate Sri Lankan Army shelling and the LTTE being blamed for using civilians as a human buffer. The Office of the United Nations High Commissioner for Human Rights accused the Sri Lankan Armed Forces of committing widespread and often extremely brutal sexual violence against both Tamil females and males alike in a report in 2015.

=== Major operations of Sri Lanka armed forces ===
- 1971 JVP insurrection
- 1987–89 JVP insurrection
- Vadamarachchi Operation
- Operation Balavegaya
- Operation Riviresa
- 2008 SLA Northern offensive

== Funding ==
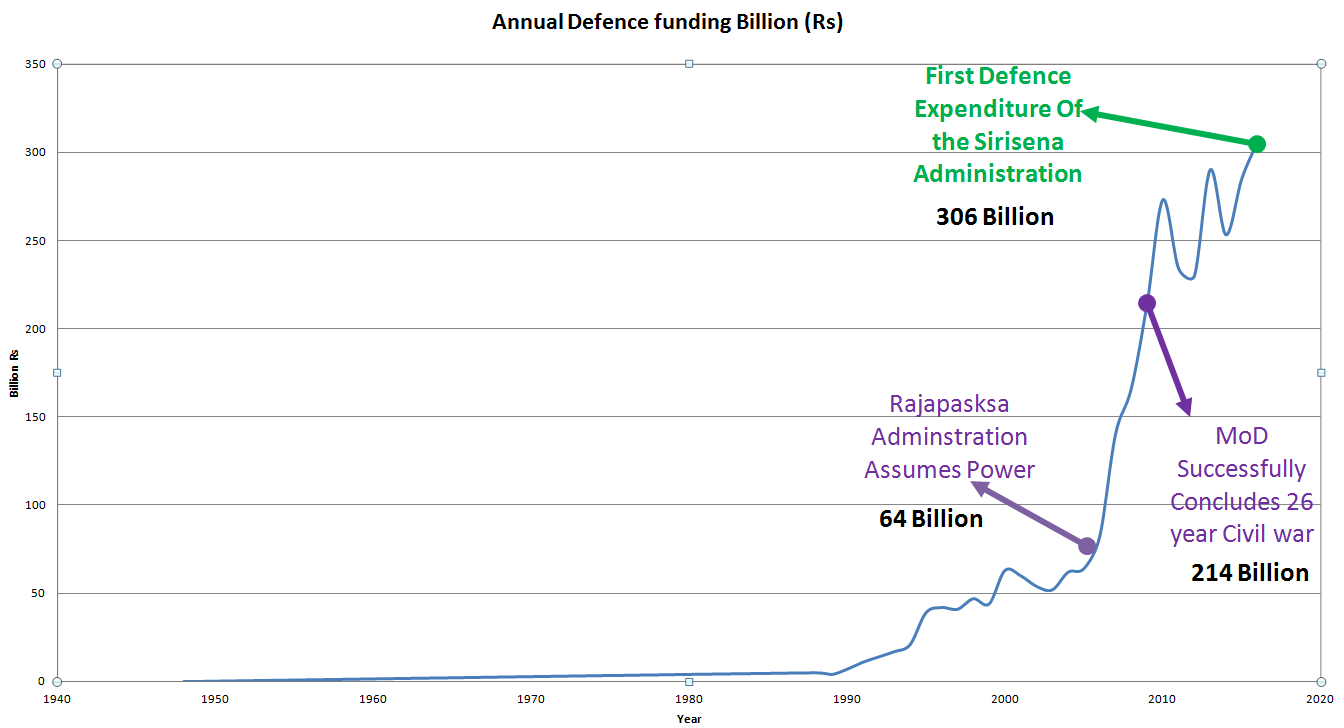
2016 Sri Lanka Defence Budget

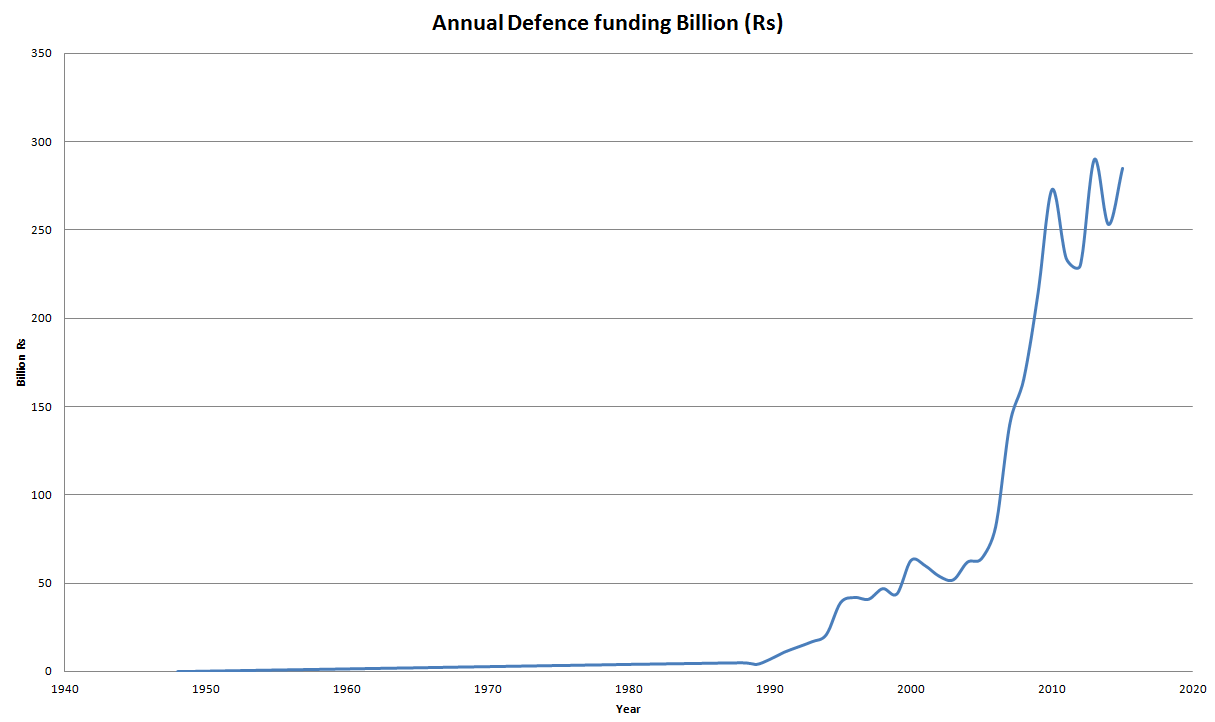
2014 Defence Budget graph

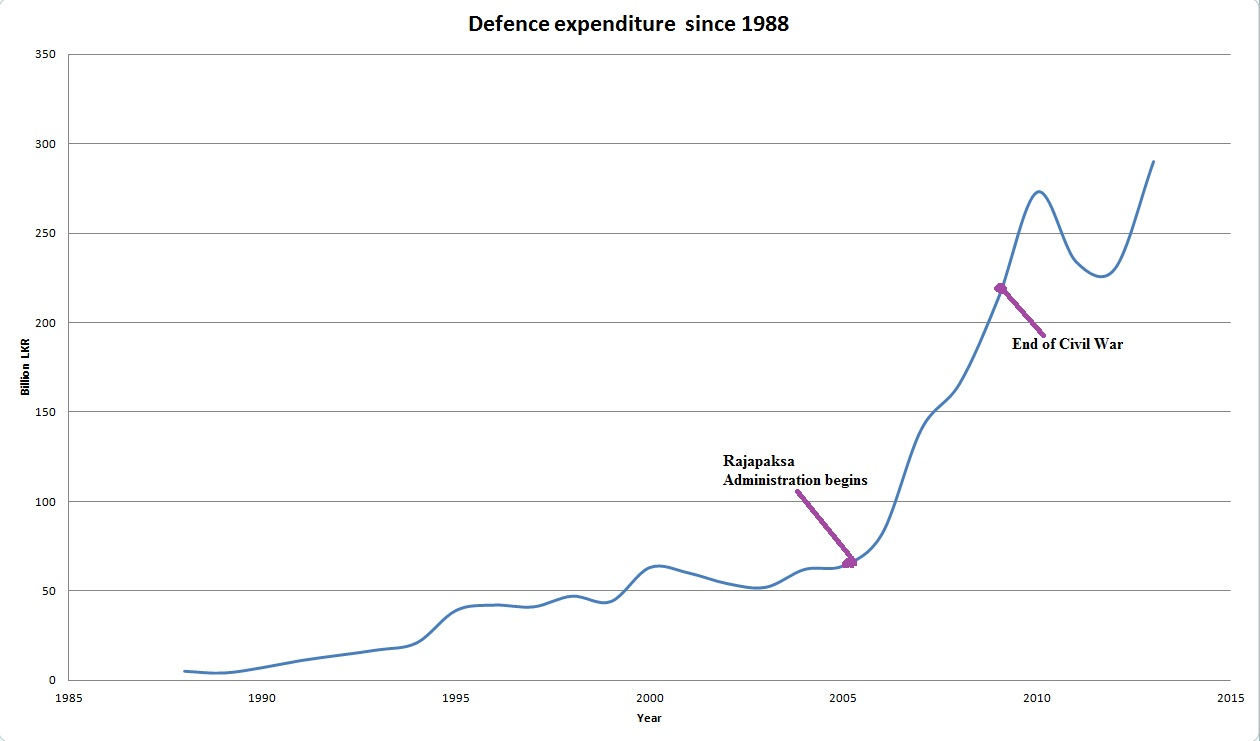
Defence Annual Expenditure since 1988

| Year | Appropriated endowment (Billion) Rs | Supplementary funding (Billion) Rs | Cumulative expenditure (Billion) Rs |
|---|---|---|---|
| 1948 | - | - | |
| 1988 | 5 | - | 5 |
| 1989 | 4 | - | 9 |
| 1990 | 7 | - | 16 |
| 1991 | 11 | - | 27 |
| 1992 | 14 | - | 41 |
| 1993 | 17 | - | 58 |
| 1994 | 21 | - | 79 |
| 1995 | 39 | - | 118 |
| 1996 | 42 | - | 160 |
| 1997 | 41 | - | 201 |
| 1998 | 47 | - | 248 |
| 1999 | 44 | - | 292 |
| 2000 | 63 | - | 355 |
| 2001 | 60 | - | 415 |
| 2002 | 54 | - | 469 |
| 2003 | 52 | - | 521 |
| 2004 | 62 | - | 583 |
| 2005 | 64 | - | 647 |
| 2006 | 82 | - | 729 |
| 2007 | 140 | - | 869 |
| 2008 | 166 | - | 1035 |
| 2009 | 175 | 39 | 1249 |
| 2010 | 273 | None | 1552 |
| 2011 | 214 | 20 | 1756 |
| 2012 | 230 | None | 1986 |
| 2013 | 290 | None | 2276 |
| 2014 | 253 | None | 2529 |
| 2015 | 285 | None | 2814 |
| 2016 | 307 | None | 3121 |
| 2017 | 284 | None | 3405 |
| 2018 | 290 | None | 3695 |
| 2019 | 392 | None | 4087 |

== Strategic importance ==
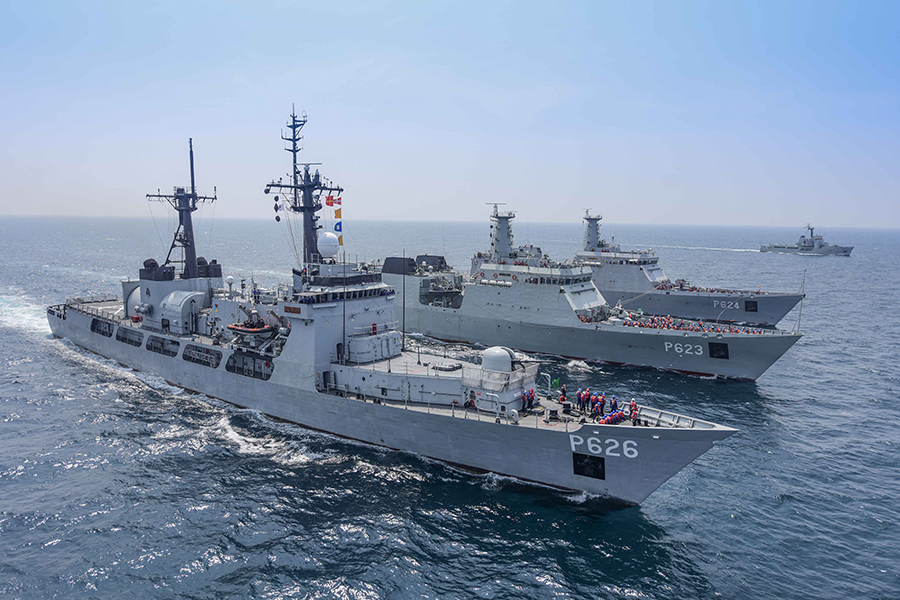
Sri Lanka Navy SLNS Gajabahu (P626), SLNS Sayurala (P623) and SLNS Sindurala (P624) during 2022 Colombo Naval Exercise. SLNS Samudura (P261) also visible in the distance.

The posture of the military has been defensive due to the nature of the strategic threats to Sri Lanka. In the short-term, internal security is considered the main threat to the nation's future. In the long-term, the threat is seen as primarily external from current and future superpowers in their rival quests for dominance of the Indian Ocean; at one point these were the United States of America and the Soviet Union.

== Command organisation ==
As head of state, the President of Sri Lanka, is nominally the Commander-in-Chief of the Armed Forces. The National Security Council, chaired by the President is the authority charged with formulating and executing defence policy for the nation. The highest level of military headquarters is the Ministry of Defence, since 1978 except for a few rare occasions the President retained the portfolio defence, thus being the Minister of Defence. The ministry and the armed forces have been controlled during these periods by either a Minister of State, Deputy Minister for defence, and recently by the Permanent Secretary to the Ministry of Defence. Prior to 1978 the Prime Minister held the portfolio of Minister of Defence and External Affairs, and was supported by a Parliamentary Secretary for Defence and External Affairs.

The Ministry of Defence is responsible for the management of the forces. Until 2025, the planning and execution of combined operations was headed by the Chief of the Defence Staff. The three services have their own respective professional chiefs: the Commander of the Army, the Commander of the Navy and the Commander of the Air Force.

== Deployments in peacekeeping missions ==
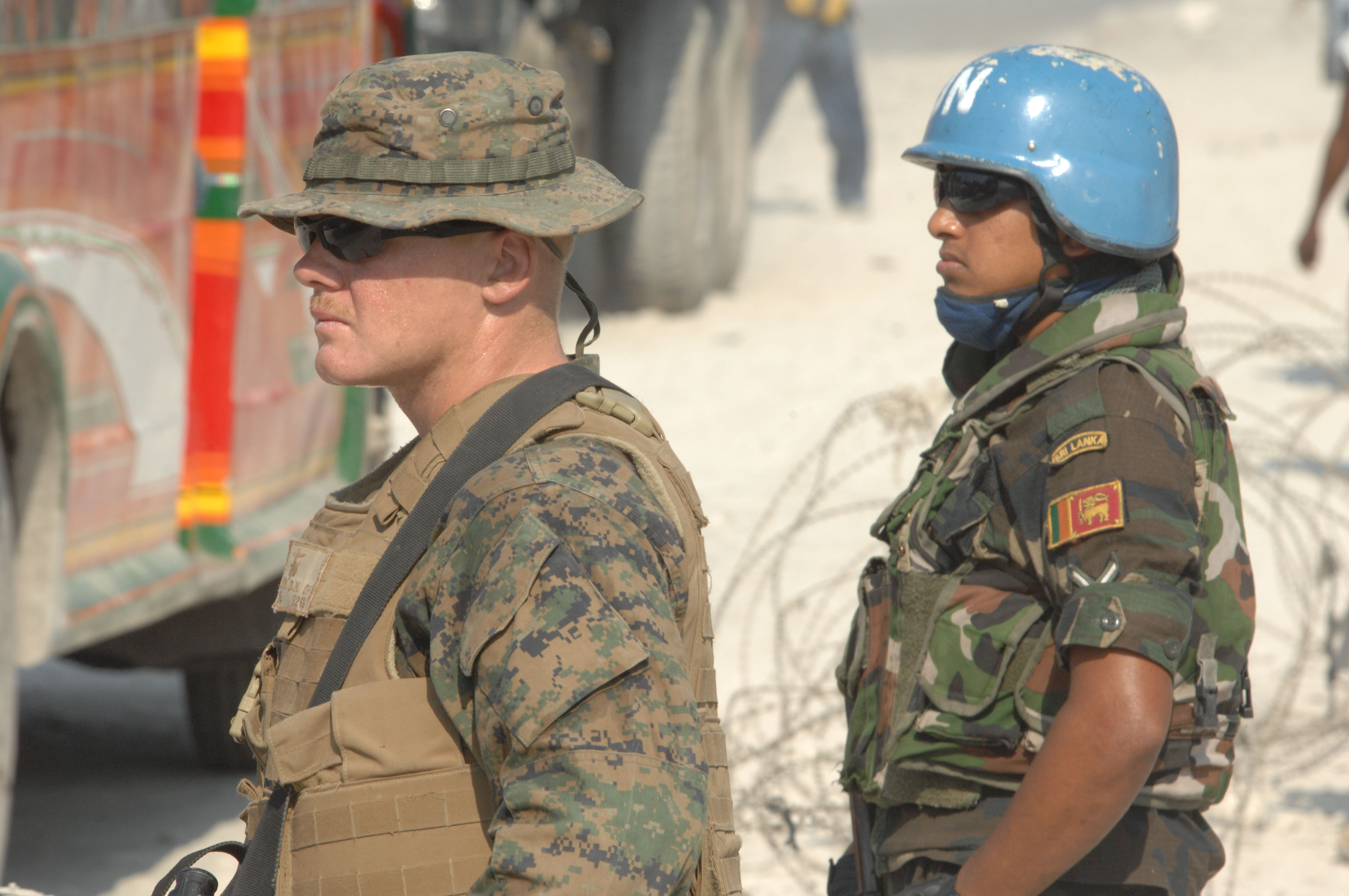
Sri Lanka Army Peacekeeper with the US Marine Corps

Ceylon's first involvement in United Nations peacekeeping took place in 1957 in the wake of the Suez Crisis as the United Nations General Assembly moved to form an Advisory Committee to plan the deployment of what was going to be the United Nations Emergency Force. Ceylon was a member of the Advisory Committee and offered a peacekeeping contingent.

First peacekeeping deployment of the island's armed forces took place in 1960, when Ceylon held the Commonwealth Seat as a Non-permanent member of the United Nations Security Council. Six peacekeepers were dispatch to the United Nations Operation in the Congo which was the first major peacekeeping operation undertaken by the United Nations. This was followed by a second contingent in 1961.

The Sri Lanka restarted contributing to UN peacekeeping missions with the deployment of an infantry battalion for the United Nations Stabilisation Mission in Haiti (MINUSTAH) in 2004, deploying over 16,292 personal between 2004 and 2017. Sri Lankan peacekeepers have been embroiled in a child sex ring scandal in Haiti, with at least 134 soldiers being accused of sexually abusing nine children from 2004 to 2007.

MINUSTAH was followed by deployments of a mechanised infantry company in the United Nations Interim Force in Lebanon (UNIFIL); field hospital and helicopter flight in the United Nations Mission in South Sudan (UNMISS); a combat convoy company in the United Nations Multidimensional Integrated Stabilization Mission in Mali (MINUSMA); a helicopter flight in the United Nations Mission in the Central African Republic (MINURCA); and military observers for the United Nations Mission for the Referendum in Western Sahara (MINURSO). Sri Lanka has sent staff officers to serve in the UN Headquarters in New York. The Institute of Peacekeeping Support Operations Training Sri Lanka (IPSOTSL) was established to train UN peacekeepers in Sri Lanka.

Foreign deployment of Armed Forces Personnel (2019)
| Country | Army | Navy | Air Force |
|---|---|---|---|
| Lebanon (UNIFIL) | 149 | - | - |
| DR Congo (MONUSCO) | 4 | - | - |
| Mali (MINUSMA) | 203 | - | - |
| Abyei (UNISFA) | 6 | - | - |
| South Sudan (UNMISS) | 71 | - | 102 |
| Central African Republic (MINUSCA) | 7 | - | 109 |
| Western Sahara (MINURSO) | 4 | - | - |
| New York Mission | 3 | - | - |
| Total | 443 | 0 | 211 |

== Army ==
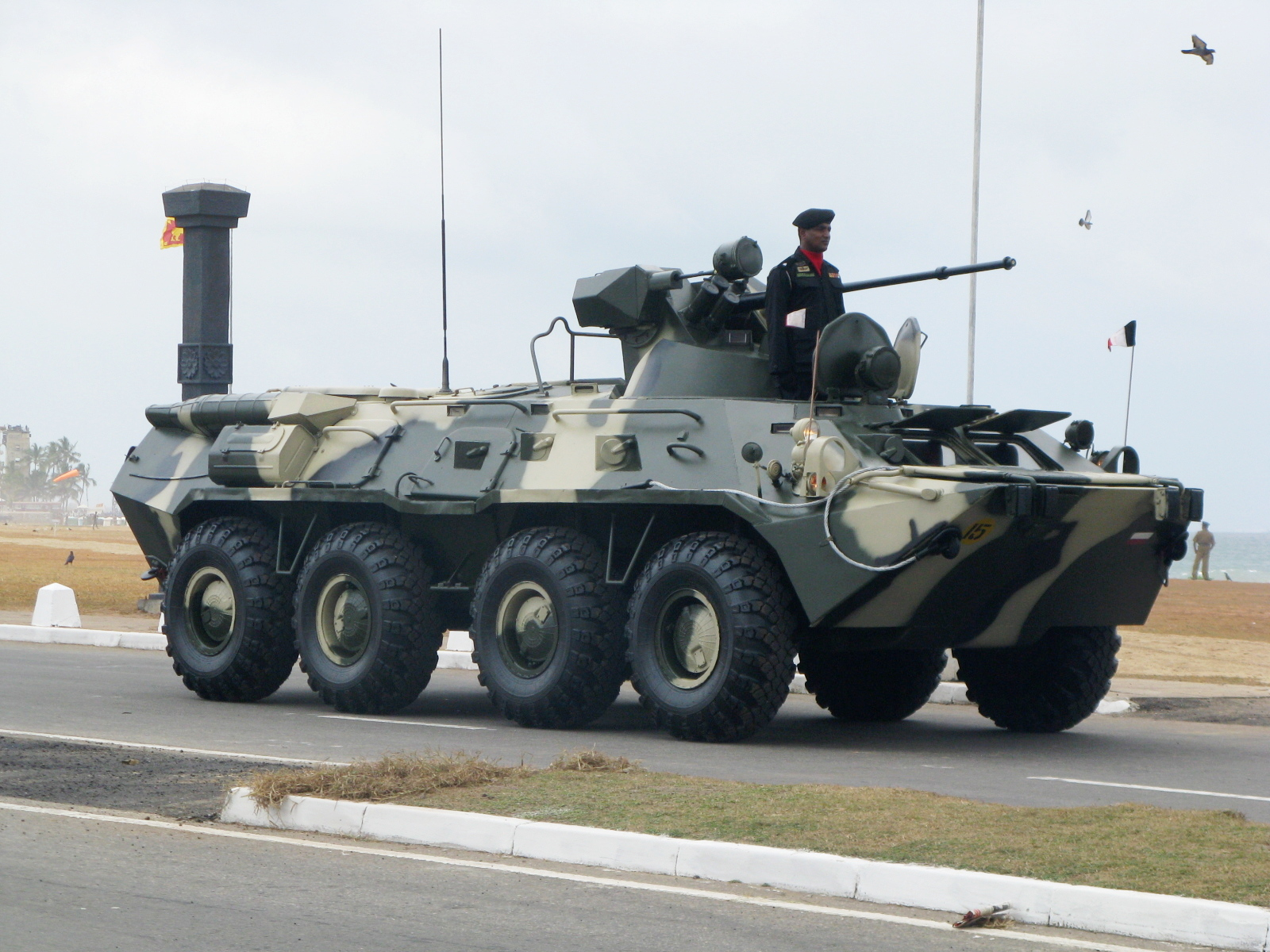
BTR-80 Armoured Personnel Carrier - Sri Lanka Army

The Sri Lanka Army is the oldest and largest of Sri Lanka's three armed services. Established as the Royal Ceylon Army in 1949, it was renamed when Sri Lanka became a republic in 1972. The Army of approximately 177,000 consisting of 113,000 active members as well 64,00 reservists of the National Guard and is responsible for overseeing land-based military and humanitarian operations.

At present the army has deployed 12 divisions and forming 4 more in while carrying out combat operations. Since 2004 the Sri Lankan Army maintains a battalion and support units of around 1000 personnel in the United Nations peacekeeping operations.

== Navy ==
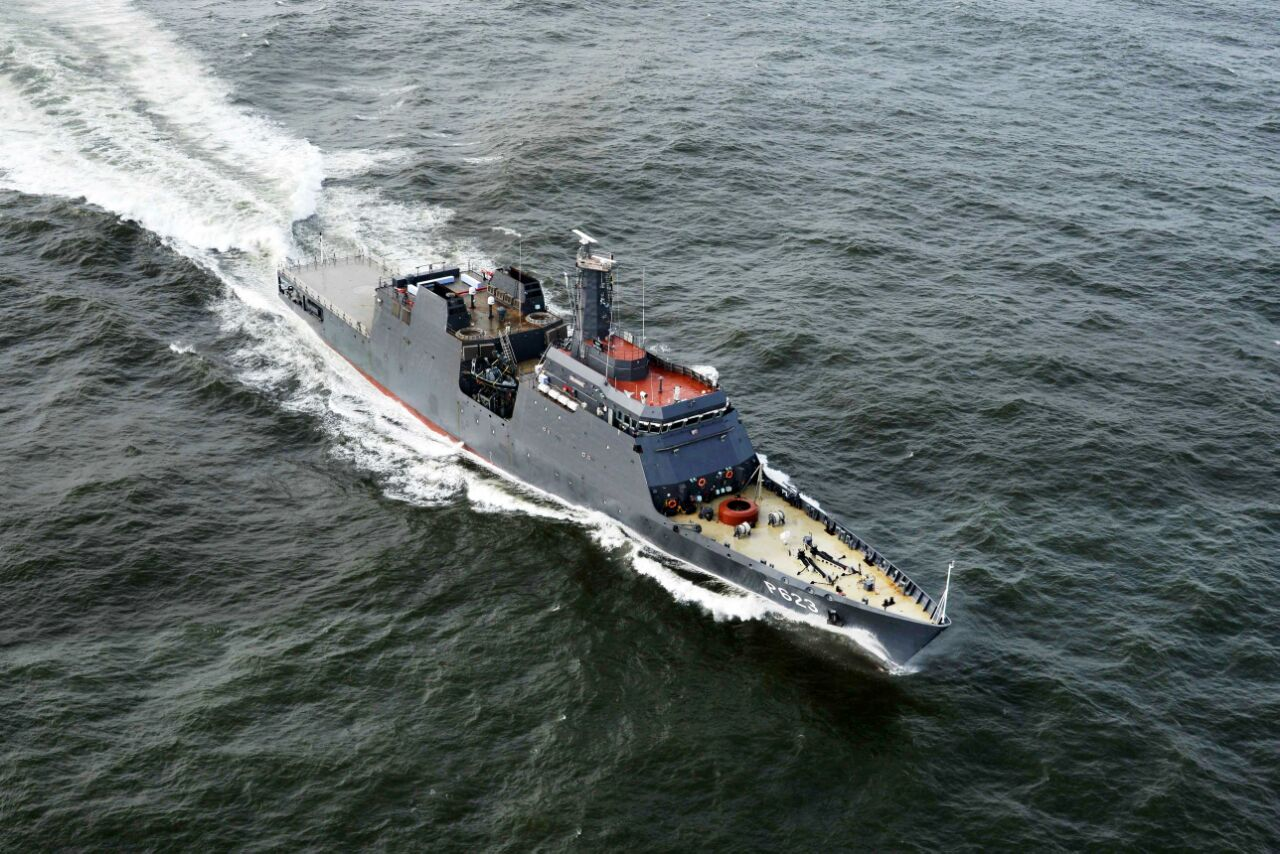
SLNS Sayurala

The Sri Lankan Navy with approximately 44,500 personal is the key maritime division of the Sri Lankan Armed Forces and is classed as the most vital defence force of Sri Lanka. It conducts maritime operations at sea for the defence of the Sri Lankan nation and its interests. The professional head of the navy is the Commander of the navy, who exercises his command from the Naval Headquarters in Colombo. Established in 1950 as the Royal Ceylon Navy it was renamed as the Sri Lanka Navy in 1972.

In recent years it had played a key role it the Sri Lankan civil war, conducting deep sea, coastal & inshore patrols, amphibious and supply operations. The navy has its own elite naval special forces unit, the Special Boat Squadron and Navy Marines.

== Air Force ==
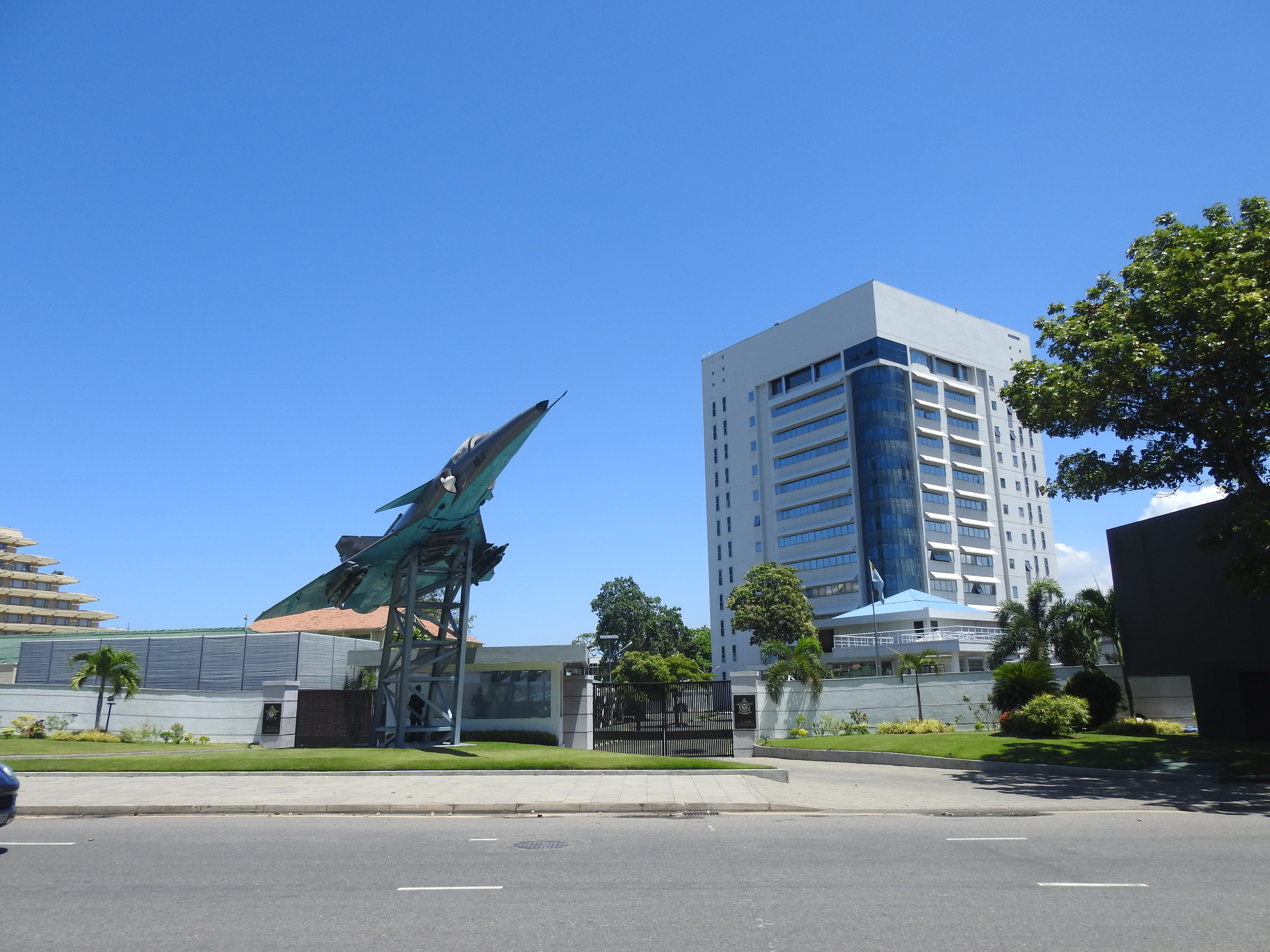
Sri Lanka Air Force Headquarters, Colombo

The Sri Lanka Air Force with approximately 28,700 personal is the aerial defence division and the youngest of the Sri Lankan Tri Forces. Founded in 1951 as the Royal Ceylon Air Force, it relied on the British Royal Air Force for its earliest equipment, training, and leadership. The Air Force played a major role in the war against Tamil separatists. Although Sri Lanka is only a small island state, its Air Force has proven highly capable and efficient. In recent times the air force has expanded to specialise mainly in providing air-support to ground forces and landing troops and carrying airstrikes on rebel held areas in the Northern and Eastern provinces.

== Paramilitary forces ==
There are two official paramilitary forces under the command of the Ministry of Defence, as well as another under the Minister of Justice:

- The Special Task Force comes under the control of the Sri Lanka Police which in turn is under the command of the Ministry of Defence. It undertakes counter-terrorist operations and VIP protection.
- The Sri Lanka Civil Defence Force, which is under direct command of the Ministry of Defence.
- The Sri Lanka Prisons Emergency Action and Tactical Force, which comes under the Department of Prisons tasked with security and riot control in prisons.

== Special Forces ==
The following Units are known to conduct special operations:

- Sri Lanka Army Commando Regiment
- Sri Lanka Army Special Forces Regiment
- Long Range Reconnaissance Patrol
- Special Boat Squadron - Sri Lanka Navy
- Special Airborne Force - Sri Lanka Air Force
- Sri Lanka Air Force Regiment Special Force - Sri Lanka Air Force
- Special Task Force - Sri Lanka Police
- Rapid Action Boat Squadron - Sri Lanka Navy

== Training ==
Today, all the armed forces is done in Sri Lanka. a Staff College ( Defence University), three Military Academies for the three armed services, and many specialised training schools and centers. Members of the Sri Lanka armed forces have high-level training and professionalism.

- General Sir John Kotelawala Defence University, Colombo
- National Defence College, Colombo
- Defence Services Command and Staff College
- Sri Lanka Military Academy, Diyatalawa
- Naval and Maritime Academy, Trincomalee
- Air Force Academy, SLAF China Bay, Trincomalee

The Sri Lankan military has received specialised training assistance from other nations such as China, Pakistan, Australia, the United Kingdom, Israel, the United States, India, and South Africa.

Referring to the overseas military training given to Sri Lanka, the U.S. government's contribution at a higher level. The Foreign Military Financing (FMF) and International Military Education and Training (IMET) programs helping to standardising and strengthening the country's military greatly.

== Development ==
Although much of the current military hardware used by the Sri Lanka Armed Forces is acquired from China, Pakistan, Israel, India, Russia, and the United States. Indigenous weapon systems have been developed and produces within Sri Lanka to suit its requirements. Most of these have been produced by the armed forces. In 1992 the Ordnance Factory was established beginning the manufacture of artillery and ammunition including trip flares in Sri Lanka. Sri Lanka Electrical and Mechanical Engineers (SLEME) is responsible for the production of armoured vehicles and other equipment to the armed forces and have produced several MRAP-type vehicles such as the Unibuffel. Naval Boat Building Yard (NBBY) of the Navy is responsible for the production of small boats such as the Cedric and Wave Rider classes alongside other private companies such as Solas Marine Lanka while the Colombo Dockyard supplies larger vessels.

Centre for Research & Development (CRD) is the Research and Development organisation of the Ministry of Defence and has developed UAVs, electronic warfare equipment, weapon systems, various simulators and network-centric warfare systems for the military. The tri-forces have their own R&D organisations with the Army Research Analysis Projection & Development Branch (RAP&D) of the Sri Lanka Army, Research and Development Unit of the Sri Lanka Navy and the Research and Development Wing of the Sri Lanka Air Force.

Equipment developed in Sri Lanka
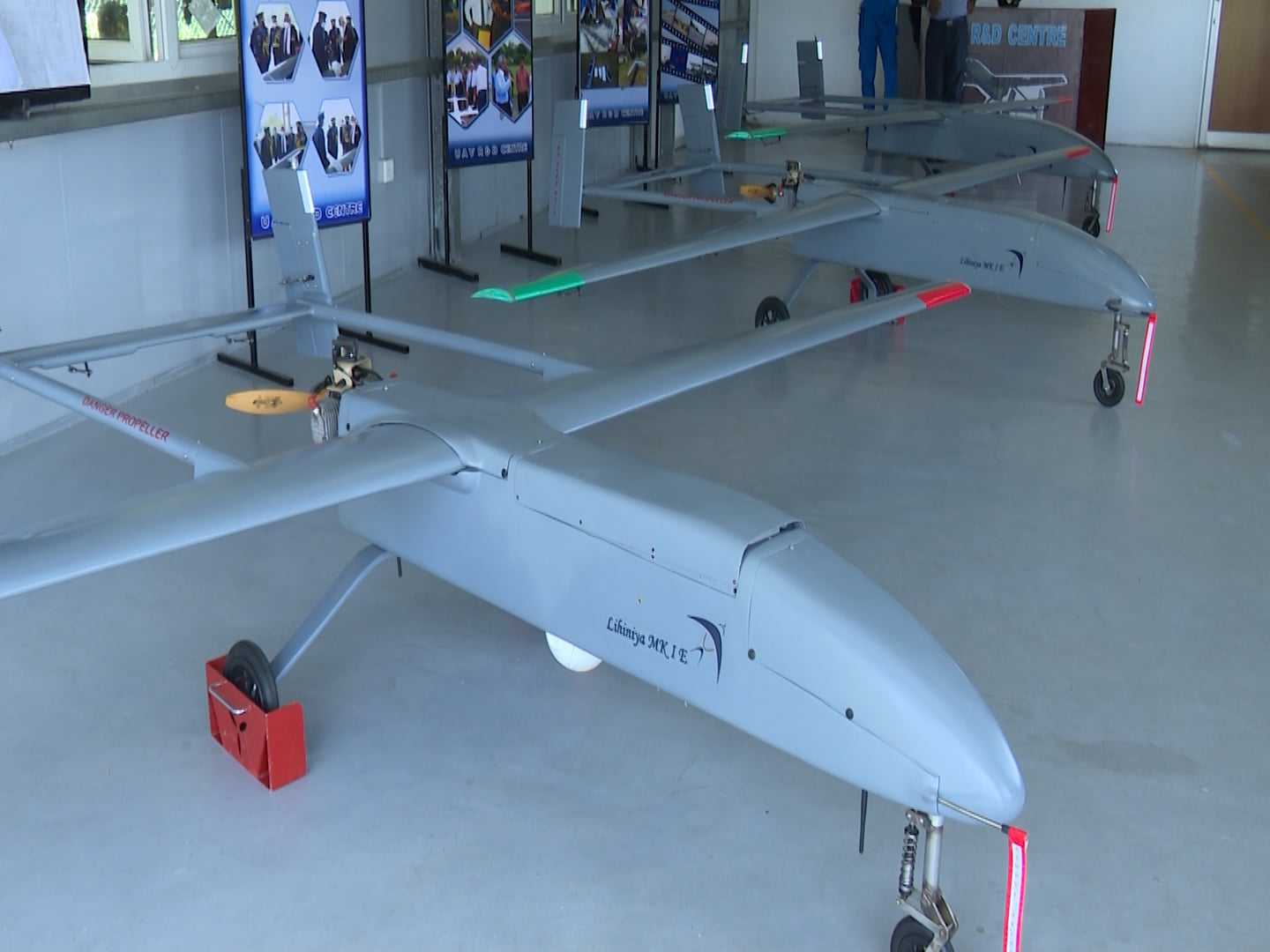
Sri Lanka Air Force and CRD developed medium range UAV Lihiniya MK I

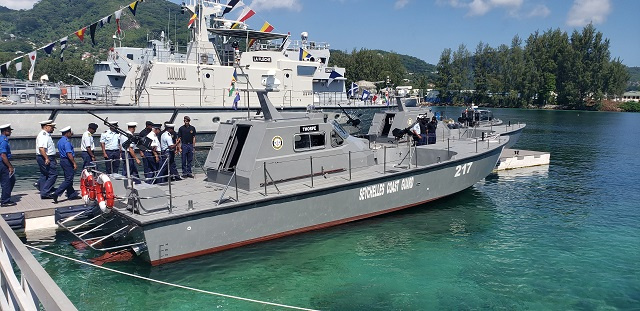
Wave Rider Class patrol boats which were donated to Seychelles Coast Guard by Government of Sri Lanka

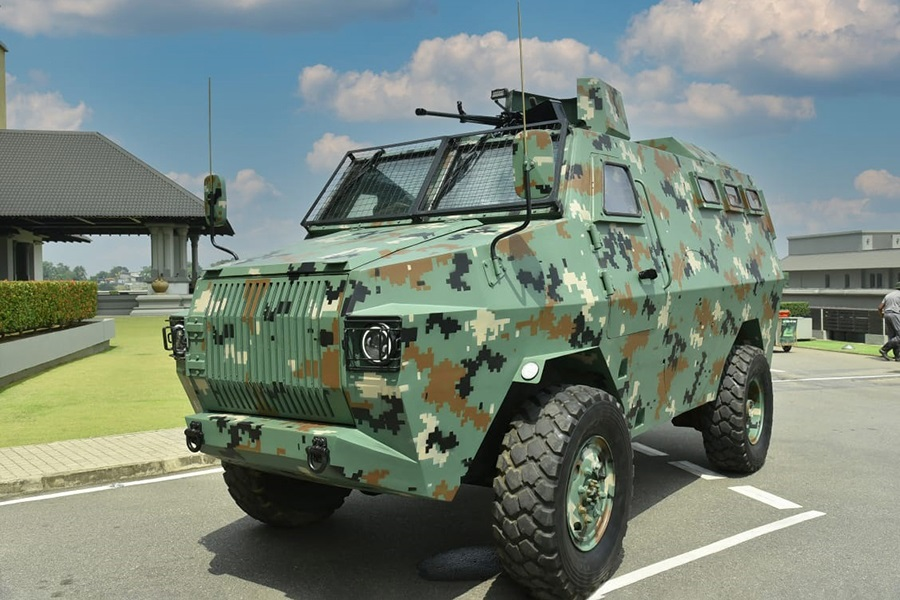
Unicob 4x4 Mine-Resistant Ambush Protected (MRAP) manufactured by SLEME

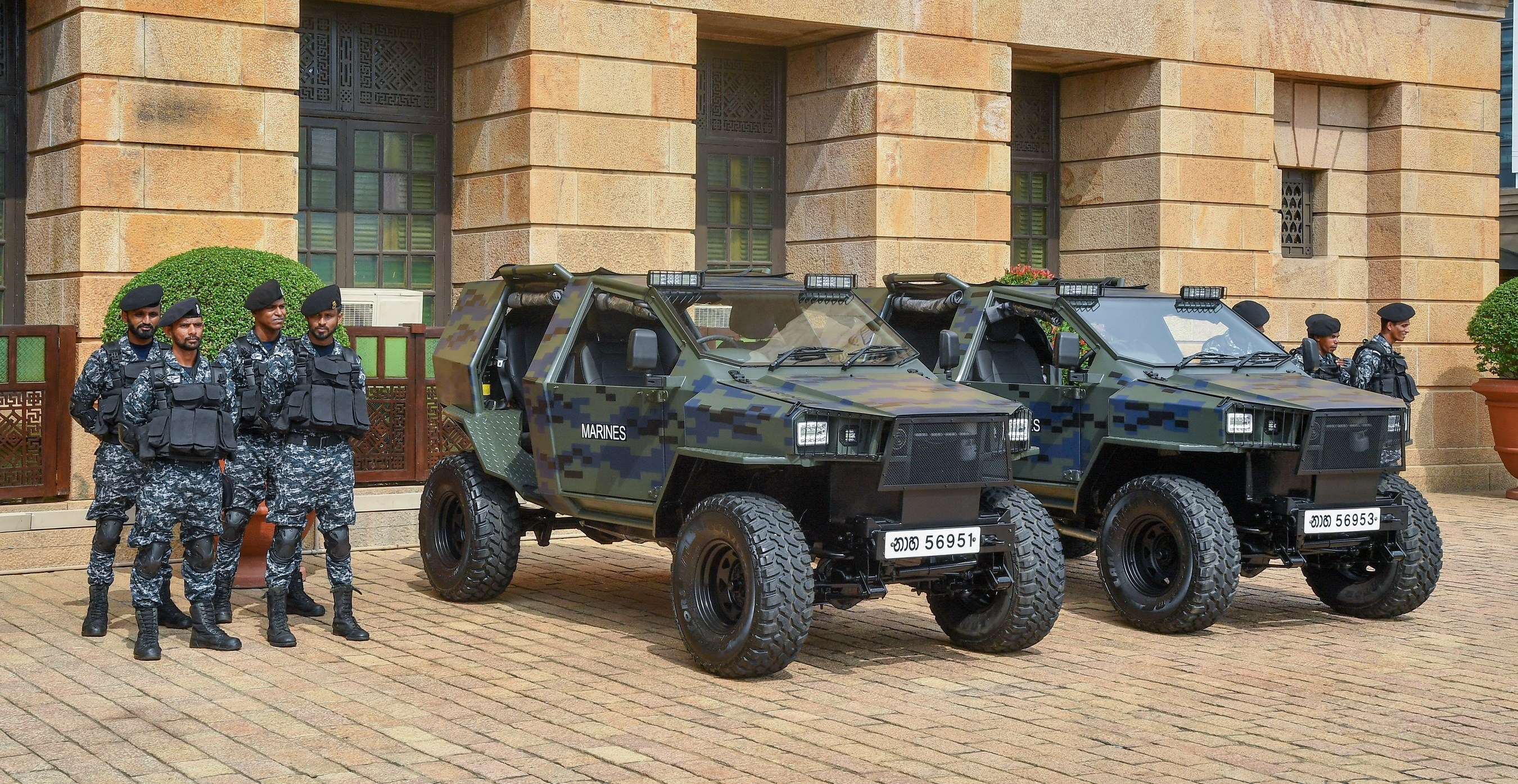
Combat All-Terrain Vehicles manufactured in Sri Lanka by Ideal Motors for Sri Lanka Marine Corps

== Awards and decorations ==
The highest military decoration awarded by the tri-forces is the Parama Weera Vibhushanaya, awarded to all regular and volunteer officers and service personnel who display extraordinary individual bravery in combat; thus far, all PWVs have been posthumous. A related award is the Uththama Pooja Pranama Padakkama, an exclusively posthumous decoration awarded to the family or next-of-kin of service personnel confirmed to be killed- or missing in action.

The highest civilian decoration awarded by the armed forces of Sri Lanka is the Weerodara Vibhushanaya, the military equivalent being the Weera Wickrama Vibhushanaya. The most recent commemorative decoration awarded was the Sri Lanka Air Force 50th Anniversary Medal, awarded in 2001. The armed forces (especially the Army) awards campaign medals for personnel that have taken part in successful, notable and high-risk operations: the first of these was the Vadamarachchi Operation Medal in 1983, while the latest (the Northern and Eastern Humanitarian Operations Medals) were awarded in 2010, following the conclusion of the Eelam War.

== Non-military activities ==
Since the end of the civil war in May 2009 Sri Lanka's 300,000 strong military has increased its non-military activities, leading to accusations of militarisation and even military rule. The military is involved in everything from large-scale property developments to the running of roadside cafes. The military has built roads, bridges, houses and stadiums. The Urban Development Authority, which spends hundreds billions of rupees a year, was taken over by the Ministry of Defence in 2010. A year later the ministry was renamed Ministry of Defence and Urban Development. The ministry will have a budget of 229.9 billion rupees ($2.1 billion) in 2012, the largest of any government ministry.

In early 2011, as food prices soared, the Army bought vegetables from farmers and then sold them to the public at below market prices. Some of the vegetables came from military farms. The Army also runs a travel agency called Air Travel Services (Pvt) Ltd selling air-tickets and foreign package holidays. In the war affected north of the country, where the military presence is significantly higher than the rest of the country even after the end of the conflict, the military operates numerous small restaurants and shops catering mainly for tourists from the south. Most of the roadside cafes along the A9 highway are owned and operated by the Army. The Army runs a luxurious holiday resort called Thalsevana near Kankesanthurai inside the Valikamam North High Security Zone where the residents were forcibly expelled in the early 1990s and have not been allowed to resettle despite the end of the civil war. The Army also runs two other holiday resorts, one in Kukuleganga and the other in Wadduwa. In November 2011 it was announced that the Army would build a five star hotel in Colombo. During 2010-11, whilst local government was suspended in Colombo using emergency regulations, the Army took over many of the functions of the Colombo Municipal Council such as supervision of the collection of rubbish, demolition of low income housing and even decoration of the streets during festivals.

The Navy's Jetliner (A542) passenger ship is used as a recreational cruise ship providing onboard weddings, receptions, corporate events, parties and other social functions. The Navy's A543 vessel provides a whale and dolphin watching service for tourists. The Navy also provides a canal-boat service in Colombo from Wellawatta to Nawala, a boat service to Adam's Bridge for tourists and a vegetable shop. Helitours is the commercial arm of the Air Force established in the 1970s. It was inactive during the civil war but after its end the business has started functioning again, taking advantage of the country's booming tourism.

From 2011 all undergraduates are required to take part in compulsory leadership training and the government has chosen the military to provide this training. In November 2011 it was announced that the military would take over the maintenance of the country's three international cricket stadiums from the financially troubled national cricket board. The Army has taken over the Hambantota Cricket Stadium, the Navy Pallekele Cricket Stadium and the Air Force Premadasa Stadium.

Many senior military commanders have been appointed to senior positions in the diplomatic and civil services: Air Chief Marshal Jayalath Weerakkody is the High Commissioner to Pakistan; Air Chief Marshal Donald Perera is the Ambassador to Israel; Major General Nanda Mallawaarachchi is the Ambassador to Indonesia; Major General Udaya Perera is the Deputy High Commissioner to Malaysia; Major General Jagath Dias is the Deputy Ambassador to Germany, Switzerland and the Vatican; Major General Shavendra Silva is the Deputy Permanent Representative to the UN; Admiral Wasantha Karannagoda is the Ambassador to Japan; Admiral Thisara Samarasinghe is the High Commissioner to Australia; Major General Amal Karunasekara is the chargé d'affaires in Eritrea; Major General G. A. Chandrasiri is the Governor of Northern Province; Mohan Wijewickrema s the Governor of Eastern Province; Rohan Daluwatte is the Chairman of the National Gem and Jewellery Authority; and Lieutenant General Jagath Jayasuriya and Air Chief Marshal Roshan Goonetilleke are board members of the Water's Edge Complex.

== See also ==
- List of attacks on civilians attributed to Sri Lankan government forces
