= Marriage in Sri Lanka =

Marriage in Sri Lanka is legally recognised in the forms of both customary, religious, and civil marriage. Traditionally, marriage was governed under different customary law that was practiced in certain areas of the island.

The Marriage Registration Ordinance, No. 19 of 1907 established the office of Registrar-General of Marriages to register and maintain records of religious and civil marriages in the island. In a Court of Appeal judgement in May 2026, the court upheld that a Marriage Certificate constitutes a "prima facie proof of the existence of the marriage" and "no administrative authority or officer has the power to determine the validity or invalidity of such marriage in the absence of a decree or declaration issued by a competent court".

== Customary laws ==
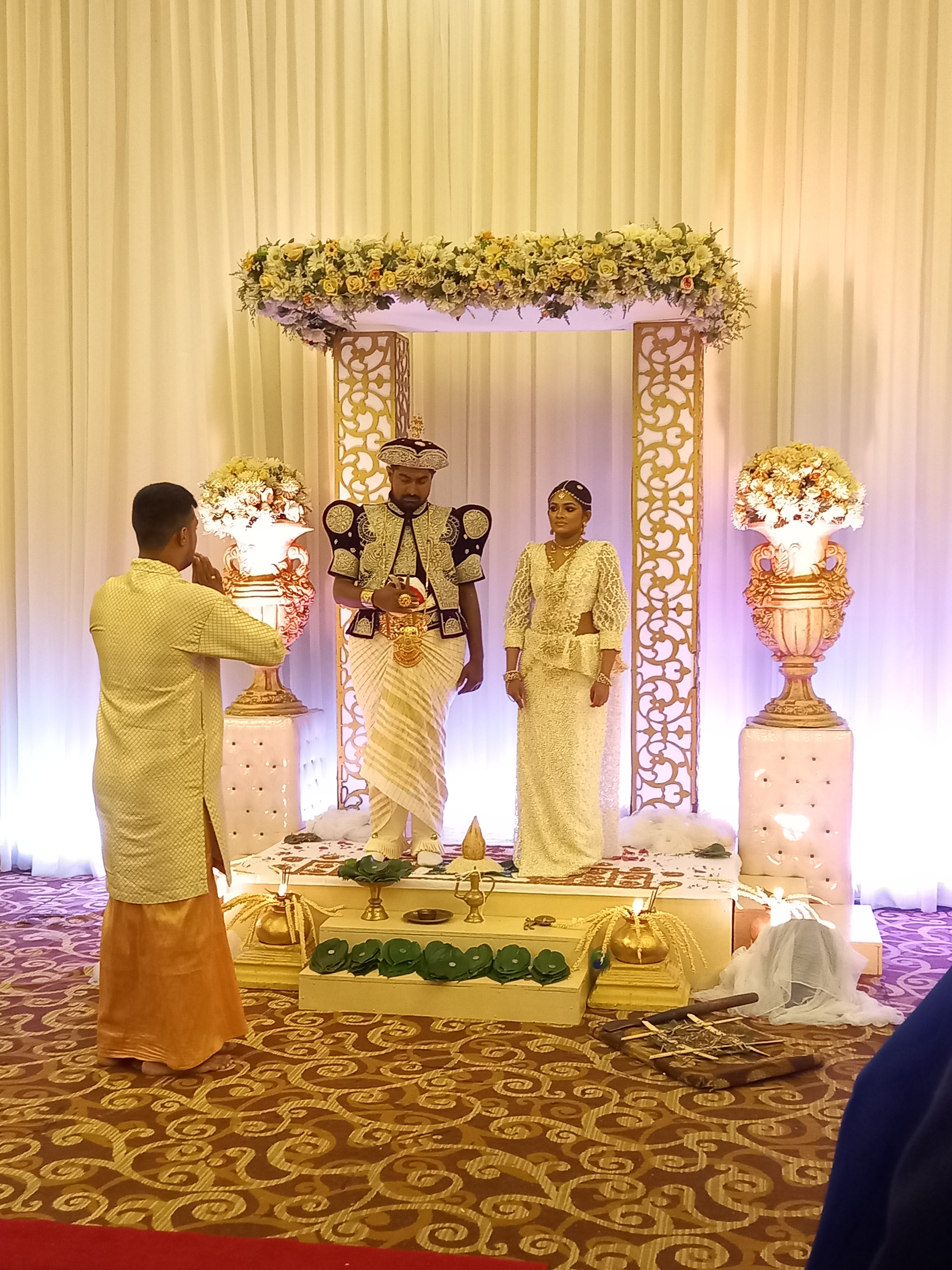
Sri Lankan wedding ceremony in the Kandian style.

Traditionally, based on customary laws, marriage was an informal union that was considered a union between two families as defined by the Kandyan law and the Thesavalamai. A ceremony such as the Poruwa ceremony was not an essential requirement of marriage. The Dutch who occupied the coastal areas found such practices to be heathen and recognised only marriages registered in the church rolls. This was later relaxed to include marriages celebrated by Hindu priests. Marriage under Muslim law was based on the nikah ceremony, with an offer and acceptance before the required number of witnesses. There has been calls for reform of Muslim Marriage Law.

== General law ==
The British colonial government issued the Marriage Registration Ordinance No 19 of 1907, as the general marriage law in the island, influenced of Roman Dutch law and English law with the Christian ethic of marriage. This law now applies to low-country Sinhalese and Tamils. Kandyans may marry under the General law.

== Divorce ==
Under the General law, divorce is fault-based; with adultery, desertion and impotency remain the principal grounds of divorce. Attempts to a breakdown ground in 1977 failed. Divorce in customary law remains more administrative.

== Polygamy ==
In Sri Lanka, Polygyny is permitted under Muslim law, a man may take up to four wives as allowed under the Muslim Marriage and Divorce Act (MMDA). Polyandry was practiced by Royalty and commoners alike in Sri Lanka until the colonial period, when the practice was outlawed under Marriage Registration Ordinance and the Penal Code.

== See also ==
- Polygamy in Sri Lanka
- Poruwa ceremony
