= Capital punishment in Sri Lanka =

Capital punishment is a legal penalty in Sri Lanka, enforceable under Chapter XVI, Section 296 of the Penal Code Ordinance of Sri Lanka.

Although no executions have been carried out since 23 June 1976, death sentences continue to be handed down by the High and Supreme Courts for murder and drug trafficking convictions. The government decided to reinstate capital punishment in 2004 for cases of rape, drug trafficking and murder after the assassination of High Court judge Sarath Ambepitiya. Perjury that results in execution of an innocent person, treason, armed robbery, some military offences and certain crimes committed with the use of a gun (such as kidnapping, extortion, human trafficking, assault on a public servant) can also result in the death penalty.

== History ==
The death penalty has a long history in Sri Lanka. The British restricted the death penalty after they took control of the island in 1815 to the crimes of murder and "waging war against the King."

After independence, then Prime Minister S. W. R. D. Bandaranaike abolished capital punishment in 1956. However, it was quickly reintroduced after his assassination in 1959. Opposition to the death penalty started to become increasingly widespread and the United National Party government modified the use of it in its 1978 rewrite of the constitution. Under the new arrangement, death sentences could only be carried out if authorised by the trial judge, the Attorney General and the Minister of Justice. If there was no agreement, the sentence was to be commuted to life imprisonment. The sentence was also to be ratified by the President. This clause effectively ended executions. The last execution in Sri Lanka took place in 1976.

In March 1999, after spurts of violence near the end of her first term in office, Chandrika Kumaratunga stated that the government would be reintroducing the death penalty. However, she was forced to back down in the face of overwhelming public protest. The issue hung in the balance, with all death sentences from then on being neither commuted to life nor carried out. After discussions were held regarding the matter, the motion that commuted all death sentences to life in prison was revoked in January 2001.

On 19 November 2004, High Court Judge Sarath Ambepitiya was gunned down as he arrived home from work. He had a reputation for handing out tough sentences. The assassination immediately prompted Kumaratunga to effectively reinstate capital punishment.

With the end of the Sri Lankan Civil War the country saw a sharp rise in child abuse, rape, murder and drug trafficking, prompting some lawyers and politicians to call for the reinstatement of the death penalty. In 2015, newly elected President Maithripala Sirisena, said he supports a dialogue on the introduction of the death penalty should it be approved by Parliament. The statement coming after a series of high-profile incidents of rape, killing and sexual abuse.

The death penalty, if put into action, would be carried out by hanging at the gallows situated in Colombo. As of 2015, there are 1,116 convicts on death row.

In 2018, it was reported that Sri Lanka was going to reinstate capital punishment for drug dealers. President Maithripala Sirisena told the government, which earlier had unanimously backed the reinstatement of capital punishment, that he “was ready to sign the death warrants”. In February 2019, he told parliament that the death penalty for convicted drug offenders would be reinstated within two months. On 26 June, President Maithripala Sirisena signed death warrants with the execution dates for four convicts with drug-related offences, the first time that executions were ordered in 43 years. According to the president's office, the executions are meant to be a powerful message to those involved in drug trafficking. In June 2019, the first two hangmen in 43 years were hired. The country's president has also demanded the capital punishment for those responsible of the Easter Sunday attacks in the country.

On 24 November 2025, a court in Embilipitiya, sentenced 10 people to death, including three women, for assaulting and killing a 30-year-old man in a rural area in October 2011. Two other accused, a male and a female, were acquitted due to lack of evidence.

== Notable cases ==
- Maru Sira, criminal who gained fame through many daring prison escapes, executed by hanging on 7 August 1975. Originally he was sentenced to death in absentia for killing of a man in March 1974. The night before his execution, prison guards gave him Largactil in strong dosage in an attempt to prevent him escaping, but this caused him to collapse and his hanging was botched because the short fall caused by his slumped position, caused him to strangle instead of breaking his neck and killing him instantly.
- Talduwe Somarama, a Buddhist monk responsible for the assassination of S. W. R. D. Bandaranaike in 1959. He was executed by hanging on 6 July 1962. A fortnight before his execution, he gave up his robes, and two days before, he was baptised by an Anglican priest.

== See also ==
- Law of Sri Lanka
- Judiciary of Sri Lanka
- Human rights in Sri Lanka
