= Mahara prison riot =

Prison riot in Sri Lanka

- Location: Mahara Prison, Mahara, Western Province, Sri Lanka
- Date: 29 November 2020
- Attack type: Prison riot, arson, gun shot
- Weapon: Gun
- Deaths: 11
- Injuries: 117
- Perpetrator: a senior member of the Mahara Prison Hospital staff
- Motive: COVID-19 pandemic

Mahara prison riot was an arson attack which took place between the prison inmates and police officials from 29 November 2020 to 30 November 2020 at the Mahara Prison in Sri Lanka at the outskirts of the capital city of Colombo in Mahara. As of 30 November 2020, 11 inmates were reportedly killed and about 117 inmates were severely injured during the prison riot. Police guards opened fire to control the arson attack and also in order to prevent a jail break. A fire also spread from the Mahara fire following gun shots, and most of the deceased inmates succumbed to gun shots. It was revealed that prison inmates set fire to the kitchens inside the prison facility and briefly took two wardens hostage. The riots occurred following the rumours and speculations regarding the transferring of COVID-19 infected prisoners to Mahara Prison from other crowded prisons. Initially the prison inmates staged unrest demanding the officials and authorities to increase the PCR testing following the surge in COVID-19 cases in Sri Lankan prisons. Prior to the riots, around 12 prisoners tested positive for COVID-19.

Police spokesperson Ajith Rohana stated that prison inmates triggered the unrest which turned into a prison riot. He also indicated that the prison inmates attempted to break the walls of prisons in order to escape. He further mentioned that the police officers had to open fire in order to prevent the prisoners from escaping. Around two police officers were also injured and have been hospitalised. Over 200 police commandos were deployed in the area and before the situation was brought under control. On 1 December 2020, it was reported that a further 36 prisoners were injured, bringing the tally to 107. The riot which started on 29 November 2020 in the evening lasted until 30 November 2020 in the afternoon.

== Background ==
Sri Lanka which was initially successful in handling the first wave of the pandemic, but recorded a sudden spike of COVID-19 cases starting in October after a fresh surge at Brandix, a popular apparel retailer, as well as at a fish market in Peliyagoda. The second wave of COVID-19 infections also took its toll in various prisons in Sri Lanka with over 1,000 cases reported since October 2020. As a result, prison inmates staged hunger strikes and protests demanding for better treatment and healthcare facilities. According to several sources, Sri Lankan prisons were heavily congested with each jail having over 26,000 inmates. As of November 2020, two prison inmates died due to the coronavirus.

== Aftermath ==
The eight bodies of the prison inmates were taken to the Teaching Hospital in Ragama. The Inspector General of Police C. D. Wickramaratne requested the Criminal Investigation Department to conduct an immediate investigation and probe into the Mahara riots, to which a Senior Superintendent of police was appointed. All 71 people, including two police officers, who were critically injured were admitted at the Ragama Teaching Hospital. On 30 November 2020, Ajith Rohana revealed that one of the senior members of the Mahara Prison Hospital staff was the mastermind behind the prison riots. The Minister of Justice Ali Sabry appointed a five-member panel to investigate the violence.

== See also ==
- 2012 Welikada prison riot
- 2020 Maligawatta stampede
