= Bogambara Prison =

Former prison in Sri Lanka

Coordinates: 7.290564°N 80.635453°E

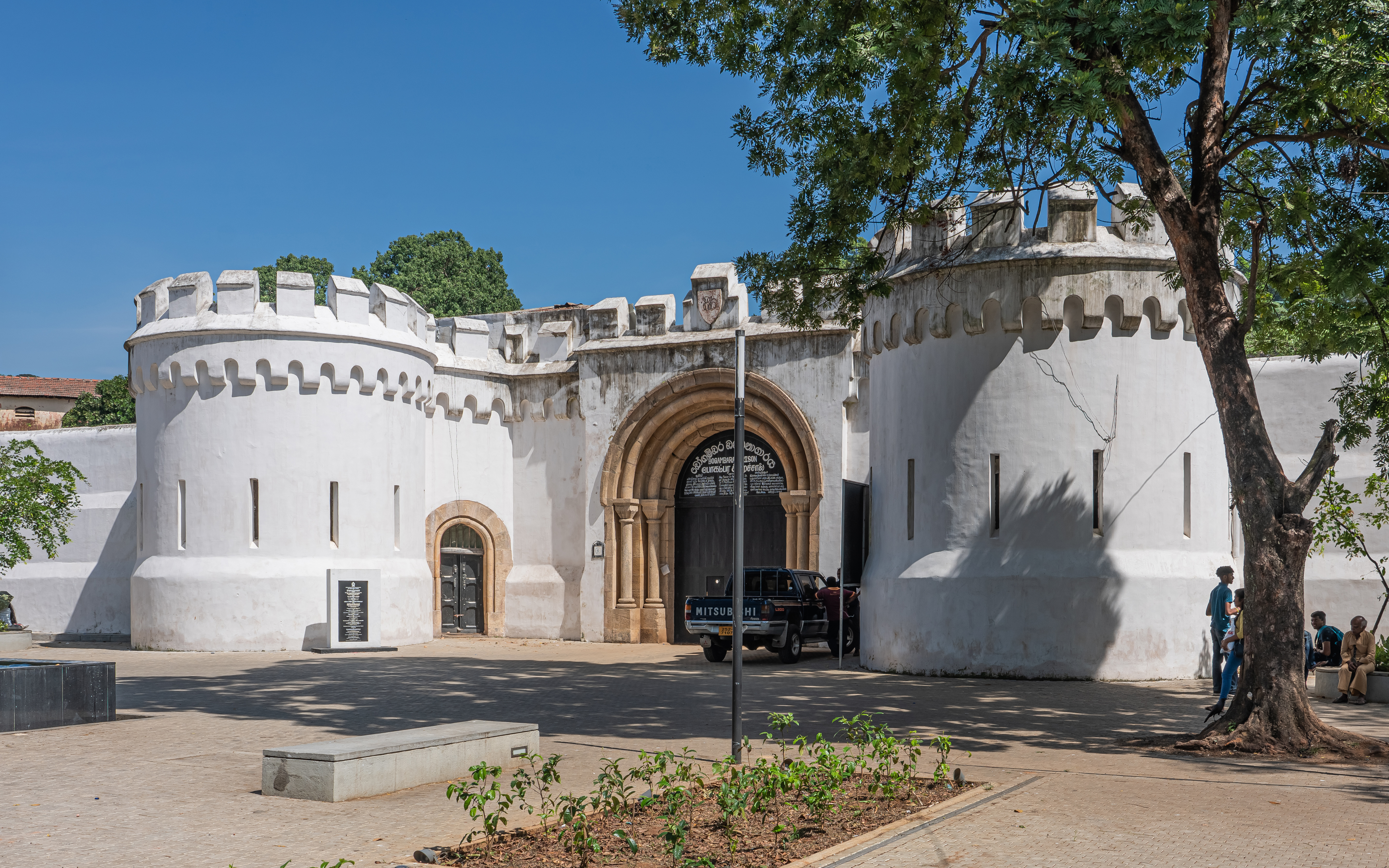
- Interactive map of Bogambara Prison
- Location: Bogambara, Kandy, Central Province, Sri Lanka
- Status: Closed
- Security class: Maximum security
- Population: 1,450 (2013)
- Opened: 1876
- Closed: 1 January 2014
- Former name: Bogambara Prison
- Managed by: Ministry of Megapolis and Western Development

Notable prisoners
- See list

Bogambara Prison was a maximum security prison and the second largest prison in the country after Welikada Prison in Colombo, Sri Lanka. After operating for 138 years, the prison was closed on 1 January 2014, and the inmates were transferred to the new Dumbara prison complex in Pallekele. In 2019, the government declared the prison site would become a cultural tourism centre, the Bogambara Cultural Park.

== History ==
=== Prison ===
In 1815, the British took possession of Sri Lanka following the signing of the Kandyan Convention. The first Prison Ordinance, An Ordinance for the Better Regulation of Prisons Act No. 18, was enacted by the British in 1844. It placed the supervision and control of all prisons under the jurisdiction of the Inspector General of Prisons and Police, Sir George William Robert Campbell. The first prison to be established under this Act was the Welikada Prison. In the early 1870s the British Ceylon Government resolved to construct a new prison in Kandy under instruction from Frederick Richard Saunders, the Inspector General of Prisons and Police.

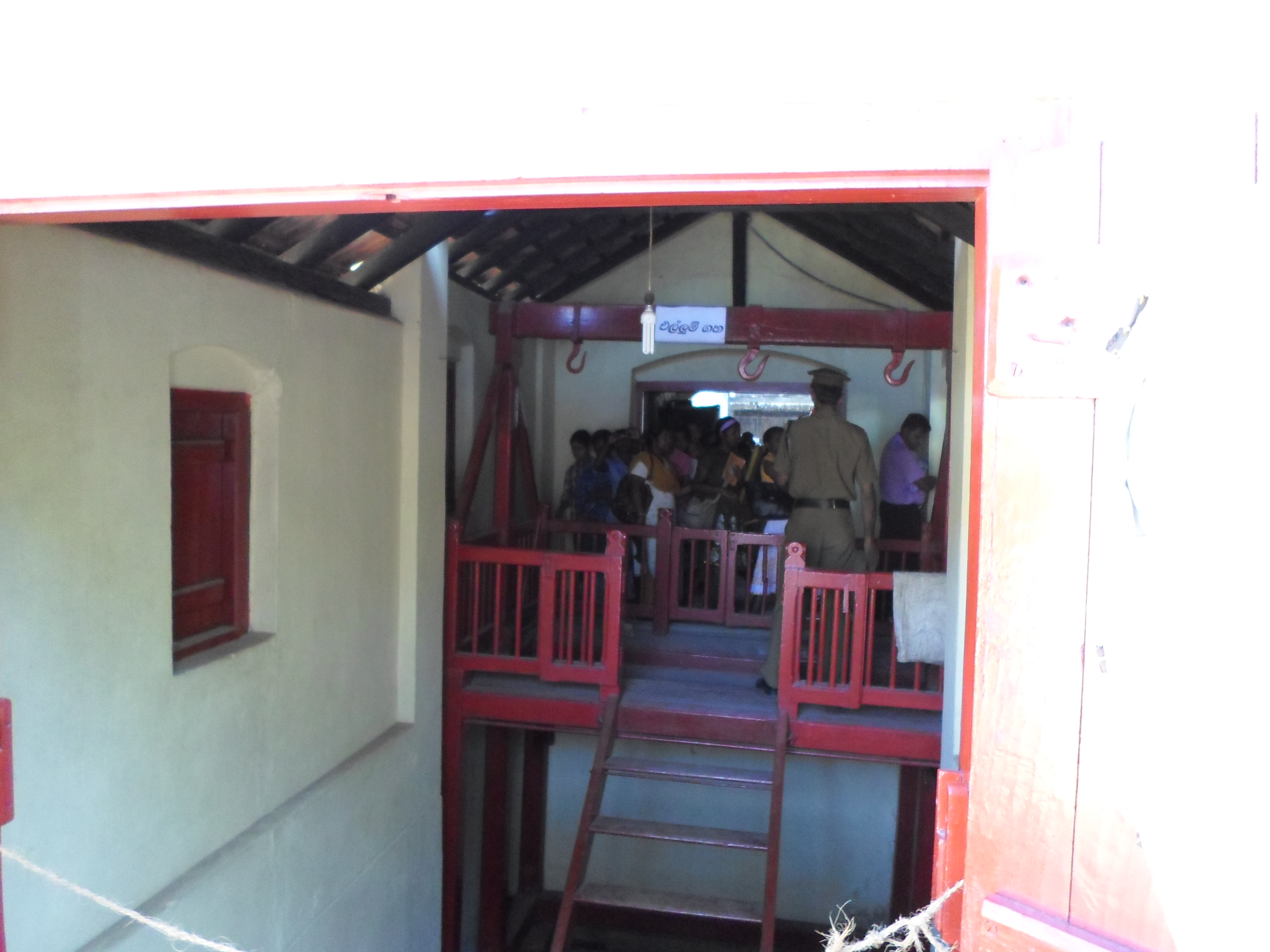
Gallows of the Prison

The grounds of the prison were created by filling in the Bogambara Wewa (an artificial lake), and the buildings were designed by F. Vine of the Public Works Department of Ceylon. The design of the main gate and walls are said to be inspired by the Bastille. The prison occupied a 5.3 ha (13 acres) area, with a three-storey 8,500 m^{2} (91,000 sq ft) main building containing 382 cells, in which would be held 408 prisoners, and a 840 m^{2} (9,000 sq ft) prison hospital building to its west. The prison was opened in 1876, and it was used to house serious offenders and death row prisoners.

The complex has gallows and was one of Sri Lanka's only two prisons where the death penalty was implemented. The gallows were shifted from Hangman's Hill to the prison in 1876. In all, 524 prisoners were executed at Bogambara. The convicted murderers W. A. Richard and T. M. Jayawardena were the last people hanged there on 21 and 22 November 1975, respectively. One of the most notorious criminals to be executed at the prison was D. J. Siripala (aka Maru Sira) who was executed on 7 August 1975. The prison was administered by the Department of Prisons.

In an effort to expand the prison network in the country and improve prison conditions, the Sri Lankan government decided to permanently close the complex in 2013. The remaining inmates were transferred to a new prison complex in Pallekele. A few months earlier, the Department of Prisons also closed the Bogambara remand prison in order to help preserve the historic buildings of the Kandyan Kingdom. Bogambara Prison was closed on 1 January 2014, at which time the property and all related assets were transferred to the government of Sri Lanka.

=== Cultural Park ===
In December 2016 the Ministry of National Policies and Economic Affairs created a project master plan for the redevelopment of the site.

In June 2018 the prison was opened to the public for four days along with Meda Wasala, Kandy Municipal Council building and Ehelepola Walauwa, as part of a program to promote Kandy's heritage led by the Urban Development Authority (UDA), in conjunction with the Japan International Cooperation Agency (JICA).

On 24 August 2019, Prime Minister Ranil Wickramasinghe formally announced the opening and inauguration of Phase I of the redevelopment of the prison as a cultural tourism centre, renaming the site the Bogambara Cultural Park. The redevelopment plans for the historic site feature the prison's transformation into a multi-use building, with the cells and rooms proposed to be converted into shops, shared workspaces and budget accommodations, and two five-star hotels will be built on site. The first phase of the redevelopment project was the enhancement of the prison's external surrounds at a cost of approximately Rs. 125 million. The second phase, the redevelopment of the internal buildings is estimated to cost Rs. 750 million. The completed project is estimated to have cost Rs. 18.5 billion.

== Notable prisoners ==
- Dr Colvin R. de Silva - Lanka Sama Samaja Party leader, anti-war movement leader during World War II and later a Member of Parliament.
- Philip Gunawardena - Lanka Sama Samaja Party leader, anti-war movement leader during World War II and later a Member of Parliament.
- William de Silva - Lanka Sama Samaja Party leader, anti-war movement leader during World War II and later a Member of Parliament.
- Utuwankande Sura Saradiel - Death row inmate executed for rebellious activities against the British Ceylon.
- Maru Sira - Death row inmate executed amidst great controversy.

== See also ==
- Angunakolapelessa Prison
- Mahara Prison
- Welikada Prison
