= Polygamy in Sri Lanka =

In Sri Lanka, polygyny and polyandry were both practiced. Today, polygyny is only limited to the Muslim community, while polygyny and polyandry is illegal to other communities, punishable under the Penal Code.

== Kandyan law ==
Customary marriage tradition of the island on which Kandyan law is based on, which considered marriage as an informal union or co-habitation. This included a practice of polygamy among both Royalty and commoners alike, with brothers taking on a single wife to father their children, known as eka-ge-kema meaning eating in one house. James Emerson Tennent, had noted "The…custom was at one time universal throughout the island, but the influence of the Portuguese and Dutch sufficed to discountenance and extinguish it in the maritime provinces", however there is evidence that it continued to be practiced. In 1855, the British Governor received a petition from Kandyan Chiefs who were part of the native department to abolition polygamy and polyandry by legislation. After repeating this petition twice in 1858, the British proceeded to outlaw polygamy and divorce by mutual consent in 1859 making registered monogamous marriage the only legal form of marriage. Scholars have claimed that this was a move by landowning native headmen who wanted to reform marriage with the aim to reduce divorced and widowed women's claims on family lands of their parents, which were generally exploited by their brothers.

== Muslim law ==
At present, Polygyny is permitted under Muslim law, where a man may take up to four wives as allowed under the Muslim Marriage and Divorce Act (MMDA). Calls have been made to reform this practice.
