= Sri Lanka Prisons Emergency Action and Tactical Force =

The Sri Lanka Prisons Emergency Action and Tactical Force (SPEAT FORCE) was formed in 2022 under the Department of Prisons, following the restructure of the former prison intelligence unit by the Minister of Justice. The unit is tasked with security duties, protection of special prisoners/suspects, riot control and other duties. It consists of ex-military personnel.

== See also ==
- Judiciary of Sri Lanka
- Law of Sri Lanka
