= Angunakolapelessa Prison =

Prison in Sri Lanka

- Location in Sri Lanka
- Location: Hambantota District, Sri Lanka; 6°08′47.2″N 80°53′44.4″E
- Status: Operational
- Security class: High (Male/Female)
- Capacity: 1,200
- Opened: 16 October 2017
- Managed by: Department of Prisons

Angunakolapelessa Prison (Sinhala: අගුණකොලපැලැස්ස බන්ධනාගාරය, romanized: aguṇakolapælæssa bandhanāgāraya), is a maximum security prison in the Hambantota District of Sri Lanka. The prison complex occupies a site of 26 ha (65 acres) and the total number of inmates that can be accommodated at the prison is 1,200

== History ==
In June 2012 the Rajapaksa cabinet endorsed a proposal by the Minister of Rehabilitation and Prison Reforms, Chandrasiri Gajadeera, to relocate the Tangalle prison to a site in the Angunakolapelassa area at an estimated cost Rs.357.84 million.

In 2014 February the Speaker of the House and Member of parliament for Hambantota, Chamal Rajapaksa, laid the foundation stone for the prison. Construction commenced on 16 May 2014, by a local company, Sanken Construction (Pvt.) Ltd, and took over eighteen months to complete. It was originally to be opened on 16 March 2017 by President, Maithripala Sirisena, but was postponed as the President declined the invitation. It was formally declared opened on 16 October by Minister of Prison Reforms, Rehabilitation, Resettlement and Hindu Religious Affairs, D. M. Swaminathan. The estimated cost of the construction was Rs. 9.5 billion.

The first inmates were transferred from Tangalle remand prison on 3 November 2017, with subsequent transfers of long-term male and female prisoners from Welikada Prison.

== Facilities ==
The prison facilities also include onsite accommodation for 140 prison officers and their families, a hospital, fire station, 100 person cafeteria, and lecture halls. It has a three-storey indoor sport complex, with outdoor volleyball and netball courts, a 7-lane swimming pool and a sports field, with a 4,000 m (13,000 ft) track.

== 2018 assault ==
In November 2018 CCTV footage at the prison was leaked to the press, in which prison officials, including the prison superintendent, were shown assaulting inmates with batons. The inmates having protested earlier against the alleged strip searches by members of the Special Task Force on 21 October. The government in January 2019 appointed a three-man committee, headed by Prisons Commissioner-General, Nishan Dhanasinghe, to undertake a special inquiry into the attack. The use of the Special Task Force was controversial due to their previous involvement in the 2012 Welikada prison riot, where 27 prisoners were killed.

== See also ==
- Department of Prisons
- Bogambara Prison
- Mahara Prison
- Welikada Prison
