= Ehelepola Walauwa =

Ancestral home of Ehelepola Disawe and his family

- ඇල්ලේපොල වලව්ව
- Location within Sri Lanka
- Alternative names: Bogambara Remand Prison

General information
- Type: Walauwa
- Location: Raja Veediya, Kandy, Sri Lanka
- Coordinates: 07°17′41.3″N 80°38′19.14″E
- Current tenants: vacant
- Completed: early 19th century
- Owner: Urban Development Authority

Technical details
- Floor count: two

Archaeological Protected Monument of Sri Lanka
- Designated: 8 July 2005

Ehelepola Walauwa (ඇල්ලේපොල වලව්ව) was the ancestral home (or walauwa) of Ehelepola Disawe and his family and is located in Kandy, Sri Lanka.

In Sinhalese, walauwa refers to a feudal/colonial manor house or ancestral residence of a native Ceylonese headmen. The walauwa were traditionally associated with the homes of the courtiers (radala), members of the royal court in Kandy. It was displaced by their colonial equivalents following the dissolution of the Kingdom of Kandy by the British.

Ehelepola Nilame (1773 – 1829) was a courtier of the Kingdom of Kandy. He was the first Adigar (a role which combined the powers of a prime minister and a chief justice) from 1811 to 1814 under the reign of King Sri Vikrama Rajasinha. He was appointed by the king as the Disawe (local governor) of Sabaragamuva. In 1814 when the king believed he failed to suppress an uprising in Sabaragamuva he sent his forces to capture Ehelepola, who fled from Ratnapura to the British-occupied port of Kalutara. The king retaliated by brutally executing his wife, Kumarihamy and his four children, Loku Bandara, Madduma Bandara, Tikiri Manike and Dingiri Menike. Ehelepola then aided the British in launching an invasion of the Kingdom of Kandy and was instrumental in the Kandyan Convention that followed in March 1815, which led to the annexing of Kingdom of Kandy as part of the British Empire. Ehelepola offered his Walauwa to the Maha Sangha.

Following the Uva Rebellion in 1818 the British imprisoned 53 chieftains, nobles and Buddhist prelates in the walauwa. Madugalle Nilame, Ellepola Nilame, Keppatipola Nilame and Kivulegedara Mohottirala were some of the inmates of this prison before they were executed by the British.

Ehelapola Walauwa continued to be part of the Kandy prison complex until the country's independence in 1948. After independence, the walauwa continued to be part of Bogambara Prison.

In 1998 it was designated as a 'Conserved Building' by the UNESCO as part of the listing of Kandy as a World Heritage City. On 8 July 2005 it was formally included as an 'Archaeological Protected Monument' by the government.

On 13 July 2013 the 0.3866 ha (0.955 acres) site was transferred from the Department of Prisons to the President, Mahinda Rajapaksa for development as a Cultural and Urban Facility Centre. In June 2018 the walauwa was opened to the public for four days, along with Meda Wasala, Kandy Municipal Council building and Bogambara Prison, as part of a program to promote Kandy's heritage by the Urban Development Authority (UDA), in conjunction with the Japan International Cooperation Agency (JICA).

The Bogambara Remand Prison site comprises three buildings, the former Ehelepola Walawwa and two two-storey cell block buildings. In 2018 the JICA identified that the cell block buildings had been rehabilitated but not properly conserved, with most of the historic materials removed, and replaced with new materials. The walawwa still retained its central courtyard and was not yet renovated but did have a temporary shed structure over the roof to prevent water damage. At the time the UDA were considering converting the building into a restaurant and craft store.

== See also ==
- Kandyan Convention
- Walauwa
