= Sri Lanka Judicial Service =

The Judicial Service in Sri Lanka forms the professional judges of the Judiciary of Sri Lanka. It consists of the judges of the Supreme Court, the Court of Appeal, High Courts and the judicial officers (District judges and Magistrates). Appointments are made by the President and the Judicial Service Commission.
