= Mukkuva laws =

Mukkuva laws is the traditional law of Tamil inhabitants of Batticaloa district, of Sri Lanka codified by the Dutch during their colonial rule in 1707. The Law in its present form applies to most Tamils in eastern Sri Lanka. The law is personal in nature, thus it is applicable mostly for property and marriage.

== See also ==
- Thesavalamai
