= Deauville Sport Images Festival =

- Locations: Deauville, France
- Organiser: Government of Deauville

The Deauville Sport Images Festival is an annual sports photography festival held in Deauville, France. Established in 2025, the festival centers on the themes of current events, society, artistic photography, and historic photography.

== History ==
=== 2026 ===
Midway through the festival's 2026 edition, a photo showing a football field in Gaza with destroyed buildings behind it was removed from the festival. The photo, by Palestinian reporter Jehad Alshrafi for the Associated Press, was replaced at the end of August 2026. The festival confirmed the image was removed after requests from external sources, with organizers saying they "don’t want to get into a controversy, nor offend anyone."

On 1 September 2026, a judge at an administrative court in Caen ruled the Deauville city hall was unjustified in its decision to remove the photo from the festival.
