= Sarath Ambepitiya =

Sri Lankan judge

Judge Sarath Ambepitiya

Judge of the High Court of Sri Lanka in Colombo

Personal details
- Born: 19 November 1946 British Colony of Ceylon
- Died: 19 November 2004 (aged 58) Colombo, Sri Lanka
- Cause of death: Assassination by gunshot
- Education: Royal College Colombo, Sri Lanka Law College
- Profession: lawyer, judge

Sarath Ambepitiya (November 19, 1946 – November 19, 2004) was a Sri Lankan jurist. He was serving as a Judge of the Colombo High Court when he was assassinated. The assassination, orchestrated by a drug lord sentenced by the judge, gripped the nation and forced the government to crack down on organized crime.

== Education ==
Educated at the Royal College, Colombo, Ambepitiya entered the Sri Lanka Law College to study law and was called to the bar as an attorney at law.

== Career ==
After practicing law for some time, he joined the judiciary in 1977 and served as a Magistrate in many parts of the island. Later he was appointed Chief Magistrate of Colombo and then Additional District Judge of Colombo. Ambepitiya's first appointment as a High Court Judge was in Galle, after which he was appointed as a High Court Judge in Colombo. He was noted for his fearlessness in rendering strong judgments and taking up cases that other judges feared to adjudicate upon. Ambepitiya presided over many important criminal cases including the Central Bank bombing case.

== Assassination ==
Ambepitiya was shot dead by assassins at his official residence along with his bodyguard, Police Inspector Upali Ranasinghe, on November 19, 2004. At the time of his death, he was one of the most senior judges of the High Court and was expected to be promoted to the Court of Appeal of Sri Lanka. Only the day before, he celebrated his 58th birthday with a visit to the Kelaniya temple. The Chief Justice described Ambepitiya as "the most fearless judicial officer we had. His death is a great loss to the judiciary". The President later gifted his official residence to his family.

=== Conviction ===
Five men were indicted over the murder of Ambepitiya. This included the alleged mastermind, Mohammed Niyas Naufer alias Potta Naufer on charges of conspiracy to commit murder; and Sujith Rohana Rupasinghe, Suminda Nishantha, Udara Perera and Lasantha Kumara, who were alleged to have carried out the murder. On July 4, 2005, amid high security and following a three-month trial, a High Court Trial-at-Bar reached a unanimous verdict finding the five men guilty of murdering Ambepitiya and his bodyguard. All five were sentenced to death by hanging.
