= Maru Sira =

Sri Lankan murderer (1949–1975)

- දෙද්දුවා ජයතුංගලාගේ සිරිපාල
- D.J. Siripala in police custody
- Born: Dedduwa Jayathungalage Siripala; 1948; Pannipitiya, Sri Lanka
- Died: 7 August 1975 (aged 25–26); Bogambara Prison, Kandy, Sri Lanka
- Resting place: Mahaiyawa, Central Province, Sri Lanka
- Other name: D.J. Siripala
- Education: No formal education - early school leaver
- Years active: 1968-1975
- Known for: crimes and his love with Ranmanika
- Children: One daughter
- Status: Executed
- Criminal charge: Murder
- Penalty: Death by hanging

Dedduwa Jayathungalage "D.J." Siripala (Sinhala: දෙද්දුවා ජයතුංගලාගේ සිරිපාල; 1949 – August 7, 1975), also known by the pseudonym Maru Sira (Maru: deadly, Sira: Short form of Siripala), was a Sri Lankan young criminal and bandit active from the late 1960s until the mid 1970s. He was on death row following a conviction for a serial murder. His controversial execution (hanging) led to many debates by creating the popular question "kill by hanging or hang after killing". Siripala achieved fame through several prison escapes while his romance with Ranmanika made his story memorable.

== Early life ==
Siripala was born to a native Sinhala-Buddhist family in Sri Lanka. D.J. David Appuhamai and L. Punchi Nona had seven children; five sons and two daughters. D.J Siripala was the sixth child born in 1948. They lived in Milla Gaha Watta, Liyangoda, Pannipitiya in Colombo District. Liyanagoda was a rural village in the late 1940s, he grew up in a strongly religious family culture. Being a youngster in an extended family Siripala received care from his brothers and sisters; his eldest brother especially took care of his younger brothers and sisters as their father worked away from home. Siripala's father was an attendant in a home for the elderly in Anuradhapura district. Siripala started schooling at Vidyadana Vidyalaya (a small school in his village).

== Debut as a criminal ==
Siripala started his life in Anurdapura Town as a teenage gangster as he lost his family's care. In the late 1950s, Siripala initially made his living as a manual laborer in the Anuradhapura town area. In the mid-1960s, he became a member of a gang in Anuradhapura. The gang was known for juvenile crimes such as looting, pickpocketing and drinking illicit liquor.

== Family life ==
Siripala met Ranmanika in the early 1970s. Ranmanika was a widow with seven children, her husband had died of a snake bite. Ranmanika decided to sell illicit liquor to make her living. Siripala's frequent visits to her liquor cache made an intimacy between them which later turned into a love. Ranmainka (born 1944) was four years older than Siripala. Though they never married, they had a strong relationship as husband and wife. Ranmenika gave birth to Siripala's daughter in 1975. He never knew that Ranmanika was pregnant with his daughter, by the time he had been convicted for a murder and was in the death row. He escaped the prison for the third time to see his daughter who was three days old.

== Death ==
Siripala made his third prison escape successfully three days after his daughter's birth in 1975. His trial was taken up in absentia for murdering a man in March 1974. After the trial, the court prescribed the death penalty. He escaped from prison, but soon afterward prison authorities captured him in a hideout, but he had already visited his newly born daughter. Following his conviction, prison authorities placed him on death row. Siripala was hanged on August 5, 1975, at Bogambara Prison in Kandy.

=== Controversy over Siripala's death ===
On the night before the execution (August 4, 1975), the prison authorities gave Siripala a strong dose of sedatives (Largactil) to prevent another escape attempt and keep him calm. The sedatives caused Siripala to collapse into a state of unconsciousness and lifelessness from which he did not recover. Prison authorities were unable to formally prepare him for the execution. Hence, they carried him to the gallows on a stretcher and laid him on the trapdoor. The noose was then placed around his neck and the executioner (hangman) opened the trapdoor. Due to the shortfall (2 ft. 2 in.) caused by his slumped position, Siripala died from slow strangulation. If he had been standing, he would have died instantly from a cervical fracture. During that prison process of Siripala's execution, Ranmanika who was waiting outside at the prison doors ran along the streets in Kandy city yelling "my husband was killed and hanged".

=== Aftermath ===
News of Siripala's controversial death led to public outrage and controversy. The then president appointed a committee to look into the controversies created by Siripala's death on gallows. His death affected the debate on capital punishment in Sri Lanka.

==== Siripala's skull ====
The Medical Faculty of Ruhuna University keeps Siripala's head as an exhibit. As family members of Siripala mentioned (as of 2021), medical authorities keep his head without the consent of the family members of Siripala. It is believed that his head was removed from his body during the exhumation for the autopsy and judicial-medical purposes following the Presidential Committee, likely in 1976.

== In popular culture ==
=== Siripala and Ranmenika (සිරිපාල සහ රන්මැනිකා) ===
Was a popular Sinhala movie produced in 1978, following the story of Siripala and Ranmanica. It depicts the life events Siripala encounters in his short life.

=== Living with the Killer (Marūwā smaga Wāsē) (මරුවා සමග වාසේ) ===
Living with the Killer/one who makes the death (Marūwā) is the motto Siripala had tattooed on his chest. Marūwā smaga Wāsē' was a popular Sinhala movie produced in 1978. It depicts Siripala's aggressive behavior in terms of his plights and reactions towards what he encounters in his life.

=== Song ===
Popular 1970s Sinhala Baila singer Anton Jones wrote and sang a song that questions the epic death of young Siripala. Song raises the question was he "killed by hanging or hanged after killing". In the present popular social culture this question is used as a slogan, quote in social expressions to insinuate injustice, illegality, or unfairness.

=== Marusira and Sira ===
The terms Maru Sira or Sira have become popular expressions in the contemporary social media. Young generation use these terms to express their feelings or views. These terms are often used regarding social issues, crimes, and anger. The terms are used to communicate social disparity and annoyance. For instance, the term Maru Sira has over 234,000 (as of 2021) entries in the Google search engine. Media platforms such as Facebook have many personal profiles, pages, and groups named Maru Sira or Sira.

| Title | Author | Publisher | Date | Language |
|---|---|---|---|---|
| මරුසිරාගේ කථාව-ලිපි පෙළ (Story of Maru Sira) | Dharamasiri Gamage | Lankadeepa | 1978/09/07 | Sinhala |
