= Administrative courts in Greece =

Greece, as a civil law country has administrative courts. The establishment of those courts can be found in article 94 of the Constitution of the Hellenic Republic 1975, as revised in 2001. The administrative courts are composed from districts Courts of First Instance, district Courts of Appeal and a Supreme Administrative Court that is called the "Council of State". The Council of State is also the Court of first and last instance in some important cases. The Greek administrative courts have jurisdiction upon litigations between the State and the civilians. The most important of them are tax cases, social security cases, tort liability of the State cases, illegal immigration cases etc.
