= Department of Prisons =

Sri Lankan government department

- බන්ධනාගාර දෙපාර්තමේන්තුව

Agency overview
- Formed: 16 July 1905; 121 years ago
- Jurisdiction: Government of Sri Lanka
- Headquarters: Prison Headquarters, 150 Baseline road, Colombo 9; 6.921530°N 79.878140°E
- Motto: Custody, Care, Corrections
- Employees: 6126 (2016)
- Annual budget: Rs 8.6 billion (2016)
- Minister responsible: Harshana Nanayakkara, Ministry of Justice and National Integration
- Agency executive: Thushara Upuldeniya, Commissioner-General of Prisons
- Parent department: Ministry of Justice and National Integration
- Key document: PRISONS ORDINANCE
- Website: www.prisons.gov.lk

The Department of Prisons (Sinhala: බන්ධනාගාර දෙපාර්තමේන්තුව Bandhanagara Departhamenthuwa) is a department of the Government of Sri Lanka responsible for the incarceration and rehabilitation of convicted criminal offenders and terror suspects, coming under the purview of the Ministry of Justice and National Integration. The Commissioner-General of Prisons reports to the Subject Minister, who is in turn responsible to the Parliament of Sri Lanka.

The current Commissioner-General of Prisons is Thushara Upuldeniya.

== History ==
The new prisons system that evolved in Britain was introduced to the British colonies during 1844. The Department of Prisons came into existence first affiliated to the Police Dept. under the then Inspector General of Police Sir George William Robert Campbell under the Act no.18 of 1844. The supervision and control of all prisons in the Island were vested in Inspector General of Prisons. From its inceptions the office of Inspector General of Prisons was held by the Inspector General of Police until 1905 when they separated. Major Albert De Wilton who till then held both offices was appointed Inspector General of Prisons and he was also appointed to be the Superintendent of the Prisons at Welikada, Mutwal and Hultsdorf. In 1922 the penal colony of the Andaman Islands were closed down and 62 life convicts sent back to Ceylon. In 1944 a probation system was introduced as a branch of the Prison Department. In 2022, the Sri Lanka Prisons Emergency Action and Tactical Force was formed under the Prison Department to provide specialist security and riot control within the prison system.

In 2025, the Prisons Department faced a major scandal with issuing of presidential pardons that resulted in the suspension of the Commissioner General of Prisons.

== Responsibilities ==
The Department of Prisons is tasked with ensuring that custodial sentences (imprisonment) and non-custodial sentences and orders (home detention, supervision, community work and release on conditions) imposed by Sri Lankan Courts are administered in a safe, secure, humane and effective way. The Department aims to contribute to the maintenance of a safe and just society by reducing the level of re-offending through the delivery of targeted and appropriate programmes to help offender's rehabilitation and reintegration to society. The Department is also responsible for the transportation of prisoners within the country with the assistance of the Sri Lanka Police.

== Facilities ==
- Prison Headquarters, Colombo
  - Sri Lanka Prisons Emergency Action and Tactical Force
- The Centre for Research and Training in Corrections
- Maximum security prisons - 4
  - Angunakolapelessa Prison (est. 2017)
  - Welikada Prison (est. 1841)
  - Bogambara/Dumbara Prison (est. 2013)
  - Bogambara Prison (est. 1876 - cl. 2014)
  - Mahara Prison (est. 1875)
- Remand Prisons - 18
  - Anuradhapura
  - Batticaloa
  - Badulla
  - Boossa
  - Colombo
  - Galle
  - Kalutara
  - Kegalle
  - Kuruwita
  - Jaffna
  - Matara
  - Monaragala
  - Negombo
  - New Magazine
  - Polonnaruwa
  - Trincomalee
  - Wariyapola
  - Vavuniya
- Work Camps – 10
- Open Prison Camps – 2
  - Anuradhapura Open Prison Camp
  - Pallekele Open Prison Camp
- Correctional Centers for Youthful Offenders – 2
  - Pallansena
  - Taldena
- Training School for Youthful Offenders – 1
  - Watareka
- Work Release Center – 1
- Lock–ups – 23 (prison buildings sited near courts to which prisoners with pending cases are transferred.)

== Ranks ==
=== Officers ===
- Commissioner General of Prisons
- Additional Commissioner General of Prisons
- Commissioner of Prisons
- Deputy Commissioner of Prisons
- Senior Superintendent of Prisons
- Superintendent of Prisons
- Assistant Superintendent of Prisons

=== Jailors ===
- Chief Jailor, Chief Welfare Officer
- Jailor Class 1, Class 1 Welfare Officer
- Jailor Class 2, Class 2 Welfare Officer

=== Guards and other staff ===
- Sergeant
- Guard
- Watcher
- Labour

== Uniform ==
Department of prisons officers, jailers, sergeant and guards wear a khaki uniform similar to that of police officers with the exception of their use of a khaki peak cap.

== See also ==
- Crime in Sri Lanka
- Judiciary of Sri Lanka
- Law of Sri Lanka
- Sri Lanka Prisons Emergency Action and Tactical Force
