= Commander-in-Chief of the Sri Lankan Armed Forces =

Commanding authority of the Sri Lanka Armed Forces

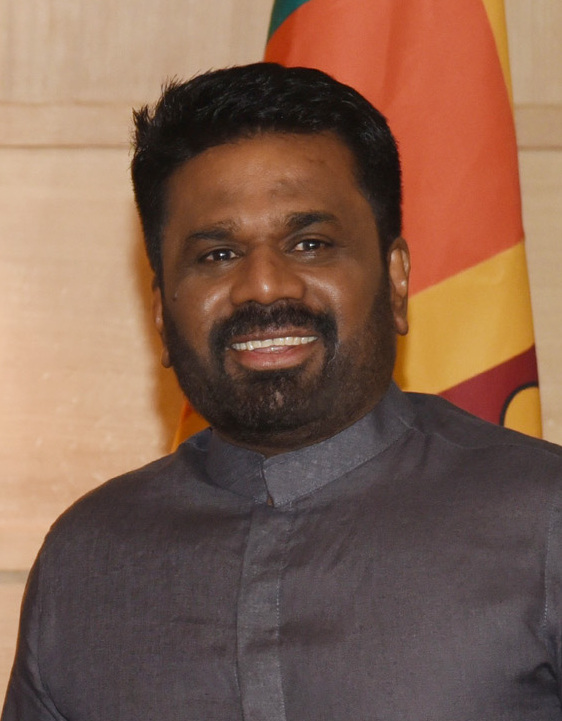
President Anura Kumara Dissanayake (2024).

The Commander-in-Chief of the Sri Lankan Armed Forces (Sinhala: ශ්‍රී ලංකා සන්නද්ධ හමුදාවේ සේනාධිනායක, romanized: śrī laṁkā sannaddha hamudāvē sēnādhināyaka) is the ultimate commanding authority of the Sri Lanka Armed Forces, an executive role vested in the President of Sri Lanka.

== Formation ==
As head of state, the president of Sri Lanka, is nominally the commander-in-chief of the armed forces. The National Security Council, chaired by the president is the authority charged with formulating and executing defence policy for the nation. The highest level of military headquarters is the Ministry of Defence, since 1978 except for a few rare occasions the president retained the portfolio defence, thus being the minister of defence. The ministry and the armed forces have been controlled by the during these periods by either a minister of state, deputy minister for defence, and of recently the permanent secretary to the Ministry of Defence. Prior to 1978 the prime minister held the portfolio of minister of defence and external affairs, and was supported by a parliamentary secretary for defence and external affairs.

Responsibility for the management of the forces is Ministry of Defence, while the planning and execution of combined operations is the responsibility of the Joint Operations Command (JOC). The JOC is headed by the chief of the defence staff who is the most senior officer in the Armed Forces and is an appointment that can be held by an air chief marshal, admiral, or general. The three services have their own respective professional chiefs: the commander of the Army, the commander of the Navy and the commander of the Air Force, who have much autonomy.

== National security council ==
The National Security Council (NSC) of Sri Lanka is the executive body of the Sri Lankan government that is charged with the maintenance of national security with authority to direct the Sri Lankan military and Police. This was established in 1999 during the HE D. B. Wijetunga's government.

=== Participants ===
- Prime Minister
- Minister of Defence
- Minister of Foreign Affairs
- Minister of Finance
- Minister of Law and Order
- Permanent Secretary for the Ministry of Defence
- Permanent Secretary for the Ministry of Foreign Affairs
- Permanent Secretary for the Ministry of Finance
- Permanent Secretary for the Ministry of Law and Order
- Chief of the Defence Staff
- Commander of the Army
- Commander of the Navy
- Commander of the Air Force
- Inspector General of Police
- SIS Director

== See also ==
- List of presidents of Sri Lanka
- Sri Lanka Armed Forces
