= Ideal Motors CATV =

Combat All Terrain Vehicle
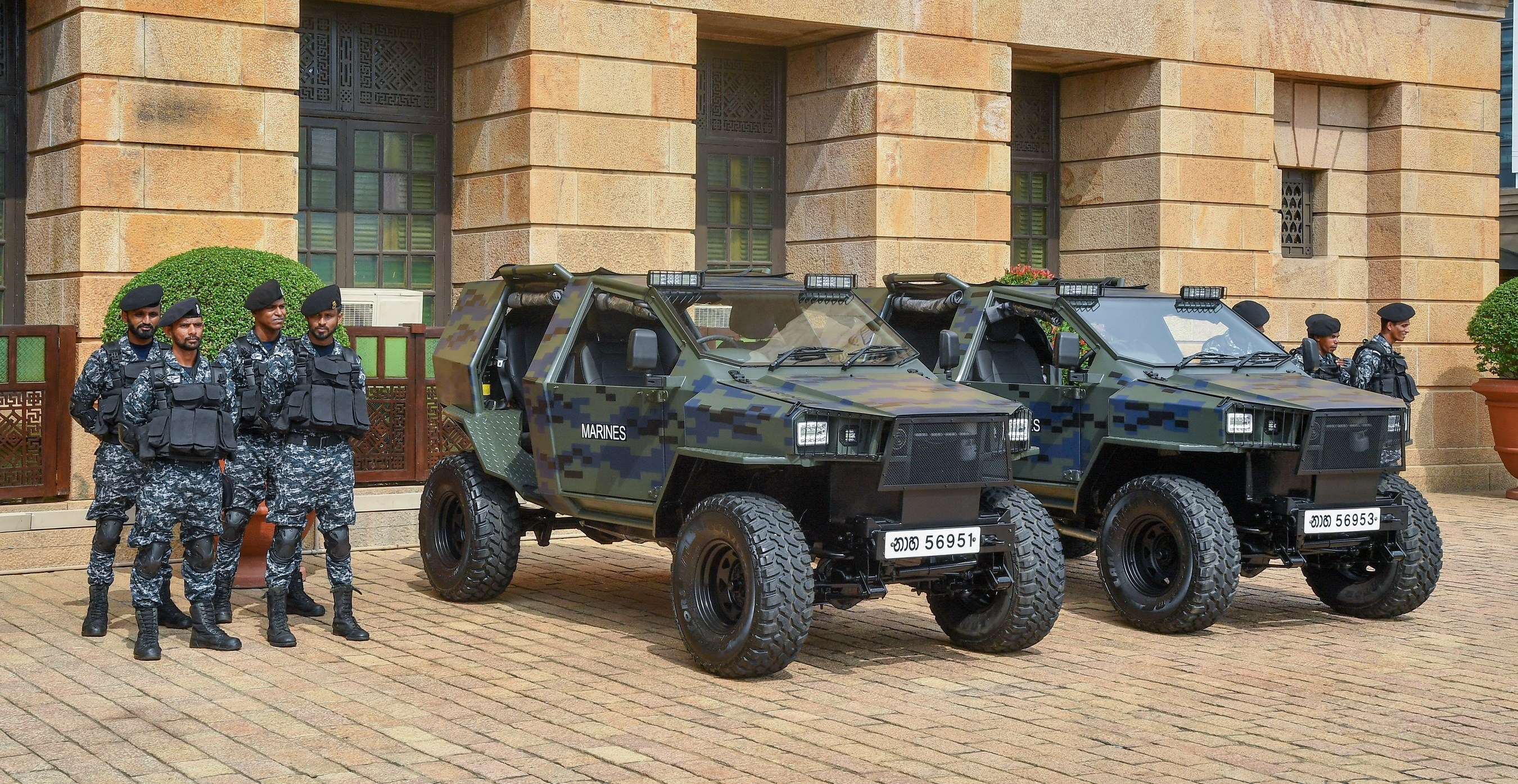
- Type: Military All Terrain Vehicle
- Place of origin: Sri Lanka

Service history
- In service: 2023 – present
- Used by: Sri Lanka Navy

Production history
- Designer: Ideal Motors
- Manufacturer: Ideal Motors
- Unit cost: LKR 8 Million
- Produced: 2023 – present

The Ideal Motors CATV (Combat All Terrain Vehicle) is a Sri Lankan military light utility vehicle produced by the Sri Lankan company Ideal Motors for the Sri Lanka Marine Corps. It was developed jointly by Ideal Motors and the Marines with technical assistance of Mahindra.

== Design ==
The CATV is a 4x4 ATV. The vehicle was designed by Sri Lankan Engineers from Ideal Motors and the Navy. The engine, gear system and the chassis is produced by Mahindra while the rest is fabricated locally reducing costs to LKR 8 million while an imported vehicle would cost LKR 20 million.

== History ==
The first vehicles were provided to the Sri Lanka Navy by Ideal Motors in February 2023 for use of Marines to patrol coastal areas mainly to counter smuggling. Further production of CATVs for other branches of the armed forces was under consideration.

== See also ==
- Polaris RZR
