= Mahara, Sri Lanka =

Mahara
- Town
- Location within Sri Lanka
- Coordinates: 6.991667°N 79.938326°E
- Country: Sri Lanka
- Province: Western Province
- District: Gampaha
- Divisional secretariat: Mahara
- Elevation: 14 m (46 ft)

Population (2024)
  - Total: 20,060
- Postcode: 11851

Mahara (Sinhala: මහාරා) is a town in the Gampaha District in the Western Province in Sri Lanka. It is situated along the A1 highway, approximately 20 km (12 mi) from Colombo.

== History ==
The town initially developed in conjunction with a major rock quarry, from which the gneiss rocks were used to construct the breakwaters at Colombo Harbour. This led to the Colonial government establishing Mahara Prison, a maximum security prison, in 1875, to supply the labour needed to work the quarry.

== Transport ==
In 1864 a railway station, Mahara station, was established on the Main Line, in order to transport the stone from the quarry to the harbour. The station was subsequently renamed Ragama Junction, following the construction of the Puttalam Line in 1908.

The town is located on the A1 Highway, at its junction with the B460 (Wattala - Mahara) road.

== Education ==
- President's College
- Vidyachandra Vidyalaya
- Mahara Nugegoda Dharmaraja Vidyala

== See also ==
- Mahara Prison
- List of football clubs in Sri Lanka
- List of Archaeological Protected Monuments in Sri Lanka
