= Tribunals in Sri Lanka =

The tribunal system of Sri Lanka is part of the national system of administrative justice.

== List of tribunals ==
=== Religious tribunals ===
- Buddhist religious councils - tribunals hearing disciplinary matters pertaining to Buddhist clergy, beyond the purview of the Buddhist Temporalities Ordinance of 1931
- Kathi Court - special tribunal that adjudicates on matrimonial matters relating to Muslims

=== Administrative tribunals ===
- Mediation Boards - under the Mediation Boards Act No. 72 of 1988

==== Employment ====
- Labour Tribunals
- Labor Tribunals under the Wages Board Ordinance
- The Workmen’s Compensation Tribunals
- Board of Appeal under the Factories Ordinance

==== Finance ====
- Inland Revenue Board of Appeal

==== Housing ====
- Ceiling on Housing Property Board of Review
- Rent Board of Review
- Rent Boards

==== Land and agriculture ====
- Tribunals under Agricultural Productivity Law
- Land Acquisition Board of Review
- Agricultural Tribunals

==== Family ====
- Quazis and Boards of Quazis

== See also ==
- List of tribunals in the United Kingdom
- Federal tribunals in the United States
