= Law of Sri Lanka =

The legal system in Sri Lanka comprises collections of codified and uncodified forms of law, of many origins subordinate to the Constitution of Sri Lanka which is the highest law of the island. Its legal framework is a mixture of legal systems of Roman-Dutch law, English law, Kandian law, Thesavalamai and Muslim law. This mixture is a result of the diverse history of the island as a result criminal law is based on English law while much of the common law is Roman-Dutch law, with certain aspects such as marriage, divorce, and inheritance associated with Kandian law, Thesavalamai and Muslim law based on the community and geography.

The Supreme Court of Sri Lanka is the highest court for all criminal and civil cases in Sri Lanka. This is followed by the Court of Appeal, High Court, District Courts, Magistrates' Courts and Primary Court as part of the Sri Lankan judicial system.

== Judicial system ==
Sri Lanka's judiciary consists of;

Courts of law

- Supreme Court of Sri Lanka
- Court of Appeal of Sri Lanka
- High Court of Sri Lanka
- District Courts
- Magistrate's Courts
- Primary Courts

== Legal practitioners ==
There were two types of practitioners; Advocates and Proctors based on English law, while since the implementation of the Justice Law No. 44 of 1973, there are only one type of legal practitioners authorized to represent others in all court of law in the island and are also authorized to give advice regarding any matter of law, known as Attorneys at law. Practitioners are divided between the official bar and unofficial bar.

== See also ==
- Attorney General of Sri Lanka
- Politics of Sri Lanka
