= Mahara Prison =

Maximum security prison in Sri Lanka

Coordinates: 6.9917°N 79.9381°E

- Interactive map of the Mahara Prison area

General information
- Location: Mahara, Sri Lanka
- Construction started: 1875; 151 years ago
- Completed: 1875
- Client: British Government; Sri Lankan Government

Mahara Prison is a maximum security prison, and is one of the largest prisons in Sri Lanka. Situated in the town of Mahara in the Western Province, it was built in 1875 by the British colonial government to ease the congestion at the Slave Island prison. It was used to house the prisoners employed in crushing stones at the Mahara quarry. The stone was used to construct the Port of Colombo and its associated breakwaters. Since its establishment, it has had a police post attached to it. The prison is administered by the Department of Prisons.

== History ==
=== 1902 prison break ===
There was a revolt at the quarry and an escape by 79 inmates around 2:00 pm on 28 June 1902. Prison officers on guard were assaulted and the revolver of the deputy jailor was seized by the riot leader. An army team, headed by Major Bishop and assisted by the jailor, were able to take into custody forty escapees from the neighbourhood. This was the first and the biggest ever escape in the history of the Sri Lanka prisons.

=== 2020 prison riot ===
A riot broke out in the facility on 30 November 2020, resulting in the deaths of eight prisoners. The riot occurred after rumors spread that other Sri Lankan prisons were transferring their prisoners infected with COVID-19 to Mahara.

== Notable inmates ==
- Utuwankande Sura Saradiel - bandit turned Freedom fighter, the Robin Hood of Sri Lanka
- Maradankadawala Yakadaya
- Navarian alias Fancis Fernando
- Cutex Piyadasa
- Keragala Siresana alias cheena
- Watareka Jayasundara
- Gampaha Munidasa
- Tharushi Ranabahu
