= Muslim law in Sri Lanka =

Muslim law in Sri Lanka is one of three customary laws which is applicable to Sri Lankans who are Muslims by virtue of birth and conversion to Islam. The other two customary laws are Kandyan law and Thesavalamai. It is different from Islamic law and governs aspects of marriage, divorce custody and maintenance, having been included in the Act No. 13 of 1951 Marriage and Divorce (Muslim) Act, the Act No. 10 of 1931 Muslim Intestate Succession Ordinance and the Act No. 51 of 1956 Muslim Mosques and Charitable Trusts or Wakfs Act.

== Criticism ==
=== Underage marriages ===
The Sri Lankan Muslim law has been criticized as it allows the marriage of Muslim girls under the age of 18, which is the common legal marriage age. Activists have called on amending the laws.

=== Polygamy ===
Polygamy is allowed under sections 24 (1)- 24 (4) of the Muslim Marriage and Divorce Act of 1951. As such a man can marry up to four women, provided that he can treat them equally.
