= Mohan Peiris =

De facto Chief Justice of Sri Lanka from 2013 to 2015 and diplomat

Mohan Peiris PC
- මොහාන් පීරිස්
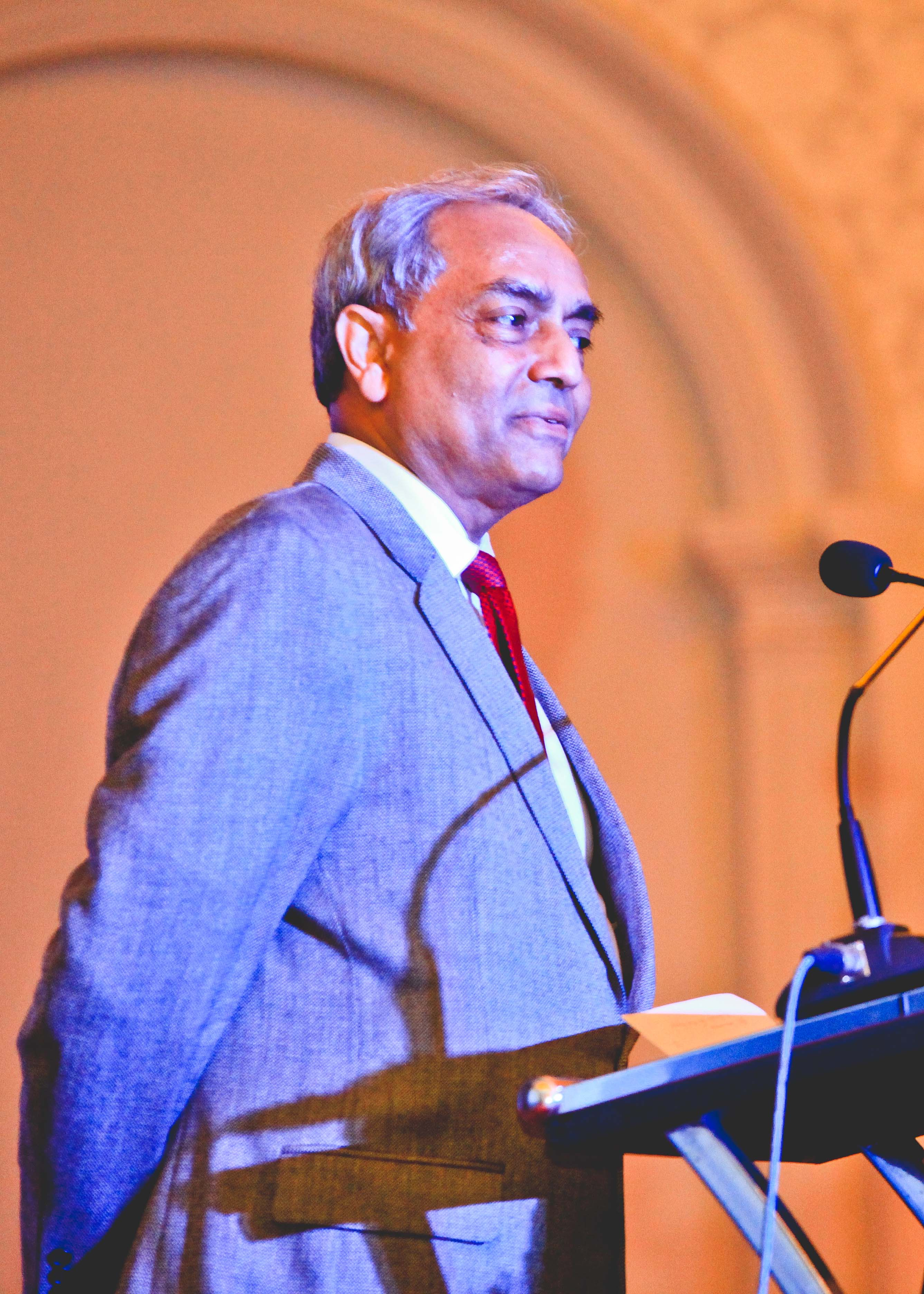

De facto Chief Justice of Sri Lanka
- In office 15 January 2013 – 28 January 2015
- Appointed by: Mahinda Rajapaksa
- Preceded by: Shirani Bandaranayake
- Succeeded by: Shirani Bandaranayake

41st Attorney General of Sri Lanka
- In office 2008–2011
- Appointed by: Mahinda Rajapaksa
- Preceded by: C. R. De Silva
- Succeeded by: Shanthi Eva Wanasundera

Personal details
- Spouse: Priyanthi Peiris
- Children: Talia Peiris
- Education: St. Joseph's College, Colombo; Royal College Colombo; Sri Lanka Law College
- Profession: Attorney-at-law

Peter Mohan Maithree Peiris, PC (Sinhala: පීටර් මොහාන් මෙෙත්‍රී පීරිස්) is a Sri Lankan lawyer and diplomat. He served as the Attorney General of Sri Lanka from 2008 to 2011 and was the de facto Chief Justice of Sri Lanka from 2013 to 2015 when President Maithripala Sirisena declared his appointment void ab initio in 2015. He has been serving as the Permanent Representative of Sri Lanka to the United Nations since January 2021 and was elected Vice President of the 78th session of the United Nations General Assembly in June 2023.

== Education ==
Peiris was educated at St. Joseph's College, Colombo and Royal College, Colombo. He played cricket for both schools.

== Legal career ==
Following his schooling, Peiris entered the Sri Lanka Law College for his legal studies and was called to the bar on 19 June 1975 as an Attorney-at-law and became a Solicitor of the Courts of England and Wales in 1978. He started his legal practice working under senior lawyers Daya Perera and D. R. P. Gunatilleke after qualifying.

=== Attorney General's Department ===
Peiris joined the Attorney General's Department in 1981 as a state counsel, later becoming a senior state counsel. During this time he was trained at the National Institute of Trial Advocacy of the Harvard Law School, at the Centre for Police and Criminal Justice Studies of the Jesus College, Cambridge and at George Washington University. He left the Attorney General's Department in 1996.

=== Unofficial Bar ===
After leaving the Attorney General's Department, he joined the unofficial bar engaging in private practice. He practiced in the original and appellate courts and specialized in areas of administrative law, commercial law, land law, fundamental rights and industrial law.

=== Attorney General ===
Peiris was appointed Attorney General on 18 December 2008 from the unofficial bar. He withdrew murder charges in a case against former deputy minister Chandana Kathriarachchi and served an indictment on unlawful assembly for which the accused pleaded guilty. Furthermore, he withdrew a rape case against Government Party Parliamentarian Duminda Silva.

Peiris was appointed senior legal officer to the Cabinet in September 2011. He became Chairman of Seylan Bank in April 2012.

He represented Sri Lanka in The UN Committee Against Torture in 2011 in which he said that the Sri Lankan Government has received intelligence information that missing lankaeNews cartoonist Prageeth Ekneligoda is living in a foreign country. However, he concurred that he lied when he was summoned by a local court.

=== Chief justice ===
Peiris was nominated to be Chief Justice by President Mahinda Rajapaksa following the controversial impeachment of Shirani Bandaranayake. The Parliamentary Council gave its approval for Peiris's appointment on 15 January 2013. Peiris was sworn in as chief justice on 15 January 2013. Peiris was officially inaugurated as chief justice at a ceremony in the Supreme Court on 23 January 2013. The media, other than the state-owned media, were banned from the ceremony which was boycotted by the Bar Association of Sri Lanka (BASL), the largest lawyers association in the country. The ceremony was however attended by other judges including the associate judges of the Supreme Court.

Peiris' appointment drew some criticism. Peiris is considered to be an ally of President Rajapaksa and his appointment was seen by critics as further consolidation of power by the president and his family. United Nations High Commissioner for Human Rights Navi Pillay expressed doubts about Peiris' independence and impartiality, particularly when dealing with allegations of serious human rights violations by the Sri Lankan government. The International Commission of Jurists condemned Peiris' appointment, describing it as a "further assault on the independence of the judiciary".

Maithripala Sirisena, the president elected on 8 January 2015, refused to take oaths before him on the basis his appointment was illegal and took oaths before Justice Hon. K. Sripavan, the most senior judge of the Supreme Court.

According to Sirisena, Mohan Peiris visited him several times begging not to remove him and promising to deliver judgements according to his wishes.

On 28 January 2015, the Government of Sri Lanka acknowledged that the appointment of Mohan Peiris as the chief justice was void at its inception as Dr. Shirani Bandaranayake was not impeached lawfully and therefore, no vacancy existed for the post of chief justice. That paved the way for Dr. Shirani Bandaranayake to resume duties as the chief justice of Sri Lanka.

== Later work ==
Peiris was appointed the Permanent Representative of Sri Lanka to the United Nations in January 2021 by President Gotabaya Rajapaksa. In 2022, he was elected chair of the First Committee (Disarmament and International Security) replacing Magzhan Ilyassov. He was elected Vice President of the 78th session of the United Nations General Assembly in June 2023.

== Family ==
Peiris's wife Priyanthi is also an attorney-at-law. Their teenage daughter Talia died in July 2002. Peiris is a Roman Catholic and is a worshipper at All Saints' Church, Borella.

== See also ==
- Sri Lankan Non Career Diplomats

Legal offices
Preceded by Shirani Bandaranayake	Chief Justice of Sri Lanka; 2013-2015	Succeeded by Shirani Bandaranayake
Preceded by Chitta De Silva	Attorney General of Sri Lanka; 2008–2011	Succeeded by Eva Wansundera
Preceded by A.L.A. Azeez	Permanent Representative to the United Nations; 2021–Present	Succeeded by
