= Kulatunga =

Kulatunga (Sinhala: කුලතුංග, romanized: Kulatunga) is a Sinhalese surname. Notable people with the surname include:

- Gihan Kulatunga, Sri Lankan puisne justice of the Supreme Court
- Jeevantha Kulatunga (born 1973), Sri Lankan cricketer
- Jeewaka Ruwan Kulatunga, Sri Lankan general
- K. M. M. B. Kulatunga (died 2010), Sri Lankan puisne justice of the Supreme Court
- Parami Kulatunga (1951–2006), Sri Lanka Army general
- Vimukthi Kulatunga (born 1998), Sri Lankan cricketer
- Ranjeewa Kulatunga(1969-2024), a globally recognized Sri Lankan human resources leader and leadership development expert.
