= Victor Tennekoon =

Chief Justice of Sri Lanka from 1974 to 1977

Victor Tennekoon QC

35th Chief Justice of Sri Lanka
- In office 1 January 1974 – 8 September 1977
- Appointed by: William Gopallawa
- Preceded by: Gardiye Punchihewage Amaraseela Silva
- Succeeded by: Neville Samarakoon

Judge of the Court of Appeal of Sri Lanka
- In office 2 August 1973 – 31 December 1973
- Appointed by: William Gopallawa

33rd Attorney General of Sri Lanka
- In office 1 July 1970 – 1973
- Appointed by: Sirimavo Bandaranaike
- Preceded by: Abdul Caffoor Mohamad Ameer
- Succeeded by: Shiva Pasupati

112th Puisne Justice of the Supreme Court of Sri Lanka
- In office 8 February 1967 – 1 July 1970
- Appointed by: Dudley Senanayake

23rd Solicitor General of Ceylon
- In office 1965–1967
- Appointed by: Dudley Senanayake
- Preceded by: Anthony Alles
- Succeeded by: Walter Jayawardena

Personal details
- Born: 9 September 1914 Rambukkana, Central Province, British Ceylon
- Died: April 1990
- Spouse(s): Semitha Tennekoon, née Wijewardene
- Children: Asita, Dayanthi and Priyani
- Education: University of London; Ceylon Law College

Victor Tennekoon QC (9 September 1914 – April 1990) was a Sri Lankan lawyer and jurist. He served as the 35th Chief Justice of Sri Lanka, as well as the 33rd Attorney General and 23rd Solicitor General. From 1979 to 1984 Tennekoon served as Chancellor of the University of Peradeniya.

== Early life and education ==
Born on 9 September 1914 in the Central Province of British Ceylon, he had four brothers; Herbert Tennekoon, former Governor of the Central Bank of Sri Lanka; Reginald Tennekoon, member of parliament for Minipe; George Tennekoon, Professor of Pathology, University of Peradeniya and Kenneth Tennekoon, an engineer who emigrated to the UK in 1956 and one sister Dulcie Wijenaike.

He received his education at St. Anthony's College, Kandy; gained a Bachelor of Arts degree from the University of London and subsequently entered the Ceylon Law College. He was called to the Bar on 4 May 1943 as an Advocate.

== Legal career ==
Tennekoon started his legal practice in the unofficial bar in Kegalle and was appointed a Temporary Additional Crown Counsel on 1 October 1946 in the Attorney-General's Department. From 14 March 1949 to 5 March 1951, he was seconded to serve as the Secretary to the Kandyan Peasantry Commission. In September 1949 he was appointed Crown Counsel; in November 1955, he was appointed Acting Senior Crown Counsel and in May 1956 confirmed as Senior Crown Counsel. Between April 1957 and June 1961, he served as Acting Deputy Solicitor General. Although he specialized in civil law, he attended Columbia University on a senior fellowship in constitutional law from the Asia Foundation between September 1961 to March 1962 and on his return joined the Attorney-General's prosecution team in the 1962 coup d'état attempt. Appointed Solicitor General of Ceylon in 1964 he played a key role formulating the Sirima–Shastri Pact working as an advisor to the government on aspects of international law relating to the nationality problems of Indian Tamils of Sri Lanka in collaboration with Sir Humphrey Waldock. In 1965 he took silks as a Queen's Counsel. In 1967, he was appointed to the Supreme Court of Ceylon as a Puisne Justice. He was the first Kandyan to serve in the Supreme Court bench, serving from 8 February 1967 to 1 July 1970.

In July 1970, he was appointed Attorney General. During his term, he created the controversial Criminal Justice Commission to prosecute a large number of suspects of the 1971 JVP insurrection, which was later extended to prosecute exchange control violators. Reaching the public service retirement age of 60, he was appointed a Judge of the Court of Appeal of Sri Lanka in August 1973 and served till 31 December 1973. On 1 January 1974 he was appointed Chief Justice, succeeding Gardiye Punchihewage Amaraseela Silva and served till his retirement on 8 September 1977.

== Later work ==
Following his retirement, Tennekoon served in many capacities. He served as the Chairman of the Presidential Commission on Development Councils from 1977 to 1980; Law Commission, the Salaries Review Committee, LB Finance Company, the Central Hospitals Ltd, and Deputy Chairman of the Commercial Bank of Ceylon. In 1984 he chaired the Ministry of Justice Law's Delays seminar and the Committee on the Courts of Appeal.

Tennekoon served as Chancellor of the University of Peradeniya from 1979 to 1984, he was conferred the honorary degree of Doctor of Laws (LL.D.) honoris causa by the university. He was conferred the national honour of the title of Deshamanya in the first ever Independence Day National Honours list in 1986.

== Family ==
Tennekoon was married to Semitha Wijewardena, niece of Don Richard Wijewardena. They had son Asita and two daughters Dayanthi and Priyani.

Legal offices
Preceded by Gardiye Punchihewage Amaraseela Silva	Chief Justice of Sri Lanka; 1974-1977	Succeeded by Neville Samarakoon
Preceded by	Judge of the Court of Appeal of Sri Lanka; 1973-1973	Succeeded by
Preceded by Abdul Caffoor Mohamad Ameer	Attorney General of Sri Lanka; 1970-1973	Succeeded by Shiva Pasupati
Preceded by	Puisne Justice of the Supreme Court of Sri Lanka; 1967-1970	Succeeded by
Preceded by Anthony Alles	Solicitor General of Ceylon; 1965-1967	Succeeded by Walter Jayawardena
