= Reginald Tennekoon =

Sri Lankan politician (born 1912)

Hon. Reginald Tennekoon

Member of the Ceylon Parliament for Minipe
- In office 1960–1965
- Preceded by: M. B. W. Mediwake
- Succeeded by: H. M. Navaratne

Personal details
- Born: Reginald Wilfred Tennekoon; 31 December 1912 Rambukkana, Ceylon
- Party: United National Party
- Spouse: Muriel née Rambukpotha
- Relations: L. B. Tennekoon (father); Nandumanika née Rambukwelle
- Children: one
- Education: St. Anthony's College, Kandy; Ceylon University College
- Occupation: public servant, politician, businessman

Reginald Wilfred Tennekoon (born 31 December 1912) was a Ceylonese politician and businessman.

Tennekoon was born on 31 December 1912 in the Central Province of British Ceylon, the son of L. B. Tennekoon and Nandumanika Rambukwelle Tennakoon Kumarihamy of Walgama Walauwa, Rambukkana. He had four brothers; Victor Tennekoon, Chief Justice of Sri Lanka (1974-1977); Herbert Tennekoon, the Governor of the Central Bank of Ceylon (1971-1979); George Tennekoon, Professor of Pathology, University of Peradeniya and Kenneth Tennekoon, an engineer who emigrated to the UK in 1956 and one sister Dulcie Wijenaike. He was educated at St. Anthony's College, Kandy, from where he attended Ceylon University College in 1930, obtaining a BA (Lon.) in 1933. He then attended the Ceylon Law College, graduating as an Advocate. He practiced for a number of years in Kandy before joining the Ceylon Civil Service with the Department of Lands.

In 1943 he married Muriel Rambukpotha (1919-1978), the daughter of Albert Rambukpotha Rate Mahatmaya. They had one child, a daughter.

In 1956, encouraged by his maternal uncle, Herath Banda Rambukwella, the sitting member for Minipe, he resigned from his position as Assistant Settlement Officer and ran as the United National Party candidate, at the 3rd parliamentary election, in the Minipe electorate. He was unsuccessful, losing by 4,648 votes to the Sri Lanka Freedom Party candidate, M. B. W. Mediwake. Tennekoon ran again at the 4th parliamentary election, held on 19 March 1960, winning the seat narrowly by 438 votes. The election results however left neither of Ceylon's two major parties with a majority, with the result being the calling of another election. He was subsequently re-elected at the 5th parliamentary election held on 20 July 1960. Again it was a tight contest with Tennekoon receiving 4,833 votes (52.5% of the total vote) and 540 votes ahead of the Sri Lanka Freedom Party candidate, H. M. Navaratne. He did not contest the next parliamentary election in 1965.

Tennekoon went on to serve on a number of boards, including as the chairman of the Agricultural and Industrial Credit Corporation of Ceylon.
