= Sanjay Rajaratnam =

Attorney General of Sri Lanka from 2021 to 2024

The Honorable Sanjay Rajaratnam PC

48th Attorney General of Sri Lanka
- In office 26 May 2021 – 26 June 2024
- Appointed by: Gotabaya Rajapaksa
- Preceded by: Dappula de Livera
- Succeeded by: Parinda Ranasinghe Jr.

47th Solicitor General of Sri Lanka
- In office October 2019 – 26 May 2021
- Appointed by: Gotabaya Rajapaksa
- Preceded by: Dilrukshi Dias Wickramasinghe
- Succeeded by: Indika Demuni de Silva

Personal details
- Citizenship: Sri Lankan
- Parent: Sivakumaran Rajaratnam (Advocate) (father)
- Education: Royal College Colombo; St Peters College Colombo
- Alma mater: Sri Lanka Law College; Queen Mary University of London
- Occupation: Lawyer
- Profession: Attorney-At-Law

Sanjay Rajaratnam, PC is a Sri Lankan lawyer. He is the former Attorney General of Sri Lanka. He previously served as the Acting Solicitor General of Sri Lanka from October 2019 up until May 2021.

== Family and education ==
Sanjay Rajaratnam's father, Sivakumaran Rajaratnam, was an Advocate who took oaths in 1955, and his grandfather was Duraiappah Rajaratnam MBE, a Crown Proctor from Trincomalee, who was also the first Chairman of the Trincomalee Urban Council.

Rajaratnam received his primary and secondary education at the St. Peter's College, Bambalapitiya and Royal College, Colombo He then entered the Sri Lanka Law College and qualified as an attorney-at-law. Rajaratnam also received an LL.M. from the Queen Mary University of London and qualified as a solicitor.

== Legal career ==
He joined the Attorney General's Department in April 1988 as a State Counsel. He was later promoted as Senior State Counsel, and then Deputy Solicitor General. In 2014, he was appointed as the President's Counsel by the then Sri Lankan President Mahinda Rajapaksa.

In October 2019, he replaced Dilrukshi Dias Wickramasinghe as the acting solicitor general following the latter's leaked controversial phone call with Avant Garde chairman.

On 20 May 2021, the Parliamentary Council approved the appointment of Sanjay Rajaratnam to the position of Attorney General of Sri Lanka replacing Dappula de Livera.

Legal offices
Preceded by Dilrukshi Dias	Solicitor General of Sri Lanka; 2019–2021	Succeeded by Indika Demuni de Silva
Preceded by Dappula de Livera	Attorney General of Sri Lanka; 2021–2024	Succeeded by Parinda Ranasinghe Jr.
