= Priyantha Jayawardena =

Sri Lankan judge

Priyantha Jayawardena PC

Puisne Justice of the Supreme Court of Sri Lanka
- Incumbent
- Assumed office 7 May 2014

Personal details
- Education: Nalanda College Colombo; Sri Lanka Law College; University of Aberdeen

Priyantha Jayawardena is a sitting Judge of the Puisne Justice of the Supreme Court of Sri Lanka.

== Education and early career ==
After receiving primary and secondary education at Nalanda College Colombo. While at Nalanda he excelled in studies and rugger playing for the college rugger team. Later he entered Sri Lanka Law College and was enrolled as an attorney-at-law of the Supreme Court in 1988 and served as a research assistant to the late Mark Fernando and late P. Ramanathan.

== Legal career ==
In 1994 after pursuing a master's degree in commercial law from the University of Aberdeen United Kingdom and returning to Sri Lanka he joined Attorney-General's Department as a state counsel. During his time in the UK having completed Qualified Lawyers' Transfer Test he was enrolled as a Solicitor of the Courts of England and Wales.

Later after serving as a private legal practitioner in labour law, commercial law and public and constitutional law for nearly a decade Jayawardena, was appointed a President's Counsel by the president and called to the inner bar in 2012.

He was also a visiting lecturer of commercial law at the University of Moratuwa (Department of Building Economics).

Jayawardena serves as board member, director, legal consultant for many government organisations and private sector institutes.
