= Raja Wanasundera =

Sri Lankan judge

Raja Wanasundera PC

Puisne Justice of the Supreme Court of Sri Lanka
- In office 5 June 1975 – ?

27th Solicitor General of Sri Lanka
- In office 1972–1974
- President: William Gopallawa
- Preceded by: Hector Deheragoda
- Succeeded by: Shiva Pasupati

Personal details
- Born: 11 February 1924 Ratnapura, Sabaragamuwa, British Ceylon
- Died: 31 October 2012 (aged 88)
- Relations: S. R. Wijayatilake (brother in law); Yuwanjana Wijayatilake (nephew)
- Education: University College, Colombo; Ceylon Law College; University of London; Stanford University

Raja Sirimevan Wanasundera PC (11 February 1924 - 31 October 2012) was a Sri Lankan judge who served as a Puisne Justice of the Supreme Court of Sri Lanka and the 27th Solicitor General of Sri Lanka.

== Early life, education and family ==
Raja Wanasundera was born in Ratnapura on 11 February 1924 to a Kandyan family. He is a descendant of Ehelepola Nilame. Wanasundera attended Royal College, Colombo. He obtained a Bachelor of Arts from the University College Colombo and pursued legal studies upon entering the Law College. He is also a graduate of the University of London and has completed postgraduate courses in International Law and Constitutional Law at Stanford University.

Former Justice S. R. Wijayatilake was Wanasundera's brother in law, and uncle to his son former Attorney General Yuwanjana Wijayatilake.

Raja Wanasundera died in the early hours of 31 October 2012.

== Legal career ==
Wanasundera was called to the Bar on 27 April 1947. He served his apprenticeship in the chambers of N. E. Weerasooria, K.C. He served as an Acting Crown Counsel from January 1952 and was appointed Crown Counsel on 29 March 1954. He was promoted to Solicitor General, succeeding Hector Deheragoda, and held the office until 1974. He was succeeded by Shiva Pasupati. He also acted as Attorney General in 1973. On the 5 June 1975 he was appointed to the bench of the Supreme Court. As a Puisne Justice of the Supreme Court he has on several occasions acted as Acting Chief Justice.

With the stepping down of Chief Justice Suppiah Sharvananda, Wanasundera, the senior most judge on the bench, was passed over as his successor when President J. R. Jayewardene appointed Justice Parinda Ranasinghe as his replacement. Justice Wanasundera had previously given a dissenting judgment against the government. The Sri Lanka Bar Association deplored this appointment.

Legal offices
Preceded by Hector Deheragoda	Solicitor General of Sri Lanka; 1972–1974	Succeeded by Shiva Pasupati
