= General Silva =

General Silva may refer to:

- Gratian Silva (1933–2015), Sri Lankan Army major general
- Henry Rangel Silva (born 1961), Venezuelan Armed Forces general-in-chief
- Lucius Flavius Silva (fl. late 1st century), Roman general
- Shavendra Silva (fl. 1980s–2020s), Sri Lanka Army general

== See also ==
- Attorney General Silva (disambiguation)
