= Rambukwella (surname) =

Rambukwella is a surname. Notable people with this surname include:

- H. B. Rambukwella (1885–1961), Ceylonese politician
- Keheliya Rambukwella (born 1954), Sri Lankan politician
- Prageeth Rambukwella (born 1976), Sri Lankan cricketer
- Ramith Rambukwella (born 1991), Sri Lankan cricketer
