= Herbert Tennekoon =

Former governor of the Central Bank of Ceylon

Herbert Tennekoon CCS
- Born: 30 September 1911
- Died: 22 January 1979 (aged 67)
- Known for: Governor of the Central Bank of Ceylon
- Relatives: Bothers: Victor Tennekoon; Reginald Tennekoon

Herbert Ernest Tennekoon, CCS (30 September 1911 - 22 January 1979) was a Sri Lankan civil servant. He was the Governor of the Central Bank of Ceylon.

Born in the Central Province of British Ceylon, he had four brothers; Victor Tennekoon, former Chief Justice of Sri Lanka; Reginald Tennekoon, member of parliament for Minipe; George Tennekoon, Professor of Pathology, University of Peradeniya and Kenneth Tennekoon, an engineer who emigrated to the UK in 1956 and one sister Dulcie Wijenaike.

Educated at St. Anthony's College, Kandy; he gained a honours degree in history at the Ceylon University College. He joined the Ceylon Civil Service and served in the General Treasury and functioned as Secretary to the Treasury and Permanent Secretary to the Ministry of External Affairs and Defence. In 1964, he was appointed special advisor on trade and development for the executive secretary of the General Agreement on Tariffs and Trade (GATT) in Geneva. He thereafter served as Ceylon's Ambassador to Japan. He returned to Ceylon in July 1971 on appointment as Governor of the Central Bank of Ceylon by Prime Minister Sirima Bandaranaike succeeding William Tennekoon. He died suddenly while in office on 22 January 1979 in Singapore attending a SEACEN Governors’ Conference.

== See also ==
- Sri Lankan Non Career Diplomats
