= Lucien Macull Dominic de Silva =

Ceylonese lawyer and judge (1893–1962)

The Right Honourable Lucien Macull Dominic de Silva QC

Puisne Justice of the Supreme Court of Ceylon
- In office 1933–1934

Personal details
- Born: 25 April 1893 Ceylon
- Died: 28 November 1962 (aged 69) Willow Brook, Hassocks, Sussex, England
- Education: Royal College, Colombo, Trinity College, Kandy, St John's College, Cambridge
- Profession: Barrister

Lucien Macull Dominic de Silva, QC, PC (25 April 1893 – 28 November 1962) was a Ceylonese lawyer and judge, who was a Solicitor General of Ceylon, sat on the Supreme Court of Ceylon and the Judicial Committee of the Privy Council.

== Education ==
Born in Ceylon to G. de Silva. De Silva was educated at Royal College, Colombo, Trinity College, Kandy, and entered St John's College, Cambridge in 1911. He graduated in 1914 with a BA in Mathematical Tripos.

== Legal career ==
He was called to the English Bar as a barrister in 1916 from the Gray's Inn. On his return to he enrolled as an advocate and started his legal practice in the unofficial bar. He was appointed Solicitor-General for Ceylon in 1931, serving till 1934 and was appointed a Ceylonese King's Counsel in 1932. In 1932, he served briefly acting Attorney General for Ceylon. In 1933, he was appointed Puisne Justice of the Supreme Court of Ceylon. He retired from the service of the government of Ceylon in 1934. In 1938 he was appointed an English King's Counsel in 1932.

He was appointed chairman of the Commission to Enquire into Bribery, State Council, Ceylon from 1941 to 1943, which found several elected members of State Council of Ceylon has accepted bribes, resulting in their removal from the State Council. He thereafter served as the chairman of the Commission to enquire into Law relating to Mortgage, Credit Facilities and Protection of Lands of Agriculturists, Ceylon, 1943–45; chairman, Delimitation Commission, Ceylon, 1946. He was Ceylon's delegate to the Commonwealth Conference on Citizenship, 1947; chairman, Commission to enquire into Law Relating to Companies, Ceylon, 1948; Ceylon Delegate, Commonwealth Relations Conference, Canada, 1949.

In 1951, the Ceylon government decided to seek the appointment of a semi-permanent judge from the island to the Judicial Committee of the Privy Council, and de Silva was selected to fill the vacancy. For tax reasons, on 1 October 1952, de Silva was appointed a judge of the Supreme Court of Ceylon. In January 1953, de Silva reached London and began to sit on the Judicial Committee.

De Silva became a Bencher of Gray's Inn and was elected an honorary fellow of St John's College, Cambridge in 1956.

He married Anne Edwards, daughter of George G. Edwards, of Liandrinio, Montgomeryshire in 1930. They had no children. He died on 28 November 1962 following a brief illness at his home in Willow Brook, Hassocks, Sussex.

Legal offices
Preceded by Stanley Obeysekere	Solicitor General of Ceylon; 1932–1935	Succeeded by J. W. R. Illangakoon
