= R. R. Crossette-Thambiah =

R. R. Crossette-Thambiah KC

18th Solicitor General of Sri Lanka
- In office 1950–1951
- Governor General: Herwald Ramsbotham
- Preceded by: M. F. S. Pulle
- Succeeded by: T. S. Fernando

Personal details
- Born: February 2, 1897
- Education: St. John's College, Jaffna
- Profession: Lawyer
- Ethnicity: Ceylon Tamil

Robert Rasiah Crossette-Thambiah was a leading Ceylon Tamil lawyer and Solicitor General.

== Early life and family ==
Crossette-Thambiah was born on 2 February 1897. He was the son of T. H. Crossette, principal of St. John's College, Jaffna. He was educated at the St. John's College.

Crossette-Thambiah married Amy Ranita, daughter of S. C. Paul.

== Career ==
Crossette-Thambiah taught at St. John's College for a few years before joining the legal profession. He was called to the bar at Middle Temple on 5 October 1925. He was an advocate of the Supreme Court. He joined the Attorney-General's Department in 1926 as an Additional Crown Counsel. He was promoted to Crown Counsel, Senior Crown Counsel, District Judge and Public Trustee (1945). He was then Commissioner of Assize for four years. He became a King's Counsel in 1949. He was Solicitor General between 1950 and 1951.
