= Abdul Caffoor Mohamad Ameer =

Sri Lankan lawyer (1914-1997)

Abdul Caffoor Mohamed Ameer QC

32nd Attorney General of Ceylon
- In office 1966–1970
- Governor General: William Gopallawa
- Preceded by: Douglas St. Clive Budd Jansze
- Succeeded by: Victor Tennekoon

Personal details
- Born: 1 November 1914 Veyangalla, Kalutara District, Sri Lanka
- Died: May 1997 (aged 82)
- Resting place: Colombo, Sri Lanka
- Spouse: Rahila
- Children: Fazl, Farook, Shireen, Yasmin, Shiraz
- Education: Queens' College, Cambridge
- Profession: Barrister at Law

Deshamanya Abdul Caffoor Mohamed Ameer, QC (1 November 1914 – May 1997) was a Sri Lankan lawyer. He was the 32nd Attorney General of Ceylon. He was appointed in 1966, succeeding Douglas St. Clive Budd Jansze, and held the office until 1970. He was succeeded by Victor Tennekoon.

Ameer attended Queens' College, Cambridge, gaining a MA and was called to the bar as a barrister from the Inner Temple. On his return to Ceylon, he was enrolled as an advocate in 1940. He joined the Attorney General's Department as a Temporary Additional Crown Counsel on 1 October 1947. On 1 March 1949 he was confirmed as a Crown Counsel.

He was involved in leading the prosecution of Talduwe Somarama Thero in the trial of the Bandaranaike assassination in 1960. He resigned in protest from the post of Deputy Solicitor General when George E. Chitty, QC of the unofficial bar was retained by the government to lead the prosecution against the appeals of the three convicts of the assassination in the Court of Criminal Appeal. After a successful stint in the unofficial bar, he was appointed by Dudley Senanayake's government to the post of Attorney General in 1966 following an alleged attempted coup d'état. He was appointed a Queen's Counsel and in December 1969 addressed the 681st Special Political Committee meeting at the 24th session of the United Nations General Assembly in New York on the Palestinian problem. He was conferred the national honour of the title of Deshamanya in 1991 the first-ever Independence Day National Honours list created in 1986. Former minister M. L. M. Aboosally was his brother-in-law.

Legal offices
Preceded by Douglas St. Clive Budd Jansze	Attorney General of Ceylon; 1966–1970	Succeeded by Victor Tennekoon
