= Suhada Gamlath =

Sri Lankan lawyer

Suhada Gamlath PC

Temporary Attorney General of Sri Lanka
- In office 10 January 2016 – 11 February 2016
- Appointed by: Maithripala Sirisena
- Preceded by: Yuwanjana Wijayatilake
- Succeeded by: Jayantha Jayasuriya

44th Solicitor General of Sri Lanka
- In office 2 February 2015 – February 2018
- Appointed by: Maithripala Sirisena
- Preceded by: Yuwanjana Wijayatilake
- Succeeded by: Dappula de Livera

Personal details
- Education: Royal College; Sri Lanka Law College
- Occupation: Lawyer
- Profession: Attorney-At-Law

Suhada Gamlath PC is a Sri Lankan lawyer. He was the 44th Solicitor General of Sri Lanka and temporarily the Attorney General of Sri Lanka from January to February 2016. He was a former Permanent Secretary to the Ministry of Justice and Law Reforms. He was educated at Royal College Colombo and at the Sri Lanka Law College.

Legal offices
Preceded by Yuwanjana Wijayatilake	Solicitor General of Sri Lanka; 2015–2018	Succeeded by Dappula de Livera
Preceded by Yuwanjana Wijayatilake	Attorney General of Sri Lanka; 2016 – 2016	Succeeded by Jayantha Jayasuriya
