= Parinda Ranasinghe Jr. =

Attorney General of Sri Lanka since 2024

The Honourable Parinda Ranasinghe Jr. PC

49th Attorney General of Sri Lanka
- Incumbent
- Assumed office 12 July 2024
- Appointed by: Ranil Wickremesinghe
- Preceded by: Sanjay Rajaratnam

Acting Attorney General
- In office 1 July 2024 – 12 July 2024
- Appointed by: Ranil Wickremesinghe

Personal details
- Born: K. A. Parinda Ranasinghe
- Parent: Parinda Ranasinghe (father)
- Education: International Maritime Law Institute (LL.M): National University of Singapore (LL.M); Sri Lanka Law College; Royal College, Colombo
- Profession: Attorney-at-law

K. A. Parinda Ranasinghe Jr., PC is a Sri Lankan lawyer who serves as the 49th Attorney General of Sri Lanka. He was appointed by President Ranil Wickremesinghe and has served since 12 July 2024.

He was appointed Acting Attorney General by President Wickremesinghe on 1 July 2024 and served in that capacity until his appointment was made permanent.

== Early life ==
Ranasinghe is an alumnus of Royal College, Colombo. He graduated from Sri Lanka Law College, the National University of Singapore and the International Maritime Law Institute.

His father, Parinda Ranasinghe, was a former puisne justice of the Supreme Court of Sri Lanka and the 38th Chief Justice of the country.

== Career ==
Ranasinghe joined the Attorney General's Department in 1993 and has held various positions, including Senior State Counsel, Deputy Solicitor General, Additional Solicitor General and Senior Additional Solicitor General.

Upon his appointment as Additional Solicitor General, he was also named a President's Counsel and was sworn in on 10 July 2018.

Legal offices
| Preceded by Sanjay Rajaratnam | Attorney General of Sri Lanka; 2024–present | Succeeded by Incumbent |
