= Walter Jayawardena =

Sri Lankan ambassador to the Soviet Union

Walter Jayawardena QC

8th Sri Lankan Ambassador to the Soviet Union
- In office 1977–1978
- Preceded by: C. E. S. Weeratunga
- Succeeded by: R. C. A. Johnpulle

24th Solicitor General of Ceylon
- In office 1967–1968
- Governor General: William Gopallawa
- Preceded by: Victor Tennekoon
- Succeeded by: L. B. T. Premaratne

Personal details
- Education: University of London
- Profession: Barrister

Edmund Walter Perera Seneviratne Jayawardena, QC (6 March 1910 - 1983) was a Sri Lankan lawyer and diplomat. He was the 24th Solicitor General of Ceylon and Sri Lankan Ambassador to the Soviet Union.

Having graduated with a BA degree from the University of London, Jayawardena was called to the bar in 1941 as a Barrister from the Lincoln's Inn. Returning to Ceylon, he started his legal practice in the unofficial bar, yet served as an acting/additional crown counsel at times between 1942 and 1944. In January 1947, he was he was appointed crown counsel in the Attorney General's Department. From October 1947 to August 1950 he served in the Ceylon's High Commission to the United Kingdom first as Secretary to the Ceylon Government Representatives in London, Third Secretary and acting Second Secretary. On his return he returned to service as a crown counsel. In 1953 he was promoted to senior crown counsel. In 1967 he was appointed Solicitor General of Ceylon, succeeding Victor Tennekoon, and held the office until 1968. He was succeeded by L. B. T. Premaratne.

He returned to unofficial bar and served as Sri Lankan Ambassador to the Soviet Union and Yugoslavia from 1977 to 1978. He was married to Marie Muller, daughter of Dr. W.M. Muller, they had one son David Jayawardena, based in Ireland. He had seven grandchildren, all brought up in Youghal, Co. Cork, Ireland: Walter, Reuben, Lucy, Tamar, Frederick, Gregory and Abigail. He died in Youghal, Co Cork, Ireland in 1983 during a visit to his family there.

Legal offices
| Preceded by Victor Tennekoon | Solicitor General of Ceylon; 1967–1968 | Succeeded by L. B. T. Premaratne |
