= Noel Gratiaen =

Ceylonese judge

Edward Frederick Noel Gratiaen CMG, QC

30th Attorney General of Ceylon
- In office 2 May 1956 – 1957
- Governor General: Oliver E. Goonetilleke
- Preceded by: Hema Henry Basnayake
- Succeeded by: Douglas St. Clive Budd Jansze

Puisne Judge of the Supreme Court of Ceylon
- In office March 1948 – May 1956

Member of Parliament for Burgher Community (appointed member)
- In office November 1947 – March 1948
- Preceded by: position created

Personal details
- Born: 20 December 1912
- Died: 1973
- Spouse: Zillah née Weinman

Edward Frederick Noel Gratiaen (20 December 1904 – 1973) CMG, QC, was a Ceylonese lawyer and judge. He was a former Attorney General of Ceylon and puisne judge of the Supreme Court of Ceylon.

== Education ==
He was educated at S. Thomas' College, Mount Lavinia, he then went on to study at Exeter College, Oxford and graduated with a BA in 1925. Upon his return to Ceylon, he became a journalist joining the Ceylon Independent of Sir Marcus Fernando, however after the paper went out of publication, he enrolled at the Ceylon Law College and qualified as an Advocate.

== Legal career ==
Gratiaen started his legal practice in the Unofficial Bar, establishing a lucrative practice in criminal law. He was the Counsel for Philip Norton Banks, the Inspector General of Police in the infamous Bracegirdle Inquiry. In 1946, he took silk as a KC. He subsequently appeared in several election petition cases after the country's first parliamentary elections in 1947.

== Military service ==
In 1928, Gratiaen was commissioned a Second Lieutenant in the Ceylon Light Infantry. With the formation of the Ceylon Naval Volunteer Force on 1 January 1938, Gratiaen volunteered and was commissioned as one of two Paymaster Sub Lieutenants on 4 March 1938, becoming the first Ceylonese to become naval officers, the other being Susantha de Fonseka. With the outbreak of World War 2, he was mobilized in September 1939 and was a Lieutenant Commander (S) by the end of the war having been absorbed into the Royal Naval Volunteer Reserve during the war.

== Member of parliament ==
In November 1947, Gratiaen was appointed a member of the Ceylon House of Representatives. He was one of six members appointed by the Governor-General, to represent important interests which were not represented or inadequately represented in the House. He resigned in early 1948 having been appointed to the judiciary. He was succeeded by Rosslyn Koch.

== Judicial career ==
On 22 March 1948, he was appointed a Puisne Justice of the Supreme Court. He served as the Chairmen of Special Committee on Prisons, civil courts commission and commissioner Welikada prison breakout. He was a member of the Judicial Service Commission. In 1952, he presided over the trial of the Sathasivam murder case at the Assizes Court of the Western Province.

== Attorney General of Ceylon ==
Gratiaen was appointed the Attorney General of Ceylon on 2 May 1956, succeeding Hema Henry Basnayake, and held the office until his retirement in 1957. He was succeeded by Douglas St. Clive Budd Jansze.

== Later life ==
Gratiaen migrated to Britain, where he established a successful legal practice, even appearing before the Judicial Committee of the Privy Council. He was secured as counsel by Obafemi Awolowo to appear for him in Nigeria in 1960. He Chaired the Commission on Law Reforms, which was known as the Gratiaen Commission.

== Honors ==
Gratiaen was appointed a Companion of the Order of St Michael and St George (CMG) in the 1952 New Year Honours. He had also received the Volunteer Reserve Decoration, the Defense Medal, the War Medal 1939–1945 and the Queen Elizabeth II Coronation Medal.

== Sports ==
He played Rugby Union for the Ceylonese Rugby & Football Club and the Ceylonese team, that participated in the All- India tournament. He served two terms as President of the Ceylon Rugby Football Union from 1948 to 1950. He donated the Gratiaen Cup before he migrated, which is annually awarded to the winners of the Western Province Schools and the Central Province Schools. He was also the Steward of the Colombo Turf Club and President of the Ceylon Amateur Athletic Association.

== Personal life ==
He married Zillah Weinman in 1940.

Legal offices
Preceded by Hema Henry Basnayake	Attorney General of Ceylon; 1956–1957	Succeeded by Douglas St. Clive Budd Jansze
