= Gamlath =

Gamlath is a surname. Notable people with the surname include:

- Sucharitha Gamlath (1934–2013), Sri Lankan professor
- Suhada Gamlath (fl. 2016), Sri Lankan lawyer
