= P. L. D. Premaratne =

36th Solicitor General of Sri Lanka

36th Solicitor General of Sri Lanka
- In office 1994–1996
- President: Chandrika Kumaratunga
- Preceded by: Shibly Aziz
- Succeeded by: Upawansa Yapa

P. L. D. Premaratne was the 36th Solicitor General of Sri Lanka. He was appointed on 1994, succeeding Shibly Aziz, and held the office until 1996. He was succeeded by Upawansa Yapa.

Legal offices
Preceded by Shibly Aziz	Solicitor General of Sri Lanka; 1994–1996	Succeeded by Upawansa Yapa
