= K. C. Kamalasabayson =

K. C. Kamalasabayson PC
- கே. சி. கமலசபேசன்

39th Attorney General of Sri Lanka
- In office 1999–2007
- President: Chandrika Kumaratunga
- Preceded by: Sarath N. Silva
- Succeeded by: C. R. De Silva

38th Solicitor General of Sri Lanka
- In office 1998–1999
- President: Chandrika Kumaratunga
- Preceded by: Upawansa Yapa
- Succeeded by: C. R. De Silva

Personal details
- Born: 8 April 1949 Trincomalee, Ceylon
- Died: 12 August 2007 (aged 58) Chennai, India
- Education: Ceylon Law College; University of Colombo; King's College London
- Profession: Lawyer
- Ethnicity: Sri Lankan Tamil

Kandapper Chinniah Kamalasabayson (8 April 1949 – 12 August 2007) was a Sri Lankan Tamil lawyer, Solicitor General of Sri Lanka and Attorney General of Sri Lanka.

== Early life and family ==
Kamalasabayson was born on 8 April 1949 in Trincomalee, eastern Ceylon. He was the son of V. K. Chinniah, a landed proprietor and philanthropist. Kamalasabayson's brother K. C. Kamalanathan was Principal State Counsel in Zambia and Principal Crown Prosecutor in Lesotho. Kamalasabayson was educated at Colombo Hindu Primary School and S. Thomas' College, Mount Lavinia. After school he joined Ceylon Law College, graduating in November 1971 with a first class honours pass. He later received a master's degree in public law from the University of Colombo (1994) and a master's degree in international business law from King's College London (1995).

Kamalasabayson married Ramani. They had a daughter, Vidya.

== Career ==
Kamalasabayson became an advocate of the Supreme Court on 23 June 1972. He worked at the Unofficial Bar in the chambers of G. F. Sethukavalar and E. Balanadarajah before joining the Attorney-General's Department as an acting State Counsel on 1 August 1974. He was promoted to Senior State Counsel (1983), Deputy Solicitor General (1992) and Additional Solicitor General (1 March 1996). He was made a President's Counsel in 1996. He became Solicitor-General on 1 December 1998 before being promoted to Attorney General on 15 October 1999. He retired on 7 April 2007.

Kamalasabayson was a visiting lecturer at Faculty of Law, University of Colombo, Open University of Sri Lanka and Sri Lanka Law College where he was also an examiner. He was appointed to the Council of Legal Education of Sri Lanka in 1998. He had completed the Legal Advisors' course at the Institute of Advanced Legal Studies, International Contract Negotiation course at the International Law Institute and the Construction Contracts course at the International Development Law Institute. He was appointed to the Monetary Board of Sri Lanka on 18 July 2007.

Kamalasabayson died on 12 August 2007 at Apollo Hospital in Chennai, India.

Legal offices
Preceded by Sarath N. Silva	Attorney General of Sri Lanka; 1999–2007	Succeeded by Chitta De Silva
