= Palitha =

Palitha may refer to

- Palitha Fernando, Sri Lankan lawyer
- Palitha Kohona, Sri Lankan diplomat
- Palitha Perera (born 1942), cricket commentator
- Palitha Thewarapperuma (1960–2024), Sri Lankan politician
- Palitha Range Bandara (born 1962), Sri Lankan politician
