= Parinda Ranasinghe (disambiguation) =

Parinda Ranasinghe may refer to:

- Parinda Ranasinghe, Sri Lankan lawyer and the 38th Chief Justice
- Parinda Ranasinghe Jr., Sri Lankan lawyer and the 49th Attorney General
