= Suhada =

Suhada may refer to:

- Suhada Gamlath, Sri Lankan lawyer
- Suhada Koka, film
