= Tilak Marapana =

Sri Lankan lawyer and politician

Hon. Tilak Marapana PC
- තිලක් මාරපන திலக் மரபனா
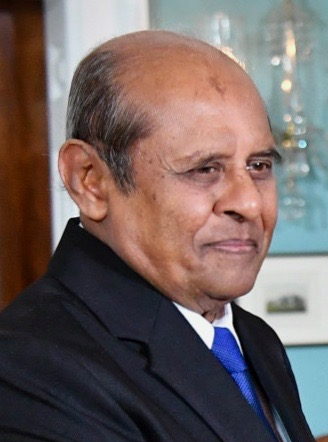
- Marapana in 2019

Minister of Foreign Affairs
- In office 15 August 2017 – 22 November 2019
- President: Maithripala Sirisena
- Preceded by: Ravi Karunanayake
- Succeeded by: Dinesh Gunawardena

Minister of Development Assignments
- In office 23 May 2017 – 22 November 2019
- President: Maithripala Sirisena

Minister of Law and Order and Prison Reforms
- In office 4 September 2015 – 9 November 2015
- President: Maithripala Sirisena
- Preceded by: John Amaratunga
- Succeeded by: Sagala Ratnayaka

Minister of Transport, Highways and Aviation
- In office 2002 – April 2004
- President: Chandrika Kumaratunga
- Preceded by: Gamini Atukorale
- Succeeded by: Felix Perera

Minister of Defence
- In office 12 December 2001 – November 2003
- President: Chandrika Kumaratunga
- Preceded by: Chandrika Kumaratunga
- Succeeded by: Chandrika Kumaratunga

36th Attorney General of Sri Lanka
- In office July 1992 – 1995
- President: Ranasinghe Premadasa; Dingiri Banda Wijetunga; Chandrika Kumaratunga
- Preceded by: Pandikoralalage Sunil Chandra De Silva
- Succeeded by: Shibly Aziz

34th Solicitor General of Sri Lanka
- In office 1991–1992
- President: Ranasinghe Premadasa
- Preceded by: S. W. B Wadugodapitiya
- Succeeded by: Shibly Aziz

Member of Parliament for National List
- In office 2000–2004
- In office 2015–2020

Personal details
- Born: Tilak Janaka Marapana; August 1942 (age 84)
- Party: United National Party
- Spouse: Stella Marapana
- Children: 2
- Education: St Thomas' College

Tilak Janaka Marapana PC (born August 1942) is a Sri Lankan lawyer. He was the Minister of Foreign Affairs and Development Assignments. He served as a Member of Parliament appointed from the national list and had served as Minister of Law and Order, Prison Reforms from September 2015 to November 2015 and Minister of Defence (2001–2003) and Minister of Transport, Highways and Aviation (2002–2004). As Minister of Defence, he was the only non-Presidential or Prime Ministerial holder of the portfolio. A lawyer by profession and a President's Counsel, he had served as a government prosecutor in the Attorney General's Department for twenty six years, serving as Solicitor General and Attorney General.

== Early life and education ==
Marapana hails from Ratnapura, Sabaragamuwa, he is the second son of former District Judge P. Marapana and has one brother Gamini Marapana, PC. He is an alumnus of S. Thomas' College, Mount Lavinia. He has a degree in chemistry and maths as well as a law degree.

== Legal career ==
Marapana joined the Attorney General's Department as a Crown Counsel in 1968. In 1988 he was made a President's Counsel. In 1990 he was appointed Solicitor General and thereafter was promoted to Attorney General in 1992. He retired as Attorney General in 1995, following the change of the United National Party Government, reverting to the Unofficial Bar.

== Political career ==
In 2000 he was appointed a Member of Parliament from the national list by the UNP. In 2001 he was made Minister of Defence. In 2002 he was made Minister of Transport, Highways, and Aviation in addition to the portfolio of Minister of Defence. In 2015, he was reappointed Member of Parliament from the national list and was appointed Cabinet Minister of Law and Order, Prison Reforms in September 2015. He resigned from the post in November 2015 after a speech he made in Parliament regarding the legal position of the Avant Garde controversy. In May 2017, following a cabinet reshuffle he was appointed Minister of Development Assignments. He was also appointed for the post of Minister of Foreign Affairs on August 15, 2017 after the resignation of Ravi Karunanayake.

== Family ==
Marapana is married to Stella, they have two sons, Janaka and Chamith both practicing lawyers.

== See also ==
- Ministry of Defence

Political offices
Preceded by	Minister of Development Assignments; 2017–present	Succeeded by
Preceded by John Amaratunga	Law and Order and Prison Reforms; 2015–2015	Succeeded by Sagala Ratnayaka
Preceded by Chandrika Kumaratunga	Minister of Defence; 2001–2003	Succeeded by Chandrika Kumaratunga
Preceded by Gamini Atukorale	Minister of Transport, Highways and Aviation; 2002–2004	Succeeded by ?
Preceded by Pandikoralalage Sunil Chandra De Silva	Attorney General of Sri Lanka; 1992–1995	Succeeded by Shibly Aziz
Preceded by S. W. B Wadugodapitiya	Solicitor General of Sri Lanka; 1990–1992	Succeeded by Shibly Aziz
