= Attorney General Silva =

Attorney General Silva (or De Silva) may refer to:

- C. R. De Silva (died 2013), Attorney General of Sri Lanka
- Manikku Wadumestri Hendrick de Silva (fl. 1930s–1960s), Attorney General of Ceylon
- Pandikoralalage Sunil Chandra De Silva (fl. 1980s–1990s), Attorney General of Sri Lanka
- Sarath N. Silva (born 1946), Attorney General of Sri Lanka
