= Jansze =

Jansze is a surname. Notable people with the surname include:

- Ansley Jansze (born 1986), Sri Lankan cricketer
- Douglas St. Clive Budd Jansze, Ceylonese lawyer
