= Murugeysen Tiruchelvam =

Sri Lankan politician (1907–1976)

Senator M. Tiruchelvam QC

Minister of Local Government
- In office 1965–1968
- Prime Minister: Dudley Senanayake
- Preceded by: Mahanama Samaraweera
- Succeeded by: Ranasinghe Premadasa

Solicitor General of Ceylon
- In office 1957–1960
- Governor General: Oliver Ernest Goonetilleke
- Preceded by: D. S. C. B. Jansze
- Succeeded by: A. C. Alles

Ceylonese Senator
- In office 1965–1971

Personal details
- Born: 19 November 1907 Jaffna, British Ceylon
- Died: 23 November 1976 (aged 69)
- Party: Illankai Tamil Arasu Kachchi
- Other political affiliations: Tamil United Liberation Front
- Spouse: Punitham
- Children: Neelan, Kamini, Janaki, Vasudevan
- Education: S. Thomas' College, Mount Lavinia; Ceylon University College
- Profession: Advocate

Murugeysen Tiruchelvam, QC (19 November 1907 – 23 November 1976) was a Sri Lankan Tamil lawyer and politician. Tiruchelvam was a leading lawyer having served as the Solicitor General of Ceylon; he served as the Cabinet Minister of Local Government as a member of Senate of Ceylon.

== Early life ==
Tiruchelvam was born on 19 November 1907, in Jaffna. When he was three-months old he and his mother went to British Malaya where his father Visvanathan Murugeysu, who hailed from Vaddukoddai, was Head of the Telegraph Office, an officer in the British colonial administration, in Kuala Lumpur. The Tiruchelvam family were friends of the Chelvanayakam family who were also living in Malaya. Tiruchelvam had three brothers and a sister. Tiruchelvam and his brother Rajendra were sent to British Ceylon to have their education at S. Thomas' College, Mount Lavinia. S. J. V. Chelvanayakam was the brothers' guardian. Tiruchelvam later studied at Ceylon University College, obtaining an honours degree in History.

== Legal career ==
After graduating Tiruchelvam studied law at the Ceylon Law College and became an advocate in 1933 when he started practicing law in the unofficial bar. He served as the acting/additional magistrate in Negombo, Panadura and Galle till 1945. He was appointed Acting Assistant to the Legal Secretary to the then Legal Secretary Sir Alan Rose. He assisted Sir Alan in drafting the Soulbury Constitution. Tiruchelvam was appointed Crown Counsel in October 1947 and was promoted to Senior Crown Counsel in October 1949. He was appointed Solicitor General of Ceylon in 1957, a position he held until 1960. He took silks as a Queen's Counsel in 1959.

Following his retirement he reverted to the unofficial bar. During this time Tiruchelvam took part in a number of high-profile legal cases. He was one of the defence lawyers in the 1976 Trial-At-Bar of Appapillai Amirthalingam, K. P. Ratnam, Murugesu Sivasithamparam and Kathiripillai Thurairatnam, four leading TULF politicians who were charged with sedition for defying the First Republican Constitution. 72 Tamil lawyers took part in the defence, including S. J. V. Chelvanayakam and G. G. Ponnambalam, two leading lawyer-politicians. All the defendants were acquitted. Tiruchelvam also defended Junius Richard Jayewardene when he was threatened with expulsion from the United National Party in 1972.

== Political career ==
Tiruchelvam became involved in politics in the 1960s, becoming chief advisor and principal political strategist to S. J. V. Chelvanayakam, founder/leader of Illankai Tamil Arasu Kachchi (Federal Party). Tiruchelvam and other ITAK leaders were jailed in 1961 for staging a mass satyagraha against the Sinhala Only Act. They spent over six months in Panagoda jail.

=== Minister of Local Government ===
In 1965, after the signing of the Senanayake-Chelvanayakam Pact (aka Dudley-Chelvanayakam Pact), ITAK joined the United National Party-led national government. ITAK's MP refused take ministerial portfolios but instead Tiruchelvam was appointed to the Senate of Ceylon and made Cabinet Minister of Local Government. During Tiruchelvam's ministerial tenure the eventual creation of the University of Jaffna was started, the Tamil Language Special Provisions Act (aka Reasonable Use of Tamil Act) became law in 1966 and administrative reforms carried out.

Tiruchelvam resigned from the government in November 1968 when Prime Minister Dudley Senanayake overturned his decision to make Fort Fredrick in Trincomalee a sacred precinct (the fort contained the Koneswaram temple). He was succeeded by his Parliamentary Secretary Ranasinghe Premadasa. ITAK then left the national government, blaming the government's failure to implement the Senanayake-Chelvanayakam Pact. Tiruchelvam stayed on in the Senate until it was abolished in 1971.

He died on 23 November 1976, aged 69.

== Family ==
Tiruchelvam married Punithavathy (Punitham) Canagaratnam. They had four children: Neelan—went on to become a politician, Kamini, Janaki, Vasudevan.
