= Rosslyn Koch =

Ceylonese businessman, company director and politician

Hon. Theodore Hugh Rosslyn Koch OBE

Member of the Ceylon Parliament for Burgher Community (appointed member)
- In office April 1948 – October 1959
- Preceded by: Edward Frederick Noel Gratiaen
- Succeeded by: Eric Brohier

Personal details
- Born: 21 December 1886 Colombo, Sri Lanka
- Died: 24 April 1961 (aged 74) Colombo, Sri Lanka
- Spouse: Florence Lilian née Kriekenbeek
- Children: 4

Theodore Hugh Rosslyn Koch (21 December 1886 – 24 April 1961) was a Ceylonese businessman, company director and politician.

== Life and career ==
Koch was born on 21 December 1886, the sixth child and fourth son of Cecil Theodore (1852-1890) and Evelyn Harriet (née Foenander) (1855-1919). Koch married Florence Lilian Kriekenbeek (born 1891) on 7 April 1915; they had four children.

In 1938, Koch became a founding director of the Ceylon Insurance Company, going on to serve as its chairman from 1942 to 1960. In April 1948, he was appointed as the Burgher Member of the Ceylon House of Representatives, following the resignation of Edward Frederick Noel Gratiaen, who had been appointed as Justice of the Supreme Court. He was one of six members appointed by the governor-general to represent important interests which were not represented or inadequately represented in the House. Koch served in three successive parliaments until he resigned in October 1959, wbeing succeeded by Dr. Eric Brohier. During his tenure, Koch served as the chair of the Public Accounts Committee.

In the 1952 New Year Honours, Koch was made an Officer of the Order of the British Empire (Civil Division) for his services to the export trade.

From 1952 until 1956 Koch served as the chairman of the Employers' Federation of Ceylon.

Koch died in 1961, aged 74.
