= V. C. Gunatilleke =

V. C. Gunatilleke PC

31st Solicitor General of Sri Lanka
- In office 1977–1981
- President: William Gopallawa
- Preceded by: Elanga Wikramanayake
- Succeeded by: K. M. M. B. Kulatunga

Personal details
- Born: Sri Lanka
- Education: Nalanda College Colombo

V. C. Gunathilake PC was the 31st Solicitor General of Sri Lanka. He was appointed in 1977, succeeding Elanga Wikramanayake, and held the office until 1981. He was succeeded by K. M. M. B. Kulatunga. He received his education at Nalanda College Colombo.

Legal offices
Preceded by Elanga Wikramanayake	Solicitor General of Sri Lanka; 1977–1981	Succeeded by K. M. M. B. Kulatunga
