= M. F. S. Pulle =

Ceylonese judge

17th Solicitor General of Ceylon
- In office 1948–1950
- Governor General: Sir Henry Monck-Mason Moore
- Preceded by: Hema Henry Basnayake
- Succeeded by: Robert Crossette-Thambiah

M. F. S. Pulle (1898–1975) was Ceylonese judge and lawyer. He was a Puisne Justice of the Supreme Court of Ceylon and the 17th Solicitor General of Ceylon. He was appointed on 1948, succeeding Hema Henry Basnayake, and held the office until 1950. He was succeeded by Robert Crossette-Thambiah.

Legal offices
| Preceded by Hema Henry Basnayake | Solicitor General of Ceylon; 1948–1950 | Succeeded by Robert Crossette-Thambiah |
