= Stanley Obeysekere =

9th Solicitor General of Ceylon
- In office 1929–1932
- Governor: Herbert Stanley
- Preceded by: Maas Thajoon Akbar
- Succeeded by: L. M. D. de Silva

Stanley Obeysekere was the 9th Solicitor General of Ceylon. He was appointed on 1929, succeeding Maas Thajoon Akbar, and held the office until 1932. He was succeeded by L. M. D. de Silva.

Legal offices
| Preceded by Maas Thajoon Akbar | Solicitor General of Ceylon; 1929–1932 | Succeeded by L. M. D. de Silva |
