= Upawansa Yapa =

Upawansa Yapa PC

37th Solicitor General of Sri Lanka
- In office 1996–1998
- President: Chandrika Kumaratunga
- Preceded by: P. L. D. Premaratne
- Succeeded by: K. C. Kamalasabayson

Personal details
- Born: 2 November 1941 (age 84) Bandarawela, Sri Lanka
- Education: Nalanda College Colombo; University of Ceylon

Upawansa Yapa PC was the 37th Solicitor General of Sri Lanka.

== Early childhood ==
Upawansa Yapa was born on 2 November 1941 in Bandarawela, Sri Lanka.

Yapa received his education at Nalanda College Colombo and while at school, he led both Sinhala and English debating teams. He subsequently attended the University of Ceylon, Peradeniya in 1960, where he obtained Bachelor of Arts degree.

== Career ==
In 1965 Yapa joined the Ceylon Law College and was admitted as an advocate of Your Lordship's Court in February, 1969. He joined the Attorney General's Department as a Crown Counsel in 1970 and served in the Department's Criminal Division. Later he rose to the position of Senior State Counsel, Deputy Solicitor General, Additional Solicitor General and finally as the Solicitor General.

He was appointed President's Counsel in September 1992. Yapa has appeared for the State in several important Criminal trials, including Sepala Ekanayake aircraft hijacking case.

Legal offices
Preceded by P. L. D. Premaratne	Solicitor General of Sri Lanka; 1996–1998	Succeeded by K. C. Kamalasabayson
