= Douglas St. Clive Budd Jansze =

Ceylonese lawyer (born 1909)

31st Attorney General of Ceylon
- In office 12 April 1957 – 1966
- Governors General: Oliver Ernest Goonetilleke; William Gopallawa
- Preceded by: Edward Fredrick Noel Gratiaen
- Succeeded by: Abdul Caffoor Mohamad Ameer

20th Solicitor General of Ceylon
- In office 1955–1957
- Governor General: Oliver Ernest Goonetilleke
- Preceded by: Thusew Fernando
- Succeeded by: Murugeysen Tiruchelvam

Douglas St. Clive Budd Jansze (16 February 1909) was a Ceylonese lawyer. He was the 31st Attorney General of Ceylon and Solicitor General of Ceylon.

Having graduated from the Ceylon University College with a BA degree from the University of London, Jansze qualified as an advocate from the Ceylon Law College and was admitted to the bar in 1934. He acted as Assistant Legal Draftsman in 1936 and Crown Counsel in 1937 and 1943 on occasions between when he was appointed a Crown Counsel in 1943; he served as Acting Deputy Commissioner, Compensation Claims (1946-1947). In 1949 he was appointed Senior Crown Counsel, having served in an acting capacity. He was appointed Solicitor General of Ceylon in 1955 succeeding T. S. Fernando and served until 1957. He was appointed on 1 April 1957, succeeding Edward Fredrick Noel Gratiaen, and held the office until 1966. Abdul Caffoor Mohamad Ameer succeeded him.

He was appointed an Officer in the Order of the British Empire in the 1955 Birthday Honours.

Legal offices
Preceded by Edward Fredrick Noel Gratiaen	Attorney General of Ceylon; 1957–1966	Succeeded by Abdul Caffoor Mohamad Ameer
Preceded by Thusew Fernando	Solicitor General of Ceylon; 1955–1957	Succeeded by Murugeysen Tiruchelvam
