= Pradeep Kariyawasam =

Sri Lankan businessman

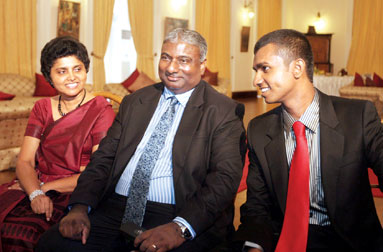
Chief Justice Shirani Bandaranayake, her husband Pradeepa Kariyawasam and son

Pradeepa Gamini Suraj Kariyawasam is a Sri Lankan businessman. Former Chairman of the Sri Lanka Insurance Corporation and the National Savings Bank of Sri Lanka he is the husband of Shirani Bandaranayake, 43rd Chief Justice of Sri Lanka. He was arrested and charged with bribery in 2013.

== Early life ==
Educated at the Royal College, Colombo, he was the vice-captain of his college cricket team and played in the Royal-Thomian.

== Career ==
A specialist in marketing, Kariyawasam is a management consultant. Prior to his appointment as Chairman of the National Savings Bank he had served as a manager at Unimo Enterprise, United Motors Lanka (Ltd), Browns Group of Companies and Ceylinco Ltd.

=== SLIC ===
In June 2009 the Supreme Court issued as order to the Treasury Secretary to appoint a board of directors for the Sri Lanka Insurance Corporation (SLIC) after the governmental takeover. The Government nominated him as the new chairman of the board.

During his tenure at SLIC chairman (2009–2010) Kariyawasam ran into a dispute with the board of directors over alleged violation of procedures. The Treasury Secretary of Sri Lanka, Dr P.B. Jayasundera intervened to settle this and warned kariyawasam against overstepping his powers as a non-executive chairman of the board.

In May 2012 the investment committee of SLIC and its partner EPF got treasury approval for the strategic purchase of 16% of NDB shares to be executed by the purchase of Gold Quest and its parcel of shares of the bank. This company was owned by Vijay Eswaran. An attractive price was on offered for both institutes. At that point two old buddies Ajith Devasurendra and Ishara Nanayakkara got Pradeep Kariywasam to write to the parties concerned that SLIC has agreed to allocate 7% of these shares to LOLC, something that came as a surprise to all. Had not the other Directors objected, LOLC would have made a windfall from the special price SLIC managed to negotiate for this parcel of NDB shares. By his actions Kariyawasam attempted to create a potential gain of Rs. 72 Million for a private, unrelated company at the cost of government agencies. A clear case of insider trading was avoided due to the prompt action of SLIC Directors.

From then on Kariyawasam was on his own and did not agree with many decisions that were favoured by majority of board members. Hence, the other directors decided to bring this issue to notice of higher authorities which resulted in the removal Kariywasam from his position at SLIC.

=== NSB ===
On 15 May 2010 Pradeep Kariyawasam was appointed the Chairman of National Savings Bank by the government. The government was accused of disregarding his well documented failures at Sri Lanka Insurance Corporation.

In May 2012, serious concerns were raised by media and other concerned parties about his involvement in the highly controversial purchase of 13% stake of The Finance Company at a highly inflated price. This resulted in the intervention of the Ministry of Finance which in turn stopped the deal in the larger interest the public which had invested in state owned banks. In the meantime, the Securities and Exchange Commission (SEC) was carrying out its own investigations into some other alleged irregularities. On 9 May 2012 the main opposition party UNP demanded his resignation accusing him of plundering public funds. Calling the deal a Sophisticated Bank Robbery, opposition lawmaker and leading economist Dr Harsha de Silva said the country needed sophisticated law enforcement officers and regulators to tackle such fraud. Dr. De Silva called for his resignation and said authorities should be allowed to carry out an impartial inquiry and punish any offenders without fear and favor just because kariyawasam is the husband of Sri Lanka's chief justice.

Members of five banking sector trade unions of the National Savings Bank (NSB) resorted to a wildcat strike and demanded the resignation of NSB chairman Prdeepa Kariyawasam over the controversial share transaction amounting to Rs. 390 million. NSB branch union president, Lionel Wickremesinghe noted that the failure of the government to remove those responsible from the top management would cause irreparable damage to the credibility of the NSB. Unions affiliated to the SLFP, UNP and JVP as well as the executive officers' union had been involved in the campaign, adding that their aim was to protect the bank and that the depositors should not panic as the bank had a sound liquidity position and their deposits were protected by the government. It alleged that the husband of the Chief Justice of Sri Lanka, Pradeep Kariyawasam, who continued to enjoy the power and position as chairman of the NSB among several other plum postings offered by the Rajapaksa Government in a glaring example of conflict of interest.

=== Resignation ===
On 21 May 2012 Kariyawasam tended his resignation from NSB. He told the media that he had sent a lengthy resignation letter to the relevant authorities and added that the letter might be made public later on. However, the copy of the letter was never made public.

=== Bribery case ===
Following the impeachment of his wife, Shirani Bandaranayake, Kariyawasam was arrested on charges of bribery in which he was alleged to be involved in, which was listed as reasons for the impeachment of his wife. He was released on two personal bails of Rs. 10 million each case. 26 Nov 2018-Pradeep Kariyawasam was given a suspended prison sentence and was also fined Rs. 300,000.

Kariyawasam was found guilty over the incident of purchasing shares of The Finance Company using NSB funds while being fully aware of the loss entailed to the government due to the decision.

== Family ==
He is married to Shirani Bandaranayake, the 43rd Chief Justice of Sri Lanka. They have one son, Shaveen Bandaranayake Kariyawasam.
