= Eighth Amendment to the Constitution of Sri Lanka =

Constitution of Sri Lanka

Eighth Amendment to the Constitution of Sri Lanka was enacted on 6 March 1984 and replaced provisions in the Constitution of Sri Lanka related to the appointment of Senior attorneys-at-law by the President of Sri Lanka and replaced it with the new presidential appointment of President's Counsel (PC), providing with it all privileges enjoyed by Queen's Counsels.

== History ==
The history of Queen's/King's Counsels in British Ceylon began in 1903 when the first native Ceylonese were appointed. The position remained even through the Dominion of Ceylon. Following the establishment of the republic of Sri Lanka, all Queen's Counsel appointments lapsed without any title made to replace it. Temporarily, the former Queen's Counsels were permitted to use "Senior Attorney-at-Law" as a descriptor. The Eighth Amendment to the Constitution was passed in order to create a formal replacement title of honour for senior Sri Lankan attorneys. The Amendment provided that the former Queen's Counsels would now be titled as President's Counsel with all the same rights and privileges they enjoyed under the Crown of Ceylon. It provided that the only person who could appoint PCs under the Amendment was the President of Sri Lanka. The first PCs were appointed in 1984.

== Criticism ==
There has been criticism of the Amendment's provisions for appointment of PCs. With the appointments being solely at the discretion of the President, it has led to allegations that PC status was being awarded based on their closeness to the President or Ministers rather than on merit. One alleged that an attorney who was unable to draft a legal argument in English was awarded PC status.
