= Daya Perera =

Sri Lankan diplomat and lawyer (died 2013)

His Excellency Lieutenant Colonel Daya Perera PC

High Commissioner to Canada
- In office 2008 – June 16, 2013

Personal details
- Died: June 16, 2013 Colombo, Sri Lanka

Military service
- Allegiance: Sri Lanka
- Branch/service: Sri Lanka Army
- Rank: Lieutenant colonel
- Unit: Ceylon Light Infantry

Lt. Colonel Daya Perera, PC (died June 16, 2013) was a Sri Lankan diplomat and lawyer, who was the Sri Lankan High Commissioner to Canada and Ambassador to the United Nations in New York City.

== Early life and education ==
Educated at Royal College Colombo, Perera excelled in sports gaining college colours for rugby football and playing in the Bradby Shield Encounter as part of the first Royal College team to win the Bradby Shield. After leaving school he studied law at the University of Ceylon and Colombo Law College.

== Career ==
=== Legal career ===
After taking his oaths as an advocate, Perera worked as a crown counsel for the Attorney General's Department. With the formation of the Legal Branch of the Sri Lanka Army, Perera was seconded to the army to serve as an adviser. He was commissioned as a captain in the Ceylon Light Infantry and was promoted as a lieutenant colonel. He attended a course on military law with the Army Legal Services Branch of the British Army. Later he resigned from the Attorney General's Department and joined the Unofficial bar.

Developing a legal practice in the Unofficial bar, Perera served as the Deputy President of the Bar Association, Councilor of Law Asia (Law Association of Asia and Pacific), Vice President of Indo-Pacific Congress on Legal medicines and Forensic Sciences (INPALMS) and President Medico Legal Society. He was made a President's Counsel in 1981.

=== Diplomatic career ===
From 1988 to 1991 Perera served as Sri Lanka's Ambassador, Extraordinary and plenipotentiary and accredited to United Nations in New York City and in 2008 he was appointed Sri Lankan High Commissioner to Canada.

=== Sports administration ===
Perera was a lifetime member of numerous legal and athletic clubs and societies. Most notably, he was elected President of the Sinhalese Sports Club (SSC), home of the historic Sinhalese Sports Club Ground, in 1998 and held the position until 2008. His portrait was unveiled at the Sinhalese Sports Club in 2011.

== Death ==
Perera died following a short illness in June 2013.

== See also ==
- Sri Lankan Non Career Diplomats

Diplomatic posts
| Preceded by ? | Sri Lankan High Commissioners to Canada; 2008–2013 | Succeeded by ? |
| Preceded by ? | Sri Lankan Ambassador to the UN; 1988–1991 | Succeeded by ? |
