= Hector Deheragoda =

Ceylonese judge

26th Solicitor General of Ceylon
- In office 1970–1972
- Governor General: William Gopallawa
- Preceded by: L. B. T. Premaratne
- Succeeded by: R. S. Wanasundera

Ekanayake Rajapakse Kodippilli Dissanayake Mudiyanseralahamilaye Hector Deheragoda was the 26th Solicitor General of Ceylon. He was appointed on 1970, succeeding L. B. T. Premaratne, and held the office until 1972. He was succeeded by R. S. Wanasundera.

Legal offices
| Preceded by L. B. T. Premaratne | Solicitor General of Ceylon; 1970–1972 | Succeeded by R. S. Wanasundera |
