= I. F. B. Wickramanayake =

Sri Lankan legal officer

29th Solicitor General of Sri Lanka
- In office 1975–1977
- President: William Gopallawa
- Preceded by: Shiva Pasupati
- Succeeded by: Elanga Wikramanayake

I. F. B. Wickramanayake was the 29th Solicitor General of Sri Lanka. He was appointed on 1975, succeeding Shiva Pasupati, and held the office until 1977. He was succeeded by Elanga Wikramanayake.

Legal offices
Preceded by Shiva Pasupati	Solicitor General of Sri Lanka; 1975–1977	Succeeded by Elanga Wikramanayake
