= S. W. B. Wadugodapitiya =

The Honourable Justice S. W. B. Wadugodapitiya

Puisne Justice of the Supreme Court of Sri Lanka
- In office 1991–2002
- Appointed by: Ranasinghe Premadasa

33rd Solicitor General of Sri Lanka
- In office 1989–1991
- President: J. R. Jayewardene
- Preceded by: K. M. M. B. Kulatunga
- Succeeded by: Tilak Marapana

Justice S. W. B. Wadugodapitiya, PC is a Sri Lankan judge. He was a Judge of the Supreme Court of Sri Lanka and had served as the Acting Chief Justice. He was also the 33rd Solicitor General of Sri Lanka.

Wadugodapitiya was educated at Royal College Colombo, where his classmates included Justice P. Edussuriya and Upali Wijewardene. He went on to gain an LL.B. and an LL.M. Joining the Attorney General's Department as a State Counsel, he served in the department for 25 years becoming the Solicitor General. He was appointed on 1989, succeeding K. M. M. B. Kulatunga, and held the office until 1991. He was succeeded by Tilak Marapana. During his career he served as Commissioner of the Mossad Commission, Commissioner of the Law Commission. In 1991 he was appointed as a Judge of the Supreme Court of Sri Lanka. He was a member of the Judges Institute of Sri Lanka, and the Council of Legal Education of Sri Lanka. After his retirement from the judiciary in 2002, he was appointed as Chairmen of the Presidential Commission of Inquiry on Matters Relating to Maintenance of Law and Order.

Legal offices
Preceded by K. M. M. B. Kulatunga	Solicitor General of Sri Lanka; 1989–1991	Succeeded by Tilak Marapana
