= A. R. Surendran =

Sri Lankan lawyer

A. R. Surendran PC
- Died: 11 April 2016
- Education: University of Brussels
- Occupation: Lawyer
- Spouse: Renuka-Devi
- Parent: Arumugam Ratnavadivel

Arumugam Ratnavadivel "A. R." Surendran (died 11 April 2016) was a Sri Lankan Tamil lawyer and President's Counsel.

== Early life and family ==
Surendran was the son of Arumugam Ratnavadivel. He was educated at Jaffna Central College between 1963 and 1974. He later studied at the University of Brussels, graduating with a LL.M. degree in international and comparative law. He carried out research work at the Institute of Advanced Legal Studies.

Surendran was married to Renuka-Devi, daughter of V. Murugesu.

== Career ==
Surendran practiced law in the Colombo bar and appellate courts. He was made a President's Counsel in 2004. He was chairman of the Law Committee of the Bar Association of Sri Lanka and an examiner at the Incorporated Council of Legal Education. He was a member of the law reform committees on land frauds and Thesavalamai and the advisory committee on law relating to Hindu religious trusts.

Surendran was the president of the Colombo branch of the Vivekananda Society. He was a trustee of the All Ceylon Hindu Congress. He died on 11 April 2016.
