= Prasantha Lal De Alwis =

Sri Lankan lawyer

Prasantha Lal De Alwis, President's counsel, obtained his LLB and LLM from University of Colombo. He initiated his career as a State Counsel at the Attorney General's Department of Sri Lanka in 1983, and had served in that capacity until 1990. Subsequently, he joined the private bar and since then had been practicing in both appellate and trial courts, specialized in the spheres of criminal and family Law. He also is a Corporate Director, visiting Lecturer at faculty of Law of the University of Colombo and Sri Lanka Law College. He is a member of the board of management for Lakshman Kadirgamar Institute for International relations and Strategic Studies.

He recently joined the diplomatic service upon his appointment as the Honorary Consulate of the republic of Seychelles in Sri Lanka. He currently serves as the principal of Sri Lanka Law College.

- Prasantha Lal De Alwis (23 July 2013). "The Role of Religion in Reconciliation" (PDF). Lakshman Kadirgamar Institute for International Relations and Strategic Studies. Archived from the original (PDF) on 19 February 2014.
- "Softlogic Holdings PLC". softlogic.lk.
- "SRI LANKA/SEYCHELLES - Prasantha Lal De Alwis - The Indian Ocean Newsletter". africaintelligence.com. 8 November 2013.
- "Ceylon Today – Prasantha De Alwis appointed Consul for Seychelles in Sri Lanka". ceylontoday.lk.
