= Shirani Bandaranayake =

Chief Justice of Sri Lanka from 2011 to 2013 and 2015

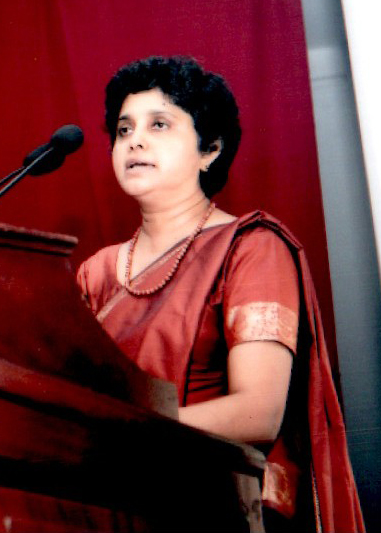

43rd Chief Justice of Sri Lanka
- In office 28 January 2015 – 29 January 2015
- Appointed by: Maithripala Sirisena
- Preceded by: Mohan Peiris (De facto)
- Succeeded by: K. Sripavan
- In office 18 May 2011 – 13 January 2013
- Appointed by: Mahinda Rajapaksa
- Preceded by: Asoka de Silva
- Succeeded by: Mohan Peiris (De facto)

Puisne Justice of the Supreme Court of Sri Lanka
- In office 30 October 1996 – 18 May 2011
- Appointed by: Chandrika Kumaratunga

Personal details
- Born: Upatissa Atapattu Bandaranayake Wasala Mudiyanse Ralahamilage Shirani Anshumala Bandaranayake; April 1958 (age 68) Kurunegala, North Western Province, Dominion of Ceylon (Now Sri Lanka)
- Spouse: Pradeep Kariyawasam
- Children: Shaveen Bandaranayake Kariyawasam
- Education: Anuradhapura Central College; University of Colombo; School of Oriental and African Studies, University of London
- Profession: Academic, Lawyer

Upatissa Atapattu Bandaranayake Wasala Mudiyanse Ralahamilage Shirani Anshumala Bandaranayake (born April 1958), known as Shirani Bandaranayake (Sinhala: ශිරාණි බණ්ඩාරනායක), served as the 43rd Chief Justice of Sri Lanka. Although a qualified lawyer, she has never practiced law. After university Bandaranayake entered academia, holding a number of senior positions at the University of Colombo, including associate professor of law and the dean of the Faculty of Law at the University of Colombo. She was first appointed to the Supreme Court of Sri Lanka in 1996, becoming Sri Lanka's first female Supreme Court Judge. Bandaranayake was appointed chief justice in May 2011 following the mandatory retirement of Asoka de Silva. Bandaranayake was controversially impeached by Parliament and then removed from office by President Mahinda Rajapaksa in January 2013. and on 28 January 2015 the government of Sri Lanka, had removed all obstacles for Bandaranayake to hold her position as the 43rd Chief Justice by the President Maithripala Sirisena, on the ground that her 2013 impeachment was unlawful and as such the appointment of Mohan Peiris, her successor, was void Ab initio. This paved the way for Bandaranayake to resume duties on 28 January 2015. She retired from the position on 29 January 2015, one day after her reappointment, claiming support for a free and fair Judiciary in Sri Lanka.

== Early life ==
Bandaranayake was born in April 1958 in Kurunegala. She is the daughter of Flora and Wilson Bandaranayake. Her mother was an English trained teacher whereas her father was a Provincial Director of Education. Bandaranayake has a sister, Renuka, who is an engineering graduate from Moratuwa university now living in Perth, Australia.

When Bandaranayake was young her father changed jobs on a number of occasions and as result she studied at a number of schools: Ginigathhena Maha Vidyalaya (1962–65), Hettimulla Bandaranayake Vidyalaya (1965), Tholangamuwa Vidyalaya (1965–70), Tholangamuwa Central College (1970–72). She then studied at Anuradhapura Central College where she passed her GCE Advanced Levels in 1976. She then entered the University of Colombo's Faculty of Law, graduating in December 1980 with an upper second Bachelor of Laws honours degree. She obtained a Master of Philosophy degree from the University of Colombo in October 1983. In the same year she was awarded the Commonwealth Open Scholarship and the Chevening Scholarship in 1989. She qualified as an attorney at law in September 1983. In March 1986, she obtained a PhD from the law school at the School of Oriental and African Studies, University of London, becoming the first woman in Sri Lanka to obtain this degree in law from a foreign university. She was also awarded the Fulbright-Hays Fellowship in 1996 and the British Council Assert Award in 1993 and 1994.

Bandaranayake is married to a former corporate executive Pradeep Kariyawasam. Shaveen is their only child.

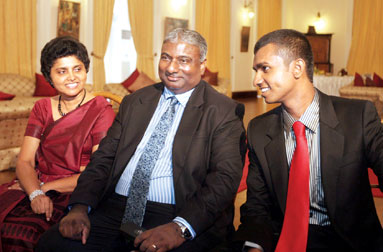
Chief Justice Shirani Bandaranayake, her husband Pradeep Kariyawasam and son.

== Academic career ==
Bandaranayake became a visiting lecturer at the University of Colombo's Faculty of Law in 1981. She held several positions in the department before being appointed Head of the Department of Law in 1987 and also served on the Judicial Service Commission of Sri Lanka. She served as acting dean of the faculty several times before being appointed dean in 1992. In 1993 she became associate professor of Law "on merit". She acted as vice-chancellor on a number of occasions.

== Legal career ==
After her admission to the bar, Bandaranayake worked as an attorney-at-law of the Supreme Court of Sri Lanka. She was controversially appointed to the Supreme Court on 30 October 1996 by President Chandrika Kumaratunga on the recommendation of Mr G. L. Peiris, then Minister of Justice and Constitutional Affairs. She was the first female justice of the Supreme Court. Bandaranayake had never served as a judge and she had never practiced law. Her appointment to the Supreme Court led to protests from lawyers and judges. She soon became the most senior Supreme Court Judge.

Bandaranayake served as acting chief justice on 11 occasions. In 2011 President Mahinda Rajapaksa appointed Bandaranayake as Chief Justice, succeeding Asoka de Silva who retired on 17 May 2011. She took her oaths before President Rajapaksa on 18 May 2011.

=== Impeachment ===
An impeachment motion against Bandaranayake signed by 117 UPFA MPs was handed to Speaker Chamal Rajapaksa on 1 November 2012. Speaker Chamal Rajapaksa revealed the 14 charges against Bandaranayake on 6 November 2012 which included failing to disclose financial interests, abuse of power and disregarding the constitution. Bandaranayake has denied the charges and refused to resign from her position.

An eleven-member parliamentary select committee (PSC) consisting of seven ruling party MPs including Mr.Rajitha Senaratne, Mr. Anura Priyadarshana Yapa, Mr. Susil Premjayante and four opposition MPs was appointed to investigate in to the impeachment charges. Impeachment hearings were held on 23 November 2012, 4 December 2012 and 6 December 2012 when Bandaranayake walked out of the hearing. The opposition MPs withdrew from the PSC on 7 December 2012. The PSC's report was presented to Parliament on 8 December 2012. The PSC found that three of five charges against Bandaranayake had been proven and this was enough to remove her from office. She was found guilty of impropriety in a property transaction (1st charge), having undeclared bank accounts (4th charge) and conflict of interest in a legal case involving her husband (5th charge). She was found guilty on the second and third charges; the remaining nine charges were disregarded by the PSC as the others were enough to remove her from office. Opposition MPs rejected the PSC report, saying "This was not an inquiry it was an inquisition". The PSC's report will now be sent to President Rajapaksa and then Parliament will vote on the impeachment motion in the new year.

The Supreme Court ruled on 1 January 2013 that the PSC had no power to investigate allegations against the chief justice and the impeachment was therefore unconstitutional while she was still in the office because she was dismissed from her position on 13 January 2013. Bandaranayake appealed against the PSC and on 7 January 2013 the Court of Appeal quashed the PSC's findings.

The impeachment motion against Bandaranayake was debated by Parliament on 10 and 11 January 2013. The motion was passed by Parliament with 155 MPs voting for and 49 MPs voting against it. Bandaranayake was removed from office on 13 January 2013 after President Mahinda Rajapaksa ratified the impeachment motion passed by Parliament. Bandaranayake was replaced as chief justice by former Attorney General Mohan Peiris and later on 28 January 2015.

She was reinstated into her office of the Chief Justice by President Maithripala Sirisena after issuing marching orders on her successor, provided that her impeachment was illegal.

=== Legal grounds for reinstatement ===
On 6 November 2013, 116 members of Parliament tabled a motion that sought to set up a Parliamentary Select Committee to investigate on 14 charges that had been brought against her. Accordingly, the PSC was set up and had several sittings. They concluded their inquiry, finding her guilty of 3 of the 14 charges and reported to the Speaker recommending the removal of Dr. Bandaranayake from the Office of the Chief Justice. The Parliament debated the findings on 9 and 10 January 2013 and decided to vote for the impeachment on 11 January 2013.

Due to an error on the part of the government, instead of an address of parliament to the president empowering him to remove the Chief Justice, Parliament on 11 January 2013, voted on a motion of impeachment, that sought to set up a Parliamentary Select Committee to investigate 14 charges that had been brought against her. However, that motion had already been voted upon on 6 November 2012.

On 11 January M. A. Sumanthiran MP, raised the matter and the Speaker adjourned the House for 10 mins to seek clarification. He noted that the original motion seeking to set up a PSC 'would suffice' and proceeded with the vote. Mahinda Rajapaksa ratified the impeachment motion passed by Parliament.

In accordance with Article 107[2] of the Constitution of Sri Lanka, if a judge is found guilty, Parliament must present an address to the president requesting him to remove the judge. However, the motion Parliament sent to President Rajapakse called for the setting up of a second PSC, and it did not empower President Rajapaksa to remove Dr. Bandaranayake according to the terms of the constitution. In essence, President Mahinda Rajapaksa acted without legal authority to remove Bandaranayake, eroding the sacking of its legal validity.

Based on this technical problem, on 27 January 2015, President Sirisena informed Mohan Peiris that the 2013 impeachment of Dr. Bandaranayake was unlawful and as such the appointment of Mohan Peiris was void ab initio. This removed all obstacles for Dr. Bandaranayake to hold her position as the 43rd Chief Justice and paved the way for her to resume duties on 28 January 2015. She resigned from the post on the following day and was succeeded by K. Sripavan, the most senior judge on the Supreme Court.

=== Nauru Court of Appeal ===
Dr. Bandaranayake has been appointed to the Nauru Court of Appeal as acting President of the Court.

Legal offices
Preceded by Asoka de Silva	Chief Justice of Sri Lanka; 2011–2013	Succeeded by Mohan Peiris
Preceded by Mohan Peiris	Chief Justice of Sri Lanka; 2015	Succeeded by K. Sripavan
Order of precedence
Preceded by Chandrika Kumaratunga as Former President	Order of Precedence of Sri Lanka as Chief Justice of Sri Lanka; 2011–2013	Succeeded by Prasanna Ranatunga as Chief Minister of Western Province
