= Shiva Pasupati =

Sri Lankan lawyer (1928–2025)

Deshamanya Shiva Pasupati PC

34th Attorney General of Sri Lanka
- In office 5 June 1975 – 1988
- President: William Gopallawa
- Preceded by: Victor Tennekoon
- Succeeded by: Pandikoralalage Sunil Chandra De Silva

28th Solicitor General of Sri Lanka
- In office 1974–1975
- President: William Gopallawa
- Preceded by: R. S. Wanasundera
- Succeeded by: I. F. B. Wickramanayake

Personal details
- Born: 26 August 1928
- Died: 17 January 2025 (aged 96) Sydney, New South Wales, Australia
- Education: Ananda College; Jaffna Hindu College; University of Ceylon
- Profession: Lawyer
- Ethnicity: Sri Lankan Tamil

Deshamanya Shivakumaran Pasupati (26 August 1928 – 17 January 2025) was a Sri Lankan Tamil lawyer, President's Counsel, Solicitor General and Attorney General.

== Early life and family ==
Pasupati was the son of physician V. T. Pasupati and Kamalambikai. He was educated at the Ananda College and Jaffna Hindu College. After school he joined the University of Ceylon from where he graduated with a degree in law. He then obtained Post-Graduate Diploma in International Law from the University of Cambridge.

== Career ==
Pasupati was Director of Public Prosecutions. He was Solicitor General between 1974 and 1975. He then served as Attorney General from 1975 to 1988. Pasupati was a President's Counsel.

Pasupati was awarded the Deshamanya title, the second highest Sri Lankan national honour, in 1989.

== Later life and death ==
Pasupati moved to Australia and served as a legal advisor for the rebel Liberation Tigers of Tamil Eelam. He took part in the Norwegian peace process between 2002 and 2006.

Pasupati was chairman of Australians for Human Rights of the Voiceless and president of the Tamil Senior Citizens' Association (NSW).

Pasupati died in Sydney, Australia on 17 January 2025, at the age of 96.

Legal offices
Preceded by Victor Tennekoon	Attorney General of Sri Lanka; 1975–1988	Succeeded by Pandikoralalage Sunil Chandra De Silva
Preceded by R. S. Wanasundera	Solicitor General of Sri Lanka; 1974–1975	Succeeded by I. F. B. Wickramanayake
