= Gihan Kulatunga =

Puisne justice of the Supreme Court of Sri Lanka since 2025

The Honourable Gihan Kulatunga

Puisne Justice of the Supreme Court of Sri Lanka
- Incumbent
- Assumed office 10 December 2025
- Appointed by: Anura Kumara Dissanayake

Judge of the Court of Appeal of Sri Lanka
- In office 6 September 2024 – 10 December 2025
- Appointed by: Ranil Wickremesinghe

Judge of the High Court of Sri Lanka
- In office 2012 – 6 September 2024
- Appointed by: Mahinda Rajapaksa

Personal details
- Born: Kulatunga Mudiyanselage Gihan Himanshu Kulatunga
- Parent: K. M. M. B. Kulatunga (father)
- Education: University of Colombo (LL.B); Sri Lanka Law College
- Alma mater: S. Thomas' College, Mount Lavinia

Kulatunga Mudiyanselage Gihan Himanshu Kulatunga is a Sri Lankan lawyer serving since 10 December 2025 as a puisne justice of the Supreme Court of Sri Lanka. He was appointed by President Anura Kumara Dissanayake.

He previously served as judge of the Court of Appeal of Sri Lanka.

== Early life ==
Kulatunga is an alumnus of S. Thomas' College, Mount Lavinia. He graduated from Sri Lanka Law College and the University of Colombo. His father, K. M. M. B. Kulatunga, was a former Solicitor General and a puisne justice of the Supreme Court of Sri Lanka.

== Career ==
Kulatunga joined the Attorney General's Department in 1994 and served until 2012, when he was appointed as a judge of the High Court of Sri Lanka by President Mahinda Rajapaksa. He has also served as a pusine judge in Fiji.

He was nominated as judge of the Court of Appeal of Sri Lanka by then-Chief Justice Jayantha Jayasuriya and was appointed on 6 September 2024 by President Ranil Wickremesinghe.

In October 2025, Chief Justice Padman Surasena recommended Kulatunga for appointment as a puisne justice of the Supreme Court of Sri Lanka. The recommendation was forwarded to President Anura Kumara Dissanayake, who submitted it to the Constitutional Council (CC) for approval. The Constitutional Council approved the recommendation in December 2025.

On 10 December 2025, Kulatunga was appointed to the Supreme Court of Sri Lanka as a puisne justice by President Dissanayake.

=== Commission assignments ===
On 17 April 2026, President Dissanayake appointed a three-member Presidential Commission of Inquiry, chaired by Kulatunga, to investigate coal purchases for electricity generation from the inception of coal-based power in Sri Lanka until 16 April 2026. Adithya Patabendige, judge of the Court of Appeal, and Sanjeewa Somarathna, judge of the High Court, are the other members of the commission.
