= K. M. M. B. Kulatunga =

Sri Lankan puisne justice of the Supreme Court (died 2010)

The Honourable K. M. M. B. Kulatunga PC

Puisne Justice of the Supreme Court of Sri Lanka
- Appointed by: Ranasinghe Premadasa

32nd Solicitor General of Sri Lanka
- In office 1982 – 1989
- Appointed by: J. R. Jayewardene

Personal details
- Born: Kulatunga Mudiyanselage Mutu Banda Kulatunga
- Died: 3 June 2010
- Children: 3, including Gihan Kulatunga
- Education: University of Cambridge; Sri Lanka Law College

Kulatunga Mudiyanselage Mutu Banda Kulatunga (died 3 June 2010) was a Sri Lankan lawyer who served as a puisne justice of the Supreme Court of Sri Lanka. He was appointed by President Ranasinghe Premadasa in 1989.

== Early life ==
Kulatunga is a graduate of Sri Lanka Law College and the University of Cambridge.

== Career ==
Before his elevation to the judiciary, he served as the 32nd Solicitor General of Sri Lanka, having been appointed by President J. R. Jayewardene in 1982. He succeeded V. C. Gunatilleke and held the position until 1989, after which he was succeeded by S. W. B. Wadugodapitiya.

== Personal life and death ==
One of Kulatunga's sons, Gihan Kulatunga, serves as a puisne justice of the Supreme Court.

He died on 3 June 2010 in Colombo, Sri Lanka.

== Works ==
- Kulatunga, K. M. M. B. (1997). A Legal Analysis of the Government Proposals for Constitutional Reforms: An Alternative Solution to the Current Disorder in Sri Lanka. Lakderana Printers and Publishers.
- Kulatunga, K. M. M. B. (2005). Disorder in Sri Lanka. Nidahas Publication. ISBN 978-955-1035-02-0.

Legal offices
Preceded by V. C. Gunatilleke	Solicitor General of Sri Lanka; 1982–1989	Succeeded by S. W. B Wadugodapitiya
