= Solicitor General of Sri Lanka =

Government post

- Sri Lanka
- Incumbent; Viraj Dayaratne since 28 November 2024
- Attorney General's Department
- Nominator: The president
- Appointer: The president; with Constitutional Council advice and consent
- Term length: No fixed term
- Formation: 1884
- First holder: Charles Lambert Ferdinands
- Deputy: Additional solicitors general (5)
- Website: Attorney General's Department

The solicitor general of Sri Lanka is a post subordinate to the attorney general of Sri Lanka. The solicitor general of Sri Lanka assists the attorney general, and is assisted by four additional solicitors general. Note that the post was solicitor general of Ceylon until Sri Lanka became a republic in 1972.

== Salary and entitlements ==
The attorney general draws a monthly salary and pensionable allowance (as at 2017) of Rs 220,000 and other allowances of Rs 290,800. The attorney general is entitled to an official vehicle. The position is pensionable and holders are entitled for government duty free permits.

== List of solicitors general ==
#	Solicitor General	Province	Took office	Left office	Appointed by
Solicitor General of Ceylon (1884-1972)
1	Charles Lambert Ferdinands		1884	1888	Arthur Hamilton-Gordon
2	Charles Layard	Western	1888	1892	Arthur Hamilton-Gordon
3	Ponnambalam Ramanathan		1892	1906	Arthur Havelock
4	James Cecil Walter Pereira		1906	1912	Henry Arthur Blake
5	James Van Langenberg		1912	1915	Henry McCallum
6	Thomas Garvin		1915	1917	Robert Chalmers
7	Stewart Schneider		1917	1917	John Anderson
6	Thomas Garvin		1918	1924	William Manning
8	Maas Thajoon Akbar		1925	1928	Hugh Clifford
9	Stanley Obeysekere		1929	1932	Herbert Stanley
10	L. M. D. de Silva		1932	1935	Graeme Thomson
11	J. W. R. Illangakoon		1935	1935	Reginald Edward Stubbs
12	Arthur Wijewardena		1936	1938	Reginald Edward Stubbs
13	Edward Jayetileke		1939	1940	Andrew Caldecott
14	M. W. H. de Silva		1941	1942	Andrew Caldecott
15	J. M. Fonseka		1943	1945	Andrew Caldecott
16	Hema Henry Basnayake		1946	1947	Henry Monck-Mason Moore
17	M. F. S. Pulle		1948	1950	Henry Monck-Mason Moore
18	Robert Crossette-Thambiah		1950	1951	Herwald Ramsbotham
19	T. S. Fernando		1952	1954	Herwald Ramsbotham
20	D. S. C. B. Jansze		1955	1957	Oliver Ernest Goonetilleke
21	Murugeysen Tiruchelvam		1958	1961	Oliver Ernest Goonetilleke
22	Anthony Alles		1962	1964	William Gopallawa
23	Victor Tennekoon	Central	1965	1967	William Gopallawa
24	Walter Jayawardena		1967	1968	William Gopallawa
25	L. B. T. Premaratne		1968	1970	William Gopallawa
26	Hector Deheragoda		1970	1972	William Gopallawa
Solicitor General of Sri Lanka
27	Raja Wanasundera		1972	1974	William Gopallawa
28	Shiva Pasupati		1974	1975	William Gopallawa
29	I. F. B. Wickramanayake		1975	1977	William Gopallawa
30	Elanga Wikramanayake		1977	1977	William Gopallawa
31	V. C. Gunatilleke		1977	1981	William Gopallawa
32	K. M. M. B. Kulatunga		1982	1989	J. R. Jayewardene
33	S. W. B. Wadugodapitiya		1989	1991	Ranasinghe Premadasa
34	Tilak Marapana	Sabaragamuwa	1991	1992	Ranasinghe Premadasa
35	Shibly Aziz		1992	1994	Ranasinghe Premadasa
36	P. L. D. Premaratne		1994	1996	Chandrika Kumaratunga
37	Upawansa Yapa		1996	1998	Chandrika Kumaratunga
38	Kandapper Kamalasabayon	Eastern	1998	1999	Chandrika Kumaratunga
39	Chitta De Silva	Western	2000	2007	Chandrika Kumaratunga
40	Priyasath Dep		2007	2011	Mahinda Rajapaksa
41	Eva Wansundera	North Western	2011	2011	Mahinda Rajapaksa
42	Palitha Fernando		2011	2012	Mahinda Rajapaksa
43	Yuwanjana Wijayatilake		2012	October 2014	Mahinda Rajapaksa
44	Suhada Gamlath		2 February 2015	February 2018	Maithripala Sirisena
45	Dappula de Livera		February 2018	May 2019	Maithripala Sirisena
46	Dilrukshi Dias		May 2019	October 2019	Maithripala Sirisena
47	Sanjay Rajaratnam		October 2019	May 2021	Gotabaya Rajapaksa
48	Indika Demuni de Silva		September 2021	March 2024	Gotabaya Rajapaksa
49	Ayesha Jinasena		March 2024	November 2024	Ranil Wickramasinghe
50	Viraj Dayaratne		28 November 2024		Anura Kumara Dissanayake

== See also ==
- Chief Justice of Sri Lanka
- Attorney General of Sri Lanka
