= Dilrukshi Dias Wickramasinghe =

46th Solicitor General of Sri Lanka

46th Solicitor General of Sri Lanka
- In office May 2019 – October 2019
- Appointed by: Maithripala Sirisena
- Preceded by: Dappula de Livera
- Succeeded by: Sanjay Rajaratnam

Dilrukshi Dias Wickramasinghe also simply known as Dilrukshi Dias is the 46th Solicitor General of Sri Lanka. She has held several posts during her career including the position of Director General of the Bribery Commission. In September 2019, she involved in controversies regarding the direct links which she maintained with Avant Garde chairman Nissanka Senadhipathi. In October 2019, Sanjay Rajaratnam replaced Dilrukshi Dias as the acting Solicitor General following the controversial phone call with Avant Garde chairman.

== Career ==
Before her appointment as Solicitor General, she served as a high-profile Director General of the Bribery Commission. She was appointed as the 46th SG in May 2019 by Public Service Commission replacing Dappula de Livera. Following her controversy, in October 2019, she was succeeded by Sanjay Rajaratnam as the Solicitor General.

== Controversies ==
In September 2019, she was levelled with allegations regarding the direct contact with corrupted Avant Garde while serving as the Solicitor General. Dilrukshi Dias involved in a controversial telephone conversation with the chairman of Avant Garde, Nissanka Senadhipathi through her Facebook account which was later reported to have been leaked by the Avant Garde chairman himself to the public.

Following the leaked telephone discussion, she criticised the Avant Garde chairman and said that such discussions shouldn't be disclosed to the public while being the government officer. She also urged the chairman to publicly disclose the conversation without editing the contents. Dilrukshi later claimed allegations that one of the ministers in the cabinet was involved in establishing contact between her and the chairman of Avant Garde.

Referring to the facts revealed by Dilrukshi, President Maithripala Sirisena urged her to disclose the name of the minister whom she mentioned and to reveal other politicians who are behind the Avant Garde case.

On a public statement, Maithripala Sirisena made allegations against the Prime Minister Ranil Wickramasinghe for requesting Dilrukshi to be appointed as new Supreme Court judge. The allegation made by him referring to Dilrukshi Dias was later refuted by Ranil Wickramasinghe in a public speech.

Legal offices
Preceded by Dappula de Livera	Solicitor General of Sri Lanka; May 2019 – October 2019	Succeeded by Sanjay Rajaratnam
