= T. B. Dissanayake =

Tikiri Banda (T.B.) Dissanayake PC
- Born: 17 July 1908; Kandy Sri Lanka
- Education: Dharmaraja College, Kandy; Nalanda College Colombo

Tikiri Banda (T.B.) Dissanayake PC (born 17 July 1908, date of death unknown) entered Ceylon University College and obtained a BA degree from London University in 1930, having read Latin, Sinhala, History and Philosophy. He attended Dharmaraja College and Nalanda College, Colombo. After graduating, Dissanayake spent nearly a decade as a teacher at his alma mater Nalanda College Colombo. Later, he entered the Ceylon Law College and was admitted as an advocate of Your Lordship's Court in 1942. Dissanayake also served as a Commissioner of Assize for a short period in 1969-70.
