= Dappula de Livera =

47th Attorney General of Sri Lanka
- In office 10 May 2019 – 26 May 2021
- Appointed by: Maithripala Sirisena
- Preceded by: Jayantha Jayasuriya
- Succeeded by: Sanjay Rajaratnam

Personal details
- Spouse: Marini De Livera
- Education: St. Joseph's College; St. Anthony's College, Kandy; Sri Lanka Law College; University College London; Bandaranaike Centre for International Studies
- Profession: Attorney-At-Law

Dappula de Livera PC is a Sri Lankan lawyer and the former Attorney General of Sri Lanka. He previously served as the Solicitor General of Sri Lanka from February 2018 and took over as acting attorney general from 29 April 2019 until his formal appointment in May 2019.

== Career ==
Educated at St. Joseph's College and St. Anthony's College, Kandy, he studied law at Sri Lanka Law College, taking oaths as an Attorney-at-Law of the Supreme Court of Sri Lanka in 1984.

He joined the Attorney General's Department in 1985 as a State Counsel. He went on to hold the posts of Senior State Counsel, Deputy Solicitor General, Additional Solicitor General, Senior Additional Solicitor General. He had functioned as a Senior Prosecutor and Appellate Counsel for the Republic, Head of the Criminal Division of Attorney General's Department. He had also on secondment served as a State Counsel for the Attorney General's Department of the Republic of Seychelles.

In 2002, he gained an LLM from the University College London and holds a Diploma in International Relations from the Bandaranaike Centre for International Studies. He was appointed as a President's Counsel in 2014.

During his tenure at the Attorney General's Department he had served as a member of the National Commission against the Proliferation of Small Arms and Light Weapons; and the Task Force established by the Ministry of Justice to deal with human smuggling and illegal migration; legal consultant and member of the advisory board of the Financial Intelligence Unit of the Central Bank of Sri Lanka. He had worked as the senior legal counsel to the special presidential commission appointed to inquire into issues relating to the maintenance of law and order and was the chief prosecutor commission of inquiry on bond issuance.

On 18 February 2018, he was appointed Solicitor General and served till 29 April before Dilrukshi Dias Wickramasinghe took over from him. After holding the Solicitor General position, he was appointed as the acting Attorney General after Jayantha Jayasuriya was appointed as Chief Justice of Sri Lanka. His appointment was confirmed on 7 May by the Constitutional Council and was sworn in on 10 May 2019. He retired from the position of Attorney General in May 2021 and was replaced by Sanjay Rajaratnam in the relevant position.

He is married to activist Marini De Livera.

Legal offices
Preceded by Jayantha Jayasuriya	Attorney General of Sri Lanka; 2019–2021	Succeeded by Incumbent
