= Chula De Silva =

Sri Lankan lawyer and politician

R. D. Chula De Silva PC is a Sri Lankan lawyer and politician.

Educated at Royal College Colombo, he gained a B.A. from the University of Ceylon and was awarded a Rhodes Scholarship (to the University of Oxford) where he gained a degree of Bachelor of Civil Law.

He gained prominence as a lawyer being appointed as a President's Counsel and was instrumental in the establishment of the Sihala Urumaya political party.
