= M. Rajendra =

M. Rajendra CCS
- Born: 4 July 1911; British Malaya
- Died: 10 March 1991 (aged 79)
- Education: Ceylon University College
- Occupation: Civil servant
- Title: Treasury Secretary
- Term: 15 November 1968 – 6 May 1971
- Predecessor: H. J. Samarakkody
- Successor: C. A. Coorey

Murugeysen Rajendra (4 July 1911 – 10 March 1991) was a leading Ceylonese civil servant.

== Early life ==
Rajendra was born on 4 July 1911 in British Malaya. He was the son of Visvanathan Murugeysen, who hailed from Vaddukoddai in northern Ceylon, an officer in the British colonial administration, and head of the telegraph office in Kuala Lumpur. Rajendra had his early education at the Victoria Institution before being sent to Ceylon along with his brother Tiruchelvam to study at S. Thomas' College, Mount Lavinia. The brothers were placed under the guardianship of S. J. V. Chelvanayakam. At St. Thomas, he was a close friend of Dudley Senanayake, later Prime Minister. After school Rajendra joined the Ceylon University College, graduating in 1933 with a BA honours degree in history.

Rajendra married Neela, a daughter of G. Wignarajah. They had two sons (Jayantha and Ajita) and a daughter (Malathy).

== Career ==
Rajendra joined the Ceylon Civil Service as a cadet on 12 December 1934. He was Assistant Government Agent in Matara, Hambantota, Chilaw, Kandy, and Nuwara Eliya before becoming Government Agent of Eastern Province (1 August 1949 to 6 March 1950) and Government Agent of North Central Province in 1951. He was Lands and Land Development Commissioner from 1954 to 1959. He was later permanent secretary at the Ministry of Post, Broadcasting and Information, and Ministry of Nationalised Services. He was Treasury Secretary and Head of the Public Service from 1968 to 1971.

== Later life ==
After retirement Rajendra was chairman of the Freedom from Hunger Foundation and a member of the Monetary Board (1971–77). He died on 10 March 1991.
