= L. B. T. Premaratne =

25th Solicitor General of Ceylon
- In office 1968–1970
- Governor General: William Gopallawa
- Preceded by: Walter Jayawardena
- Succeeded by: Hector Deheragoda

Loku Banda Thennehene Premaratne, QC ( known as L.B.T.Premaratne ) was the 25th Solicitor General of Ceylon and acting Attorney General of Ceylon. He was appointed on 1968, succeeding Walter Jayawardena, and held the office until 1970. He was succeeded by Hector Deheragoda.

== Biography ==
Premaratne was born in Katugastota, Kandy, as the eldest son in a family of seven boys all of whom were very good scholars and equally good sportsmen. He was educated at Ananda College where he played cricket as a fast bowler.

Premaratne was a prosecutor in the landmark case of the Assassination of S. W. R. D. Bandaranaike.

Legal offices
Preceded by Walter Jayawardena	Solicitor General of Ceylon; 1968–1970	Succeeded by Hector Deheragoda
