= Jayantha Weerasinghe =

Sri Lankan lawyer and politician from Member of Parliament

Hon. Jayantha Weerasinghe PC
- ජයන්ත වීරසිංහ யந்த வீரசிங்க

Member of the Parliament of Sri Lanka
- Incumbent
- Assumed office 2020
- Constituency: National List

Personal details
- Born: 13 September 1950 (age 76)
- Party: Sri Lanka Podujana Peramuna
- Other political affiliations: Sri Lanka People's Freedom Alliance
- Education: University of Colombo
- Profession: Lawyer

Jayantha Weerasinghe (born 13 September 1950) is a Sri Lankan lawyer, politician and Member of Parliament.

Weerasinghe was born on 13 September 1950. He was educated at Royal College, Colombo. He has a LLB degree from the University of Colombo. He became a President's Counsel in 2010.

Weerasinghe is Prime Minister Mahinda Rajapaksa's legal advisor. Following the 2020 parliamentary election he was appointed to the Parliament of Sri Lanka as a National List MP representing the Sri Lanka People's Freedom Alliance.
