= Yuwanjana Wijayatilake =

Yuwanjan Wijayatilake PC

44th Attorney General of Sri Lanka
- In office 23 October 2014 – 10 January 2016
- President: Mahinda Rajapaksa
- Preceded by: Palitha Fernando
- Succeeded by: Jayantha Jayasuriya

43rd Solicitor General of Sri Lanka
- In office 2012–2014
- President: Mahinda Rajapaksa
- Preceded by: Palitha Fernando

Personal details
- Spouse: Dr. Claire Wijayatilake
- Relations: S. R. Wijayatilake (father); Nanda Wanasundera (mother); Raja Wanasundera (uncle)
- Education: Ananda College, Colombo

Yuwanjan Jawaharlal Wanasundera Wijayatilake PC was the 44th Attorney General of Sri Lanka and 43rd Solicitor General of Sri Lanka.

Wijayatilake became an attorney in 1979 and joined the legal department as an Acting State Counsel in 1980.

Having previously served as the deputy solicitor General and additional solicitor general. He was appointed Solicitor General in 2012, succeeding Palitha Fernando. In 2014 Wijayatilake was made Attorney General of Sri Lanka and served until January 2016 when he retired from the Attorney-General's Department.

Wijayatilake is the son and nephew of the former Supreme Court Justices S. R. Wijayatilake and Raja Wanasundera respectively.

Legal offices
Preceded by Palitha Fernando	Solicitor General of Sri Lanka; 2012–2014	Succeeded by
Preceded by Palitha Fernando	Attorney General of Sri Lanka; 2014–2016	Succeeded by Jayantha Jayasuriya
