= Palitha Fernando =

Rear Admiral Palitha Fernando PC, VNF

43rd Attorney General of Sri Lanka
- In office 17 July 2012 – 23 October 2014
- President: Mahinda Rajapaksa
- Preceded by: Eva Wansundera
- Succeeded by: Yuwanjana Wijayatilake

42nd Solicitor General of Sri Lanka
- In office 2011–2012
- President: Mahinda Rajapaksa
- Preceded by: Eva Wansundera
- Succeeded by: Yuwanjana Wijayatilake

Personal details
- Education: University of Colombo; Sri Lanka Law College; University of Bristol

Rear Admiral Sarath Palitha Fernando, PC, VNF is a Sri Lankan lawyer. He is the former Attorney General of Sri Lanka and had served as Solicitor General of Sri Lanka and Judge Advocate of the Sri Lanka Navy.

== Education ==
Educated at the Royal College Colombo, where he captained the College English and Sinhala debating teams, served as student chairman of the College English Literary Association and general secretary of the Sinhala Literary Association. He also became the President of the Young Zoologists' Association of Sri Lanka in 1976. Entering the Sri Lanka Law College he passed the preliminary and final examinations with First Class Honours, gaining the Prize for Commercial Law and the Hector Jayawardena Gold Medal. He gained an LL.B. from the University of Colombo as an external student and went on to gain two LL.M.s, one in International Law from the University of Colombo and another in International Commercial Law from the University of Bristol.

== Legal career ==
After taking oaths as an attorney at law he joined the Attorney General's Department as an acting State Counsel in 1980, later becoming a Senior State Counsel in 1989 and Deputy Solicitor General in 1997. During this time he prosecuted in several major crime cases.

Having joined the Volunteer Naval Force in 1989 as a Commander, in 2004 he was appointed Judge Advocate of the Sri Lanka Navy, to head its legal branch. He had served as prosecutor and also Judge Advocate at several Courts Martial of all three Services, including the Court-Martial of the Commander Southern Naval Command in 2008.

In 2011, he was appointed Solicitor General and served as acting Attorney General from July 2011 until formal appointment in June 2012. He retired from the post on 23 October 2014.

He is a visiting lecturer at the General Sir John Kotelawala Defence University, Open University of Sri Lanka and a faculty member of Bandaranaike Centre for International Studies.

Legal offices
Preceded by Eva Wansundera	Solicitor General of Sri Lanka; 2011–2012	Succeeded by Yuwanjana Wijayatilake
Preceded by Eva Wansundera	Attorney General of Sri Lanka; 2012 – 2014	Succeeded by Yuwanjana Wijayatilake
