= C. R. De Silva =

Sri Lankan lawyer

Chitta Ranjan De Silva PC

40th Attorney General of Sri Lanka
- In office 2007–2008
- Appointed by: Mahinda Rajapaksa
- Preceded by: K. C. Kamalasabayson
- Succeeded by: Mohan Peiris

39th Solicitor General of Sri Lanka
- In office 2000–2007
- Appointed by: Chandrika Kumaratunga
- Preceded by: K. C. Kamalasabayson
- Succeeded by: Priyasath Dep

Personal details
- Died: 7 November 2013 (aged 65) Colombo, Sri Lanka
- Education: Royal College, Colombo
- Profession: Lawyer

Chitta Ranjan De Silva, PC (died 7 November 2013) was a Sri Lankan lawyer. He was Attorney General and Solicitor General of Sri Lanka. He was the Chairman of the Lessons Learnt and Reconciliation Commission.

Educated at the Royal College, Colombo, where he captained Royal College at Rugby Football in 1968, most notably at the Bradby Shield Encounter and were adjudged school champions. That year he captained the Ceylon Schools Rugby Football team as well. Thereafter he entered the Sri Lanka Law College and was called to the Bar in 1974, starting his legal practice thereafter.

Two years later he joined the Attorney General's Department as a State Counsel in May 1976. In 1984 he was promoted as a Senior State Counsel and was appointed Deputy Solicitor General in October 1992. He took silk as a President's Counsel on February 19, 1997, after being appointed an Additional Solicitor General in December 1996. In October 1999 he was appointed the Solicitor General of Sri Lanka, a post he would hold till 2007. For 10 years since 1997 he was the head of the Criminal Division of the Attorney General's Department. In April 2007 he was appointed the Attorney General of Sri Lanka. He retired in early 2009. During his career as a public prosecutor in the Attorney General's Department he appeared on behalf of the state for some of the most significant criminal cases in the country, involving the assassination of the High Court Judge of Colombo, Sarath Ambepitiya.

De Silva has represented the Government of Sri Lanka in a number of International Bilateral Air Traffic Negotiations held in New Delhi, Australia, Greece and Sri Lanka. He has also been a member of Sri Lankan delegations to the Human Rights Committee under the optional protocol to the International Covenant on Civil and Political Rights and to the United Nations Convention on the Elimination of All Forms of Racial Discrimination.

He has served as a lecturer and examiner at the General Sir John Kotelawala Defence University and was an examiner at the Sri Lanka Law College. He was also a member of the Law Commission of Sri Lanka and had served as a member of the Board of Management of Child Protection Authority, Drug Control Board and the Post Graduate Institute of Medicine.

He died after a long illness on 7 November 2013.

Legal offices
Preceded by Kandapper Kamalasabayon	Attorney General of Sri Lanka; 2007–2008	Succeeded by Mohan Peiris
Preceded by Kandapper Kamalasabayon	Solicitor General of Sri Lanka; 2000–2007	Succeeded by Priyasath Dep
