= M. B. W. Mediwake =

Sri Lankan politician and educator

Mutu Banda Weerasekera Mediwake was a Sri Lankan educator and politician. He served as the Minister of Local Government and Housing, Member of Parliament and Member of Senate of Ceylon.

Mediwake gained a Teachers' Training Certificate (First Class) in English and Sinhalese and went on the serve as the Principal of Vidyartha College, Kandy. During World War II, he served as the chief civilian liaison officer of the Headquarters of the Allied Land Forces South East Asia in Kandy.

He was elected to the House of Representatives from the Minipe Electoral District in the 1956 general election. He was appointed Parliamentary Secretary to the Minister of Local Government and Cultural Affairs by S. W. R. D. Bandaranaike and in November 1959 he was appointed Minister of Local Government and Housing succeeding Vimala Wijewardene when she was dismissed from the cabinet of ministers following her arrest in connection to the Bandaranaike assassination. He served till March 1960 and was appointed to the Senate of Ceylon. He established the Kandyan Scholarship Fund.
