= Sunil de Silva =

Attorney General of Sri Lanka (1941–2021)

35th Attorney General of Sri Lanka
- In office 1988–1992
- President: J. R. Jayewardene
- Preceded by: Shiva Pasupati
- Succeeded by: Tilak Marapana

Personal details
- Born: 30 January 1941 Colombo, Ceylon
- Died: 28 February 2021 (aged 80) Gosford, Australia

Pandikoralalage Sunil Chandra de Silva (30 January 1941 – 28 February 2021) was the 35th Attorney General of Sri Lanka. He was appointed in 1988, succeeding Shiva Pasupati, and held the office until 1992. He was succeeded by Tilak Marapana.

Legal offices
Preceded by Shiva Pasupati	Attorney General of Ceylon; 1988–1992	Succeeded by Tilak Marapana
