= T. S. Fernando =

Thusew Samuel Fernando CBE, QC

Puisne Justice of the Supreme Court of Ceylon
- In office 1956–1968

Solicitor General of Ceylon
- In office 1953–1956

Personal details
- Born: 5 August 1906
- Education: University of London, Royal College Colombo
- Profession: Barrister

Thusew Samuel Fernando, CBE, QC (born 5 August 1906) was a Sri Lankan lawyer and judge. He was a Puisne Justice of the Supreme Court of Ceylon and Solicitor General of Ceylon.

== Education ==
Fernando was educated at the Royal College, Colombo and at the University of London where he gained an LL.B. degree. He was called to the bar as a barrister from the Lincoln's Inn. On his return to Ceylon, he was called to the bar as an advocate on 17 November 1931 and started his legal practice in the unofficial bar.

== Legal career ==
He joined the Attorney General's Department on 5 June 1938 when he was appointed a Crown Counsel, having acted as a Crown Counsel on several occasions between August 1936 to June 1938. He served on several occasions as an acting Senior Crown Counsel, before he was promoted to Senior Crown Counsel on 28 September 1949. He was appointed Acting Solicitor General on 29 August 1952 and confirmed as Solicitor General of Ceylon on 10 August 1953. He was appointed a Queen's Counsel in 1953 and a Commander of the Order of the British Empire (CBE) in the 1955 New Year Honours.

== Judicial career ==
Stepping down was Solicitor General in 1956, he was made a judge Supreme Court of Ceylon. During his tenure he was appointed to the first Trial at Bar following the 1962 coup d'état attempt, he delivered the decision said that in the court’s view the nomination of judges was essentially a judicial function and nowhere in the constitution was that power handed over to a body outside the judicature as bench was nominated by the Minister of Justice. He retired from the bench in 1968. In 1982 he headed the Constitutional Court.

== Later work ==
He was also appointed the first Chairman of Commercial Bank of Ceylon and later on appointed as the High Commissioner of Sri Lanka to Canberra, Australia.
