= Mark Fernando =

Sri Lankan judge

Mark Damien Hugh Fernando, PC (27 February 1941 – 20 January 2009) was a jurist and former judge of the Supreme Court of Sri Lanka. He died after a long bout with cancer on 20 January 2009. He was known as a Judge who stood up for judicial independence and the integrity of the profession.

Justice Mark Fernando helped groom a generation of capable and honourable lawyers. During the early 1990s, when he was a member of the Council of Legal Education, Justice Fernando initiated the Legal Internship Scheme to assist law students awaiting the results of the final examination to qualify as attorneys-at-law. He believed that in order to provide sound legal advice an attorney must have a working knowledge of other disciplines besides law: for instance, he would point out that a lawyer asked by a client to advise on setting up a company must have some knowledge of finance, accountancy, human resource management, etc., in addition to being familiar with the provisions of the Companies Act. Since it was not possible to provide all that knowledge within the structure of education that existed at the Law College at the time, the Internship Scheme sought to place law students for a period of six months in the private sector, and with senior practitioners specialising in various aspects of law.

Following his elevation to the Supreme Court in 1988 he became a firm defender of the rights and liberties guaranteed by the fundamental rights chapter of the Constitution. His judgments on the right to free speech, its relationship to the right to information, and his strong defence of the right of citizens to criticize and peacefully protest against their government are cited often.

Justice Mark Fernando was posthumously conferred a ‘Special Award of Excellence for a Lifetime of Integrity’ at Transparency International Sri Lanka's annual National Integrity Awards.

== Education and early career ==
Fernando was born in a family with a long judicial tradition on 27 February 1941. His father was former Chief Justice H. N. G. Fernando and his grandfather, Judge V. M. Fernando also sat on the Supreme Court. He schooled at St. Joseph's College, Colombo 10, and attended the University of Ceylon, Peradeniya. He took his oaths as an advocate of the Supreme Court in July 1963. Fernando first worked in the chambers of H. W. Jayawardene, QC. He shone as an advocate and was conferred Silk in January 1985. He was known to have been one of the lawyers who drafted the 1978 Constitution of President J.R Jayawardene.

== Family ==
Fernando and his wife Pam had three children, a daughter Tanya, and two sons Sohan and Suren.

== Human rights defender ==
Fernando was responsible for delivering many judgments during his career, that upheld the rights of citizens in respect of the right to vote, the right to freedom of speech and the right to freedom against torture and arbitrary arrest and detention.

At the death of Justice Mark Fernando, the Alumni Association of the Faculty of Law (AAFL) issuing a special message stated that "No other judge has perhaps contributed as much towards the progress of legal jurisprudence in this country as Justice Fernando. From Public Law to Fundamental Rights, from Property to Criminal Law, his razor-sharp intellect has produced judgments that are masterprices of contemporary critical legal thinking".

== Resignation ==
In 2005, Fernando opted to take premature retirement from the Supreme Court, two and half years before his term ended. He was then the longest serving judge on the bench.

Towards the end of his career, Chief Justice Sarath N. Silva had excluded him from hearings relating to the constitutionality of bills before the Parliament. A massive signature campaign was launched to persuade Fernando to stay on to complete his term. Signatories covered a wide range of the political spectrum, lawyers and law students as well as the ecclesiastical heads of the Buddhist, Catholic, Anglican and Methodist denominations.

The Asian Human Rights Commission, issuing a statement on the resignation of Justice Mark Fernando, warned that a senior judge of the Supreme Court of Sri Lanka, retiring two and half years earlier before his stipulated date of retirement, indicates a dangerous phenomena beginning to emerge, which is a sure sign of the erosion of independent judiciary and the Rule of Law in the country.

== Bibliography ==
- Habin, Haroon (2000). "Calls for Strengthening Judiciary in SAARC States." The Hindu.
- Sorabjee, Soli (1999). "Out of Court: Sri Lankan Judiciary, Tagore & the Millennium." The Times of India. December 5.
