= Monarchy of Ceylon =

Monarchy of Ceylon may refer to:

- Monarchy of Ceylon (1948–1972), the period of Sri Lankan history, during which the Dominion of Ceylon shared a monarch with the United Kingdom.
- The Sinhalese monarchy
- Sri Lankan monarchs
- List of Sri Lankan monarchs
