= Attorneys in Sri Lanka =

An Attorney at law (or attorney-at-law) in Sri Lanka is the only legal practitioners authorised to represent others in all court of law in the island and are also authorised to give advice regarding any matter of law. Alternative terms include lawyer.

== History ==
In 1833 the Supreme Court of Ceylon was allowed by Section 17 of the Charter of 1833, to "admit and enroll as Advocates and Proctors, persons of good repute and of competent knowledge and ability upon examination by one or more of the judges of the Supreme Court". Since then there were two groups of legal practitioners in Sri Lanka before 1974 as advocates and proctors, when the Administration of Justice Law (No. 44 of 1973) was enacted by the National State Assembly in 1973.

=== Proctors ===
Since 1833 to 1973, there had been two types of proctors; proctors of the supreme court and proctors of a district court. The former, been appointed by the supreme court following a prescribed course of study at the Ceylon Law College could practice in any court in the island; while the latter, been appointed by a district judge was allowed to practice in the lower courts in that specific judicial district. By 1973, proctors of the district courts have become increasingly rare with proctors of the supreme court becoming the norm. The Attorney General was authorized a proctor from each district to serve as the Crown Proctor to instruct or brief crown counsel on civil and criminal cases in district courts, courts of requests and police courts on behalf of the Crown. Proctors would maintain offices or establish legal firms (as partnerships) that clients would directly access. The instructing proctor would conduct litigation and engage the services of an advocate to represent their clients in court, by providing them with a brief.

=== Advocates ===
Most advocates, qualified after completing the advocate course at the Ceylon Law College, which at times included some years in the Ceylon University College or completing the advocates exams following their graduation from University. British qualified barristers could directly take oaths as advocates. As in England with barristers and solicitors, advocates practice case law from their chambers with limited access to clients and acted on instructions of a proctor, having rights of audience in the higher courts. They had no power to act as notary-publics. Until 1972, senior advocates were nominated to be appointed as Queen's Counsels. Advocates often considered themselves superior to proctors, yet proctors controlled the work they sent to which advocates.

=== Attorneys-at-law ===
Following the enactment of the Administration of Justice Law No. 44 of 1973 by Minister of Justice, Felix Dias Bandaranaike, introduced a single group of lawyers called Attorneys-at-law withboth advocates and proctors were enrolled as attorneys-at-law of the Supreme Court. Those attorneys engaging the practice of courtroom advocacy and litigation, as did advocates in the past are referred to as counselor while other attorneys engaged in all kinds of legal work. Counselor are retained by instructing attorneys on behalf of their clients and manages the case work. Queen's Counsels were replaced by the title of Senior Attorneys-at-Law, which was intern replaced in 1984 by President J. R. Jayewardene with the title of President's Counsel that restored some of the previlages enjoyed by Queen's Counsels by the Eighth Amendment to the Constitution of Sri Lanka. In 2023, the title of Senior Instructing Attorneys-at-Law was introduced by President Ranil Wickramasinghe by the Conferring the Honour of Senior Instructing Attorneys-at-Law Act, No. 26 of 2023.

== Education and training ==
To practice law in Sri Lanka one must be admitted and enrolled as an Attorney-at-Law of the Supreme Court of Sri Lanka. This is achieved by passing law exams at the Sri Lanka Law College which are administered by the Council of Legal Education and spending a period of six months under a practicing attorney of at least eight years standing as an articled clerk. To undertake law exams students must gain admission to the Sri Lanka Law College and study law or directly undertake exams after gaining an LL.B from a local or foreign university. Members of Parliament may gain admission to the Sri Lanka Law College to qualify as lawyers.

== Appointments ==
There are several appointments that attorneys can apply for or be granted by the government;

- Judge
- President's Counsel
- Justice of the Peace and Unofficial Magistrate
- Law Officers
- Notary public
- Commissioner for Oaths
- Company secretary
- Inquirer into Sudden Deaths

== Court attire ==
Sri Lankan attorneys are required to wear robes and other items of court dress when they appear in court. Male attorneys, must wear a black coat, dark trousers, white shirt and black tie, they are also permitted to where white trousers or white National dress and also a black sherwani. Sherwanis and white trousers are uncommon. Lady lawyers commonly wear white saree. Black gown (robes) must be worn before the Superior Courts (the Court of Appeal and Supreme Court) and are optional in other courts and are worn per custom.

Prior to 1974, advocates wore the court dress of barristers with horsehair wig (ceremonial occasions), stiff collar, bands, and a gown; while proctors wore black coat and white trousers. Following the creation of the profession of attorneys in 1974 to reforms of it in 1977, all judges and attorneys wore black coats, dark trousers. Since then the current practice continues.

== Regulation ==
Attorneys are regulated by the Bar Association of Sri Lanka, with a preliminary inquiry under taken by a disciplinary committee appointed by the Chief Justice per the Judicature Act.

== See also ==
- Judicial system of Sri Lanka
