= Senior Instructing Attorneys-at-Law =

Professional title in Sri Lanka

A Senior Instructing Attorneys-at-Law (postnominal SIA) is an eminent lawyer who is appointed by the President of Sri Lanka having had an active practice as an Instructing Attorney (formally known as Proctor) for over twenty years on the observations of the Chief Justice and the Minister of Justice under the provisions of the Conferring the Honour of Senior Instructing Attorneys-at-Law Act, No. 26 of 2023.
