= H. B. Rambukwella =

Ceylonese politician

Herath Ekanayake Wasala Mudianselage Herath Banda Rambukwella (13 October 1885 – 1961) was a Ceylonese politician.

Rambukwella was elected as an independent member at the 1st parliamentary election, held between 23 August 1947 and 20 September 1947, in the Minipe electorate, securing 68.84% of the total vote, 8,640 votes ahead of his nearest rival.

He retained his seat at the 2nd parliamentary election held between 24 May 1952 and 30 May 1952, this time as the United National Party candidate, with a 68.49% majority, 6,701 votes more than his nearest rival.
