= Minipe Electoral District =

Electoral district of Sri Lanka

Minipe electoral district was an electoral district of Sri Lanka between August 1947 and July 1977. The district was named after the town of Minipe in Kandy District, Central Province. The 1978 Constitution of Sri Lanka introduced the proportional representation electoral system for electing members of Parliament. The existing 160 mainly single-member electoral districts were replaced with 22 multi-member electoral districts. Minipe electoral district was replaced by the Kandy multi-member electoral district at the 1989 general elections, the first under the proportional representation system.

== Members of Parliament ==
Key

Independent SLFP UNP

Election	Member	Party	Term
1947	H. B. Rambukwella	Independent	
1952	H. B. Rambukwella	United National Party	
1956	M. B. W. Mediwake	Sri Lanka Freedom Party	
1960 (March)	Reginald Tennekoon	United National Party	
1960 (July)	Reginald Tennekoon	United National Party	
1965	H. M. Navaratne	Sri Lanka Freedom Party	
1970	H. M. Navaratne	Sri Lanka Freedom Party	

== Elections ==
=== 1947 Parliamentary General Election ===
Results of the 1st parliamentary election held between 23 August 1947 and 20 September 1947:

Candidate	Party	Symbol	Votes	%
H. B. Rambukwella		Elephant	12,290	68.84
S. P. Situnayake		Hand	3,650	20.44
K. B. Mediwake		Star	1,437	8.05
Valid Votes			17,377	97.33
Rejected Votes			477	2.67
Total Polled			17,854	100.00
Registered Electors			28,295	
Turnout				63.01

=== 1952 Parliamentary General Election ===
Results of the 2nd parliamentary election held between 24 May 1952 and 30 May 1952:

Candidate	Party	Symbol	Votes	%
H. B. Rambukwella		Umbrella	10,696	68.49
P. B. Wijeratne		Lamp	3,905	25.00
K. B. Mediwake		Star	667	4.27
Valid Votes			15,268	97.77
Rejected Votes			349	2.23
Total Polled			15,617	100.00
Registered Electors			22,932	
Turnout				68.10

=== 1956 Parliamentary General Election ===
Results of the 3rd parliamentary election held between 5 April 1956 and 10 April 1956:

Candidate	Party	Symbol	Votes	%
M. B. W. Mediwake	Sri Lanka Freedom Party	Hand	11,093	62.45
Reginald Wilfred Tennekoon	United National Party	Elephant	6,445	36.28
Valid Votes			17,538	98.73
Rejected Votes			225	1.27
Total Polled			17,763	100.00
Registered Electors			27,303	
Turnout				65.06

=== 1960 (March) Parliamentary General Election ===
Results of the 4th parliamentary election held on 19 March 1960:

Candidate	Party	Symbol	Votes	%
Reginald Wilfred Tennekoon	United National Party	Elephant	3,868	44.96
H. M. Navaratne	Sri Lanka Freedom Party	Hand	3,430	39.87
K. B. Mediwake		Ladder	560	6.51
P. Jayasekera		Sun	429	4.99
A. M. P. Banda		Umbrella	100	1.16
H. M. Herath Banda		Cartwheel	93	1.08
Valid Votes			8,480	98.56
Rejected Votes			124	1.44
Total Polled			8,604	100.00
Registered Electors			11,944	
Turnout				72.04

=== 1960 (July) Parliamentary General Election ===
Results of the 5th parliamentary election held on 20 July 1960:

Candidate	Party	Symbol	Votes	%
Reginald Wilfred Tennekoon	United National Party	Elephant	4,833	52.46
H. M. Navaratne	Sri Lanka Freedom Party	Hand	4,293	46.60
Valid Votes			9,126	99.07
Rejected Votes			86	0.93
Total Polled			9,212	100.00
Registered Electors			11,944	
Turnout				77.13

=== 1965 Parliamentary General Election ===
Results of the 6th parliamentary election held on 22 March 1965:

Candidate	Party	Symbol	Votes	%
H. M. Navaratne	Sri Lanka Freedom Party	Hand	7,042	51.86
A. P. Karunatilake	United National Party	Elephant	6,068	44.68
K. A. Nissanka		Cartwheel	188	1.38
Bernard Madugalle		Chair	169	1.24
Valid Votes			13,467	99.17
Rejected Votes			113	0.83
Total Polled			13,580	100.00
Registered Electors			15,647	
Turnout				86.79

=== 1970 Parliamentary General Election ===
Results of the 7th parliamentary election held on 27 May 1970:

Candidate	Party	Symbol	Votes	%
H. M. Navaratne	Sri Lanka Freedom Party	Hand	10,443	59.15
Bernard Madugalle	United National Party	Elephant	7,115	40.30
Valid Votes			17,558	99.46
Rejected Votes			96	0.54
Total Polled			17,654	100.00
Registered Electors			19,775	
Turnout				89.27
