= Shibly Aziz =

Sri Lankan lawyer (1942/1943–2018)

Shibly Aziz PC

37th Attorney General of Sri Lanka
- In office 1995–1996
- President: Chandrika Kumaratunga
- Preceded by: Tilak Marapana
- Succeeded by: Sarath N. Silva

Personal details
- Born: 1942 or 1943
- Died: 8 October 2018 (aged 74–75)

Mohamed Shibly Aziz PC (1942 or 1943 – 8 October 2018) was a Sri Lankan lawyer. He served as Attorney General of Sri Lanka from 1995 to 1996 and served in the Constitution Council of Sri Lanka from 2015 to 2018.

== Education ==
Educated at Royal College, Colombo from 1954 to 1963, he graduated with an LL.B. with Honours from the University of Ceylon in Peradeniya. Thereafter, he proceeded to the United Kingdom and obtained an LL.M. from the University of London and Diploma in Shipping and Maritime Law and Diploma in Air and Space Law from the London Institute of World Affairs.

== Legal career ==
=== Attorney-General's department ===
Shibly Aziz took oaths in 1968 as an Advocate and was in 1969 appointed a Crown Counsel in the Attorney-General's Department. Having become a State Counsel in 1972, when Sri Lanka became a republic, he was appointed President's Counsel in 1988 while he was holding the substantive post of Deputy Solicitor General, unique in the Attorney General's Department. He was promoted to Solicitor General in 1992, and served as Attorney-General from 1995 to 1996. On his retirement he had served in the department for 27 years.

He served both the criminal as well as the civil side of the department, but his forte was civil law where he was handpicked to lead the State in several important landmark cases, including appearing in the 13th Amendment Case before the Supreme Court as Junior Counsel to the then Attorney General. During his service in the Attorney General's Department, Shibly Aziz, among his other functions, advised the Government in Air and Space Law and on Sri Lanka's international commitments in aviation law such as compliance with ICAO standards and recommended practices. He also negotiated several bilateral air services agreements on behalf of the Government, having participated in over 35 bilateral discussions between Sri Lanka and about 15 countries and in several airline-to-airline discussions on behalf of the Government. He facilitated the implementation of changes in the administration and operational systems relating to Colombo International Airport.

Shibly Aziz represented Sri Lanka in a number of international fora, including as the Chief Delegate at the second International Air Transport Conference 1980 ICAO held in Montreal and as a member of the Sri Lanka Delegation to the Conference of the Attorneys General of Asia and the Pacific, held in Colombo in 1985 and in Seoul in 1990.

Shibly Aziz also served as a consultant in International Relations and Legal at Airlanka Limited, the national carrier, from 1990 to 1994. He was appointed Director, Airport and Aviation Services Limited (Airport Authority) from 1985 to 1994.

He was also instrumental in drafting legislation in the country, particularly air navigation laws such as the extensive amendments made to the Air Navigation Ordinance.

=== Private practice ===
Since his retirement as Attorney General of Sri Lanka in 1996, he had been in active private practice in the Appellate Courts and the Commercial High Court of Colombo where he specialised in administrative and fundamental rights matters, shipping law, aviation law, contracts entered into with international agencies and multinational corporations relating to joint venture projects with the Government and/or public entities in Sri Lanka; loan agreements with foreign lending organisations; privatisation agreements; securities law; and commercial law. He was appointed an independent expert witness on public law in a series of international arbitrations concerning the hedging disputes that were instituted against the Government by a number of international banks.

Shibly Aziz participated in several arbitration matters as a litigator including an arbitration conducted before the International Centre for the Settlement of Investment Disputes (Washington, USA) and an arbitration dispute which is regarded as arising out of one of the largest claims against the Government of Sri Lanka. He frequently served as an arbitrator in arbitrations held in Colombo, Sri Lanka.

Recently, he participated in two high profile and prestigious international arbitrations, both in the capacity of an expert witness. The first set of arbitrations was conducted in Singapore and London with respect to three claims made by international banks against the Sri Lanka Government arising out of hedging operations entered into by the Ceylon Petroleum Corporation. The other was an international arbitration conducted in Singapore between the Maldivian Government and GMR, an airport developer in India. He gave evidence at the arbitrations with respect to certain aspects of Sri Lankan and Maldivian Law. He was also an arbitrator for another international arbitration conducted at KLRCA Malaysia relating to a contractual claim. This is in addition to other arbitrations conducted in Sri Lanka where he regularly functioned as an arbitrator.

=== National Commissions ===
Shibly Aziz was a member of the Sri Lanka Law Commission from 1994 to 2003 and 2011 to 2015 and a member of the Council of Legal Education from 1992 to 1996 and 2012. He was also Chairman of the Civil Aviation Authority of Sri Lanka from 2003 to 2005. He was once again appointed Chairman of the Civil Aviation Authority in 2015 in recognition of his wide knowledge of the subject. In July 2015, he was appointed by the President on the nomination of Parliament to the Constitutional Council in terms of the 19th Amendment to the Constitution of Sri Lanka as a member to represent civil society, with two other civil society representatives.

=== Academic contributions ===
Shibly Aziz was a lecturer at Sri Lanka Law College from 1982 to 1988 and a lecturer in shipping and aviation law at the postgraduate diploma course in Trade and Investment Law of the University of Colombo.

He also authored a number of academic publications including co-authoring Administrative Law & Law of Public Corporations in 1985 for the Open University of Sri Lanka, and conference papers such as "Enjoyment of Fundamental Rights – Limitation, problems and experiences in Sri Lanka Since 1978" presented to the American Studies Association of Sri Lanka at the Seminar on Constitutions of the US and Sri Lanka – a Comparative Study– held in 1987; "Winding Up Procedures in Company Law" presented at the Seminar on Company Law in 1994 held in Colombo; and "Admiralty Law in Sri Lanka – its history and application" – presented in 1994 by the Ceylon Association of Ship's Agents (CASA).

=== Service to the Bar ===
Shibly Aziz was voted into office as the president of the Bar Association of Sri Lanka in 2010 and served his maximum tenure in office until 2012. During his tenure in office, Shibly Aziz was recognized as one of the most apolitical presidents the association has had, emphasizing in his campaign the need to remove bipartisan politics from the association and the need for de-politicization of the issues of the legal system of the country.

Representing the interests of almost 15,000 lawyers in the country as president of the Bar Association of Sri Lanka, Shibly Aziz was keen to develop the image of the Sri Lankan legal system domestically and internationally as a credible, efficient, and transparent system.

With the help of United Nations Development Programme (UNDP), Shibly Aziz and the executive council of the Bar Association facilitated the development of courtrooms outside of Colombo, organised skills development opportunities for court staff, and facilitated a number of national and international conferences and seminars to enhance the professional expertise of lawyers across districts and to reinforce a positive image of the country's legal system among international bar associations. Among such conferences that Shibly Aziz contributed to organize were the first AIJA (International Association of Young Lawyers), International Legal Process Outsourcing conference held in Sri Lanka; and the LawAsia Business Law Conference, which was held for the second time in Sri Lanka, in 2012.

== Death and legacy ==
Aziz died on 8 October 2018, at the age of 75.

In honor of Aziz, a bust of him was unveiled at Colombo Law Library.

Legal offices
| Preceded by Tilak Marapana | Attorney General of Sri Lanka; 1995–1996 | Succeeded by Sarath N. Silva |
