= President's Counsel =

Professional title in Sri Lanka

A president's counsel (postnominal PC) is an eminent lawyer who is appointed by the President of Sri Lanka as an individual "learned in the law". The term is an honorific that replaced the Queen's Counsel (QC), which Sri Lanka ceased appointing when it became a republic in 1972. It is equivalent to the appointment of a King's Counsel in the United Kingdom and other Commonwealth realms, and that of Senior Counsel in Commonwealth republics, bearing the same privileges, such as sitting within the Bar of court.

The professional rank of being a President's Counsel is a status conferred by the President under Article 33 of the Constitution of Sri Lanka. It does not entail the titleholder being employed by the President or state. Appointments are made from lawyers who have practiced as counsel in original and appellate courts for many years either in the official or unofficial bar. Holders of the title of President's Counsel appointed to the judiciary do not lose the title.

Since 2023, the President makes appointments of Senior Instructing Attorneys-at-Law.

== Appointment ==
The appointment is made by the President of Sri Lanka by letters patent, thereafter the appointed President's Counsel takes the oath of office at a ceremonial sitting of the Supreme Court of Sri Lanka at which point the appointee is considered a President's Counsel and are called to the Inner Bar.

Law officers who are public prosecutors of the Attorney General's Department are customarily appointed as President's Counsel after they are promoted to the grade of Additional Solicitor General. These may be singular appointments made several times a year after their promotion. Once in several years, several attorneys from the unofficial bar will be appointed based on recommendations forwarded by the Chief Justice, Attorney General, and the President of the Bar Association of Sri Lanka (BASL) to the President.

== History ==
In 1903, Frederick Dornhorst, Ponnambalam Ramanathan and Thomas De Sampayo were sworn in as the first King's Counsels in the island of Ceylon, which was a British colony at the time. Since then eminent lawyers who were advocates were appointed as King's Counsel until the title changed to Queen's Counsel with the change of monarch in 1952. When Ceylon became a republic in 1972, appointments of QCs were no longer possible, and the equivalent of "Senior Attorney-at-Law" was used.

In 1984, President J. R. Jayewardene the Eighth Amendment to the Constitution of Sri Lanka granted the President powers to appoint "as President's Counsel, attorneys-at-law who have reached eminence in the profession and have maintained high standards of conduct and professional rectitude." It also grants President's Counsel "all such privileges as were hitherto enjoyed by Queen's Counsel". The holder can use the post-nominal letters PC after his or her name.

== Criticism and reform ==
Although recommendations are made by the Chief Justice, Attorney General, and the President of the Bar Association of Sri Lanka; per the Eighth Amendment, the appointments are wholly within the gift of the President. Criticism has been made following the appointment of 75 President's Counsels by President Maithripala Sirisena between 2017 and 2019. This had been after the Bar Association introduced a set of guidelines for appointing PCs in April 2016, which was based on the constitution's Article 33(2)(e) which states that PCs should be "Attorneys-at-law who have reached eminence in the profession and have maintained high standards of conduct and professional rectitude".

Subsequently, new guidelines were issued in 2021, to regulate the appointment of PCs, aiming towards a more uniform and fair system. On 22 November 2021, the Gazette was issued by the Secretary to the President, P.B. Jayasundera. On 23 December 2023 President Ranil Wickremasinghe appointed 10 President's Counsel based on the above criteria. One year later, President Anura Kumara Dissanayake granted the patent to two Additional Solicitors General who are ex officio entitled to be made President's Counsel.

=== Current Criteria to be Appointed (As of 2021) ===
As per the new Guidelines, appointments of PCs should be limited to a maximum of 1 batch per year, and The number of PCs appointed per year should not exceed 10.

- To be appointed as a President's Counsel in Sri Lanka, you must be a qualified lawyer registered with the Supreme Court of Sri Lanka.
- You must have reached a high level of eminence and maintained professional conduct of the highest standard.
- You should have made significant contributions to the legal profession as a subject specialist at a senior level, either in Sri Lanka or internationally, and brought honor to Sri Lanka.
- You must have a good reputation and character and have been a taxpayer registered with the Department of Inland Revenue for at least 5 years.
- Training several junior lawyers who have made meaningful contributions to the profession, as well as authoring books or publications on law, are also considered as added merits.
- Normally, you must have been an Attorney-at-Law for at least 20 years to be eligible, however in exceptional cases, 15 years may suffice if other criteria are met.
- The President may consult the Chief Justice and the Attorney General before making appointments.

== Notable President's Counsels ==
- Neville Abeyratne
- Ranjit Abeysuriya
- L. M. K. Arulanandam
- M. H. M. Ashraff
- Lalith Athulathmudali
- Shibly Aziz
- K. Balapatabendi
- Sinha Basnayake
- Harsha Cabral
- K. N. Choksy
- G. Nihal Fernando
- Prasantha Lal De Alwis
- Dappula de Livera
- C. R. De Silva
- Chula De Silva
- Manohara De Silva
- Romesh De Silva
- A. C. (Bunty) de Zoysa
- T. B. Dissanayake
- Uditha Egalahewa
- Mark Fernando
- Palitha Fernando
- Tyronne Fernando
- Suhada Gamalath
- A. Gnanathasan
- R. K. W. Goonesekera
- Denzil Jayalath Gunaratne
- V. C. Gunatilleke
- Kalinga Indatissa
- Farzana Jameel
- Sarath Jayamanne
- Jayantha Jayasuriya
- Upul Jayasuriya
- K. V. Nihal Jayawardena
- Priyantha Jayawardena
- Lakshman Kadirgamar
- K. C. Kamalasabayson
- K. Kanag-Isvaran
- Palitha Kumarasinghe
- Tilak Marapana
- Saleem Marsoof
- Faisz Musthapha
- Faiszer Musthapha
- R. I. Obeyesekere
- Shiva Pasupati
- A. Rohan Perera
- Daya Perera
- Eardley Perera
- Mohan Peiris
- Saliya Pieris
- Wijeyadasa Rajapakshe
- Kuvera de Zoysa
- Ali Sabry
- Abdul Wahid Abdul Sathar
- Maureen Seneviratne
- Sarath N. Silva
- S. Sriskandarajah
- M. A. Sumanthiran
- A. R. Surendran
- Neelan Tiruchelvam
- C. V. Vigneswaran
- S. W. B. Wadugodapitiya
- Eva Wanasundera
- Mohan Weerakoon
- Jayantha Weerasinghe
- Ananda Wijesekera
- Lukshan Mahinda Wijesurendra
- Upawansa Yapa
- Razik Zarook
- M. M. Zuhair
- Dr Shivaji Felix
- Harsha Fernando
- Viran Corea
- Mohamed Adamaly
- Chamatha Unamboowe
- Kaushalya Navarathna
- Dr Asanga Gunawansa
- Upul Kumarapperuma
- Eraj de Silva
- Faisza Markar
- Shanil Kularathna
- Dileepa Pieris

== List of Senior Attorneys-at-Law ==
In 1984 Senior Attorneys-at-Law were reappointed as PCs.

- H. L. de Silva
- Elmo Nimal Patrick Senanayake
