= Unofficial Bar =

Lawyers engaged in private practice

The unofficial bar in Sri Lankan courts refer to the lawyers engaged in a private legal practice, as opposed to the official bar, which is made up of lawyers working for the Attorney-General's Department. The President of the Bar Association of Sri Lanka is considered as the de facto leader of the unofficial bar. While the Attorney-General is considered as the leader of the official bar.

== See also ==
- Unofficial magistrate
