= Heads of state of Sri Lanka =

The head of state of Sri Lanka is the president. The office has existed since 1972 with the establishment of a Republican government under the 1972 Constitution. However for most of its history, from 543 BC the head of state has been a monarch.

== Monarchical Sri Lanka (543 BC–1972) ==
=== Sinhalese monarchy (543 BC–1815) ===
The Sinhalese monarch was the head of state of the Sinhala Kingdom. The monarch held absolute power and succession was hereditary. The monarchy comprised the reigning monarch, his or her family, and the royal household which supports and facilitates the monarch in the exercise of his royal duties and prerogatives. The monarchy existed for over 2300 years. Tambapanni and its successive kingdoms were situated in what is presently Sri Lanka. The monarchy ended with Sri Vikrama Rajasinha of Kandy in 1815 after generations of European influences and upheaval in the royal court.

=== Sri Lanka under British Control (1815–1948) ===
Between 1815 and 1948, Sri Lanka was a British Crown colony. Although the British monarch was the head of state, in practice his or her functions were exercised in the colony by the colonial Governor, who acted on instructions from the British government in London.

=== Monarch of Ceylon (1948–1972) ===
From 1948 to 1972, under the Ceylon Independence Act 1947 (11 & 12 Geo. 6. c. 7), the monarch the served as the Head of state of Sri Lanka (then known as Ceylon), and was represented in the country by a governor-general. Ceylon became a republic under the Constitution of 1972, and the monarch was replaced by a ceremonial president. Since 1978, under the current constitution, the president has executive powers, serving as both the head of state and head of government.

== Republican Sri Lanka (since 1972) ==
Under the 1972 Constitution of the Republic of Sri Lanka, the president of Sri Lanka replaced the monarch as the ceremonial head of state. The president was elected by the National Assembly for a six-year term. In the event of a vacancy, the prime minister would serve as acting president.

In the 1978 Constitution, the presidency was made an executive post, otherwise all other the rules were the same as in the 1972 constitution.

During the constitutional crisis of 2018, the Sri Lankan president attempted to dismiss and replace the prime minister unilaterally, but his action was resisted by parliament and the judiciary.
