= Royal Titles Act 1953 (Ceylon) =

Parliament of Ceylon
- Long title: An Act to provide for the Alteration of the Royal Style and Titles.
- Territorial extent: Ceylon
- Passed by: Parliament of Ceylon
- Passed: 26 March 1953
- Royal assent: 7 April 1953
- Commenced: 28 May 1953
- Repealed: 22 May 1972
- Bill citation: No. 22 of 1953

Repealed by
- Sri Lankan Constitution of 1972
- Status: Repealed

The Royal Titles Act 1953 was an act of the Parliament of Ceylon which altered the monarch's style and titles in Ceylon.

The Queen assumed the new style and titles by a proclamation on 28 May 1953.

== Background ==
At the 1952 Commonwealth Prime Ministers' Economic Conference, Commonwealth prime ministers, after months of discussion on whether the newly ascended Queen Elizabeth II should have a uniform Royal Styles and Titles throughout the Commonwealth or whether realms should adopt their own styles and titles, it was agreed that each member of the Commonwealth "should use for its own purposes a form of the Royal Style and Titles which suits its own particular circumstances but retains a substantial element which is common to all". It was decided that the monarch's title in all her realms have, as their common element the description of the Sovereign as "Queen of Her Realms and Territories and Head of the Commonwealth". The prime ministers agreed to pass appropriate legislation in their respective parliaments.

== Legislation ==
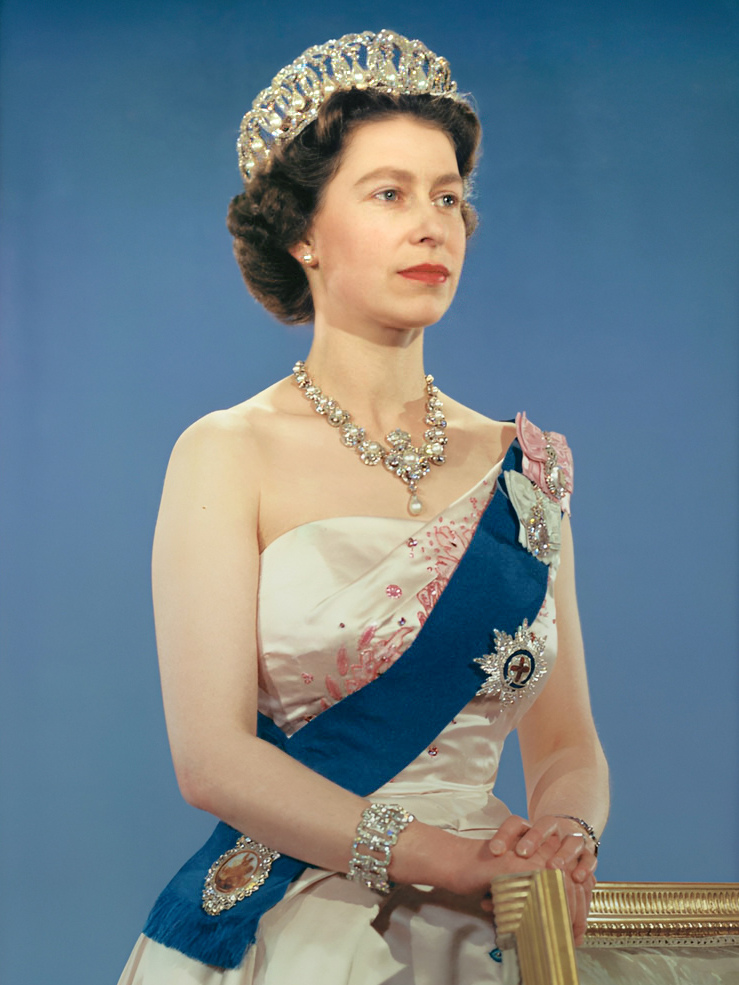
Elizabeth II, Queen of Ceylon

The bill to alter the monarch's style and titles was passed by the Parliament of Ceylon on 26 March 1953, and received royal assent on 7 April 1953. The Act gave Parliament's assent to the adoption of separate style and titles by the monarch in relation to Ceylon. The royal style and titles proposed in the bill were: Elizabeth the Second, Queen of Ceylon and of Her other Realms and Territories, Head of the Commonwealth.

Royal Titles Act

An Act to provide for the Alteration of the Royal Style and Titles.
No. 22 of 1953

[April 7, 1953]

1. This Act may be cited as the Royal Titles Act

2. The assent of the Parliament of Ceylon is hereby given to the adoption by Her Majesty for use in relation to Ceylon of the style and titles set out in the Schedule to this Act, in lieu of the style and titles at present appertaining to the Crown, and to the issue by Her for that purpose, at the request of the Prime Minister of Ceylon, of Her Royal Proclamation under the Great Seal.

SCHEDULE

(Style and titles referred to)

"Elizabeth the Second, Queen of Ceylon and of Her other Realms and Territories, Head of the Commonwealth."

== Commencement ==
From my place in our Parliament not long ago, before me a Mace of crystal and precious metal, the gift of that Parliament whose traditions we endeavour to follow, I, of free choice and as representative of my people, cast my vote for a Bill by authority of which Your Majesty has graciously assumed the Title of Queen of Ceylon. It is in that Title then that I greet Your Majesty, Elizabeth the Second, Queen of Ceylon, and wish success, prosperity and peace for yourself and the Commonwealth.

— Sir John Kotelawala, Minister of Transport and Works,
27 May 1953

The Queen assumed the new style and titles by a proclamation, sealed with the Great Seal, on 28 May 1953.

== Repeal ==
The Royal Titles Act was repealed by the Sri Lankan Constitution of 1972, which abolished the Ceylonese monarchy on 22 May 1972.

== See also ==
- Dominion of Ceylon
- Governor-General of Ceylon
- 1953 Coronation Honours (Ceylon)
- Royal Style and Titles Act
