= Miliani Sansoni =

Chief Justice of Ceylon from 1964 to 1966

32nd Chief Justice of Ceylon
- In office 1964–1966
- Appointed by: William Gopallawa
- Preceded by: Hema Henry Basnayake
- Succeeded by: Hugh Norman Gregory Fernando

Personal details
- Born: 1904
- Died: 1979 (aged 74–75)
- Spouse: Phyllis Ondaartje (1930 – 1979?)
- Children: 2 (Tania, Miliani Philip)
- Education: Royal College Colombo

Deshamanya Miliani Edward Claude Sansoni (18 November 1904 – 1979) was a Ceylonese judge, who served as the 32nd Chief Justice of Ceylon.

== Early life and education ==
He was born on 18 November 1904 to Claude Aldons Sansoni, JP, a Proctor and Hilda Gratiaen, daughter of Edward Stork Gratiaen, Colonial Surgeon, Ceylon Medical Department and Sophia Jane Vander Smagt. He had a brother, Hildon Claude Sansoni, and a sister, Sylvia Carmen, who married Clinton Bryan Fernando. His brother, Hildon, was a proctor and a lieutenant in the Ceylon Royal Navy Reserve, who served as an extra aide-de-camp to the governor general of Ceylon. Hildon married the artist Barbara Sansoni, who founded the Barefoot textile design company. She gave birth to two sons; Dominic and Simon.

Sansoni was educated at Royal College Colombo, where he was the editor of the Royal College Magazine. He graduated from the University of London with a BA degree and was called to the bar as a barrister from the Gray's Inn. On his return to Ceylon, he was enrolled as an advocate.

== Judicial career ==
After practicing the unofficial bar, he was appointed Acting Magistrate, Dandagamuwa in December 1937 and thereafter Acting Magistrate, Kandy. He joined the Ceylon Judicial Service on 1 July 1939, on probation in the Class II, Grade I as Magistrate, Kandy and was confirmed in service on 1 July 1940. Promoted to Class II, Grade III on 1 April 1942, he was appointed District Judge, Tangalle. He went on to serve as District Judge, Batticaloa (28 August 1944); Acting District Judge, Badulla (16 April 1945); Acting District Judge, Panadura (19 August 1946); District Judge, Kegalle (15 January 1947); Additional District Judge, Colombo (1 April 1949). He was promoted to Class I, Grade II on 1 January 1946, Supernumerary Officer (Class I, Grade II) on 1 March 1948 and Officer Class I, Grade I in March 1949 in the Ceylon Judicial Service. Between March 1949 and September 1953, he served as Additional District Judge, Colombo; Acting District Judge, Colombo and District Judge, Colombo. On 15 September 1953 he was appointed Commissioner of Assize and promoted to officer Special Class in the Ceylon Judaical Service on 9 November 1953. He was thereafter appointed to the Supreme Court of Ceylon as a Puisne Justice.

He was appointed in 1964 as Chief Justice of Ceylon succeeding Hema Henry Basnayake and served as Chief Justice until 1966. He was succeeded by Hugh Norman Gregory Fernando. He chaired the Sansoni Commission that investigated the riots of 1977.

== Honors ==
He was conferred the national honour of the title of Deshamanya in the first ever Independence Day National Honours list in 1986.

== Family ==
He married Phyllis Frances Ondaartje daughter of Aelian Owen Morgan Ondaartje, JP, UM, a Proctor and Elsie Thompson Staiunton at the St. Michael's and All Angels' Church, Colombo on 4 October 1930. They had a daughter, Tania Sansoni and son, Miliani Philip Sansoni.

Legal offices
Preceded by Hema Henry Basnayake	Chief Justice of Ceylon; 1964–1966	Succeeded by Hugh Norman Gregory Fernando
