= King of Ceylon =

King of Ceylon is a title that may refer to:

- the head of state of Ceylon from 1948 to 1952
  - George VI, the only person to hold this position between 1948 and 1952; Elizabeth II was Queen of Ceylon from 1952 to 1972; see Monarchy of Ceylon (1948–1972)
- any king of Sri Lanka, see List of Sri Lankan monarchs
