= Queen of Ceylon (disambiguation) =

Queen of Ceylon was the title of Elizabeth II, the head of state of Ceylon from 1952 to 1972.

It may also refer to any queen of Sri Lanka; see List of Sri Lankan monarchs.
