= Joseph Cooray =

Joseph Anthony Leopold Cooray (known as J. A. L. Cooray) was a jurist in Constitutional Law and Human Rights in Sri Lanka. Cooray was a member of the Constitutional Drafting Committees of both the Sri Lankan Constitution of 1972 and the 1978 Constitution of Sri Lanka. Cooray was also a Co-Secretary of the Ceylon National Congress and an influential member of "the Young Turks" of Sri Lanka. Cooray served as a Judge of the Constitutional Court of Sri Lanka. He also served as the Vice-Chairman of the UN Human Rights Committee from 1987 to 1990. Cooray was influential in including a chapter on Fundamental Human Rights (a new trend in Constitution-making at the time) in the Sri Lankan Constitution of 1972. Cooray is the author of Constitutional and Administrative Law of Sri Lanka

== Education ==
Cooray received his school education at St. Joseph's College, Colombo. He read for the law at Gray's Inn and the University of London, after which he was called to the bar as a Barrister-at-law. Cooray was conferred an LLD from the University of London.
