= Hugh Norman Gregory Fernando =

Chief Justice of Sri Lanka from 1966 to 1973

33rd Chief Justice of Ceylon
- In office 1966–1973
- Appointed by: William Gopallawa
- Preceded by: Miliani Sansoni
- Succeeded by: Gardiye Punchihewage Amaraseela Silva

Personal details
- Born: 17 November 1910
- Died: 24 March 1976 (aged 65)

Hugh Norman Gregory Fernando, OBE (17 November 1910 – 24 March 1976) was Sri Lanka lawyer and judge. He was the 33rd Chief Justice of Ceylon and had served as Legal Draftsman of Ceylon.

== Early life and education ==
Born to V. M. Fernando, a Puisne Justice of the Supreme Court of Ceylon, Fernando was educated at St. Joseph's College, Colombo and at the University of Oxford, where he gained a BA degree and was called to the bar as a barrister from the Gray's Inn. On his return to Ceylon, he was enrolled as an advocate.

== Legal career ==
Having acted as a Crown Counsel between December 1935 to September 1936, he was appointed Assistant Legal Draftsman on 1 October 1936. On secondment he served as Secretary of the Mortgage Law Commission and the Committee Investigating Representations from Departments where strikes occurred. He was promoted to Senior Assistant Legal Draftsman on 20 April 1945. In February 1948, he was appointed a member of the Company Law Commission. Having served as Acting Legal Draftsman from October 1948 to January 1949, he was appointed Legal Draftsman on 7 January 1949. In August 1953, he served as Acting Solicitor General. Thereafter he was appointment as Puisne Justice of the Supreme Court of Ceylon in 1955. He was appointed in 1966 succeeding Miliani Sansoni and was Chief Justice until 1973. He was succeeded by Gardiye Punchihewage Amaraseela Silva.

== Honors ==
He was appointed an Officer in the Order of the British Empire in the 1953 Coronation Honours.

== Family ==
His son, Mark Fernando also served as Judge of the Supreme Court of Sri Lanka.

Legal offices
Preceded by Miliani Sansoni	Chief Justice of Ceylon; 1966–1973	Succeeded by Gardiye Punchihewage Amaraseela Silva
