= Gardiye Punchihewage Amaraseela Silva =

Chief Justice of Sri Lanka from 1973 to 1974

34th Chief Justice of Sri Lanka
- In office 1973–1974
- Appointed by: William Gopallawa
- Preceded by: Hugh Norman Gregory Fernando
- Succeeded by: Victor Tennekoon

Gardiye Punchihewage Amaraseela Silva was the 34th Chief Justice of Sri Lanka. He was appointed in 1973 succeeding Hugh Norman Gregory Fernando and was Chief Justice until 1974. He was succeeded by Victor Tennekoon.

Legal offices
| Preceded by Hugh Norman Gregory Fernando | Chief Justice of Sri Lanka; 1973-1974 | Succeeded by Victor Tennekoon |
