= Royal Titles Act 1953 =

Royal Titles Act 1953 may refer to:

- Royal Titles Act 1953 (Ceylon)
- Royal Titles Act 1953 (United Kingdom)
