= 1953 Coronation Honours (Ceylon) =

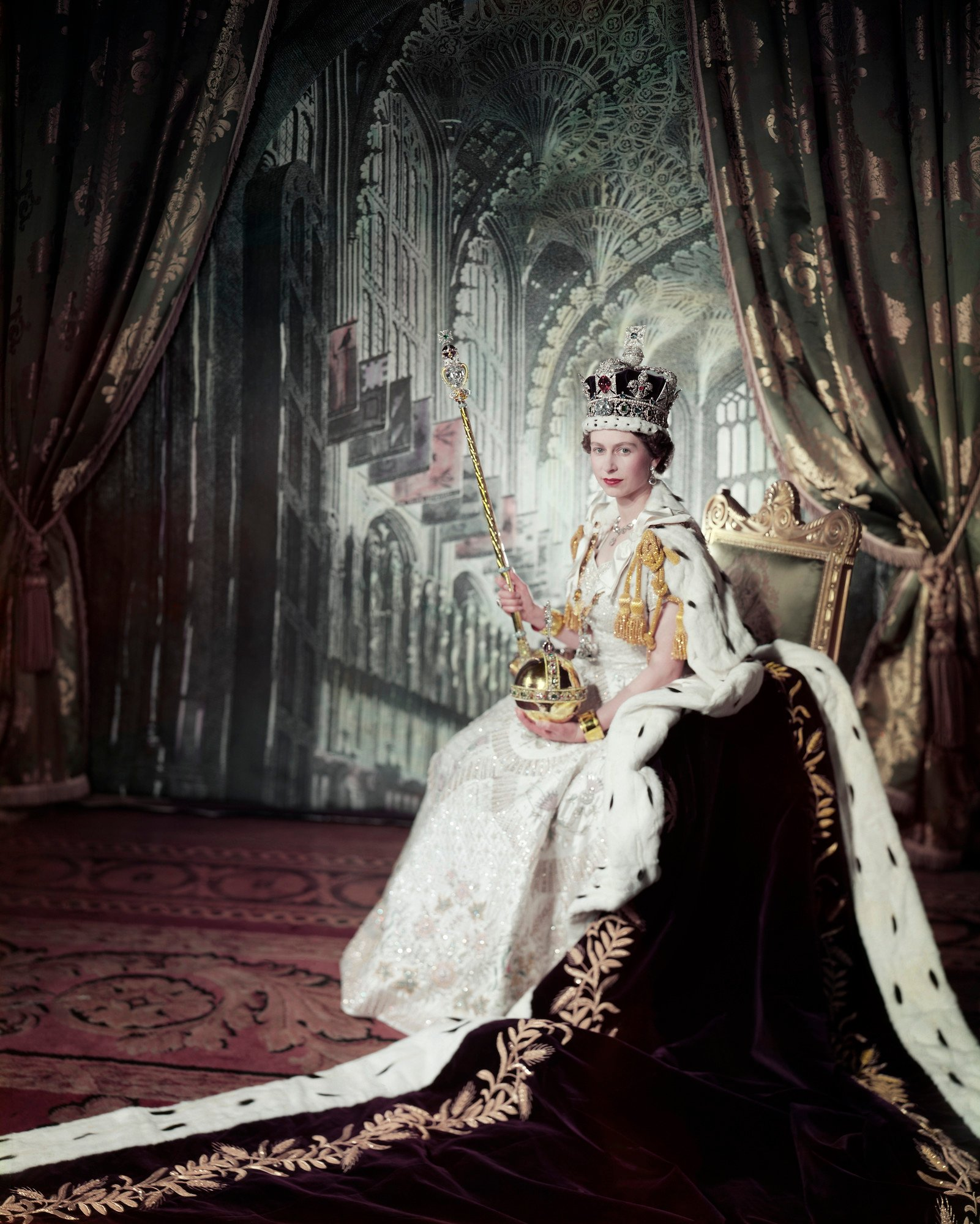
Coronation portrait by Cecil Beaton, 1953

The 1953 Coronation Honours in Ceylon, celebrating the coronation of Elizabeth II, Queen of Ceylon, were appointments made by the Queen on the advice of the Ceylon government to various orders and honours to reward and highlight good works by Ceylonese. The honours were announced on 1 June 1953.

The recipients of honours are displayed here as they were styled before their new honour.

== Knight Bachelor ==
- The Honourable Mr. Nicholas Attygalle, F.R.C.S., L.R.C.P., President Of The Senate. For Services To Medicine.
- Senapathige Theobald Philip Rodrigo, Esq., O.B.E., Senator. For Social Services In Colombo North.

== Order of the British Empire ==
=== Knight Commander (KBE) ===
Civil division

- Sir Ukwatte Acharige Jayasundera, C.B.E., Q.C., Senator And Advocate.

=== Commander (CBE) ===
Civil division

- Philip James Hudson, Esq., O.B.E., M.C., Government Agent, Northern Province, Jaffna.
- Justin Kotalawela, Esq., Senator. For Services To Commerce.
- Tellipalai Chinnappah Rajaratnam, Esq., O.B.E., J.P., Proctor. For Services To The Co-Operative Movement.

=== Officer (OBE) ===
Civil Division

- Thomas Amarasuriya, Esq. For Services To The Plantation Industries.
- Ralph St. Louis Pieris Deraniyagala, Esq., M.B.E., Clerk Of The House Of Representatives.
- Hugh Norman Gregory Fernando, Esq., Legal Draftsman.
- Kathiravale Kanagasundram, Esq., chairman, Gal Oya Development Board.
- Ahamado Casim Mohammado, Esq., M.B.E., J.P., Proctor And Notary.
- Wilfred Henry Moore, Esq., Excise Commissioner.
- Devar Surya Sena. For Services To Music.
- Eric Watson Whitelaw, Esq. For Services To The Rubber Industry.

=== Member (MBE) ===
Civil Division

- Stanley Harold Abeyesekere, Esq., Proctor. For Public Services In Uva Province.
- Franklin Alexander Clarence De Silva, Esq., School Works Engineer, Department Of Education.
- Santiago Wilson Osmund De Silva, Esq., Deputy Inspector-General Of Police.
- Thimbripolage Alfred Fernando, Esq. For Charitable Services.
- Samuel Peter Foenander, Esq., Lately Sports Journalist.
- Lionel Lillinton Fonseka, Esq., Proctor. For Services To Tennis.
- William Gopallawa, Esq., Municipal Commissioner, Colombo Municipal Council.
- Nellie, Mrs. Gunasekera. For Social Services.
- Thomas David Jayasuriya, Esq., deputy director, Department Of Education.
- Hilda Westbrook, Mrs. Kularatne, Principal, Girls' Senior School, Bandarawela.
- Davison Arthur Peiris, Esq., Chief Construction Engineer, Ceylon University Scheme, Public Works Department.
- Lieutenant Colonel Sabdharatnajyoti Saravanamuttu. For Services To Cricket.
- Victor Joseph Thompson, Esq., Colonel, Salvation Army.
- Martin Wickramasinghe, Esq., Journalist and Author.
- Victor Lloyd Wirasinha, Esq., Commissioner for the Registration Of Indian And Pakistani Residents, And Commissioner of Parliamentary Elections.

Military division

- Warrant Officer Class II Manual Arumanayagam, Ceylon Light Infantry
- Major Fulham Sebastian Victor Wright, Ceylon Engineers

== Companion of the Imperial Service Order (ISO) ==
Ceylon Civil Service

- Kandayah Chellappah Selvadurai, Esq., Deputy Commissioner Of Motor Traffic and Registrar Of Motor Vehicles.
- Warusahennedige Abraham Soysa Wjjeratne, Esq., Assistant To The Government Agent, Western Province.
