= Sri Lankan Constitution of 1972 =

Fundamental law of Sri Lanka from 1972 to 1978

Constitution of the Republic of Sri Lanka
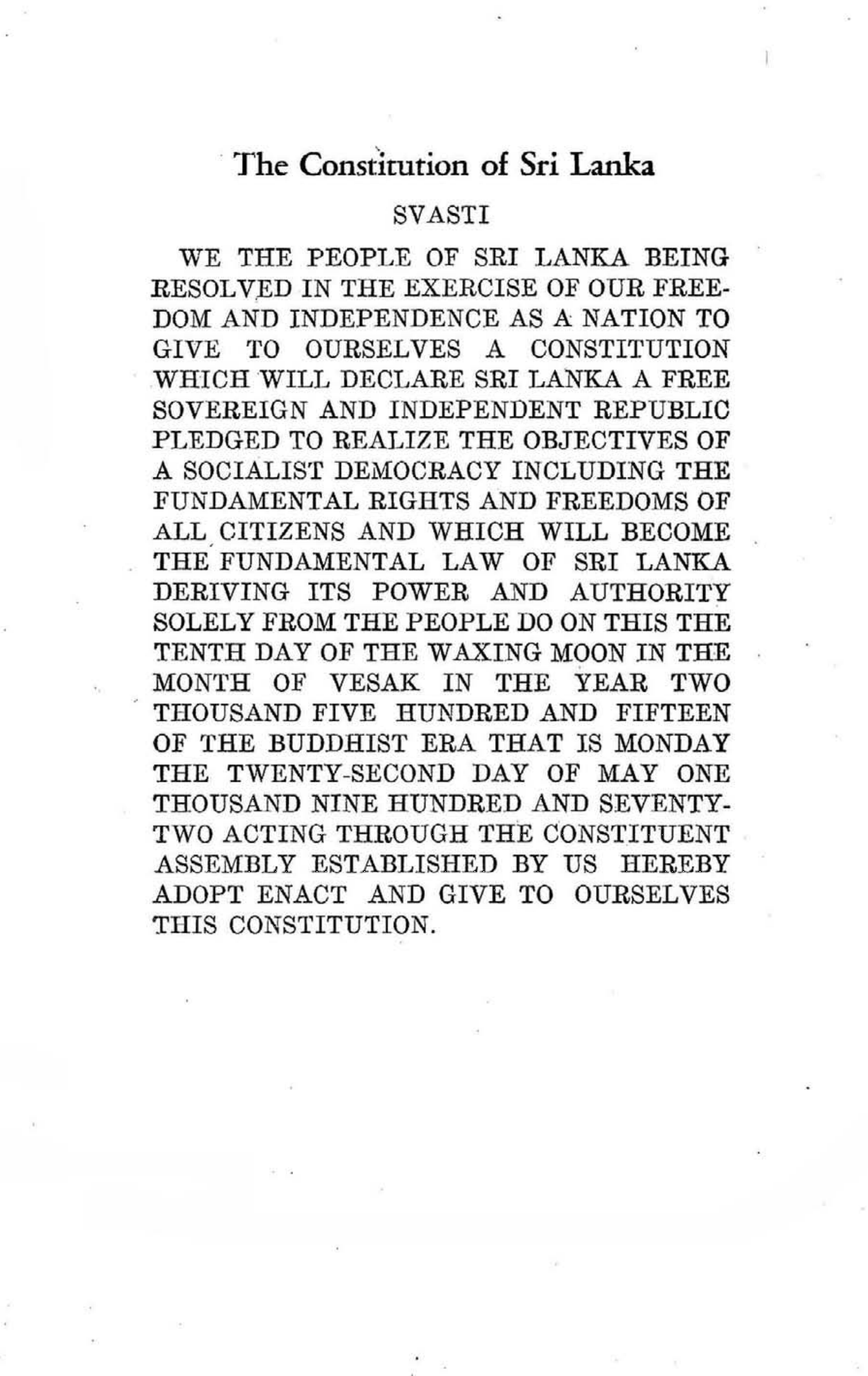
- Page one of the 1972 Constitution

Overview
- Jurisdiction: Sri Lanka
- Ratified: 22 May 1972
- Author: 7th Parliament of Sri Lanka
- Supersedes: Soulbury Constitution of 1947

The Sri Lankan Constitution of 1972 was a constitution of Sri Lanka, replaced by the 1978 constitution currently in force. It was Sri Lanka's first republican constitution, and its second since independence in 1948. The constitution changed the country's name from Ceylon to Sri Lanka, and established it as an independent republic. The country was officially designated as the "Republic of Sri Lanka," leading to the constitution being known as the 1972 Republican Constitution. The constitution was promulgated on 22 May 1972.

== History ==
The arrival of the Portuguese in 1505 and their interest in the island altered the political landscape of the Sri Lankan state: the island had been ruled by seven native kingdoms in succession (at times several concurrently), with the Kingdom of Kotte first coming under Portuguese occupation. The Dutch ended Portuguese influence, and continued colonial occupation on the island from 1640 until 1796, when the British in turn replaced them. Unlike the Portuguese and Dutch, the British were eventually able to occupy the entirety of the island as a Crown colony, creating British Ceylon in 1815.

With British influence came ideas of democratic principles and governance, including the concept of a constitution- indeed, the Sri Lankan independence movement was notable for demanding self-rule and reform on a constitutional basis rather than through popular movements such as that in neighbouring India. The Dominion of Ceylon gained independence on 4 February 1948, adopting the Soulbury Constitution as its constitution. Executive power was nominally vested in the Sovereign of Ceylon, while legislative powers were vested with a semi-independent parliament. Several perceived weaknesses of the 1947 Soulbury Constitution, however, eventually led to calls for a replacement, particularly from nationalists and the Left, the Lanka Sama Samaja Party's Colvin R. de Silva being a central figure in the movement.

“We seek your mandate to permit the members of Parliament you elect to function simultaneously as a Constituent Assembly to draft, adopt and operate a new Constitution. This Constitution will declare Ceylon to be a free, sovereign and independent Republic pledged to realise the objectives of a socialist democracy; and it will also secure fundamental rights and freedoms to all citizens.”

— Manifesto of the United Front, 1970,

The United Front, led by Sirimavo Bandaranaike's Sri Lanka Freedom Party, won the 1970 general election with a two-thirds majority. As Prime Minister, Bandaranaike convened a number of committees to draft a new constitution, including a drafting committee chaired by the Minister for Constitutional Affairs, Colvin R. de Silva.

On 19 July 1970, around 1,500 people, including parliamentarians and academics, gathered at the Navarangahala of Royal College, Colombo, where a Constitution Drafting Board chaired by Stanley Thilakaratne was appointed.

The resulting document was tabled in parliament, voted on and adopted on 22 May 1972 by a vote of 119 to 16 against.

Article 1 of this constitution declared Sri Lanka to be a free, sovereign and independent republic, while Article 2 declared it to be a unitary state.

== Impact and criticism ==
The 1972 constitution paved the way for Sri Lanka to become a republic, cutting the final ties with its colonial past and British influence, and imparted a firm leftist nature to the state, allowing for the heavily socialist economic policies of the Bandaranaike government.

The main opposition party at the time, the United National Party (UNP), voted against the constitution's adoption on the following grounds:

1. Making a particular ideology a constitutional principle, and thereby depriving the people of the right to determine economic policies from time to time at periodic elections,
2. Including a truncated list of fundamental rights and almost nullifying their effect by making them subject to excessive restrictions and numerous principles of so-called state policy,
3. Failing to provide a simple and suitable remedy for the violation of a fundamental right,
4. Preserving laws hitherto in force even if they are inconsistent with fundamental rights,
5. Departing from the practice of all existing republics of directly or indirectly electing the Head of State, and providing instead for nomination by a political migratory figure,
6. Giving the members of the first National State Assembly a term of seven years,
7. Introducing control by the Cabinet of Ministers over the subordinate judiciary,
8. Depriving the judiciary of the power to determine the constitutional propriety of laws, and
9. Abandoning the principle of the neutrality of the public service.

A key point of criticism levelled at the constitution has centred around the non-inclusive and non-representative nature of its drafting process. The committees tasked with the drafting were overwhelmingly populated with members of the UF: the Steering and Subjects Committee, responsible for drafting resolutions on basic principles to base the new constitution on, consisted of 17 MPs, 12 of whom were cabinet members of the UF government, one member from the UF's minority All Ceylon Tamil Congress partner, one independent representative (also from the ruling coalition), and three opposition MPs (J. R. Jayewardene and Dudley Senanayake from the UNP, and S. J. V. Chelvanayakam from the Federal Party). Moreover, the drafts of the resolutions of basic constitutional principles were drawn up via a process that left the Steering and Subjects Committee with no true powers of its own:

1. Drafts of resolutions were prepared by a drafting committee under the purview of Colvin R. de Silva's Ministry of Constitutional Affairs,
2. Draft resolutions were then submitted for vetting and approval by a group of senior SLFP MPs, and the leadership of the LSSP and CP- the two junior partners in the UF coalition,
3. Vetted resolutions were submitted for formal cabinet approval through a 12-member ministerial sub-committee, and
4. Finally tabled at meetings of the Steering and Subjects Committee.

The Federal Party exited the Constituent Assembly in June 1971, citing these and other reasons. The UNP also made several complaints about the lack of consideration given by the committees to recommendations made by the opposition, and warned from the outset that they would not vote in favour of the final product. In addition, a considerable portion of public feedback was said to have been ignored on the grounds that such recommendations ran contrary to basic principles.

Another major point of criticism has been the lack of considerations or safeguards made for the country's minority communities and their basic rights, including religion and language- the new constitution having largely done away with the few such provisions present in the previous one.

Overall, the 1972 constitution has been seen as a key turning point for governance in the country, leading to less impartiality throughout the Executive-, Legislative and Judicial systems. Several characteristics of this constitution may be noticed in the newer constitution.

== See also ==
- Constitution of Sri Lanka

Comparable acts in ex-Dominions' constitutional law

- Australia Acts 1986
- Canada Act 1982
- Constitution of India
- Constitution of Ireland
- New Zealand Constitution Act 1986
- Pakistan Constitution of 1956
- Status of the Union Act, 1934 and South African Constitution of 1961
