= Monarchy of Ceylon (1948–1972) =

- Armorial Ensign of Ceylon

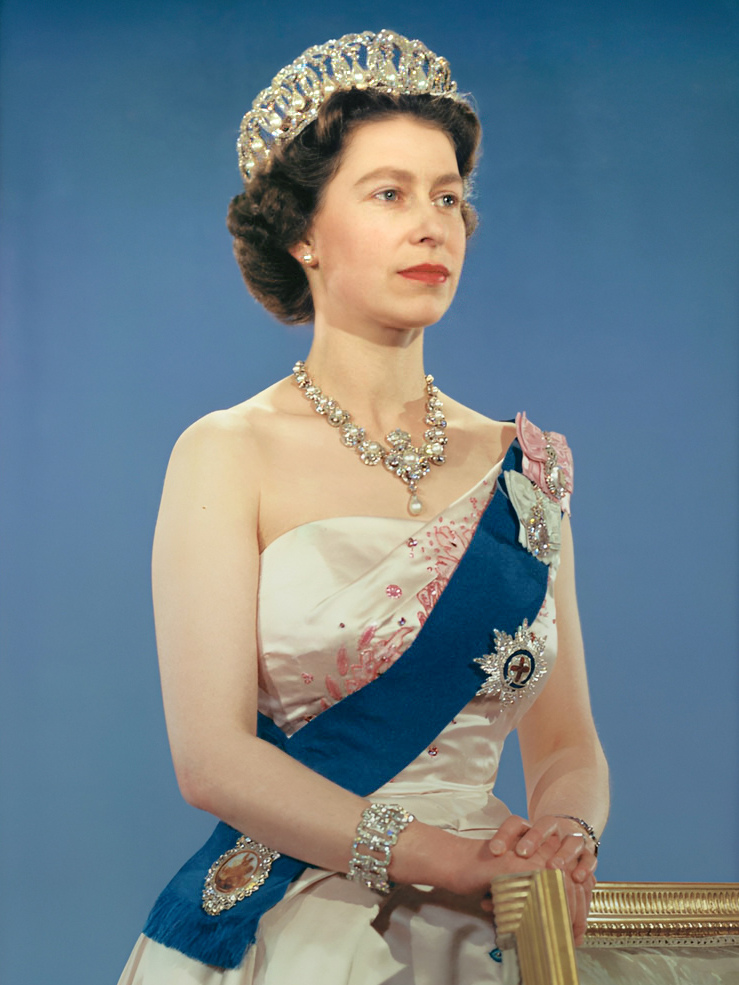
- Last to reign Elizabeth II; 6 February 1952 – 22 May 1972

Details
- Style: His Majesty (1948–1952); Her Majesty (1952–1972)
- First monarch: George VI
- Last monarch: Elizabeth II
- Formation: 4 February 1948
- Abolition: 22 May 1972

From 1948 to 1972, the Dominion of Ceylon functioned as an independent constitutional monarchy in which a hereditary monarch was the sovereign and head of state of the country. Ceylon shared the sovereign with the other Commonwealth realms, with the country's monarchy being separate and legally distinct. The monarch's constitutional and ceremonial duties were mostly delegated to their representative, the governor-general of Ceylon.

The Ceylon Independence Act 1947 transformed the British Crown Colony of Ceylon into an independent sovereign state known as the Dominion of Ceylon. Upon independence in 1948, King George VI became the monarch of Ceylon and reigned until his death in 1952; he was succeeded by his elder daughter Queen Elizabeth II. In 1953, Elizabeth II was granted the official title of Queen of Ceylon by the country's parliament and, in this capacity, she visited the island nation in April 1954. The Crown primarily functioned as a guarantor of continuous and stable governance and a nonpartisan safeguard against the abuse of power.

On 22 May 1972, Ceylon changed its name to Sri Lanka and became a republic within the Commonwealth, thereby ending the island's 2,500-year-old monarchical system.

== History ==
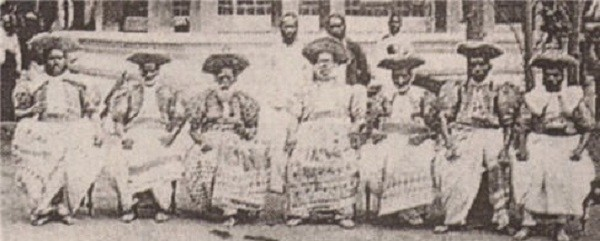
The signatories to the Kandyan Convention which ceded the Kingdom of Kandy to the British Empire in 1815

The British East India Company's conquest of Ceylon occurred during the wars of the French Revolution (1792–1801). In 1802, Ceylon was made a crown colony, and, by the Treaty of Amiens with France, British possession of maritime Ceylon was confirmed. With the help of local Kandyan chiefs whose relations with King Vikrama Rajasinha had been deteriorating, the British succeeded in taking over the kingdom in 1815. With the signing of the Kandyan Convention, the British guaranteed Kandyans their privileges and rights, as well as the preservation of customary laws, institutions, and religion. In 1833, steps were taken to adopt a unitary administrative and judicial system for the whole island. The reforms reduced the autocratic powers of the governor and set up Executive and Legislative councils to share in the task of government.

In 1934, the crown and throne of the kings of Kandy, which were taken to Britain in 1815, were returned to Ceylon during a royal tour by Prince Henry, Duke of Gloucester. The transfer of the regalia symbolised the grant of a degree of self-government as the Donoughmore Constitution had established the State Council of Ceylon and enabled general elections with adult universal suffrage to the people of Ceylon in 1931.

In 1944, the British government appointed a commission under the chairmanship of Lord Soulbury to visit Ceylon for purposes of examining and discussing proposals for constitutional reform. The commission issued its report the next year. In May 1946, a draft constitution was presented to the court at Buckingham Palace. The Ceylon Independence Order in Council followed in December 1947. The new Constitution went into effect on 4 February of the following year; the day was celebrated as Ceylon Independence Day which was marked with special services held by different religious organisations across the country. Ceylon's decision to remain in the Commonwealth was supported by local newspapers. One of the papers stated:

Ceylon rejoices with the rest of the Commonwealth ... As long as Ceylon chooses to remain within the family of free nations linked by allegiance to democratic ideals and as long as constitutional monarchy remains consistent with those ideals Britain's King is Ceylon's King.

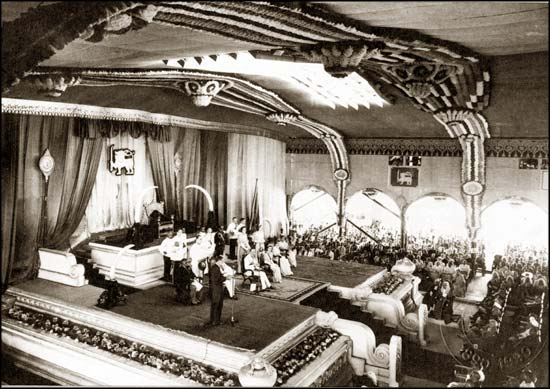
The Duke of Gloucester opening the first session of the Ceylonese Parliament on behalf of his brother George VI, King of Ceylon, 10 February 1948

On 4 February 1948, Sir Henry Monck-Mason Moore, the last colonial governor, was sworn in as the first governor-general of Ceylon at a solemn but brief ceremony at Queen's House, Colombo. Instruments of independence were officially handed over by the British to Prime Minister Don Stephen Senanayake, who had been voted in by the people at the first parliamentary election in August 1947.

Ceylon has now achieved independence as a fully responsible member of the British Commonwealth of Nations and with the attainment of Dominion Status you meet today in the enjoyment of all the rights and privileges pertaining to that status.

— Prince Henry, Duke of Gloucester, 1948

The highpoint of the celebrations was the opening of parliament at the Independence Hall by Prince Henry, Duke of Gloucester on 10 February 1948. Following the Westminster parliamentary tradition, Prime Minister D. S. Senanayake handed over the speech to the Duke who delivered it on behalf of King George VI. After delivering the Speech from the Throne, the Duke stood up, uncovered his head and read a message from the King to the people of Ceylon, in which he said:

I know that my people in Ceylon are ready to make a full and rich contribution to this association of free peoples and I am confident that you will carry your new responsibilities ably to this end. My good wishes go out to you on this great day and I pray that Ceylon will enjoy peace and prosperity in full measure. May God bless you all and guide your country through the years that lie ahead.

== Constitutional role ==
Your country's past is long and famous, but from what I have seen I am convinced that the future holds even more for Ceylon and for her people. Provided that you remain united and industrious you have nothing to fear and you may always rest assured that I, as your Queen, will watch your growing prosperity with the deepest pride and affection.

— Elizabeth II of Ceylon, 1954

The Ceylon Independence Act 1947 passed by the Parliament of the United Kingdom on 10 December 1947, marked the beginning of a new constitution. On 4 February 1948, Ceylon officially transitioned from a British Crown colony to an independent country within the British Commonwealth of Nations. Under the Ceylon Independence Act, no act of the British parliament passed after 4 February 1948 extended to Ceylon as part of the law of Ceylon, unless it was "expressly declared in that act that Ceylon has requested and consented to the enactment thereof".

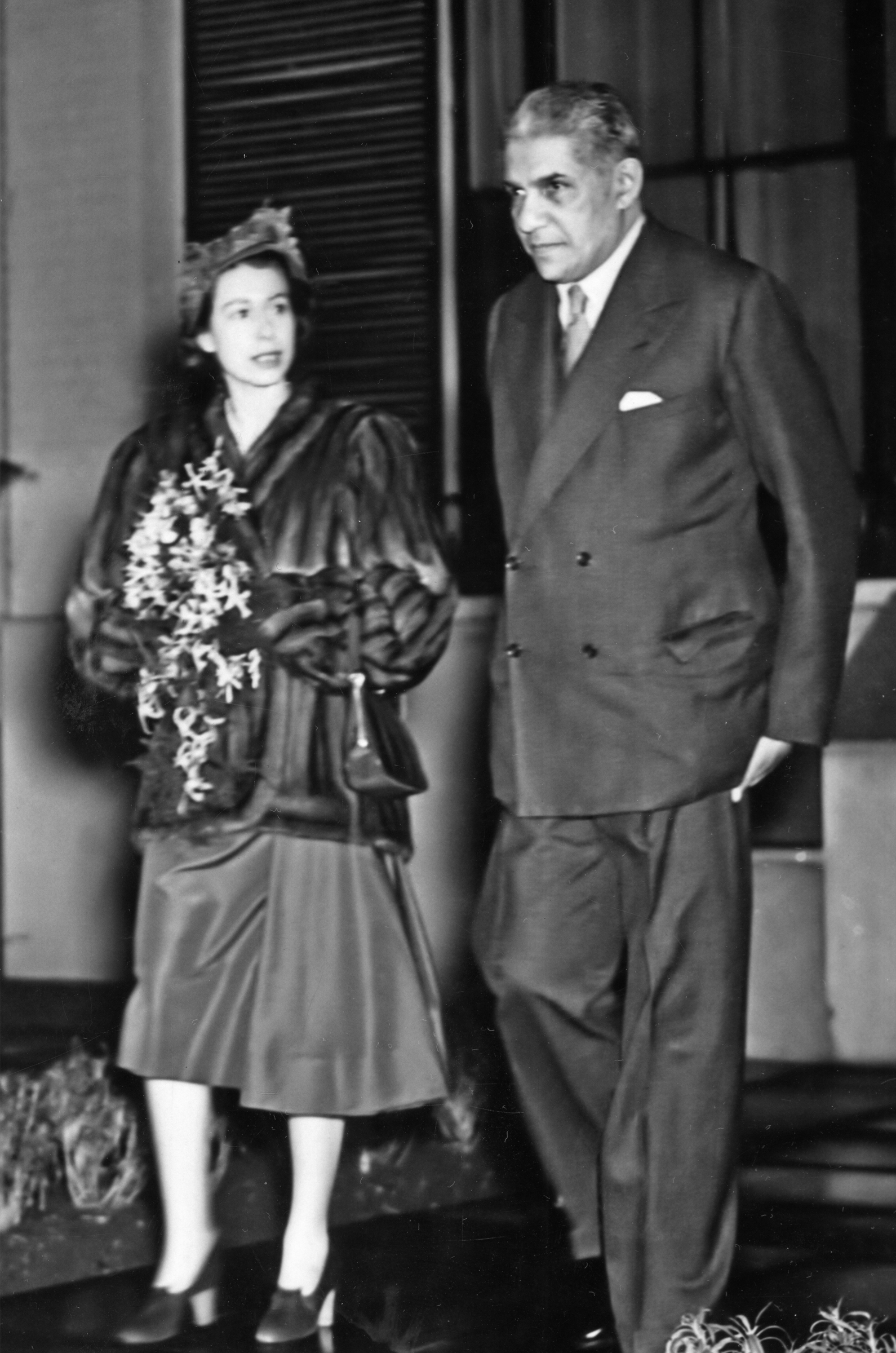
Elizabeth II, Queen of Ceylon, with Sir Edwin Wijeyeratne, Ceylonese High Commissioner to the United Kingdom, 1953

The constitution of the Dominion of Ceylon was contained in the Ceylon Independence Act 1947 and the Orders-in-Council of 1946 and 1947, known collectively as the Ceylon (Constitution and Independence) Orders-in-Council, 1947. The Constitution granted complete sovereignty to the island of Ceylon; the State Council of Ceylon had asked for dominion status in 1942, and accordingly the case for that status was made by D. S. Senanayake in August 1945 and February 1947. Under the new constitution, Ceylon was one of the dominions of the Commonwealth of Nations that shared its monarch with other Commonwealth realms. In relation to Ceylon, the monarch acted solely on the advice of Ceylonese ministers.

The monarch of Ceylon was represented in the country by a governor-general. The office of governor-general was created under the Ceylon (Office of Governor-General) Letters Patent, 1947, and he was appointed by the monarch on the recommendation of the prime minister. The governor-general's term of office was not fixed, and held office during the monarch's pleasure. This suggested that a governor-general remained in office as long as it pleased the prime minister who remained in command of a majority in the House of Representatives. As the governor-general functioned as the monarch's representative, he was therefore entitled to all the respect of a representative of the sovereign.

=== Executive ===
All executive power of the island was vested in the monarch and could be exercised by the governor-general, in accordance with the Constitution and any other law in operation in Ceylon. In Ceylon, therefore, there were two nominal executives, the monarch and the governor-general, the former taking precedence over the latter. The monarch, while visiting Ceylon, could perform the required acts or duties in person. Therefore, the governor-general was not always able to act as an independent person, as his wishes could at any time be over-ridden by an order from the monarch.

Queen Elizabeth II with her Ceylonese cabinet in Ceylon, 1954

The Constitution placed a significant amount of power in the hands of the governor-general of Ceylon, with the role being more than a nominal one. One of the main duties of the governor-general was to appoint a prime minister, who thereafter advised the governor-general on how to execute the executive powers over all aspects of government operations. Usually, the governor-general appointed as prime minister the leader of the largest single group in the House of Representatives. The majority of the governor-general's functions were exercised on the advice of the prime minister. These functions included the summoning and proroguing of parliament, appointment of members of the Public Service Commission and the Judicial Service Commission, the appointment of judges of the Supreme Court, permanent secretaries, the auditor-general, the attorney-general, the commissioner of elections, parliamentary secretaries, and the secretary and ministers of the cabinet of Ceylon.

All ministers, parliamentary secretaries, and public officers held office at the monarch's pleasure. If, on occasion, a minister or a parliamentary secretary refused to tender his or her resignation when requested to do so by the prime minister, the latter could advise the governor-general to have the official removed from office.

=== Foreign affairs ===
Under the Constitution, there were certain functions which could only be performed by the monarch and these were not in any way delegated to the governor-general. These functions among others, included the making of treaties and international agreements, the appointment of diplomatic representatives, the issuing of exequaturs to consuls and the declaration of war. In these matters, the monarch acted in his or her capacity as sovereign of Ceylon, and on the advice of the government of Ceylon.

In addition, the issuance of passports fell under the Royal Prerogative and, as such, all Ceylonese passports were issued in the monarch's name.

=== Parliament ===
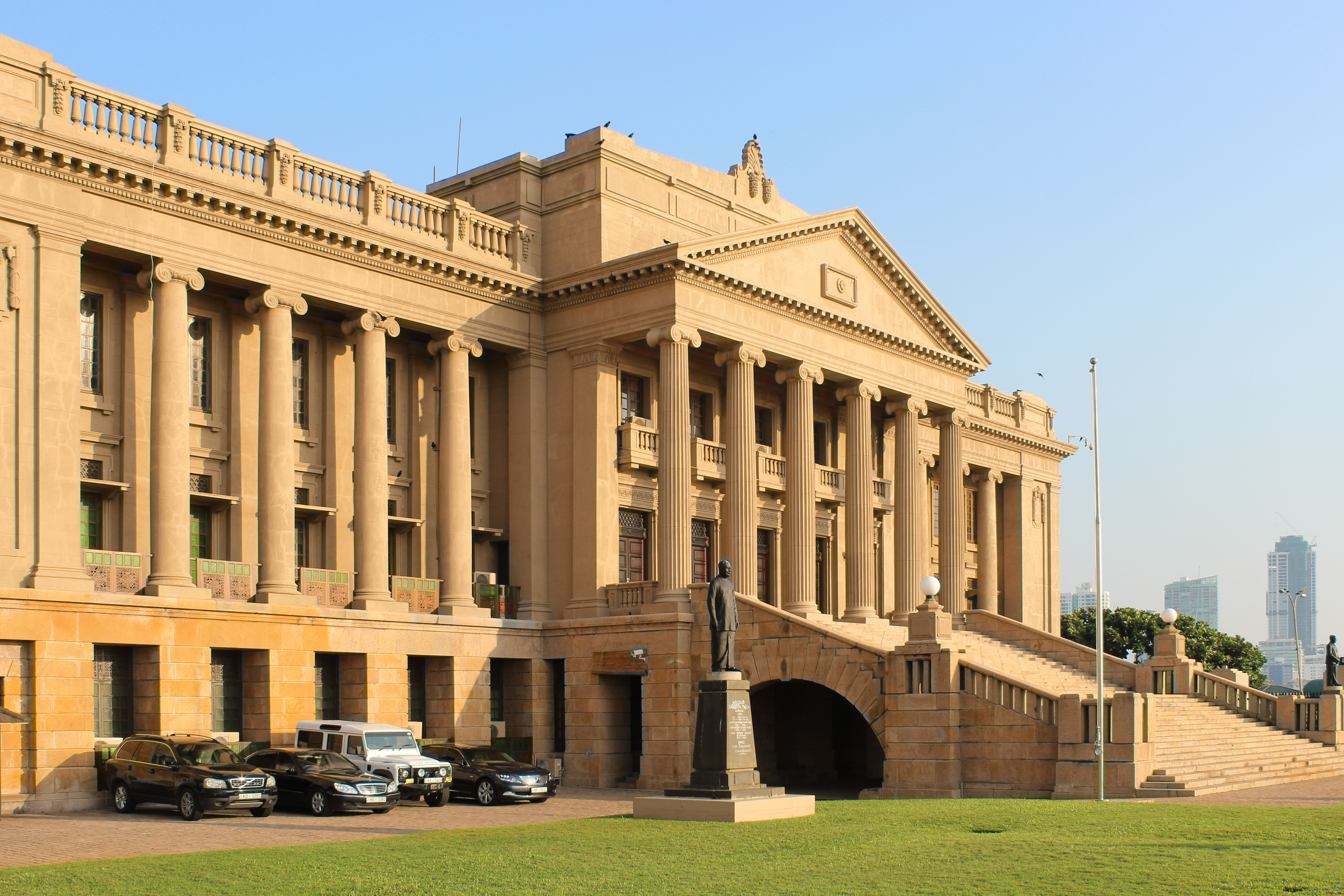
The Old Parliament Building in Colombo, the meeting place of the House of Representatives of Ceylon

The Constitution of Ceylon provided for a Parliament consisting of the monarch and two chambers: the Senate and the House of Representatives. The monarch was thus part of the Ceylonese legislature, and was usually represented by the governor-general. The Senate consisted of thirty Senators, fifteen of whom were appointed by the governor-general, and fifteen senators were elected by the House of Representatives. The House of Representatives consisted of 101 members, 95 of whom were elected, and six were appointed by the governor-general when, after a general election, he felt that any important interest in the country was represented inadequately or not at all. The Senate, however, was abolished on 2 October 1971 by the Ceylon (Constitution and Independence) Amendment Act No. 36 of 1971 introduced by the government of Sirimavo Bandaranaike.

It gives me very great pleasure to be able to open this present Session of Parliament in person. I thank you for the opportunity which has been afforded to me of meeting, in Parliament assembled, the Members of both Houses on this unique and historic occasion.

— Elizabeth II of Ceylon, Speech from the Throne, 1954

The governor-general was also responsible for summoning, proroguing, and dissolving parliament. The new parliamentary session was marked by the Ceremonial Opening of Parliament, during which the governor-general delivered the Throne Speech, on behalf of the monarch, which was drafted by the cabinet of Ceylon. The monarch could, however, send another representative to open or dissolve parliament or could come to Ceylon in person, while the governor-general continued to function in the country. Queen Elizabeth II herself opened the Parliament of Ceylon and delivered the Speech from the Throne on 12 April 1954, while the governor-general, Viscount Soulbury, was functioning in the island. King George VI deputed his brother, Prince Henry, Duke of Gloucester, to open the Ceylonese Parliament on his behalf in February 1948, though Sir Henry Monck-Mason Moore, the governor-general, was at this time in Ceylon.

External videos
- Ceylon: Ceremonial Opening of Ceylon Parliament (1970) Source: British Pathé.

All laws in Ceylon were enacted only with the granting of Royal Assent, done by the governor-general on behalf of the sovereign. Thus, bills began with the phrase: "Be it enacted by the Queen's [or King's] Most Excellent Majesty, by and with the advice and consent of the Senate and the House of Representatives of Ceylon in this present Parliament assembled, and by the authority of the same, as follows". The Royal Assent, and proclamation, were required for all acts of parliament, usually granted or withheld by the governor-general.

=== Courts ===
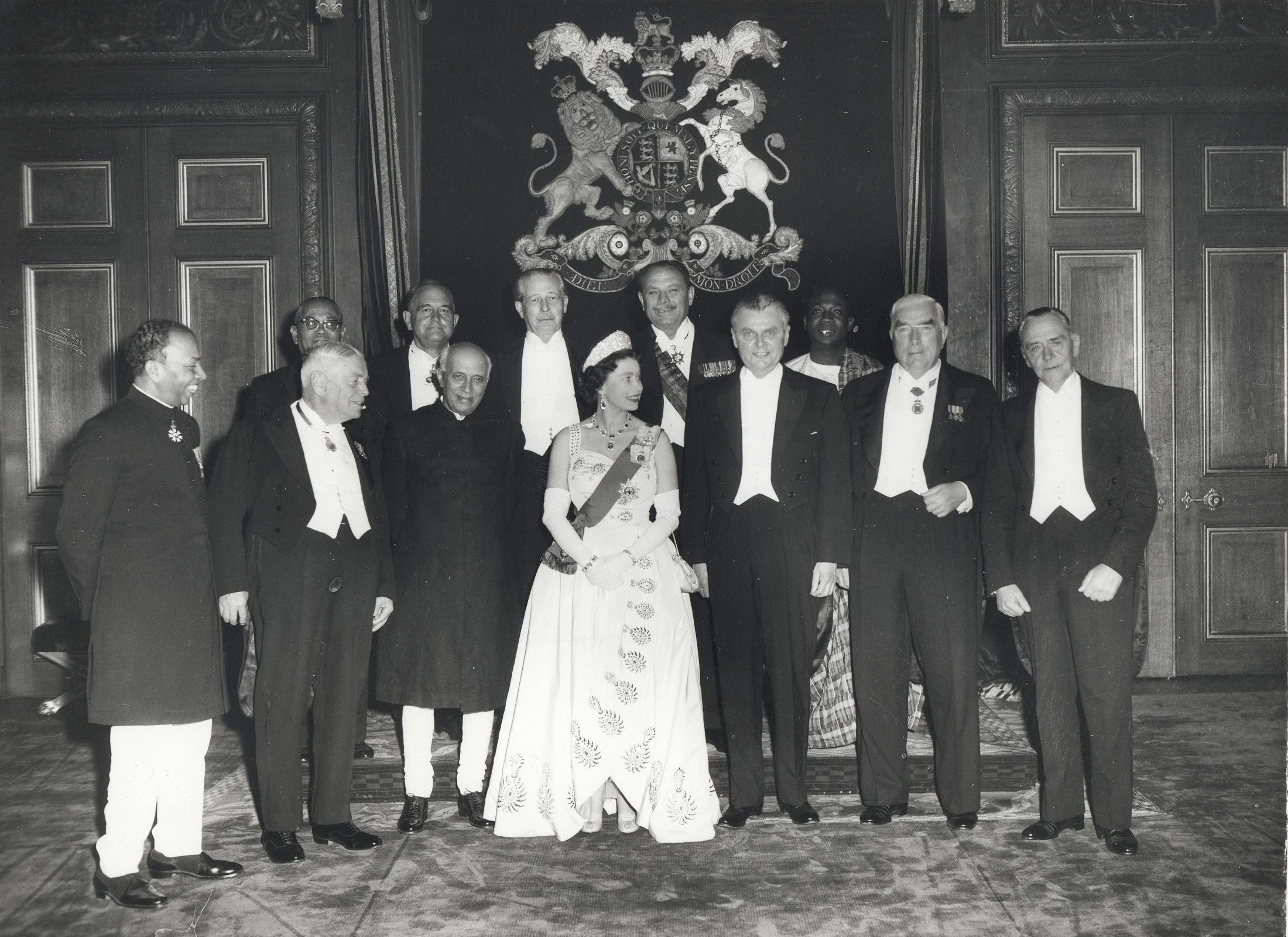
E. J. Cooray, the Ceylonese minister of justice (first from left), with the Queen and other Commonwealth leaders at Windsor Castle, 1960

The sovereign, as the "fountain of justice", was responsible for rendering justice for all of his or her subjects. In Ceylon, the Judicial Committee of the Privy Council served as the country's final court of appeal and proceedings for indictable offences were brought in the sovereign's name in the form of The Queen [or King] versus [Name]. Hence, the common law held that the sovereign "can do no wrong"; the monarch cannot be prosecuted in his or her own courts for criminal offences. However in 1971, Ceylon abolished appeals to the Privy Council through the Court of Appeal Act No. 44 of 1971.

Under the constitution, the governor-general was empowered to appoint all judges of Ceylon, including the chief justice and puisne judges of the Supreme Court and Commissioners of Assize. A Judicial Service Commission, established under the authority of the Constitution, was appointed by the governor-general and charged with the "appointment, transfer, dismissal, and disciplinary control of judicial officers". All judicial officers were required to take the oath of allegiance and the judicial oath, before taking office. Under the Promissory Oaths Ordinance, the judicial oath during the reign of Elizabeth II was:

"I, (name), do swear that I will well and truly serve Her Majesty Elizabeth the Second, Queen of Ceylon, Her Heirs and Successors, in the office of ________, and I will do all right to all manner of people after the laws and usages of Ceylon, without fear or favour, affection, or ill-will. So help me God."

Under the terms of the Constitution, moreover, no act or omission of the governor-general could be called into question before any court of law. The governor-general therefore need not, when he acted, have to think of legal or other consequences, provided he did not violate the Constitution or any law that is in operation at the time. For instance, when the name of Governor-General Sir Oliver Goonetilleke, was mentioned in connection with the failed coup d'état planned by leading officers in the Ceylon Armed Forces in January 1962, Goonetilleke expressed his willingness to be questioned by the investigating authorities. However, the Queen expressed the view that her representative while in office should not be questioned. After Goonetilleke ceased to hold office, the Palace ruled that the Sovereign was unable to intervene in a matter between the Ceylon Government and a private citizen, but that she hoped that any steps that might be taken would not in any way "bring dishonour on the high office".

In April 1971, the leftist Sinhalese Janatha Vimukthi Peramuna launched an insurrection against the Bandaranaike government. After the insurgents were defeated by the security forces, 41 alleged leaders of the revolt were charged with conspiracy to wage war against the Queen and conspiracy "to overawe by means of criminal force the Government of Ceylon." 14 of the accused were also charged with waging war against the Queen, and the other 27 with abetting the waging of war against the Queen.

Though not laid down under the Constitution, but nevertheless entrusted to the governor-general under the Ceylon (Office of Governor-General) Letters Patent, 1947, was the grant of pardons in the name and on behalf of the monarch. The governor-general could exercise this power only on the advice of the minister of justice.

== Royal style and titles ==
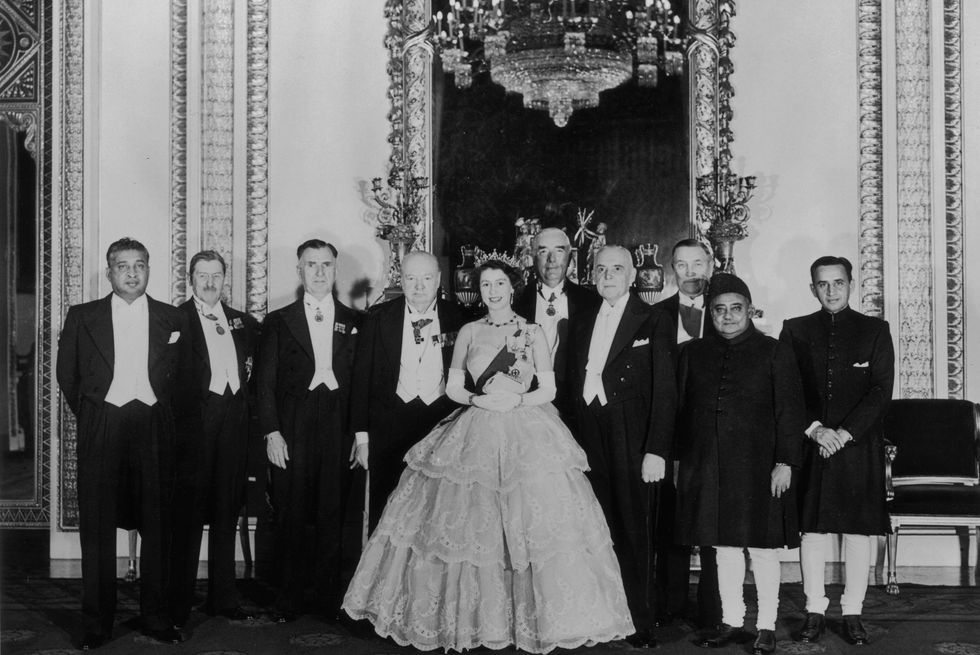
Queen Elizabeth II with Commonwealth prime ministers during their conference in December 1952 (Ceylonese Prime Minister Dudley Senanayake is first from the left)

Until the early part of the 20th century, the monarch's style and titles throughout the British Empire was determined exclusively by the Parliament of the United Kingdom. The preamble to the Statute of Westminster 1931 established the convention requiring the consent of all the Dominion parliaments, as well as that of the United Kingdom, to any alterations to the monarch's style and titles. It had been decided among the realms in 1949 that each should have its own monarchical style and titles, but with common elements. At the 1952 Commonwealth Prime Ministers' Economic Conference, following the accession of Queen Elizabeth II, Commonwealth prime ministers agreed that each member of the Commonwealth "should use for its own purposes a form of the Royal Style and Titles which suits its own particular circumstances but retains a substantial element which is common to all". It was decided that the Queen's style and titles in all her realms have, as their common element, the description of the Sovereign as "Queen of Her Realms and Territories and Head of the Commonwealth". The parliament of each realm passed its own Royal Style and Titles Act before Elizabeth II's coronation in June of the following year.

The proclamation of the Queen's style and titles published in the Ceylon Government Gazette, 1953

The Royal Titles Act was passed by the Parliament of Ceylon on 26 March 1953, which granted parliament's assent to the adoption of separate royal style and titles in relation to Ceylon. The bill received royal assent on 7 April 1953. The Queen assumed the new style and titles by a proclamation, sealed with the Great Seal, on 28 May 1953, following which her Ceylonese royal style and titles became:

Elizabeth the Second, Queen of Ceylon and of Her other Realms and Territories, Head of the Commonwealth

As Ceylon was a predominantly Buddhist nation, the title "Defender of the Faith" was dropped, as it reflected the monarch's position as the supreme governor of the Church of England. The phrase "By the Grace of God" was also omitted.

Prime Minister Dudley Senanayake said that the expression "Queen of Ceylon" signified the true relation between Ceylon and the Queen, and that Elizabeth II was not Queen of Ceylon because she was Queen of England, but because "Ceylon's Constitution provided for it". Following the adoption of the new style and titles, Senanayake said that "Elizabeth II is now our Queen of our free will and accord".

== Succession to the throne ==
Ceylonese stamp commemorating the coronation of Queen Elizabeth II, 1953

Succession to the throne was governed by the laws of Ceylon, which were subject to the control of the Parliament of Ceylon. However, due to the shared monarchy relationship, the line of succession was identical in all the monarch's realms. Succession to the throne was by male-preference primogeniture governed by common law, the Act of Settlement 1701, and the Bill of Rights 1689. These legislations limited the succession to the natural (i.e. non-adopted), legitimate descendants of Sophia, Electress of Hanover, and stipulated that the monarch cannot be a Roman Catholic and must be in communion with the Church of England upon ascending the throne.

When King George VI died in the early hours of 6 February 1952, all government offices, business houses, schools, and shops closed down across the Dominion of Ceylon as a mark of respect. The day of the King's funeral was observed as one of national mourning. George VI was succeeded by his elder daughter, Elizabeth II, as sovereign of Ceylon. The House of Representatives of Ceylon passed a motion of condolence on the death of the King, with an expression of its hope that the new Queen's reign "will be one of great happiness and prosperity to the peoples of the Commonwealth". In the House of Representatives, Prime Minister D. S. Senanayake said: "We look forward to a long and glorious reign, not only in the Island to which Her Majesty returned, but also in this other Island which we in this House have the honour to serve".

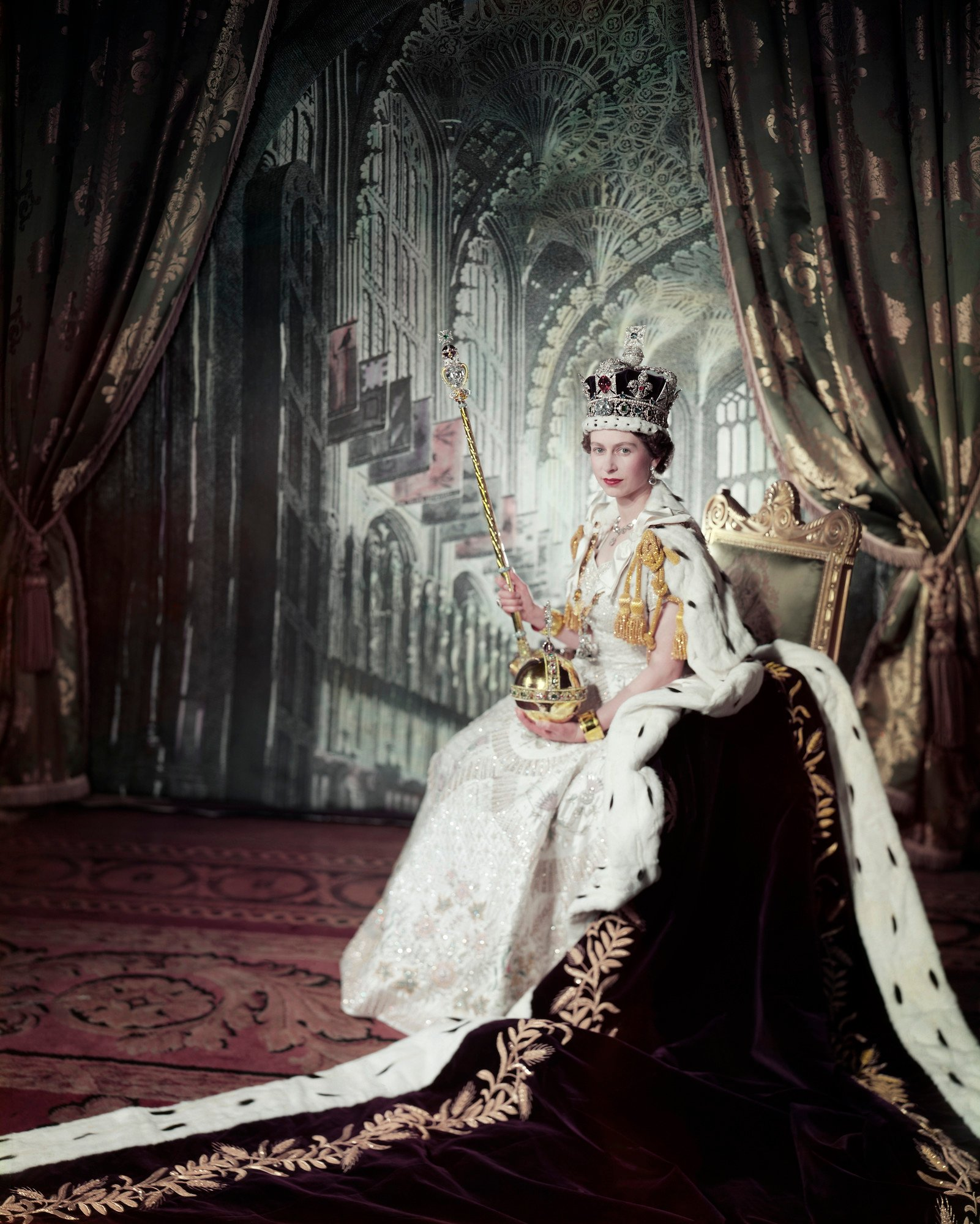
The Coronation gown of Elizabeth II featured the Lotus flower of Ceylon in addition to floral emblems of other Commonwealth nations

On the morning of 8 February 1952, Elizabeth II was proclaimed separately as the queen of Ceylon through a proclamation signed by the governor-general and the members of the cabinet. This proclamation was read from the steps of Parliament House, Colombo in three principal languages of Ceylon: English, Sinhalese and Tamil, to the large crowds outside. A gun-salute was also fired. The bands played God Save The Queen and Namo Namo Matha. The proclamation, in English, read:

Whereas by the decease of our late sovereign Lord King George the Sixth, the Crown is by our laws solely and rightfully come to the High and Mighty Princess Elizabeth Alexandra Mary: We, the Governor-General, the Prime Minister and other Ministers of the Crown in Ceylon do now hereby, with one voice and consent of tongue and heart publish and proclaim that the High and Mighty Princess Elizabeth Alexandra Mary is now, by the death of our late sovereign of happy memory, become our sovereign Queen by the name and style of Elizabeth the Second, to whom her lieges do acknowledge all faith and constant obedience with hearty and humble affection.

On 2 June 1953, Elizabeth II was crowned as Queen of Ceylon and other Commonwealth realms during an ancient ceremony at Westminster Abbey. In her Coronation oath, the Queen promised to govern the people of Ceylon "according to their respective laws and customs". The standard of Ceylon at the coronation was borne by Sir Edwin A. P. Wijeyeratne.

The Coronation gown of Queen Elizabeth II, was embroidered with the floral emblems of each Commonwealth nation, and it featured the Lotus flower of Ceylon, made with opals, mother of pearl, diamante, and soft green silk. The Queen wore her coronation gown when she opened the Parliament of Ceylon during her 1954 tour. This time, however, the glass beads on her dress got heated up so much, which led her to remark that it was "like being in a radiator".

== Cultural role ==
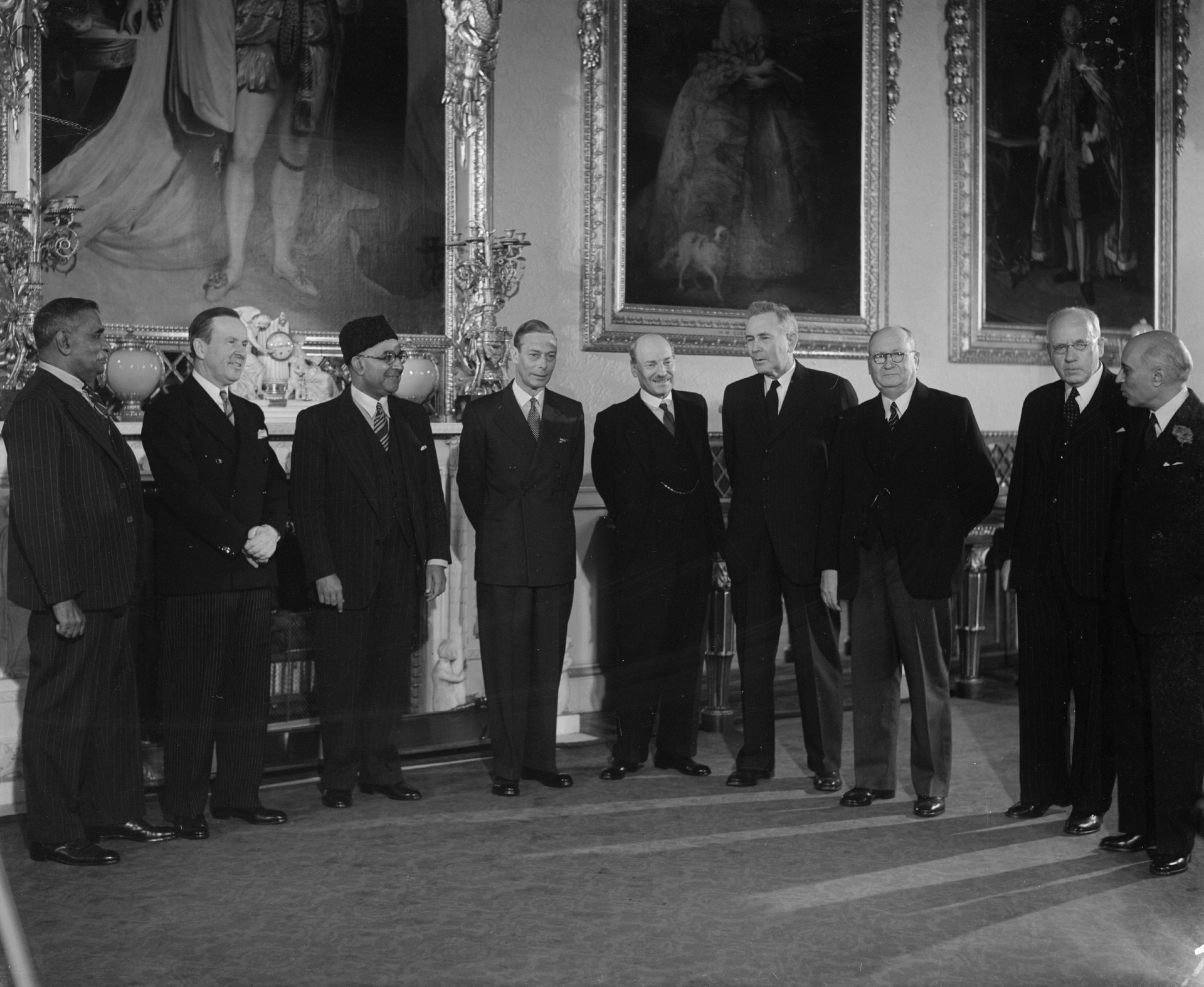
Ceylonese prime minister D. S. Senanayake (first from left) with King George VI and other Commonwealth leaders in London for the 1949 Commonwealth Prime Ministers' Conference

The monarch was described as the "symbol of the nation". At the 1949 Commonwealth Prime Ministers' Conference, Prime Minister D. S. Senanayake said that he represented "the oldest monarchy in the Commonwealth", as George VI was the legitimate and constitutional successor of the Kandyan kings. In 1952, while addressing the House of Representatives, Senanayake said:

There was once an occasion when I had to remind the Commonwealth Prime Ministers that there were Kings of Ceylon before there were Kings of England. We have had Sinhalese Kings and Tamil Kings, Portuguese Kings and British Kings. We have had Queens too. Through the Kandyan Convention by which the sovereignty of the Kandyan Kingdom was vested in King George III, the line can be traced to the landing of Vijaya on our shores nearly 2,500 years ago. I venture to doubt whether there is any other monarchy in the world which has lasted nearly 2,500 years, and certainly there is none in the Commonwealth.

According to Sir Ivor Jennings, through the Kandyan Convention "the sovereignty of the Kandyan provinces was vested in His Britannic Majesty; and the Ceylonese still consider that the Convention is binding on the Queen. Thus, there is a continuous monarchical tradition for over two thousand years". Hence, the Queen on whom the convention was binding could sit on the Kandyan throne in the Assembly hall of the Kandyan kings when she visited Ceylon in 1954.

Prime Minister Sir John Kotelawala referred to Queen Elizabeth II as "our chosen Queen" and hoped that the country would always remain a monarchy within the Commonwealth, rather than becoming a republic.

=== The Crown and Honours ===
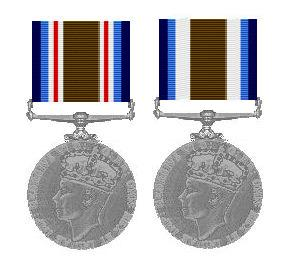
The Ceylon Police Medals for Gallantry (left) and for Meritorious Service (right) featuring the effigy of King George VI

The monarch, as the "fountain of honour", conferred imperial honours to people in Ceylon in his or her name. Most of them were awarded on the advice of the monarch's Ceylonese ministers.

However, in 1956, the government of S.W.R.D. Bandaranaike put an end to the practice of conferment of imperial honours, and requested the Queen that she should "graciously refrain from conferring any honours on citizens of Ceylon". Bandaranaike felt that the practice of accepting imperial honours contradicted the sovereignty and independence of Ceylon.

Medals issued in the island, such as the Ceylon Police Medals for Gallantry and for Meritorious Service, the Ceylon Police Long Service Medal, and the Ceylon Fire Services Long Service Medal, featured the effigy of the sovereign.

=== The Crown and the Armed Forces ===
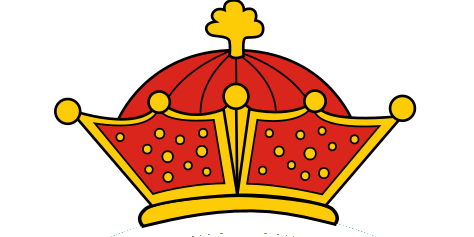
The Ceylon Crown replaced the British-style Crown on the insignia of the army, navy and the air force in 1954.

Ceylon's Armed Forces consisted of the Ceylon Army, the Royal Ceylon Navy, and the Royal Ceylon Air Force. The army was formed in 1949, and the navy and air force were established in 1950 and 1951 respectively. When the Ceylon became a republic in 1972, the prefix "Royal" was dropped as the country renamed the three services as: Sri Lanka Army, Sri Lanka Navy, and the Sri Lanka Air Force.

Ceylon's naval vessels bore the prefix HMCyS, i.e., His/Her Majesty's Ceylon Ship. The Ceylon Crown appeared on the insignia of the army, navy and the air force, which illustrated the monarchy as the locus of authority.

I am very pleased to present these new Colours to the two Battalions. My pleasure is all the greater because the presentation is being made to Battalions of a regiment whose Honorary Colonel is my uncle, the Duke of Gloucester. Your Regiment was formed over seventy years ago and has an honourable record of service. Today I congratulate you on your smartness and efficiency and on your part in this splendid parade. I know that in handing over these colours to you, they will always be in careful and safe keeping.

— Elizabeth II of Ceylon, during a presentation of colours to the Ceylon Light Infantry, 1954

The Crown's relationship with the armed forces was further reflected through the participation of members of the royal family in military ceremonies in Ceylon. Queen Elizabeth II presented new colours to the First Battalion and the Second (Volunteers) Battalion of the Ceylon Light Infantry in Colombo on 21 April 1954. Prince Henry, Duke of Gloucester served as honorary colonel of the Ceylon Light Infantry until 1972. In 1953, troops from Ceylon's Coronation Contingent provided sentries outside Buckingham Palace and St. James's Palace in London to mark the Queen's coronation.

By virtue of his office, the governor-general according to the terms of his appointment was also commander-in-chief of the island of Ceylon. Until 1956, this function, in keeping with British convention, was interpreted as being nominal. During the state of emergency in August–September 1953, it was the prime minister and the cabinet that were in full charge of the police and the armed forces. After 1956, however, due to national crises, there was a shift of power in this sphere to the governor-general. During the island-wide state of emergency proclaimed in 1958, as a result of the widespread communal rioting between Sinhalese and Tamils, Governor-General Sir Oliver Goonetilleke had not only become the supreme commander of the armed forces but its sole administrative head, giving directions to the armed forces and civilian officials. Thus, it became an established principle that the governor-general could assume active command provided the prime minister approved of his instructions and orders to the armed forces.

=== Royal visits ===
In 1870, Prince Alfred, Duke of Edinburgh became the first member of the royal family to visit Ceylon. Albert Edward, Prince of Wales (later Edward VII) visited the island in 1875. Prince Albert Victor and Prince George (later George V) landed in Colombo in 1882 as midshipmen aboard HMS Bacchante. In 1901, the island was visited by the Duke and Duchess of Cornwall and York (later George V and Queen Mary). In 1906, Prince Arthur, Duke of Connaught and Strathearn visited Ceylon and returned the following year to unveil a memorial in Kandy to members of the Ceylon Mounted Rifles (CMR) killed in the Boer War. In March 1922, Edward, Prince of Wales (Edward VIII) arrived in Ceylon during his tour of the Empire. Prince Albert, Duke of York (later George VI) visited Kandy in 1925 on his way to China.

Prince Henry, Duke of Gloucester made three visits to Ceylon, the first being in 1929. The Duke's second visit in 1934 saw the return of the crown and throne of the kings of Kandy, which were taken to Britain in 1815. In 1948, the Duke, accompanied by the Duchess of Gloucester, visited the island to open Ceylon's first parliament after the country gained independence from the United Kingdom.

Princess Elizabeth (later Elizabeth II) and the Duke of Edinburgh were due to visit Ceylon in 1952 during a Commonwealth tour, but the tour was cancelled following the death of King George VI.

External videos
- Queen In Ceylon (1954) Source: British Pathé.

The Queen of Ceylon, Elizabeth II, and the Duke of Edinburgh arrived in the country on 10 April 1954. After being greeted at the quayside by the governor-general and the prime minister, the Queen and the Duke drove in an open car through decorated streets to attend a civic reception at Colombo Town Hall. The welcome, as described by a Ceylonese civil servant, was "inspired by admiration for the person of the Monarch, a real and living sentiment, though only a few perhaps had a vivid perception of the part played by the Crown as a bond of the Commonwealth". Later that afternoon, the Queen broadcast a special message to the people of Ceylon, in which she said: "I hope that my presence here will give you a new sense of unity and nationhood and will help you to feel your membership of that vital family of nations which shares the same hopes and ideals". This was followed in the evening by a state ball given by the governor-general at Queen's House, where the royal couple stayed while in the capital. To mark the Queen's visit, the Ceylonese government granted amnesty to 835 prisoners, who were set free the moment Elizabeth set foot on Ceylon's soil.

The next day, the Queen visited HMCyS Vijaya and lunched onboard HMS Newfoundland with the commander-in-chief, East Indies Station. Later that day, the royal couple attended the Prime Minister's garden party at Temple Trees, the official residence of the prime minister of Ceylon. On 12 April, the Queen, wearing her coronation dress, opened the third session of the second Parliament of Ceylon at Independence Hall and received addresses of welcome and loyalty. Later, the royal couple paid an informal visit to the House of Representatives, and attended a race-meeting at the Ceylon Turf Club.

We deeply appreciate the warmth of the welcome which has been accorded to us on this visit. We hope during our stay here to see some of the scenic beauty of this Island and your ruined cities with their archaeological treasures — a silent and constant reminder of your ancient civilisation.

— Elizabeth II of Ceylon, 1954

On 13 April, the Queen received a delegation from the Maldive Islands, visited an orchid show at Queen's House, and attended a gala performance of Kandyan dances organized by the Arts Council of Ceylon. On 14 April, Elizabeth and Philip visited the ruins of Polonnaruwa, capital of Parakramabahu I in the 12th century, and watched a display of folk-dances by 200 children. From Polonnaruwa, they went to the 6,000-ft hill resort of Nuwara Eliya, where they spent their Easter holidays (15–18 April) at Queen's Cottage, worshipping on Good Friday and Easter Day at Holy Trinity Church. Their only official engagement during this period was a garden-party given by the Planters' Association of Ceylon.

We greet Your Majesty as the Queen of Ceylon, as one of a long line of Sovereigns in this ancient kingdom whose recorded history goes back 2,500 years.

— Sir Oliver Goonetilleke, Leader of the Senate (later Governor-General), 1954

On 18 April, the royal couple drove from Nuwara Eliya to Kandy, the ancient hill capital of the Sinhalese kings. The next morning, the Queen received the homage of 55 Kandyan chiefs at the King's Pavilion, the ancient audience hall of the Kings of Kandy and where the Kandyan Convention was signed in 1815. After the ceremony, the royal couple, accompanied by the prime minister, visited the Temple of the Tooth. From the Octagon of the Temple, the Queen witnessed the Raja Perahera, a two-mile procession of 600 Kandyan chiefs with 125 lavishly caparisoned elephants, 1,000 torchbearers and over 600 Kandyan dancers and drummers.

After royal visits to the Royal Botanic Gardens at Peradeniya, and to the University of Ceylon, the royal couple returned to Colombo on 20 April. On 21 April, the last day of the royal tour, and the Queen's 28th birthday, a crowd of fifty thousand people sang "Happy Birthday" for the Queen. She reviewed troops of the three services: the Army, Navy and the Air Force, and later held an investiture, and appointed Prime Minister Sir John Kotelawala to the Privy Council. Birthday messages from Prince Charles and Princess Anne and members of the royal family were brought by a special courier. In the evening, she and Philip left Ceylon to set out for Aden. Onboard Gothic, Elizabeth broadcast a farewell message, to the Ceylonese people via Radio Ceylon. In the broadcast, the Queen said, "Your welcome, given so generously and spontaneously in city and countryside, has brought you very near to us both, and though we should have liked to stay longer in your beautiful island, we nevertheless feel that our time here has taught us much about your lives, your work and your ideals, which we shall certainly never forget".

As part of a wider tour in 1956, the Duke of Edinburgh returned to Ceylon for a two-day visit during which he visited Holy Emmanuel Church, Moratuwa.

In 1957, a three-week tour by Queen Elizabeth The Queen Mother, to open the Colombo Plan Exhibition, was postponed by the Ceylonese government on the plea that the UNP government had organised it "as a propaganda stunt without giving thought to many aspects of national interest".

=== Religious role ===
Although Queen Elizabeth II was the Supreme Governor of the Church of England in her capacity as Queen of the United Kingdom; she, as Queen of Ceylon, upheld the commitment to safeguard Buddhism in Ceylon under the Kandyan Convention of 1815.

During her 1954 tour, the Queen was welcomed by the chief monks in the sacred Temple of the Tooth in Kandy, which houses the relic of the tooth of the Buddha. On entering the shrine, Elizabeth removed her shoes in keeping with ancient tradition, and was welcomed by Buddhist priests. She presented palm-leaf fans with ivory handles to five of the leading monks. In the inner sanctuary of the temple, Elizabeth viewed a special exposition of the relic, where the customary ceremonies, performed by past Sinhalese monarchs, were gone through by the Queen. Before the Queen's tour, a comment by journalist Janus caused controversy, when he remarked: "The Sovereign is said to be an Anglican in England and a Presbyterian in Scotland, it would be asking rather too much of Queen Elizabeth to regard herself as a Buddhist in Ceylon".

In 1956, the Queen, as sovereign of Ceylon, sent a message of goodwill for the 2500th Buddha Jayanti celebrations, coinciding with the Sixth Buddhist council in Burma.

William Gopallawa, the fourth governor-general of Ceylon, became the first Buddhist to occupy the vice-regal office in 1962. For the first time, a statue of the Buddha was installed at Queen's House, with monks chanting Buddhist scriptures at his swearing-in ceremony. One of his first acts as governor-general was to construct a shrine room at Queen's House.

=== Ceylonese royal symbols ===
Ceylon was the first country to feature Queen Elizabeth II on its banknotes

Royal symbols and references to the monarchy were commonplace in public life across the island of Ceylon. The main symbol of the monarchy was the sovereign; their image appeared on Ceylon's currency. The monarch's profile featured prominently on the banknotes produced by the Central Bank of Ceylon. In 1952, Ceylon became the first country to feature Queen Elizabeth II on their banknotes. However, banknotes issued after 1956 only featured the armorial ensign of Ceylon. The sovereign's effigy also featured on circulating coins in Ceylon until 1963. Moreover, the inscription "O.H.M.S." (On Her Majesty's Service) was used on official envelopes in Ceylon.

Upon independence, God Save The King/Queen was retained as the Ceylon's national anthem until it was replaced by Namo Namo Matha in 1951. However, the former continued to be used as the royal anthem, and was played in the presence of the monarch.

The armorial ensign of Ceylon featuring the Ceylon Crown, signifying the country's status as a monarchy

Ceylon adopted a new armorial ensign in 1954, which featured the Sinhaladipa, or the "Lion of Ceylon", within a garland of lotus petals. At the head of the design was a crown, known as the "Ceylon Crown", signifying the country's status as a monarchy within the Commonwealth of Nations. The Special Commission, reporting on the national arms and badge of Ceylon and ceremonial and other uniforms, had substituted Ceylon's ancient royal crown for the familiar British Crown, as British sovereigns were acclaimed monarchs of Ceylon in succession to the long line of rulers which had ended with King Sri Vikrama Rajasinha of Kandy. The Ceylon Crown also replaced the British Crown in all badges, buttons, crests and other insignia of the army, navy, air force, police service and civil service.

The Queen's Colour of the Ceylon Light Infantry consisted of the National Flag of Ceylon, with the title of the Regiment inscribed in a circle in the centre of its two vertical strips of saffron and green, with the circle surmounted by the Ceylon Crown and above it, the Queen's royal cypher.

Public officials and new citizens were required to swear an oath of allegiance to the monarch. Under the Promissory Oaths Ordinance, the oath of allegiance in Ceylon during the reign of Elizabeth II was:

"I, (name), do swear that I will be faithful and bear true allegiance to Her Majesty Elizabeth the Second, Queen of Ceylon, Her Heirs and Successors, according to law. So help me God."

== Abolition and republic ==
Following the general election of March 1960, the minority UNP government of Dudley Senanayake presented a Throne Speech that promised "early steps for the revision of the Constitution for the purpose of establishing a Republic of Ceylon within the Commonwealth". However, the government was defeated on the Address of Thanks, and the country went to the polls a second time in that year. The new SLFP government, led by Sirimavo Bandaranaike, expressed a willingness for a republic in the Throne Speech of July 1961, but this was not followed up.

When the United Front (UF), led by Bandaranaike, won a landslide victory of over a two-thirds majority in Parliament in the general election of May 1970, the stage was set for radical constitutional changes. In its election manifesto, the UF had sought a mandate to repeal and replace the Soulbury Constitution with a republican constitution in the following terms:

We seek your mandate to permit the Members of Parliament you elect to function simultaneously as a Constituent Assembly to draft, adopt, and operate a new Constitution. This Constitution will declare Ceylon to be a free, sovereign and independent Republic pledged to realise the objectives of a socialist democracy; and it will also secure fundamental rights and freedoms to all citizens.

On 14 June 1970, the first session of the Seventh Parliament was declared open by the governor-general on behalf of the Queen, outlining the government's legislative agenda in his speech from the throne. It read, "By their vote democratically cast the people have given you a clear mandate to function as a Constituent Assembly to draft, adopt, and operate a new Constitution which will declare Ceylon to be a free Sovereign and Independent Republic...". The first meeting of the Constituent Assembly was held at the Navarangahala on 19 July 1970. Prime Minister Sirimavo Bandaranaike moved a resolution that the Members of Parliament form themselves into a Constituent Assembly to enact a new Constitution. Having symbolised the separateness of the two bodies–the Parliament and the Constituent Assembly–the members who were members of both bodies resolved that henceforth they should sit, when sitting as a Constituent Assembly, "in the chamber of the House of Representatives".

As part of constitutional reform, the UF government introduced a bill in parliament seeking to abolish the Senate of Ceylon. On 2 October 1971, the royal assent was received to the Ceylon (Constitution and Independence) Amendment Act No. 36 of 1971 and the Senate was abolished after 23 years of independence. In November 1971, Ceylon's right of appeals to the Judicial Committee of the Privy Council were abolished and a Court of Appeal was set up in its place.

External videos
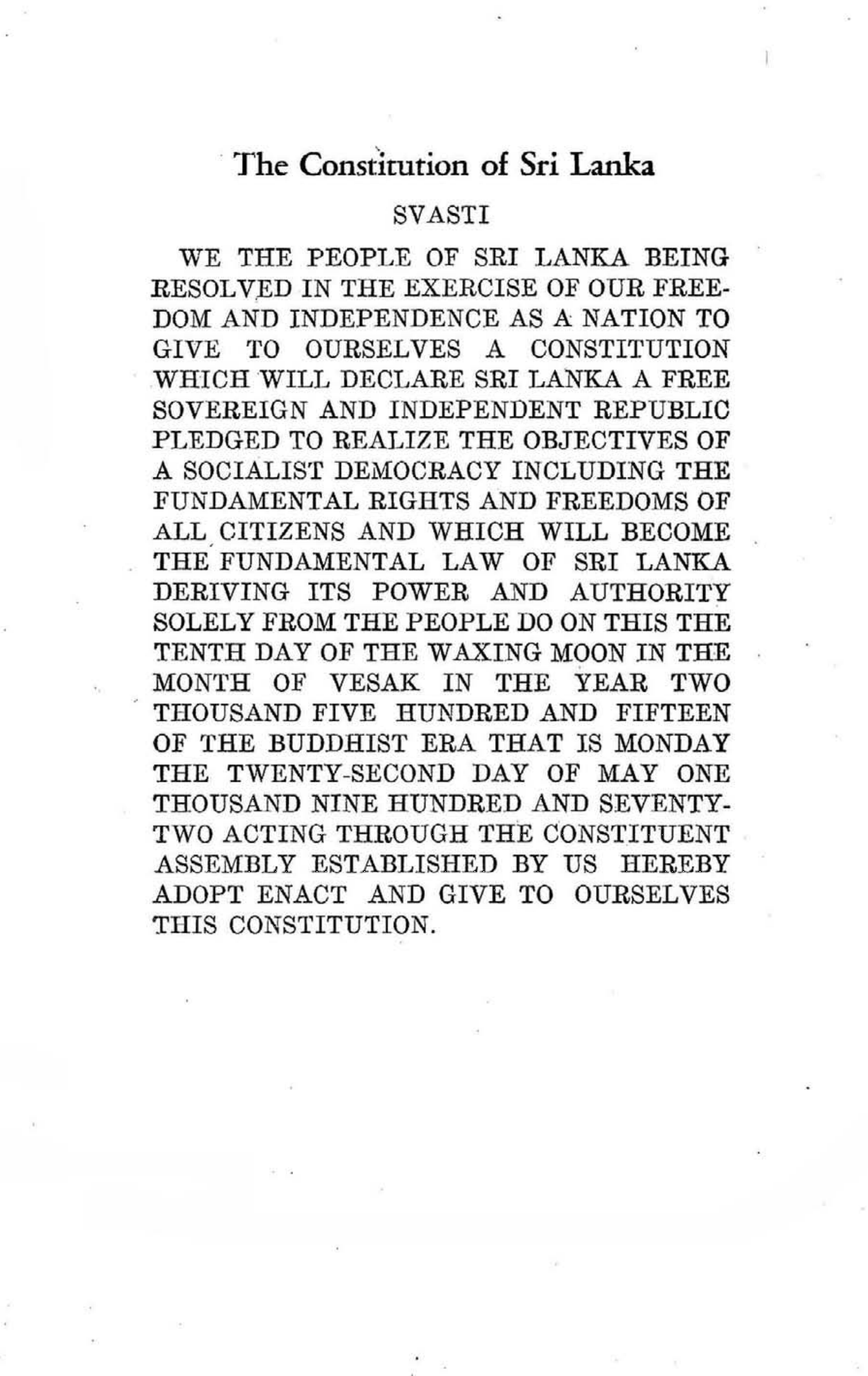
- Page one of the 1972 Constitution of Sri Lanka
- Sri Lanka: Ceylonese Constituent Assembly Passes Constitution Declaring New Republic of Sri Lanka (1972) Source: British Pathé.

A draft constitution was presented to the Constituent Assembly on 29 December 1971, and was later published in the Ceylon Government Gazette as a government notification. On 3 January 1972, the Constituent Assembly met and adopted a resolution confirming that the draft constitution was in accordance with the basic resolutions. The assembly then divided itself into eleven committees for the purpose of examining the draft constitution in greater detail. The reports of the Committees and a draft revised constitution were placed before the Assembly on 8 May 1972.

On 22 May 1972, the Constituent Assembly adopted the draft constitution by 119 votes to 16. The UNP voted against; its leader, Dudley Senanayake, said that the government had chosen to ignore "all and every one of the amendments presented" by the UNP. After the adoption of the draft constitution, the members of the Constituent Assembly, including those from the UNP who had voted against it, adjourned to the Navarangahala where, at the auspicious time of 12:43 p.m., Ceylon became the Republic of Sri Lanka, abandoning its 2,500-year-old monarchical system. Bandaranaike took her oath of office as prime minister, and then nominated the last governor-general, William Gopallawa, as the republic's first president, who thereafter swore allegiance to the new Constitution and took his oath of office. Although there were festivities throughout the island, the day was observed as one of mourning in the northern provinces where black flags were seen flying over some buildings.

The new Constitution of 1978 replaced the previous Westminster-style parliamentary government with an executive presidency based on the French model. The president was to be elected by direct suffrage for a six-year term and was empowered to appoint, with parliamentary approval, the prime minister and to preside over cabinet meetings. J. R. Jayewardene became the first president under the new Constitution and assumed direct control of the government machinery and party.

Queen Elizabeth II toured Sri Lanka as Head of the Commonwealth in 1981, accompanied by Prince Philip, Duke of Edinburgh, to attend the celebrations marking 50 years of universal adult franchise in Sri Lanka. At Galle Face Green, festivities celebrating the nation's progress in democracy, included performances by Sri Lankan schoolchildren and a march by youth. The Queen also inaugurated the British Council's new library at Alfred House Gardens. The royal couple also toured the Victoria Dam project, one of Sri Lanka's largest infrastructure initiatives funded by Britain. The Tribune editorial of 24 October 1981, remarked:

To some the British Royalty was the legitimate successor of the unbroken Sinhala monarchy that had ruled Sri Lanka for more than 2,500 years from the days of Vijaya. Even after the island became a Republic in 1972, she continued to be part of the British Commonwealth and nostalgia for the British Crown continued in many quarters.

Upon the Queen's death in September 2022, flags across Sri Lanka were flown at half-mast until the day of her funeral. White flags were also put up in Galle Face Green and other prominent places throughout the country. The day of the Queen's state funeral was declared a National Day of Mourning, and a special holiday was declared by the government of Sri Lanka for schools and government offices to mourn the Queen's death. In the motion of condolence in the Parliament of Sri Lanka, President Ranil Wickremesinghe paid tribute to Queen Elizabeth II of Ceylon, as the "last of our royal line" which began with King Vijaya, and said, "As Queen of Ceylon, her reign signified the transformation of our country from Ceylon to Sri Lanka".

== List of monarchs ==
No.	Portrait	Regnal name (Birth–Death)	Reign		Full name	Consort	Royal House
No.	Portrait	Regnal name (Birth–Death)	Start	End	Full name	Consort	Royal House
1		George VI (1895–1952)	4 February 1948	6 February 1952	Albert Frederick Arthur George	Elizabeth Bowes-Lyon	Windsor
1		George VI (1895–1952)	Governors-general: Sir Henry Monck-Mason Moore; Herwald Ramsbotham, 1st Viscount Soulbury; Prime ministers: D. S. Senanayake				
2		Elizabeth II (1926–2022)	6 February 1952	22 May 1972	Elizabeth Alexandra Mary	Philip Mountbatten	Windsor
2		Elizabeth II (1926–2022)	Governors-general: Herwald Ramsbotham, 1st Viscount Soulbury; Sir Oliver Ernest Goonetilleke; William Gopallawa; Prime ministers: D. S. Senanayake, Dudley Senanayake, John Kotelawala, S. W. R. D. Bandaranaike, Wijeyananda Dahanayake, Sirimavo Bandaranaike				

== See also ==
- List of heads of state of Sri Lanka
- List of sovereign states headed by Elizabeth II
- List of prime ministers of George VI
- List of prime ministers of Elizabeth II
- List of Commonwealth visits made by Elizabeth II
