= Henry Monck-Mason Moore =

British colonial administrator (1887–1964)

Sir Henry Monck-Mason Moore GCMG KStJ
- Moore in 1942

1st Governor-General of Ceylon
- In office 4 February 1948 – 6 July 1949
- Monarch: George VI
- Prime Minister: D. S. Senanayake
- Preceded by: Post created; Himself as governor
- Succeeded by: The Viscount Soulbury

29th Governor of British Ceylon
- In office 19 September 1944 – 4 February 1948
- Monarch: George VI
- Preceded by: Andrew Caldecott
- Succeeded by: Post abolished; Himself as governor-general

20th Governor of Kenya
- In office 9 January 1940 – 25 October 1944
- Monarch: George VI
- Preceded by: Walter Harragin
- Succeeded by: Philip Mitchell
- In office 27 September 1930 – 13 February 1931
- Monarch: George V
- Preceded by: The Lord Altrincham
- Succeeded by: Joseph Byrne

Governor of Sierra Leone
- In office 17 July 1934 – 21 May 1937
- Monarch: George V
- Preceded by: Arnold Hodson
- Succeeded by: Douglas James Jardine
- Monarch: Edward VIII
- Monarch: George VI

Personal details
- Born: 18 March 1887 London, England, United Kingdom
- Died: 26 March 1964 (aged 77) Cape Town, South Africa
- Spouse: Daphne Ione Viola (m. 1921)
- Children: 2

Sir Henry Monck-Mason Moore GCMG KStJ (18 March 1887 – 26 March 1964) was a British colonial administrator of British Sierra Leone, Kenya and Ceylon.

== Biography ==
The son of Rev. Edward William Moore, he was educated at Rokeby, KCS, Wimbledon and Jesus College, Cambridge, graduating in 1909. In World War I, he was a lieutenant in the Royal Garrison Artillery based in Salonika from 1916 to 1919.

He served as Governor of Sierra Leone from 1934 to 1937. As governor of Sierra Leone he undertook surveys of infrastructure. He undertook a campaign that began by successfully "repairing every road and bridge in the area around Port Loko." It was considered one of the most ambitious and successful such efforts in colonial Africa during the era of the Great Depression. Adding to this, he then began a similar campaign in the Pejehun area, Bonthe and the surrounding area as well as Bo and the surrounding villages. This succeeded in providing employment for large numbers of native workers, as well as increasing commercial infrastructure for later development. However, when the area surrounding Magburaka asked for the same improvements, Governor Moore was unable to get the funds from the Colonial Office. This led to some sections alleging that the coastal areas were being "favoured" by the British government. Governor Moore found this dynamic "most distressing." While it was true that the funds simply had run out, and that Moore's efforts were genuinely made in good faith, the perception of favoritism became one which Moore had to consciously combat from then on. Albert Margai later wrote that he remembered Moore "fondly," and that "he had a reputation for being sincerely compassionate towards us." Milton Margai said Moore was "unhypocritical" and was "never patronising," adding "Moore did not have the sort of superiority complex or condescension that some others from Europe have had." Milton Margai said later, "Monk-Mason Moore was one of the men who gave the British Empire a good name in the eyes of many Africans. It is unfortunate there were not more like him." Siaka Stevens said Moore "was a good man." And that "he (Moore) genuinely meant well, and in most cases he did measurably good things."

In 1937 Moore joined the Colonial Department in London as assistant under secretary of state from 1937 to 1939 and Deputy Under Secretary of State from 1939 to 1940.

From 1940 to 1944, he was Governor of Kenya and then from 1944 to 1948 he was Governor of Ceylon. After the independence of Ceylon in 1948, he served as governor-general until 1950.

He married Daphne Ione Viola, daughter of William John Benson in December 1921. The couple had two daughters. He was the brother of the psychoanalyst Sylvia Payne.

== Awards and honours ==
- Awarded a BA degree in Cambridge University, 1909
- Companion of The Most Distinguished Order of Saint Michael and Saint George (CMG), 1931
- Knight Commander of The Most Distinguished Order of Saint Michael and Saint George (KCMG), 1935
- Knight Grand Cross of The Most Distinguished Order of Saint Michael and Saint George (GCMG), 1943
- Knights of Justice (KStJ) of the Venerable Order of Saint John

Government offices
| Preceded by The Lord Altrincham | Governor of Kenya; 1930–1931 | Succeeded by Joseph Byrne |
| Preceded by Arnold Hodson | Governor of Sierra Leone; 1934–1937 | Succeeded by Douglas James Jardine |
| Preceded by Walter Harragin | Governor of Kenya; 1940–1944 | Succeeded by Philip Mitchell |
| Preceded by Andrew Caldecott | Governor of British Ceylon; 1944–1948 | Post abolished Himself as governor-general |
| New creation Himself as governor | Governor-General of Ceylon; 1948–1949 | Succeeded by The Viscount Soulbury |
