= Governor-General of Ceylon =

Representative of the monarch

- Emblem of the Dominion of Ceylon

- Flag of the governor-general from 1953 to 1972
- Viceregal
- Style: His Excellency
- Status: Abolished
- Residence: Queen's House, Colombo
- Appointer: Monarch of Ceylon; on the advice of the Prime Minister
- Term length: At Her Majesty's pleasure
- Formation: 4 February 1948
- First holder: Sir Henry Monck-Mason Moore
- Final holder: William Gopallawa
- Abolished: 22 May 1972

The governor-general of Ceylon was the representative of the Ceylonese monarch in the Dominion of Ceylon from the country's independence in 1948 until it became the republic of Sri Lanka in 1972.

== History ==
There were four governors-general.

Sir Henry Monck-Mason Moore became the last governor of Ceylon and first governor-general when the Ceylon Order in Council, the first constitution of independent Ceylon came into effect. He was followed by Herwald Ramsbotham, 1st Viscount Soulbury, thereafter by Sir Oliver Goonetilleke the first Ceylonese to be appointed to the post. When William Gopallawa was appointed as governor-general in 1962, he discarded the ceremonial uniform of office.

When Ceylon became a republic in 1972 the office was abolished as the monarch of Ceylon was replaced by the office of President of Sri Lanka.

== Functions ==
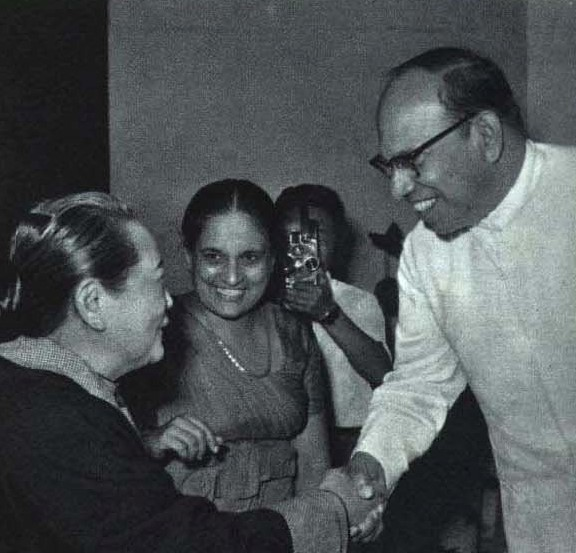
Governor-General William Gopallawa meeting Vice Chairman Soong Ching Ling of Taiwan, 1964

The monarch, on the advice of the prime minister, appointed a governor-general to be his/her representative in Ceylon. Neither the monarch nor the governor-general had any direct role in the day-today administration of the country (however, both possessed reserve powers under the constitution which would allow them full control of the nation's governance whenever in their opinion a case of emergency requiring such action arises). Real legislative and executive responsibilities rested with the elected representatives of the people. During several periods when a state of emergency was declared the governor-general used his reserved powers. In the absence of the governor-general, the chief justice of Ceylon became acting governor-general.

=== Powers exercised on the advice of the prime minister ===
The governor-general was required to assent all bills passed in parliament to become an Act, by convention all bills received assent. In addition, the constitution and other legislation granted the governor-general powers to be carried out on advice of the prime minister, these included;

- Appointment of public inquires
- Command of the armed forces
- Ability to declare a state of emergency under the Public Security Ordinance.
- Summoning of parliament
- Marking appointments;
  - Members of the Senate of Ceylon
  - Six appointed members of the House of Representatives of Ceylon
  - Members of the Public Service Commission (Ceylon)
  - Members of the Judicial Service Commission (Ceylon)
  - Judges of the Supreme Court of Ceylon
  - Ministers of Cabinet
  - Parliamentary Sectaries
  - Secretary to the Cabinet
  - Permanent Sectaries
  - Auditor General of Ceylon
  - Attorney General of Ceylon
  - Commissioner of Elections

=== Discretionary powers ===
The governor-general had the discretionary powers to appoint the prime minister, dissolve parliament and dismissal of a government that refuses to resign. The governor-general administers the oath of office of ministers and parliamentary secretaries. It is to the governor-general they would tender their resignations too.

=== Constitutional role ===
The governor-general represented the monarch on ceremonial occasions such as the opening of Parliament, the presentation of honours and military parades. Under the Constitution, he was given authority to act in some matters, for example in appointing and disciplining officers of the civil service, in proroguing Parliament and so on, but only in a few cases was he empowered to act entirely on his own discretion.

== Governor-general's staff ==
The governor-general had a permanent staff that was based at the Queen's House to assist in execution of his duties.

- Secretary to the Governor-General
- Private Secretary to the Governor-General
- Aide-de-camp to the Governor-General
- Maha Mudaliyar (Head Mudaliyar)
- Office Assistant, Governor-General's office

The Governor-General several Extra Aides-de-camp to serve on a permanent or ad hoc basis. The Governor-General also maintained a ceremonial Lascarin Guard.

== Vice-regal residences ==
The official residence and workplace of the governor-general of Ceylon was Queen's House, in the city of Colombo. All governors-general lived there until 1972, when the monarchy was abolished, and the residence was thereafter renamed President's House.

Other vice-regal residences included the King's Pavilion, in Kandy, used for rare state functions; and the Queen's Cottage, the vacationing residence of governors-general in the town of Nuwara Eliya.

== List of governors-general ==
No.	Portrait	Name (Birth–Death)	Term of office			Monarch (Reign)
No.	Portrait	Name (Birth–Death)	Took office	Left office	Time in office	Monarch (Reign)
1		Sir Henry Monck-Mason Moore (1887–1964)	4 February 1948	6 July 1949	1 year, 152 days	George VI (r. 1948–1952)
2		Herwald Ramsbotham, 1st Viscount Soulbury (1887–1971)	6 July 1949	17 July 1954	5 years, 11 days	George VI (r. 1948–1952)
2		Herwald Ramsbotham, 1st Viscount Soulbury (1887–1971)	6 July 1949	17 July 1954	5 years, 11 days	Elizabeth II (r. 1952–1972)
3		Sir Oliver Goonetilleke (1892–1978)	17 July 1954	2 March 1962	7 years, 228 days	Elizabeth II (r. 1952–1972)
4		William Gopallawa, MBE (1896–1981)	2 March 1962	22 May 1972	10 years, 81 days	Elizabeth II (r. 1952–1972)

== Flag of the governor-general ==
Flag used from 1948 to 1953

Flag used from 1953 to 1972
