= William Gopallawa =

President of Sri Lanka from 1972 to 1978

His Excellency William Gopallawa MBE
- විලියම් ගොපල්ලව; வில்லியம் கோப்பல்லாவ
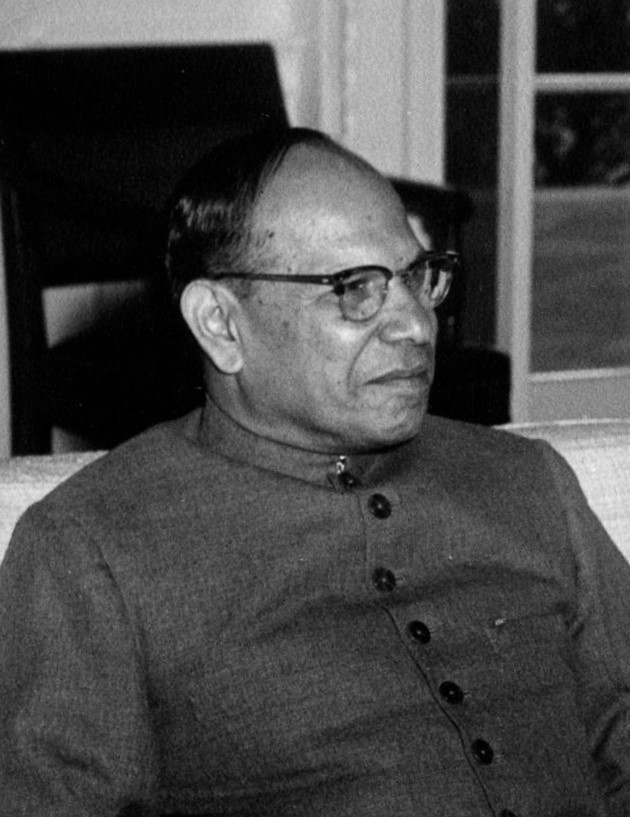
- Gopallawa in 1961

1st President of Sri Lanka
- In office 22 May 1972 – 4 February 1978
- Prime Minister: Sirimavo Bandaranaike; Junius Richard Jayewardene
- Preceded by: Office established (Elizabeth II as Queen of Ceylon)
- Succeeded by: Junius Richard Jayewardene

4th Governor-General of Ceylon
- In office 2 March 1962 – 22 May 1972
- Monarch: Elizabeth II
- Prime Minister: Sirimavo Bandaranaike; Dudley Senanayake
- Preceded by: Sir Oliver Ernest Goonetilleke
- Succeeded by: Office abolished (Himself as President of Sri Lanka)

5th Secretary General of the Non-Aligned Movement
- In office 16 August 1976 – 4 February 1978
- Preceded by: Houari Boumédienne
- Succeeded by: Junius Richard Jayawardene

Personal details
- Born: 17 September 1896 Matale, British Ceylon
- Died: 31 January 1981 (aged 84) Colombo, Sri Lanka
- Party: Independent
- Spouse: Seelawathie Rambukwella (m. 1928; died 1977)
- Children: 5
- Education: Dharmaraja College; St Anthony's College, Kandy

William Gopallawa MBE (Sinhala: විලියම් ගොපල්ලව, Tamil: வில்லியம் கோப்பல்லாவ; 17 September 1896 – 31 January 1981) was a Sri Lankan statesman who served as the last Governor-General of Ceylon from 1962 to 1972. That year, Ceylon became a republic, and changed its name to Sri Lanka; he would serve as the first and only non-executive President of Sri Lanka until 1978.

Gopallawa served as Governor-General during the tenure of three different governments, two headed by Sirimavo Bandaranaike of the Sri Lanka Freedom Party and one headed by Dudley Senanayake of the United National Party. Gopallawa has been described as a reformist.

== Early life and education ==
William Gopallawa was born on 17 September 1896 at the Dullewe Maha Walauwa, Dullewe, Aluvihare, a suburb of Matale. He was related to Dullewe Dissava, a signatory on behalf of the Sinhalese to the Kandiyan Convention of 1815, by his mother Tikiri Kumarihamy Dullewe. His father, Tikiri Bandara Gopallawa, died when he was three years old.

Gopallawa received his primary education at the Dullewe village school and at St. John's College, Kandy. He continued his secondary education at Dharmaraja College, Kandy where he was a Scout and later moved to St. Anthony's College, Kandy. After having sat the Cambridge Senior Certificate Examination in 1917, he returned to Matale and joined as one of the tutorial staff of Buddhist English School. He was instrumental in setting up a library and a scout troop at the school.

== Legal career ==
In 1920, Gopallawa joined Ceylon Law College in Colombo and was enrolled as a proctor and notary public in 1924. He started his legal practice as a junior to Bernard Aluwihare in the unofficial bar of Kandy and went on to develop a practice in Matale, Dumbara and Kandy from 1924 until he took up duties as Municipal Commissioner in 1939. He continued his practice on and off until he became the Municipal Commissioner of the Colombo Municipal Council.

== Political career ==
In 1926, Gopallawa contested and won in the Matale Urban Council elections, and served continuously in the council for a period of 13 years from 1926 to 1939. He served as the chairman of the Matale Urban Council for 5 years, and was the youngest Urban Council Chairman in Ceylon at the time. In 1936, Gopallawa unsuccessfully contested for the Matale seat in the 1936 Ceylonese State Council elections.

In 1939, the Kandy Municipal Council was established and Gopallawa was appointed as the first municipal commissioner of Kandy. He served in this capacity throughout World War II and acquitted himself for efficiency during the intense floods in 1950. In 1951, he was appointed as municipal commissioner of the Colombo Municipal Council and served until 1957, when he stepped down from the post. He was appointed a Member of the Order of the British Empire in the 1953 Coronation Honours.

== Diplomatic career ==
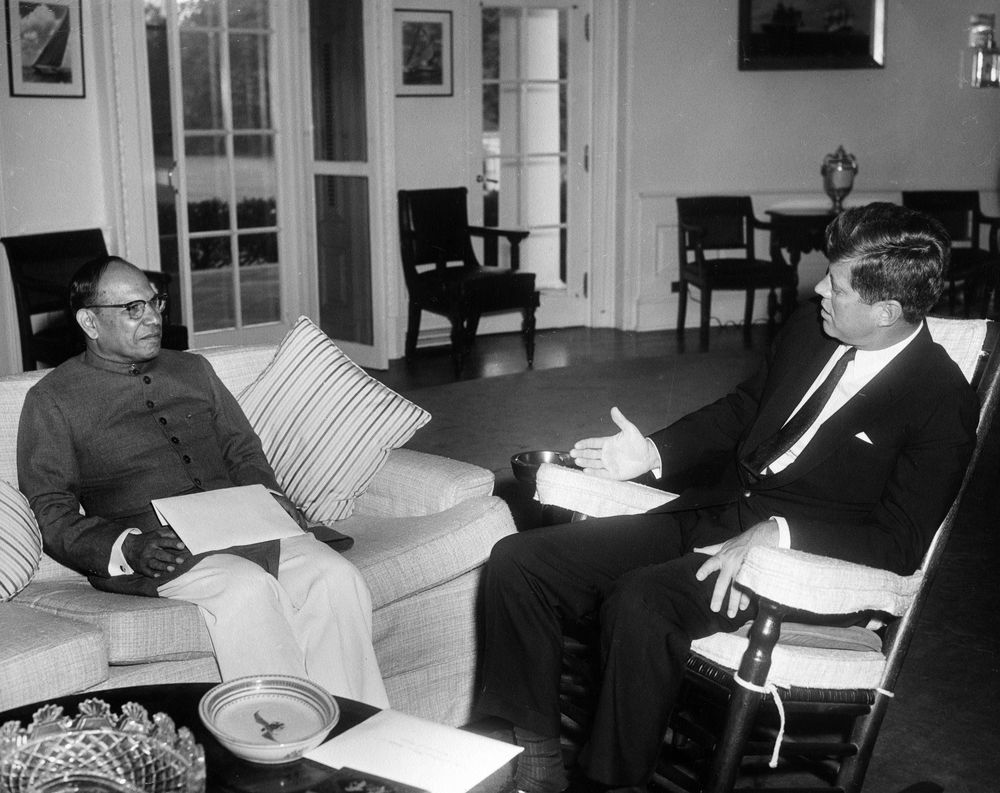
Ambassador William Gopallawa meets with President of the United States John F. Kennedy in the Oval Office of the White House, 7 September 1961

On 18 June 1958 when S. W. R. D. Bandaranaike's government started diplomatic relations with the People's Republic of China, Gopallawa was posted as the second Ambassador to China in 1960. On 7 September 1961, while he was serving in China, he was recalled and posted as the Ambassador to the United States; he served there until 1962.

== Governor-general (1962–1972) ==
In 1962, Gopallawa was called back to Ceylon, after his son in law's sister, then-incumbent prime minister Sirimavo Bandaranaike, nominated Gopallawa as governor-general of Ceylon following Sir Oliver Goonetilleke's implication in the failed military coup attempt earlier that year. Gopallawa was the second native Ceylonese governor-general and the first Buddhist to hold the post as the viceregal representative of Queen Elizabeth II, who was the head of state. Gopallawa served in this capacity until 1972, when he became the first president of Sri Lanka.

Gopallawa's constitutional decision to invite the United National Party (UNP), which won the majority of parliamentary seats in the 1965 general election, is heralded as a landmark moment where he respected the nation's constitution and its people's wishes more than the wishes of the defeated Sri Lanka Freedom Party (SLFP) government who had first appointed him, who wanted him to delay inviting the winning party to form a government. Gopallawa's decision averted a major crisis of leadership.

== Presidency (1972–1978) ==
When Ceylon became the Republic of Sri Lanka on 22 May 1972, Gopallawa became the island's first president. Like the post of governor-general which it replaced, the presidency was largely ceremonial. Gopallawa stepped down from the presidency in February 1978, when then prime minister J. R. Jayewardene drafted a new constitution and created the executive presidency, thus enabling Jayawardene to ascend to the presidency.

=== International presidential trips ===
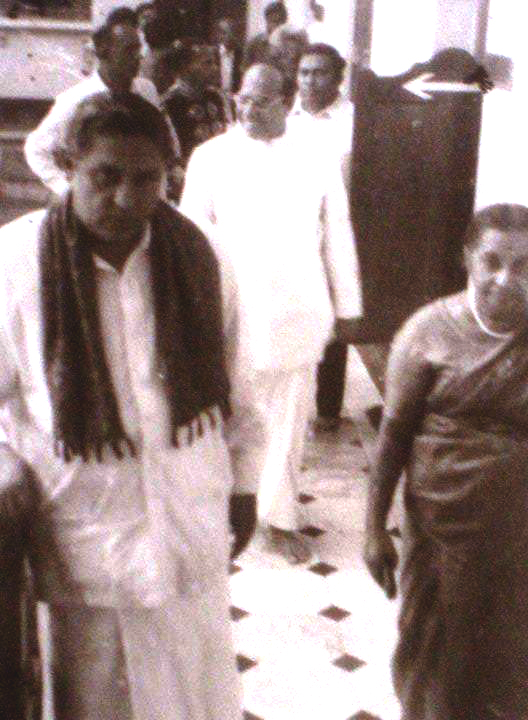
President William Gopallawa and First Lady Seela Gopallawa with Diyawadana Nilame Dr. Nissanka Wijeyeratne at the Sri Dalada Maligawa, Kandy

Summary of international trips

Gopallawa made 2 foreign trips to 3 countries as president.

No. of visits	Country
1	Bangladesh, India, Nepal

1975

No.	Country	Areas visited	Date(s)	Purpose(s)	Notes	Ref.
1	India	New Delhi	19 February – 1 March 1975	Coronation of Birendra of Nepal	See also: Nepal–Sri Lanka relations Represented Sri Lanka at the coronation of Crown Prince Birendra. Transited in New Delhi, India en route to and from Sri Lanka.	
1	Nepal	Kathmandu	19 February – 1 March 1975	Coronation of Birendra of Nepal	See also: Nepal–Sri Lanka relations Represented Sri Lanka at the coronation of Crown Prince Birendra. Transited in New Delhi, India en route to and from Sri Lanka.	

1977

No.	Country	Areas visited	Date(s)	Purpose(s)	Notes	Ref.
2	Bangladesh	Dhaka	17 March–? 1977	State visit	See also: Bangladesh–Sri Lanka relations State visit focused on regional cooperation and bilateral discussions following the General Trade Agreement signed in February earlier that year.	

== Honours ==
- Member of The Most Excellent Order of the British Empire (MBE) in 1953
- LLD (Honoris Causa) from the University of Ceylon in 1962
- LLD from the Vidyalankara in 1962
- D.Litt. from the Vidyodaya in 1962

== See also ==
- List of political families in Sri Lanka
- List of Sri Lankan non-career diplomats

Political offices
Preceded by Sir Oliver Ernest Goonetilleke	Governor-General of Ceylon; 1962–1972	Position abolished
Preceded by Elizabeth II as Queen of Ceylon	President of Sri Lanka; 1972–1978	Succeeded by Junius Richard Jayewardene
