= Dominion of Ceylon =

British dominion in Asia from 1948 to 1972

Ceylon
- 1948–1972
- Top: Flag (1948–1951); Bottom: Flag (1951–1972) Coat of arms
- Anthem: Sri Lanka Matha (1951–1972) God Save the King (1948–1951)
- Capital and largest city: Colombo; 6°56′04″N 79°50′34″E
- Common languages: Sinhala; Tamil; English
- Religion: Buddhism (official); Hinduism; Christianity; Islam
- Demonym: Ceylonese
- Government: Parliamentary constitutional monarchy
- Monarch
  - 1948–1952: George VI
  - 1952–1972: Elizabeth II
- Governor-General
  - 1948–1949: Sir Henry Monck-Mason Moore
  - 1949–1954: Lord Soulbury
  - 1954–1962: Sir Oliver Ernest Goonetilleke
  - 1962–1972: William Gopallawa
- Prime Minister
  - 1948–1952: D. S. Senanayake
  - 1952–1953: Dudley Senanayake
  - 1953–1956: Sir John Kotelawala
  - 1956–1959: S. W. R. D. Bandaranaike
  - March 1960 – July 1960: Dudley Senanayake
  - July 1960–1965: Sirimavo Bandaranaike
  - 1965–1970: Dudley Senanayake
  - 1970–1972: Sirimavo Bandaranaike
- Legislature: Parliament of Ceylon
  - Upper house: Senate
  - Lower house: House of Representatives

Establishment
  - Sri Lankan Independence: 4 February 1948
  - Republic: 22 May 1972

Area
- 1956: 65,610 km^{2} (25,330 sq mi)

Population
  - 1956: 8,104,000
- Currency: Ceylonese rupee
Preceded by	Succeeded by
British Ceylon	Sri Lanka
- "Sri Lanka". Archived from the original on 9 January 2021.

The Dominion of Ceylon, officially Ceylon, was an independent country in the Commonwealth of Nations from 1948 to 1972, that shared a monarch with other dominions of the Commonwealth. In 1948, the British Colony of Ceylon was granted independence as Ceylon. In 1972, the country became a republic within the Commonwealth, and its name was changed to Sri Lanka.

== History ==
=== Independence and growth ===
Following the Second World War, public pressure for independence increased. The British-ruled Colony of Ceylon achieved independence on 4 February 1948, with an amended constitution taking effect on the same date. Independence was granted under the Ceylon Independence Act 1947. Military treaties with the United Kingdom preserved intact British air and sea bases in the country; British officers also continued to fill most of the upper ranks of the Ceylon Army. Don Stephen Senanayake became the first prime minister of Ceylon. Later in 1948, when Ceylon applied for United Nations membership, the Soviet Union vetoed the application. This was partly because the Soviet Union believed that Ceylon was only nominally independent, and the British still exercised control over it because the white, educated elite had control of the government. In 1949, with the concurrence of the leaders of the Sri Lankan Tamils, the UNP government disenfranchised the Indian Tamil plantation workers.

D. S. Senanayake died in 1952 after a stroke and he was succeeded by his son Dudley. However, in 1953 – following a massive general strike or 'Hartal' by the leftist parties against the UNP – Dudley Senanayake resigned. He was followed by General Sir John L. Kotelawala, a senior politician and military commander and an uncle of Dudley. Kotelawala did not have the personal prestige or the political acumen of D. S. Senanayake. He brought to the fore the issue of national languages that D. S. Senanayake had suspended. Elizabeth II, Queen of Ceylon, toured the island in 1954 from 10 to 21 April (she also visited in 1981 from 21 to 25 October after the country became a republic.).

In 1957 British bases were removed and Ceylon officially became a "non-aligned" country. The Paddy Lands Act, the brainchild of Philip Gunawardena, was passed, giving those working the land greater rights vis-à-vis absentee landlords.

=== Reform ===
In 1962, under the SLFP government, many Western business assets were nationalised. This caused disputes with the United States and the United Kingdom over compensation for seized assets. Such policies led to a temporary decline in SLFP power, and the UNP gained seats in Congress. However, by 1970, the SLFP were once again the dominant power.

A Marxist People's Liberation Front rebellion was put down with the help of British, Soviet, and Indian aid in 1972. That same year, the country officially became a republic within the Commonwealth and was renamed Sri Lanka, with William Gopallawa serving as its first president.

== Government and politics ==
The constitution of Ceylon created a parliamentary democracy with a bicameral legislature consisting of a Senate and a House of Representatives, with the popularly elected House indirectly naming the Senate.

== Economy ==
The economy of Ceylon was mainly agriculture-based, with key exports consisting of tea, rubber, and coconuts. These did well in the foreign markets, accounting for 90% of the export share by value. In 1965, Ceylon became the world's leading exporter of tea, with 200,000 tonnes of tea being shipped internationally annually. The exports sold well initially, but falling tea and rubber prices decreased the earnings, with a rapidly increasing population cutting further into those profits. In the early 1970s, the Ceylon government nationalised many privately held assets as part of the newly elected government's socialist policies.

The Land Reform Law of 1972 imposed a maximum of twenty hectares of land that could be owned privately, and sought to reallocate excess land for the benefit of the landless workers. Because land owned by public companies under that was less than ten hectares in size was exempted from the law, a considerable amount of land that would otherwise have been available for redistribution was not subject to the legislation. Between 1972 and 1974, the Land Reform Commission set up by the new laws took over nearly 228,000 hectares, one-third of which was forest and most of the rest planted with tea, rubber, or coconut. Few rice paddies were affected because nearly 95 percent of them were below the ceiling limit. Very little of the land acquired by the government was transferred to individuals. Most were turned over to various government agencies or to cooperative organisations, such as the Up-Country Co-operative Estates Development Board. The Land Reform Law of 1972 applied only to holdings of individuals. It left untouched the plantations owned by joint-stock companies, many of them British. In 1975 the Land Reform (Amendment) Law brought these estates under state control. Over 169,000 hectares comprising 395 estates were taken over under this legislation. Most of this land was planted with tea and rubber. As a result, about two-thirds of land cultivated with tea was placed in the state sector. The respective proportions for rubber and coconut were 32 and 10 percent. The government paid some compensation to the owners of land taken over under both the 1972 and 1975 laws. In early 1988, the state-owned plantations were managed by one of two types of entities, the Janatha Estates Development Board, or the Sri Lanka State Plantation Corporation.

=== Currency ===
The official currency of Ceylon was the Ceylon Rupee. The Rupee evolved from the Indian Rupee, when in 1929 a new Ceylon Rupee was formed when it was separated from the Indian Rupee. In 1950, the Currency Board, set up in 1872 as a part of the Indian monetary system, was replaced by the Central Bank of Ceylon, granting the country greater control over the currency. In 1951, the Central Bank of Ceylon took over the issuance of paper money, introducing 1 and 10 rupees notes. These were followed in 1952 by 2, 5, 50 and 100 rupees notes. The 1 rupee notes were replaced by coins in 1963. In 1963, a new coinage was introduced which omitted the monarch's portrait. Coins issued were aluminium 1 and 2 cents, nickel brass 5 and 10 cents and cupro-nickel 25 and 50 cents and 1 rupee. The obverse of the coins issued since 1963 carries the coat of arms. However, until 1966, the Ceylon Rupee remained pegged to the Indian Rupee at a value of 1:1. In 1966, the Ceylon Rupee was pegged to the US Dollar at 4.76 rupees per US Dollar.

== Military ==
=== Army ===
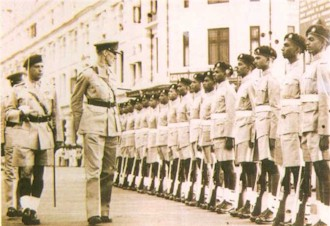
The Earl of Caithness inspecting a guard unit, 1950

At the end of World War II, the Ceylon Defence Force, the predecessor to the Ceylon Army, began demobilisation. After Independence, Ceylon entered the bi-lateral Anglo-Ceylonese Defence Agreement of 1947. This was followed by Army Act No. 17 of which was passed by Parliament on 11 April 1949, and formalised in Gazette Extraordinary No. 10028 of 10 October 1949. It marked the creation of the Ceylon Army, consisting of a regular and volunteer force, the latter being the successor of the disbanded Ceylon Defence Force.

Due to a lack of any major external threats, the growth of the army was slow, and the primary duties of the army quickly moved towards internal security by the mid-1950s. The first internal security operation of the Ceylon Army, code-named Operation Monty, began in 1952 to counter the influx of illegal South Indian immigrants brought in by smugglers, in support of Royal Ceylon Navy coastal patrols and police operations. This was expanded and renamed as Task Force Anti-Illicit Immigration (TaFII) in 1963 and continued up to 1981. The Army was mobilised to help the police to restore peace under provincial emergency regulations during the 1953 hartal, the 1956 Gal Oya Valley riots and in 1958 it was deployed for the first time under emergency regulations throughout the island during the 1958 riots.

=== Air Force ===
The Royal Ceylon Air Force first went into combat in 1971 when the Marxist JVP launched an island-wide coup on 5 April. The Ceylon Armed Forces could not respond immediately and efficiently; police stations island-wide and the RCyAF base at Ekala were struck in the initial attacks. Later, the Air Force acquired additional aircraft from the US and the USSR.

Because of a shortage of funds for military expenditure in the wake of the 1971 uprising, the No. 4 Helicopter Squadron began operating commercial transport services for foreign tourists under the name of Helitours.
