= List of Trinity College, Kandy alumni =

This is a list of alumni of Trinity College, Kandy, Sri Lanka, commonly referred to as Old Trinitians, organised alphabetically by surname.

== A ==
- Ajith Abeyratne (1948–2023) – rugby union player, administrator, commentator and coach.
- L. O. Abeyaratne (1893–1978) – Ceylonese paediatrician and Member of Parliament.
- Saliya Upul Aladeniya † (1963–1990) – Captain, Sri Lanka Army; first recipient of the Parama Weera Vibhushanaya, Sri Lanka's highest military decoration.
- W. T. I. Alagaratnam (1895–1977) – engineer and Director of Irrigation.
- Bernard Aluwihare (1902–1961) – Cabinet minister.
- Richard Aluwihare (1895–1976) – first Ceylonese and 12th Inspector General of Police (1946–1955), high commissioner to India and veteran of World War I.
- Dilum Amunugama (born 1981) – Cabinet minister.
- Sarath Amunugama (born 1939) – Cabinet minister.
- John Attygalle (1906–1981) – 16th Inspector General of Police (1966–1967).

== B ==
- Tissa Balalle (born 1937) – Member of Parliament and governor of North Western Province.
- Cecil Balmond (born 1943) – Deputy chairman of Arup Group, designer, artist and writer.
- Michael Banda (1930–2014) – Trotskyist and General Secretary of the British Workers Revolutionary Party.
- Senaka Bibile (1920–1977) – Professor of pharmacology, Dean of the Faculty of Medicine and founder of the State Pharmaceuticals Corporation.
- Louis Edmund Blaze (1861–1951) – founder of Kingswood College, Kandy.
- Hasitha Boyagoda (born 1998) – first-class cricketer.
- Edward Buultjens (1913–1980) – national cricketer and rugby union player.

== C ==
- V. Coomaraswamy (1892–1972) – Ceylonese high commissioner to Canada.
- R. R. Crossette-Thambiah (1897–?) – 18th Solicitor General of Ceylon (1950–1951), commissioner of assize and barrister.

== D ==
- Bertie de Silva (1901–1981) – Conservator of Forests of the Forest Department, civil servant and first-class cricketer.
- Desmond de Silva (1939–2018) – criminal law barrister, international lawyer and chief prosecutor of the Special Court for Sierra Leone.
- Fredrick de Silva (1912–1993) – Member of Parliament, mayor of Kandy and ambassador to France.
- Janak de Silva – Puisne justice of the Supreme Court of Sri Lanka (since 2020), judge of the Court of Appeal and Senior Deputy Solicitor General.
- Lucien Macull Dominic de Silva (1893–1962) – Puisne justice of the Supreme Court of Sri Lanka and Solicitor General.
- Kemal Deen – professor, academic, surgeon and consultant in gastrointestinal surgery.
- Jayantha Dhanapala (1938–2023) – UN Under-Secretary-General for Disarmament Affairs (1998–2003) and ambassador to the United States.
- N. Q. Dias – civil servant and high commissioner to India.
- Niroshan Dickwella (born 1993) – national cricketer.
- Gamini Dissanayake (1942–1994) – 9th Leader of the Opposition, cabinet minister, presidential candidate and sports administrator.
- Gishan Dissanaike – economist, Dean of Cambridge Judge Business School.
- Wimal Dissanayake (1939–2026) – writer, academic, university professor and film critic.
- Samantha Dodanwela (born 1970) – first-class cricketer and businessman.
- B. H. Dunuwille (1896–?) – Member of the Senate of Ceylon; father of Harindra Dunuwille.
- Harindra Dunuwille (born 1946) – Member of Parliament, mayor of Kandy and first-class cricketer.

== E ==
- Narendra Ekanayake (born 1977) – captain of the Bahamas national cricket team.

== G ==
- Jabez Gnanapragasam (1924–1997) – 12th Anglican Bishop of Colombo.
- Kushil Gunasekera – businessman, philanthropist and first-class cricketer.
- Chandra Dharma Sena Gooneratne (1899–1981) – lecturer, historian, poet, diplomat, social activist and military officer; veteran of World War I and World War II.

== H ==
- John Halangode – Brigadier, Sri Lanka Army and founder of Gemunu Watch.
- Kabir Hashim (born 1959) – Cabinet minister.
- Kanaka Herath (born 1976) – Cabinet minister.
- E. L. B. Hurulle (1919–2009) – Cabinet minister and governor of Central and North Central Provinces.

== I ==
- P. C. Imbulana (1920–2012) – Cabinet minister and governor of Central Province.
- Quentin Israel (1934–2007) – rugby union player, coach and school teacher.

== J ==
- Douglas St. Clive Budd Jansze (1909–1966) – 31st Attorney General of Ceylon (1957–1966) and 20th Solicitor General of Ceylon (1955–1957).
- Lakshman Jayakody (1930–2010) – Cabinet minister.
- Atma Jayaram (1915–1990) – 5th Director of the Intelligence Bureau of India (1971–1975).
- Anuradha Jayaratne (born 1985) – State minister.
- Bandula Jayasekara (c. 1960–2021) – journalist, broadcaster, newspaper editor and diplomat.
- W. T. Jayasinghe – civil servant and ministerial secretary.
- CAHP Jayawardena (1898–1986) – Brigadier, Ceylon Army; forest conservator, equerry to Queen Elizabeth II and aide-de-camp to the Governor-General of Ceylon.
- Japana Jayawardena (born 1947) – Brigadier, Sri Lanka Army; rugby union player and sports administrator.
- M. D. H. Jayawardena (1915–1986) – Cabinet minister, lawyer and businessman.

== K ==
- Lakshman Kadirgamar (1932–2005) – Cabinet minister.
- Michael Kawalya Kagwa (died 1971) – Katikkiro of Buganda (1945–1950).
- Chelva Kanaganayakam (1952–2014) – university professor, academic, author and translator.
- Neville Karunatilake (1930–2010) – 8th Governor of the Central Bank of Sri Lanka (1988–1992), civil servant and economist.
- Jayantha Kelegama (1928–2005) – economist.
- George Keyt (1901–1993) – artist and painter.
- Denzil Kobbekaduwa † (1940–1992) – Lieutenant general, Sri Lanka Army; General officer commanding Northern Province.
- Hector Kobbekaduwa (1916–1983) – Cabinet minister and presidential candidate.
- Tikiri Kobbekaduwa – Governor of Central (2005–2015) and Sabaragamuwa (2019–2023) Provinces.
- Gladwin Kotelawala (1914–?) – Member of Parliament and businessman.
- J. C. T. Kotelawala (1910–1992) – Member of Parliament and ambassador to the Soviet Union.
- Parami Kulatunga † (1951–2006) – Lieutenant general, Sri Lanka Army; 18th Deputy chief of staff (2005–2006).
- Lahiru Kumara (born 1997) – national cricketer.

== L ==
- Graeme Labrooy (born 1964) – national cricketer.
- Mohamed Latheef (1951–2022) – Member of the People's Majlis of Maldives, politician, co-founder of the Maldivian Democratic Party and human rights activist.

== M ==
- Godfrey Edward Madawala (1878–1932) – Member of both the Legislative Council and the State Council of Ceylon.
- Ranjan Madugalle (born 1959) – captain of the Sri Lanka national cricket team and chief of the Elite Panel of ICC Referees.
- Dilantha Malagamuwa (born 1963) – racing driver.
- Suraj Mapa (born 1980) – actor, producer, choreographer, dancer and model.
- Theodore Barcroft L. Moonemalle (1868–?) – Member of the Legislative Council of Ceylon.
- Faisz Musthapha – Chairman of the Human Rights Commission of Sri Lanka and high commissioner to the United Kingdom.

== N ==
- Alan Nugawela (died 2007) – Colonel, Ceylon Army; aide-de-camp to the Governor-General and planter.
- Derrick Nugawela – Colonel, Ceylon Army; banker and planter.

== P ==
- Theodore Braybrooke Panabokke (1909–1989) – Member of Parliament and high commissioner to India.v
- Tikiri Bandara Panabokke II (1883–1963) – Cabinet minister and member of the Legislative Council of Ceylon.
- Matheesha Pathirana (born 2002) – national cricketer.
- Sachith Pathirana (born 1989) – national cricketer.
- David Paynter (1900–1975) – artist and painter.
- R. S. Pelpola (1898–1971) – 7th Speaker of the Parliament of Ceylon (1960–1964) and high commissioner to Malaysia.
- T. B. Poholiyadde (1890–1956) – Member of Parliament and colonial-era headman.

== R ==
- P. T. R. Palanivel Rajan (1932–2006) – 9th Speaker of the Tamil Nadu Legislative Assembly (1996–2001) and minister.
- Tellipalai Rajaratnam (1920–1994) – Puisne justice of the Supreme Court of Sri Lanka, commissioner of assize and member of Parliament.
- Rudra Rajasingham (1926–2006) – 20th Inspector General of Police (1982–1985) and ambassador to Indonesia.
- J. A. Rambukpota (1891–1955) – Member of Parliament and colonial-era administrator.
- Shelton Ranaraja (1926–2011) – Deputy minister and mayor of Kandy.
- Roshanka Ranasinghe (born 1967) – University professor and coastal engineer.
- Donald Jasen Ranaweera (1921–2000) – Member of Parliament, plantation owner and chairman of The Times of Ceylon.
- Shanakiya Rasamanickam (born 1990) – Member of Parliament.
- David Ratnavale (1928–2023) – psychiatrist and advocate of disaster relief.
- Nilantha Ratnayake (born 1968) – national cricketer.
- Ravi Ratnayeke (born 1960) – vice captain of the Sri Lanka national cricket team.
- A. C. L. Ratwatte (1909–1971) – Mayor of Kandy, high commissioner to Ghana and Malaysia; son of Cudah Ratwatte and brother of J. C. Ratwatte II.
- Anuruddha Ratwatte (1938–2011) – General, Sri Lanka Army; Cabinet minister.
- Barnes Ratwatte (1883–1957) – Member of both the State Council and the Senate of Ceylon; father of Sirimavo Bandaranaike.
- Barnes Ratwatte II (c. 1918–2004) – Puisne justice of the Supreme Court of Sri Lanka and public trustee.
- Cudah Ratwatte (1880–1940) – first Mayor of Kandy and the first person from Kandy to be awarded a knighthood; father of A. C. L. Ratwatte and J. C. Ratwatte II.
- J. C. Ratwatte II – Member of the State Council of Ceylon and Adigar; son of Cudah Ratwatte and brother of A. C. L. Ratwatte.
- Lohan Ratwatte (1968–2025) – Non-cabinet minister, MP (2010–2024).
- Mackie Ratwatte (c. 1922–1999) – physician and private secretary to the prime minister.
- Mahendra Ratwatte – Mayor of Kandy (2011-2015), basnayake nilame of Sri Maha Vishnu Devalaya of Kandy and Dedi Munda Devalaya of Aluthnuwara.
- Nigel Ratwatte (born 1990), captain of the Sri Lanka national rugby union team.
- S. D. Ratwatte – Colonel, Ceylon Army; Commandant of the Volunteer Force and veteran of World War II.
- Tharinda Ratwatte (born 1995) – rugby union player.
- Wilfred A. Ratwatte – Member of Parliament.
- Joseph Lionel Christie Rodrigo (1895–1972) – university professor and dean of the faculty of arts of the University of Ceylon.
- Ajit Rudra (1896–1993) – Major general, Indian Army; General officer commanding Southern Command; veteran of World War I and World War II.

== S ==
- Neville Samarakoon (1919–1990) – 36th Chief Justice of Sri Lanka (1977–1984).
- Kumar Sangakkara (born 1977) – captain of the Sri Lanka national cricket team.
- Vernon Schokman (1905–1991) – first-class cricketer, rugby union player and police officer.
- E. L. Senanayake (1920–2000) – 13th Speaker of the Parliament of Sri Lanka (1983–1988); father of Kesera Senanayake.
- Kesera Senanayake – Mayor of Kandy.
- Sujeewa Senasinghe (born 1971) – Non-cabinet minister.
- Berty Seneviratne (1916–1967) – actor, filmmaker and choreographer.
- Partap Sharma (1939–2011) – author, novelist, playwright, commentator, actor and documentary filmmaker.
- Sarath N. Silva (born 1946) – 41st Chief Justice of Sri Lanka (1999–2009).
- Travis Sinniah – Admiral, Sri Lanka Navy; 21st Commander of the Navy (2017).
- Peri Sundaram (1890–1957) – Minister of the State Council of Ceylon, member of the Senate of Ceylon, lawyer and trade unionist.

== T ==
- Herbert Tennekoon (1911–1979) – 6th Governor of the Central Bank (1971–1979) and civil servant; brother of William Tennekoon.
- R. S. Tennekoon – Member of both the first and second State Councils of Ceylon.
- William Tennekoon – 5th Governor of the Central Bank (1967–1971) and civil servant.
- Duvindu Tillakaratne (born 1996) – first-class cricketer.

== U ==
- Richard Udugama (1911–1995), Major general, Ceylon Army; 5th Commander of the Army (1964–1966), Member of Parliament and ambassador to Iraq.
- Heshan Unamboowe (born 1992) – Olympic swimmer, men's 100 metre backstroke at the 2012 Summer Olympics.
- Ukku Banda Unamboowe – Member of Parliament and colonial-era administrator.

== V ==
- Amith Thenuka Vidanagamage (born 1973) – Cabinet minister.
- Tissa Vitharana (1934–2026) – Cabinet minister and the leader of Lanka Sama Samaja Party (LSSP).

== W ==
- Batty Weerakoon (1932–2019) – Cabinet minister and the leader of Lanka Sama Samaja Party (LSSP).
- Kaushalya Weeraratne (born 1981) – national cricketer.
- Arnolis Weerasooriya (1854–1888) – first Ceylonese colonel of the Salvation Army.
- T. B. Werapitiya (1924–1996) – Non-cabinet minister, school teacher, police officer and first-class cricketer.
- Duncan White (1918–1998) – Olympic athlete and silver medallist in the men's 400 metres hurdles at the 1948 Summer Olympics; first Ceylonese to win an Olympic medal.
- Leonard Merlyn Wickramasuriya (1916–2002) – Brigadier, Ceylon Army; first commandant of the Army Training Centre (1964–1968) and veteran of World War II.
- Kanchana Wijesekera (born 1982) – Cabinet minister.
- Sean Wijesinghe – rugby union player and coach.
- Stanley Wijesundera (1923–1989) – Professor of biochemistry and 1st Vice-chancellor of the University of Colombo (1978–1988).

== Notes ==
Sources

- "Centenary Number, Trinity College, Kandy, 1872–1972" (PDF). noolaham.net. 17 March 1972. Archived from the original (PDF) on 8 August 2024.
- "The Trinity Story 1872–2022". history.trinitycollege.lk. 12 February 2024. Archived from the original on 13 May 2025.
