= Ratwatte =

Ratwatte (Sinhala: රත්වත්ත, romanized: Ratvatta) is a Sinhalese surname. Notable people with the surname include:

- Anuruddha Ratwatte (1938–2011), Sri Lankan soldier and politician
- Barnes Ratwatte (1883–1957), Ceylonese colonial-era legislator and a headman
- Barnes Ratwatte II (1918–2004), Sri Lankan lawyer and judge
- Charitha Ratwatte III (born 1948), Sri Lankan lawyer and bureaucrat
- Clifford Ratwatte (1927–2009), Sri Lankan politician
- Cuda Ratwatte, Ceylonese, the first elected mayor of Kandy, awarded a knighthood from the British, appointed Adigar
- Harris Leuke Ratwatte (1900–1964), Ceylonese legislator
- J. C. Ratwatte II, Ceylonese legislator
- Lohan Ratwatte (1968–2025), Member of Parliament representing the Kandy District in Sri Lanka
- Mackie Ratwatte, Sri Lankan physician
- Mahendra Ratwatte, Sri Lankan politician and Mayor of Kandy from 2011 to 2015
- Nigel Ratwatte (born 1990), Sri Lankan rugby union player
- Ratwatte Nilame (died 1827) courtier of the Kingdom of Kandy
- Sirimavo Ratwatte Dias Bandaranaike (1916–2000), Sri Lankan stateswoman
- Tharinda Ratwatte (born 1995), Sri Lankan rugby union player
- Wilfred A. Ratwatte, Ceylonese politician

== See also ==
- Ratte (disambiguation)
- Rawat (disambiguation)
- Twatt (disambiguation)
