= Allan Morley Spaar =

Allan Morley Spaar MBE JP

Mayor of Kandy
- In office 1940–1942

Personal details
- Born: 23 January 1876 Colombo, Ceylon
- Died: 5 June 1960 (aged 84)
- Spouse: Ethel Jardine
- Children: Mary Ethel Helen; Claribel Nellie; Florence Marion Lorna

Allan Morley Spaar (23 January 1876 – 5 June 1960) was a Ceylonese public servant and local politician, serving as the second Mayor of Kandy between 1940 and 1942.

Allan Morley Spaar was born in Colombo, Ceylon on 23 January 1876, the fourth son of Reverend James Alfred Spaar, a Minister of the Wesleyan Mission, and Clara Jane née van der Straaten. His eldest brother, Alfred Eaton (b. 1871), a doctor was awarded an OBE in 1950 for his medical contributions to the community. He attended Kingswood College, Kandy and in later years assisted the school, in drawing plans for a number of buildings and auditing the school's accounts.

Spaar married Mary Ethel Jardine on 3 May 1899. They had three daughters: Mary Ethel Helen (1 April 1900); Claribel Nellie (1 February 1902); and Florence Marion Lorna (23 June 1904).

In the 1930s he served as the Superintendent of Minor Roads, Kandy, having worked earlier as the superintendent of works in Ambawela and Dambulla. Spaar was appointed as a Member of the Order of the British Empire in the 1938 Birthday Honours, for his services as a relief services worker. In 1939 he was elected to the first Kandy Municipal Council and on 4 April 1940, following the death of Sir Jayatilaka Cudah Ratwatte, he was elected as the Council's second mayor. In April 1953 he was the first elected president of the Kandy Friend in Need Society, a non for profit organisation established to care for the elderly in Kandy. Spaar died on 5 June 1960, at the age of 84.
