= Naganather Canaganayagam =

Ceylonese political activist

Gate Mudaliyar Naganather Canaganayagam, CBE, JP, FREconS (27 May 1892 - 1 January 1967) was a Ceylonese banker, planter and local politician, who served as the first Tamil Mayor of Kandy in 1942.

Suriyakumara Nichinga Senathiraja Ambalavaner Naganather Thandigai Canaganayagam was born on 27 May 1892 in Kopay, Jaffna, the son of Atikar Ambalavaner Naganather CBE JP, UM (1850-1953), a banker and rubber plantation owner, and Sethuppillai Ampalavanar. Canaganayagam attended Saint Joseph's College, Colombo, where he won prizes for Latin, French and Physics. He then attended the Ceylon Medical School leaving in his second year to become a banker. In 1912 he was appointed the head shroff of the National Bank of India in Nuwara Eliya, succeeding his father. Canaganayayagam passed the associate examination of the Institute of Bankers in 1925, and was made a Fellow of the Royal Economic Society. Later that year he was transferred to the bank's branch in Kandy, where he remained until he retired.

In 1939 he was elected to the first Kandy Municipal Council, representing Ward #9 (Wevelpitiya), remaining on the council until 1945. He served as both as the deputy mayor in 1941 and the mayor in 1942, becoming the first Tamil mayor of the council. He was an actively involved in a number of local religious and social organisations in Kandy. Canaganayagam was awarded the titular honor of Gate Mudliyar by the British Government of Ceylon, and appointed an Officer of the Order of the British Empire in the 1951 New Year Honours. In the 1955 Queen's Birthday Honours Canaganayagam was made a Commander of the British Empire for his public services. He was a member of the Planters' Association, Low Country Planters' Association and the Kandy National Museum Advisory Committee.

He died on 1 January 1967 at the age of 74. In May 1992 he was commemorated as a National Hero through the issue of a Rs. 100 postage stamp with his portrait. The University of Peradeniya's Department of Economics and Statistics issues an annual prize in economics in his name.
