= Tharinda Ratwatte =

Sri Lankan rugby sevens player (born 1995)

Tarinda Ratwatte
- Born: 12 December 1995 (age 30)
- School: Trinity College, Kandy
- University: University of London; Sri Lanka Law College
- Occupation: Attorney-at-law

Rugby union career
- Position: fly-half
- Current team: Kandy Sports Club
Senior career
Years	Team	Apps	(Points)
2014-2018	Ceylonese RFC		
2019-present	Kandy SC		
International career
Years	Team	Apps	(Points)
- Sri Lanka
National sevens team
Years	Team		Comps
- Sri Lanka

Ashan Tarinda Ratwatte (born 12 December 1995), commonly known as Tari, is a Sri Lankan rugby union and sevens player. He plays as a fly-half for Kandy Sports Club and the Sri Lanka national rugby team. Ratwatte is the son of former rugby player Ashan Ratwatte, who played for both Kandy SC and Ceylonese Rugby & Football Club.

== Early life and education ==
Ratwatte was born in 1995 to Ashan Ratwatte, a well-known rugby player who represented Kandy Sports Club and Ceylonese Rugby & Football Club. His great-uncle, Anuruddha Ratwatte, was a former Sri Lankan Army General and Deputy Minister of Defense. His uncles, Lohan Ratwatte, a former State Minister, and Mahendra Ratwatte, a former Mayor of Kandy, are also notable figures in Sri Lankan politics.

He was educated at the British School in Kandy before enrolling at Trinity College Kandy in 2006. At Trinity, Ratwatte captained the school’s 2014 rugby team as fly-half. His achievements in rugby earned him the prestigious Trinity Lion for Rugby, and he was also awarded the Ryde Gold Medal for being the Best All-Round Boy. He served as Senior Prefect (Head Boy) in 2014.

Ratwatte went on to study law at the University of London and completed his legal training at the Sri Lanka Law College. He is currently an attorney-at-law.

== Career ==
Ratwatte captained Trinity College rugby team in 2014. Soon after schooling, he joined Ceylonese Rugby & Football Club. In 2014, he was appointed as the captain of the Sri Lankan Youth rugby team for the Junior World Rugby Tournament (JWRT) – Asian edition.

He was named in Sri Lankan men's rugby sevens squads for both the 2018 Commonwealth Games and 2018 Asian Games. Sri Lanka would eventually finish at fourth position in men's rugby sevens tournament during the 2018 Asian Games thereby narrowly missing out on a bronze medal after going down 36-14 to South Korea in bronze medal 3rd place match while Sri Lanka finished at fifteenth position in men's rugby sevens tournament at the 2018 Commonwealth Games.

Ratwatte joined Kandy SC in 2019 after playing for Ceylonese Rugby and Football Club for four years. He was the top points scorer in the Dialog Rugby League 2019/20 with 123 points including 3 tries and 42 conversion points.

He was included in 110 member Sri Lankan contingent for the 2022 Commonwealth Games. He scored a try against New Zealand during the opening game of the 2022 Commonwealth Games men's rugby tournament. It was the first try to be scored by Sri Lanka against New Zealand in rugby sevens at Commonwealth Games and Ashan also became only the second Sri Lankan after Sudath Sampath to score a try against New Zealand in any forms of rugby.

== Arrest ==
In June 2020, Ratwatte was arrested and remanded in connection with a road accident that resulted in the death of a police officer attached to the State Intelligence Service (SIS). The accident occurred on the night of June 11, 2020, near the Thumulla junction, when the Defender he was traveling in collided with a motorcycle carrying two SIS officers.

The deceased officer was identified as 22-year-old PC Sithum Alahapperuma, who, along with the other injured officer, had recently foiled a robbery at the National Hospital. Hospital sources reported that the other officer suffered serious injuries to his legs.

Following the accident, a police investigation found that Ratwatte, who was 24 years old at the time, was intoxicated beyond the legal limit. He was subsequently arrested and remanded. When the case was taken up in Colombo, Ratwatte was not presented in court. Instead, he was reportedly warded at Dumbara Hospital under the protection of prison officials. The court ordered him to be presented at a later date and extended his remand until June 19.
