= Ambalavaner Naganather =

Ceylonese colonial-era banker and rubber plantation owner

Atikar Suriyacumara Nitchinga Senathiraja Ambalavaner Naganather, CBE, JP, UM (1850-1953) was a prominent Ceylonese colonial-era banker and rubber plantation owner.

Born in Jaffna, Ambalavaner Naganather joined the Oriental Banking Corporation of Nuwara Eliya as a bank clerk and in 1870 became head shroff. He went on to establish the National Bank of India, Nuwara Eliya in 1892 as its founder guarantee shroff and later established the National Bank of India, Kandy.

In 1936 he was awarded the titular honor of Atikar.

He was appointed a Commander of the Most Excellent Order of the British Empire (CBE) in the 1950 Birthday Honours for his philanthropic activities in the northern province.

His son, Naganather Canaganayagam, was elected as the third Mayor of Kandy in 1942.
