= Harindra Dunuwille =

Sri Lankan lawyer and politician

Hon. Harindra Dunuwille

Mayor of Kandy
- In office 1997–2002
- Preceded by: Don Edmund Pathirane
- Succeeded by: Kesera Senanayake

Member of Parliament for Kandy District
- In office 1989–1994

Personal details
- Born: Tikiribanda Harindranatha Dunuwille; 29 September 1946
- Party: United National Party
- Relations: B. H. Dunuwille (father)
- Education: Trinity College, Kandy, Ceylon Law College
- Profession: Lawyer

Tikiribanda Harindranatha "Harindra" Dunuwille (born 29 September 1946) is a Sri Lankan lawyer and politician. He was a former member of parliament (1989–1994), former Deputy Minister of State for Constitutional Affairs (1989–93), and Mayor of Kandy (1997–2002).

Born to a prominent family in Kandy, Dunuwille was educated at Trinity College, Kandy and Ceylon Law College. A keen sportsmen he won the coveted Trinity Lion in 1966 and was also the president of the Students Union at the Ceylon Law College.

Starting a successful legal practice in Kandy, he went on to become the president of the Kandy Bar Association and the vice-president of the Bar Association of Sri Lanka.

He entered politics in the 1980s and was elected to the Kandy Municipal Council and served as the mayor of Kandy for two consecutive terms. From 1989 to 1994 he was a Member of Parliament and served as the Deputy Minister of State for Constitutional Affairs.

He is a cousin of the actress Iranganie Serasinghe.
