= SARAF =

Saraf may refer to:

== People ==
- Ashok Saraf (born 1947), Indian film actor
- Ben Saraf (born 2006), Israeli basketball player
- Devita Saraf (born 1981), Indian businesswoman
- Irving Saraf (1932–2012), Polish-born American film producer-director
- Kali Charan Saraf (born 1951), Indian politician
- Mulk Raj Saraf (1894–1989), Indian writer
- Nivedita Saraf (born 1963), Indian film actress
- Peter Saraf (born 1965), American film producer
- Ram Piara Saraf (1924–2009), Indian politician
- Rohit Saraf (born 1996), Indian actor
- Shirish Saraf (born 1967), Indian businessman
- Shubham Saraf (born 1992), British-Indian actor

== Other uses ==
- Saraf (Sanaa), a sub-district of Bani Hushaysh District, Sana'a Governorate, Yemen
- Saraf Hospital, in Kochi in Kerala, India
- Soreq Applied Research Accelerator Facility, a particle accelerator facility in Israel
- South Armagh Republican Action Force, an alleged Irish republican paramilitary group
- Store-operated calcium entry-associated regulatory factor, encoded by the SARAF gene

== See also ==
- Shroff
