= A. C. L. Ratwatte =

Ceylonese politician

Abeyratne Cudah Leonard Ratwatte, MBE (29 January 1909 – 11 July 1971) was a Ceylonese politician. He was the Mayor of Kandy, Ceylon's High Commissioner in Ghana and Ceylon's High Commissioner to Malaysia.

Abeyratne Cudah Leonard Ratwatte was born on 29 January 1909 the son of Sir Cudah Ratwatte and Chitravo Katugaha née Kumarihamy. He was the eldest in a family of six boys and four girls, including Stanley and Jayampathy Charitha. He was a cousin of Sirimavo Ratwatte Dias Bandaranaike. Educated at Trinity College, Kandy where he won colours for rugby, he joined the Mercantile Bank of Kandy and served as Deputy Shroff, when his father was the Shroff of the bank. He later succeeded his father as Shroff of the Mercantile Bank of Kandy and served as a Director of the Insurance Corporation.

Entering local politics, Ratwatte was elected to the Kandy Municipal Council and went on to serve as the Deputy Mayor on three occasions. In the municipal elections of 1947, he was elected Mayor of Kandy. He had been a municipal councillor for 27 years. He contested the by-election for Kandy electorate in 1949 and was defeated by Tamara Kumari Illangaratne. He was a senior member of the United National Party served in its Working Committee and was the President of the UNP's Youth League in Kandy. He was appointed first citizen to aid Lord Mountbatten during his time in Kandy and was appointed a Member of the Order of the British Empire (MBE) in the 1951 Birthday Honours.

In 1965, Prime Minister Dudley Senanayake appointed him as Ceylon's High Commissioner in Ghana and thereafter Ceylon's High Commissioner to Malaysia. He was the President of the Kandy District Cricket Association and the President of the Kandy District Football Association.

He was married to Chandra Divitotawela Ratwatte and they had two daughters Lilamanie and Areenie. He died on 11 July 1971, after a brief illness.

== See also ==
- List of political families in Sri Lanka
