= Harris Leuke Ratwatte =

Ceylonese legislator

Hon. Harris Leuke Ratwatte
- Ratwatte in the regalia of Diyawadana Nilame of the Dalada Maligawa

15th Diyawadana Nilame of the Temple of the Sacred Tooth Relic
- In office 1961–1964
- Preceded by: Kuda Banda Nugawela
- Succeeded by: Heen Banda Udurawana

Member of the State Council for Kegalle
- In office 1936–1947

Member of the Sri Lankan Parliament for Mawanella
- In office 1947–1952

Member of Senate
- In office 1955–19**

Personal details
- Born: 1900
- Died: 1964 (aged 63–64)
- Party: United National Party
- Spouse(s): Mallika Ratwatte (née Katugaha)
- Children: Ryan, Ivy, Dennis, Chintha, Preeni, Anuruddha, Ranji, Samudhra & Mangalika

Wijewardena Seneviratne Panditha Abeykoon Bandaranayake Wahala Mudiyanselage Harris Leuke Ratwatte (Sinhala: විජේවර්ධන සෙනෙවිරත්න පණ්ඩිත අබේකෝන් බණ්ඩාරනායක වාහල මුදියන්සේලාගේ හැරිස් ලියුකේ රත්වත්තේ) (known as Harris Leuke Ratwatte) MBE (1900–1964) was a Ceylonese legislator. He was a member of the State Council of Ceylon, Parliament and the Senate of Ceylon. Ratwatte was award the title of Dissawa by the British Governor of Ceylon and was elected as the Diyawadana Nilame of Sri Dalada Maligawa, Kandy.

Born to Abeyratne Banda Ratwatte and Thalgahagoda Lewke Punchi Kumarihamy, his brothers were Sir Cuda Ratwatte Adigar former mayor of Kandy and Barnes Ratwatte Dissawa who was also a member of the State Council.

In 1933 he became the Basnayake Nilame of the Kataragama Devale of Kandy and the Maha Vishnu Devale of Kandy. He was elected to the State Council in 1936 from Kegalle and held the seat until 1947. From 1940 to 1942 he was a member of the Kandy Municipal Council. In 1948 he was elected to the House of Representatives from Mawanella and held the seat until 1952. In 1955 he was elected to the Senate. He was elected to the post of Diyawadana Nilame of the Sri Dalada Maligawa in 1961 and held the post until his death in 1964.

Harris Leuke Ratwatte married Mallika Katugaha Kumarihamy, daughter of Katugaha Bandaranayake Herath Mudiyanse Punchi Bandara, acting Rate Mahatmaya of Yatikinda. Harris Ratwatte and his Kumarihamy had nine children: Ryan, Ivy, Dennis, Chintha, Preeni, Anuruddha, Ranji, Samudhra & Mangalika. His son General Anuruddha Ratwatte was a Cabinet Minister. His grandson Lohan is the Member of Parliament representing the Kandy District and another grandson, Mahendra was a former mayor of Kandy.

== See also ==
- Diyawadana Nilame, Sri Dalada Maligawa, Kandy
- List of political families in Sri Lanka
