= Ratte =

Ratte can refer to:

- Landkreuzer P. 1000 Ratte, a prototype heavy German war tank designed during World War II
- Ratte potato, a variety of potato from France
- Ratte, Saône-et-Loire, France
- Étienne-Hyacinthe de Ratte (1722–1805), French astronomer and mathematician
