= Kandy Town Hall =

Building in Kandy, Sri Lanka

Town Hall
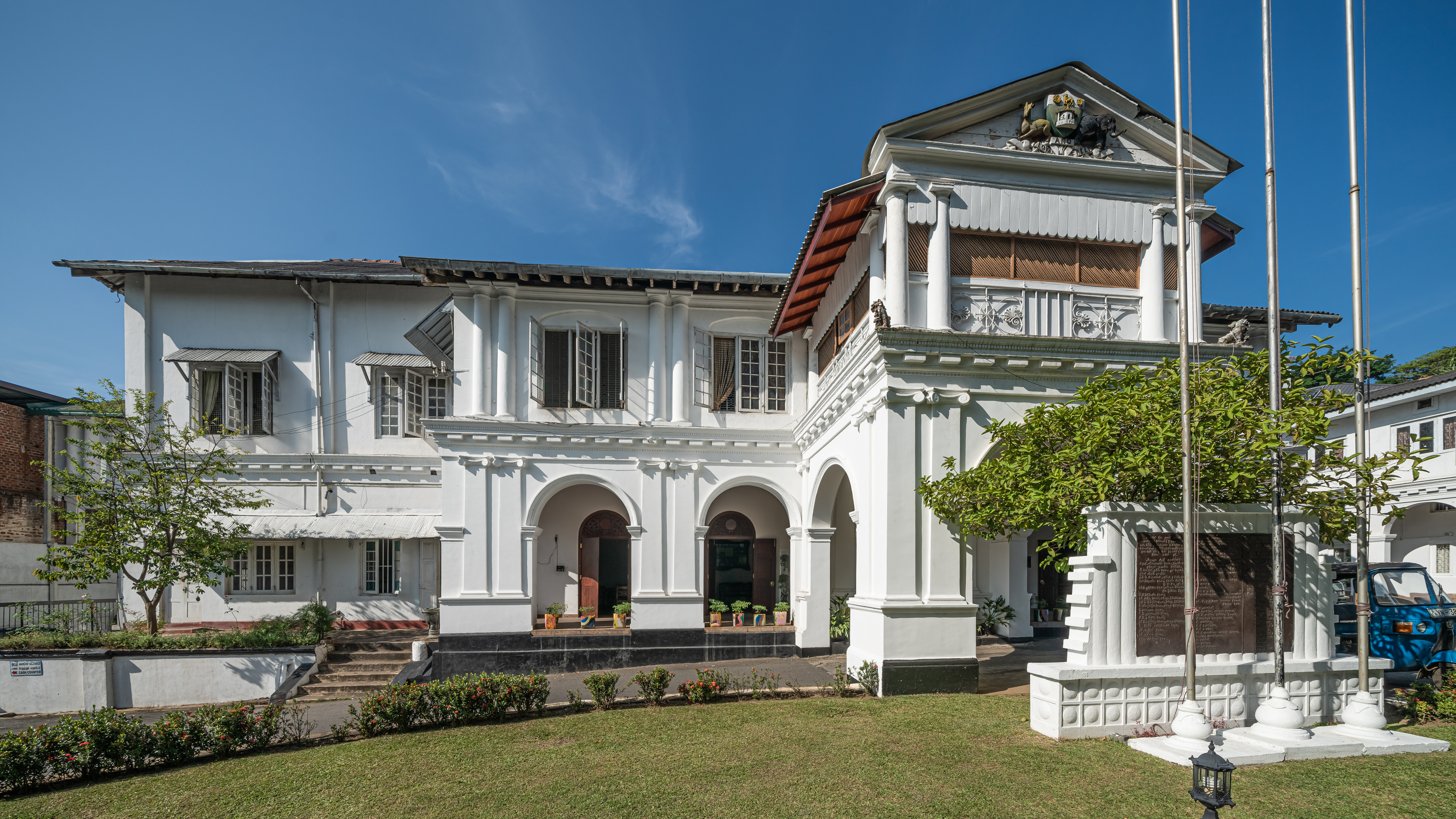
- Kandy Town Hall

- Location within Sri Lanka

General information
- Location: Kandy, Sri Lanka
- Coordinates: 7°17′56″N 80°38′15″E
- Construction started: 18??
- Client: Kandy Municipal Council

Archaeological Protected Monument of Sri Lanka
- Designated: 8 July 2005

The Town Hall of Kandy is the headquarters of the Kandy Municipal Council and the office of the Mayor of Kandy.

The building known as the Dunuwille Walawwe was acquired by the Municipal Council in 1870 at a court sanctioned auction, conducted to settle the “Death Duty” (Estate Tax) on the estate of Deputy Queen's Advocate, James Alexander Dunuwille (1821–1866). The building was purchased for approximately £480. It was initially used as the city's Town Hall. It currently houses the council's administrative staff.
