= Mahamaya Girls' College, Kandy =

Public school in Kandy, Sri Lanka

Mahamaya Girls' College
- මහාමායා බාලිකා විද්‍යාලය

Location
- Sangharaja Mawatha; Kandy, Central Province; Sri Lanka; 7°17′12″N 80°38′40″E

Information
- Former name: Buddhist Girls' College
- School type: National school
- Motto: විජ්ජා උප්‍පත්‍තං සෙට්ඨා (Knowledge is supreme)
- Religious affiliation: Buddhist
- Established: 14 January 1932; 94 years ago
- Founders: Anagarika Dharmapala; Chitravo Ratwatte; Sarah Soysa
- School code: 03351
- Principal: Sashikala Senadheera
- Faculty: 200
- Grades: 1–13
- Gender: Girls
- Age range: 6–19
- Enrollment: 4,000+
- Education system: National Education System
- Language: Sinhala, English
- Hours in school day: 07:30–13:30
- Colours: Blue and gold
- Song: නමඳිමු නමඳිමු බැති පෙම් දල්වා
- Affiliation: Ministry of Education
- Alumni: Mayans
- Website: mahamayagirlscollege.lk

Mahamaya Girls’ College is a public girls' school in Kandy, Sri Lanka. Located in the centre of Kandy, overlooking the Kandy Lake, the school is named after Queen Mahamaya, the mother of Prince Siddhartha, the Buddha.

== History ==
Mahamaya Girls’ College Kandy was founded on 14 January 1932 by the Sadhachara Kulangana Samithiya led by Lady Sarah Soysa and Chitravo Ratwatte. The first classroom was in the West Cliffe Bungalow which was bought from Anagarika Dharmapala together with 1 hectare (2.5 acres) of land adjoining the property which belonged to Arthur Fernando. National leaders like Anagarika Dharmapala, D. B. Jayatilaka, P. de S. Kularatne, G. P. Malalasekera and C. W. W. Kannangara contributed to the college.

=== Chronology of notable events ===
- 14 January 1932 – Mahamaya Girls' College founded as "Buddhist Girls' College", with sixteen registered students and three teachers.
- 1938 – renamed as Mahamaya Girls' College.
- December 1960 – Mahamaya taken over for State Administration.
- 1982 – Mahamaya received the National School status.
- 1990 – auditorium completed.
- 2000 – swimming pool completed.

== Principals ==
- Hilda Kularathne (1932)
- A. Bangaru (1933–1937) (acting)
- Bertha Irene Ratwatte (née Rogers) (1937–1949)
- C. Nanayakkara / S. Wijesundara (1949–1951) (acting)
- Soma Gunawardene (1951–1972)
- Lalitha Abeysinghe Fernando (1972–1980)
- Dorathi Perera (1980–1981)
- Navarathne Kumari Pilapitiya (also known as Nita Pilapitiya) (1981–1990)
- Muriel Subasinghe (1990–1995)
- R. W. Indra Kumari Rathnayake (1995–2000)
- W. M. Bandaramenike Wijesinghe (2000–2005)
- I. Withanaarachchi (2005–2017)
- Himali Senadheera (2018–2020) (acting)
- Lalitha Egodawela (2020)
- Dulani Samarakoon (2020–2021) (acting)
- Sashikala Senadheera (2021–present)

== College today ==
There are around 4500 students, 185 female teachers and 15 male teachers by the year 2000. Therevada Buddhism is an integral part of the school's education system, as it is in all Sri Lankan Buddhist public schools. Students are divided among four houses. The housing system is primarily used for sporting events and house debates.

== Education ==
Mahamaya Girls' College is divided into a primary section and a secondary school section. The primary school which consists of grades 1 through 5 is located near the secondary school. The primary school looks over the Kandy Lake. The secondary school consists of grades 6 through 13. Each grade has seven classes, and each class consists of around forty students.

The school has facilities for science, commerce, mathematics, languages and biology A/L schemes. It produces nationally high-ranking students, evidenced by the all-island positions received by students who sit for the national Ordinary Level and Advanced Level examinations. It has been ranked in the top three over the years among all the girls' schools in Sri Lanka in the preference rankings based on year 5 scholarship examinees' demand.

== Sports and extracurricular activities ==
The school has a number of nationally ranking student-athletes, who are involved in sports ranging from track and field to swimming. In addition to partaking in many national sporting events, the school holds an annual sports-meet, which is an intra-school competition.

The school has a Western music band, an Eastern music band, a Western music choir and a traditional Sri Lankan dance team. The award-winning Literary, Music and Drama Society of the school takes part in national drama competitions. The first Observational Astronomy Competition in South Asia was organised by the Anandian Astronomical Association of Ananda College, Colombo together with the Astronomical Society of Mahamaya Girls’ College.

== Flag ==
The school flag, crest and the school song in Sinhala were introduced during the tenure of Soma Pujitha Gunewardena. The first school song in English was introduced by Bertha Rogers Ratwatte.

== Houses ==
The students are divided into four Houses:

- – Sangamiththa
- – Maya
- – Yasodhara
- – Prajapathi

The house names are derived from Buddhist history. The houses compete in inter-house games and competitions as well as the college sports-meet held in January every year.

== Notable alumnae ==
| Name | Notability | Reference |
|---|---|---|
| Nadeeka Gunasekara | Actress | |
| Thilini Jayasinghe | Badminton player, Olympic representative | |

== See also ==
- Education in Sri Lanka
- List of schools in Central Province
