= E. L. Senanayake =

Sri Lankan politician

Hon. Deshamanya Edward Lionel Senanayaka
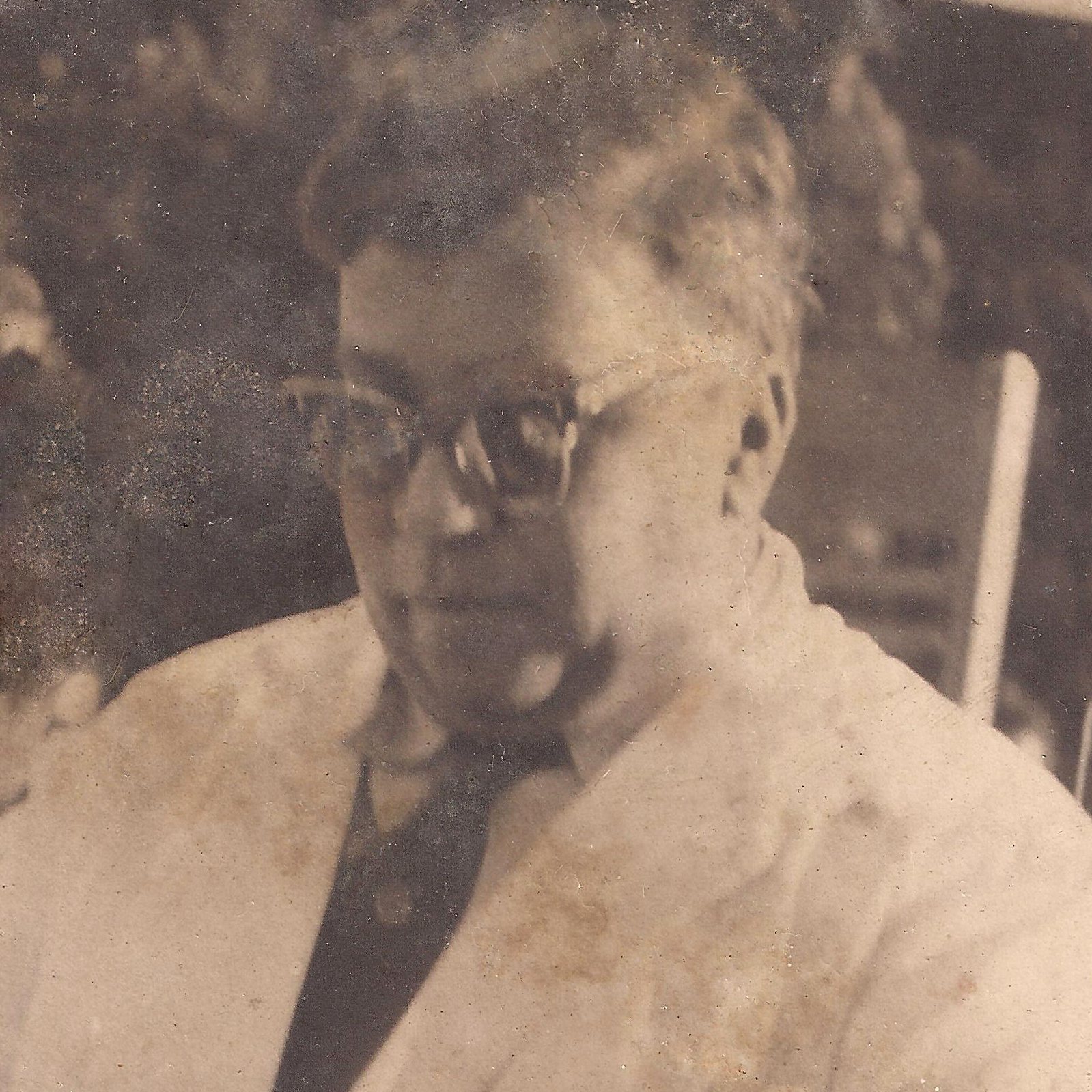

13th Speaker of the Parliament
- In office 6 September 1983 – 20 December 1988
- President: J. R. Jayewardene
- Prime Minister: Ranasinghe Premadasa
- Preceded by: Bakeer Markar
- Succeeded by: M. H. Mohamed

Mayor of Kandy
- In office 1964–1968
- Preceded by: Noel Wimalasena
- Succeeded by: Bennet Soysa
- In office 1956–1960
- Preceded by: Bennet Soysa
- Succeeded by: Bennet Soysa
- In office 1950–1954
- Preceded by: Bennet Soysa
- Succeeded by: Bennet Soysa

Personal details
- Born: 8 August 1920
- Died: 29 January 2000 (aged 79)
- Party: United National Party
- Education: Trinity College, Kandy; Ceylon University College

Deshamanya Edward Lionel Senanayake (known commonly as E.L Senanayake) (8 August 1920 – 29 January 2000) was a Sri Lankan politician belonging to the United National Party. He was the 12th Speaker of the Sri Lankan Parliament. Senanayake was the Governor of North Central Province and Central Province of Sri Lanka. He was elected to the Sri Lankan Parliament from Mahanuwara in Kandy.

He was the son of Gate Mudaliyar James Senanayake and was educated at Trinity College, Kandy and at the University College, Colombo graduating with an honours degree in Economics. Having entered politics at the age of 23 after being elected to the Kandy Municipal Council, he went on to serve as Mayor before being elected to Parliament.

== Early life and education ==
Born at Milton House, Castle Street, Kandy to Wasala Mudaliyar James Senanayake; he was educated at Trinity College, Kandy and at the University College, Colombo graduating with an honours degree in economics.

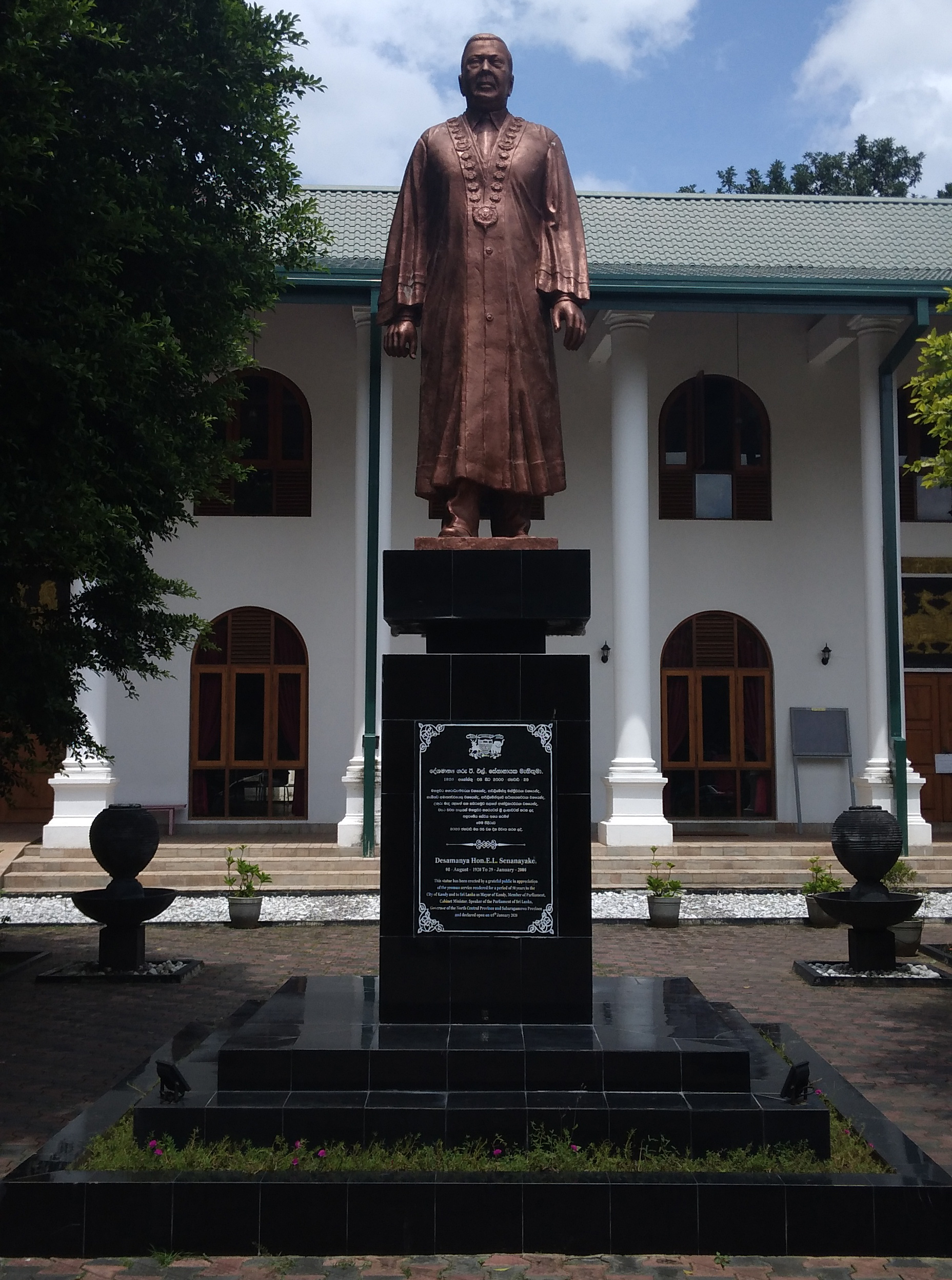
E. L. Senanayake Statue at Kandy.

== Political career ==
He was elected to the Kandy Municipal Council in 1943. In 1946 he was elected as the Deputy Mayor of Kandy and was elected Mayor of Kandy in 1950 as the country's youngest mayor. During his tenure the new Kandy Central Market was constructed, the Kandy water supply scheme at Getambe, the D.S. Senanayake Public Library, the E.L. Senanayake Children's Library, the Auditorium and the E. L. Senanayake Children's Park at Ampitiya.

He was elected to parliament from the 1953 general election from the United National Party. He lost his seat in the 1956 general election, but was re-elected in the March 1960 general election and retained his seat in the next consecutive elections and remained member of parliament till 1988. He served as Health Minister and Minister of Agriculture and Lands, before being elected Speaker of the Parliament. Following his retirement politics he was appointed Governor of the North Central Province and thereafter Governor of Sabaragamuwa. He was awarded the title of Deshamanya by the President of Sri Lanka.

== Family ==
His brother Dr James Senanayake was a member of the Senate of Ceylon and his younger brother Earnest Senanayake served as a Member of the Kandy Municipal Council. He was married to Seetha Senanayake, who served as his private secretary. Two of their sons Dhathusena and Rajasinghe served as Members of the Kandy Municipal Council, while another son Kesera served as a diplomat and was a member of the Central Provincial Council. His family donated the Miltion Senanayake Memorial Library at Trinity College Kandy, a ward at the Mahaiyawa Home for Elders, contributions towards the Pothgul Viharaya at Malabar Street Kandy and the YMCA building at Sangaraja Mawatha Kandy.

Political offices
Preceded by P. C. Imbulana	Governor of Central Province; 1994–1998	Succeeded by Stanley Tillekeratne
Preceded by Dingiri Bandara Welagedara	Governor of North Central Province; 1989–1994	Succeeded by E. L. B. Hurulle
