= Roshanka Ranasinghe =

Sri Lankan coastal engineer (born 1967)

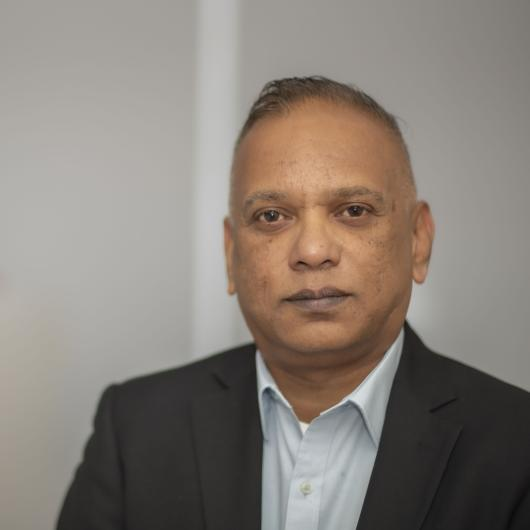
- Ranasinghe at the IHE Delft Institute for Water Education
- Born: 1967 (age 58–59); Kandy, Sri Lanka

Academic background
- Education: Trinity College Kandy, University of Peradeniya, University of Western Australia
- Thesis: Dynamics of Seasonally Open Tidal Inlets (1995)

Academic work
- Discipline: Climate change, Coastal risk assessment, Coastal zone management, Numerical modelling of coastal hazards, Coastal Engineerings
- Institutions: IHE Delft Institute for Water Education, University of Twente, Deltares

Roshanka Ranasinghe (born 1967 in Kandy, Sri Lanka) is a coastal engineering professor in the Netherlands. He holds the AXA Chair in Climate Change Impacts and Coastal Risk at the Department of Coastal and Urban Risk and Resilience, IHE Delft Institute for Water Education. He is also a professor at the Department of Water Engineering and Management, University of Twente and a senior specialist at the Department of Resilient Ports and Coasts (Hydraulic Engineering Unit) at Deltares.

== Biography ==
=== Education and career ===
Roshanka Ranasinghe was educated at Trinity College, Kandy in Sri Lanka. He qualified in Civil Engineering in 1993 at the University of Peradeniya, Sri Lanka, with First Class Honours. In 1998, Ranasinghe received his doctorate in Coastal Engineering and Oceanography at the Centre for Water Research (CWR), University of Western Australia (Perth, Australia) with his thesis "Dynamics of Seasonally Open Tidal Inlets".

He has worked in both the academic and government sectors in Australia and the Netherlands, and has authored over 200 peer-reviewed articles and presented worldwide, with his research being cited more than 50,000 times.

Ranasinghe also has over 20 publications in Nature Portfolio journals, where, since 2022, he has been a member of the editorial board of Scientific Reports, for which he guest edited a special collection on sea level rise.

=== Academic positions ===
From 2008 to 2013, Ranasinghe was an associate professor at IHE Delft, and since 2014, he is the professor of climate change impacts and coastal risk at IHE Delft. In 2016, he also joined the University of Twente as a professor of climate change impacts and coastal risk, a position he still holds.

Ranasinghe also currently holds the AXA Chair in Climate Change Impacts and Coastal Risk at the Department of Coastal and Urban Risk & Resilience, IHE Delft and at the Department of Water Engineering and Management, University of Twente, along with an honorary professorship at the University of Melbourne.

=== Advisory and professional activities ===
Ranasinghe has supervised/co-supervised 25+ PhD candidates and numerous MSc students. He also has led a number of advisory and capacity development projects in several countries, including Sri Lanka, India, Vietnam, Thailand, Sao Tome and Principe, and Australia.

Ranasinghe led the development of Coastal Futures, an online tool launched in 2021 by IHE Delft that offers a comprehensive overview of state-of-the-art, global scale projections for sea level rise, coastal flooding, shoreline retreat, and extreme waves. This tool integrates multiple global data sets on coastal climate impact-drivers, providing users with a clear, up-to-date picture of potential future coastal hazards.

Ranasinghe has also been actively involved in the Intergovernmental Panel on Climate Change (IPCC) process and is currently Lead Author in Chapter 6 (Global projections of Earth system responses across time scales) in Working Group I of the IPCC Seventh Assessment Report (AR7). He was also a member of the IPCC Seventh Assessment Report (AR7) Scoping Team (Working Group I). In the IPCC AR6 cycle, he was Coordinating Lead Author in Chapter 12, a Lead Author of the Summary for Policymakers, and a Contributing Author in Chapters 9, 11 and the Atlas of the Working Group I contribution to the IPCC Sixth Assessment Report (AR6). Ranasinghe was also a Contributing Author in the IPCC Special Report on Oceans and Cryosphere in a Changing Climate (SROCC).

Ranasinghe pioneered the development of novel probabilistic, reduced complexity models, such as PCR, SMIC, and G-SMIC for assessing climate change induced coastal risks. He has been at the forefront of the development of several widely used global scale projections of climate change driven coastal hazards, such as extreme sea levels, coastal flooding and shoreline retreat.

=== Awards ===
Ranasinghe received the AXA Research Fund grant and holds the AXA Chair in Climate Change Impacts and Coastal Risks. His research focuses on studying the effects of climate change on coastal areas and evaluating adaptation strategies. These strategies include engineering solutions and softer approaches, such as spatial planning, innovative architecture, and construction techniques.

== Publications ==
=== Selected journal papers ===
- Nawarat, K., Reyns, J., Vousdoukas, M., Mulholland, E., van Ginkel, K., Feyen, L., Ranasinghe, R. 2026. Coastal Flood risk to European surface transport infrastructure at different levels of Global warming. Nature Climate Change, https://doi.org/10.1038/s41558-025-02510-y
- Basnayake, V., Duong, T., Ranasinghe, R., Almar, R., Wijnberg, K. 2026. A Global Assessment of Coastal Vulnerability and Dominant Contributors. Nature Communications, Vol 17, 528, https://www.nature.com/articles/s41467-025-67275-6
- Ranasinghe, R., Wang, Z., Bamunawala, J., Duong, T. 2025. On the time lag between sea-level rise and basin infilling at tidal inlets. Scientific Reports, Vol 15, 4231, https://www.nature.com/articles/s41598-025-86699-0
- Nawarat, K., Reyns, J., Vousdoukas, M., Duong, T., Kras, E., Ranasinghe, R. 2024. Coastal hardening and what it means for the World’s sandy beaches. Nature Communications, Vol 15, 10626, https://www.nature.com/articles/s41467-024-54952-1
- Vousdoukas, M., Clarke, J., Ranasinghe, R., Reimann, L., Khalaf, N., Duong, T., Ouweneel, B., Sabour, S., Iles, C., Trisos, C., Feyen, L., Mentaschi, L., Simpson, N. 2022. African Heritage Sites threatened by coastal flooding and erosion as sea-level rise accelerates. Nature Climate Change, Vol 12, 256-262, https://www.nature.com/articles/s41558-022-01280-1
- Tebaldi, C., Ranasinghe, R., Vousdoukas, M., Rasmussen, D. J., Vega-Westhoff, B., Kirezci, E., Kopp, R., Sriver, R., Mentaschi, L. 2021. Extreme Sea Levels at different global warming levels. Nature Climate Change, Vol 11, 746-751, https://www.nature.com/articles/s41558-021-01127-1
- Almar, R., Ranasinghe, R., Bergsma, E., Diaz, H., Melet, A., Papa, F., Vousdoukas, M., Athanasiou, P., Dada, O., Almeida, L., Kestenare, E. 2021. A global analysis of extreme coastal water levels with implications for potential coastal overtopping. Nature Communications, Vol 12, 3775, https://www.nature.com/articles/s41467-021-24008-9
- Vousdoukas, M., Ranasinghe, R., Mentaschi, L., Plomaritis, T., Athanasiou, P., Luijendijk, A., Feyen, L. 2020. Sandy coastlines under threat of erosion. Nature Climate Change, Vol 10(3), 260-263, https://www.nature.com/articles/s41558-020-0697-0
- Ranasinghe, R. 2020. On the need for a new generation of coastal change models for the 21st century. Scientific Reports, Vol 10, 2010, https://www.nature.com/articles/s41598-020-58376-x
- Ranasinghe, R., Duong, T., Uhlenbrook, S., Roelvink, D. and Stive, M. 2013. Climate Change impact assessment for inlet-interrupted coastlines. Nature Climate Change, Vol. 3, 83-87, https://www.nature.com/articles/nclimate1664
