= Kesera Senanayake =

Kesera Senanayake, JP, UM is a Sri Lankan diplomat, politician and a former Mayor of Kandy. The younger son of Edward Lionel Senanayake, former Speaker of the Sri Lankan Parliament and Seetha Senanayake.

Senanayake was educated at Trinity College, Kandy before attending the University of London where he received his law degree and a master's degree in International Law. He also a master's degree in Human Rights from the University of Colombo. In 1985 he entered in the Sri Lanka Overseas Service and served as a career diplomat for ten years before entering politics. In 1993 was elected to the Central Provincial Council and was re-elected in 1999. Senanayake was first elected as Mayor of Kandy, a post previously held by his father (1950–54, 1956–60, 1964–1968), in 2002, serving until 2006. In 2018 he was re-elected as Mayor.
