= Bennet Soysa =

Ceylonese politician and philanthropist

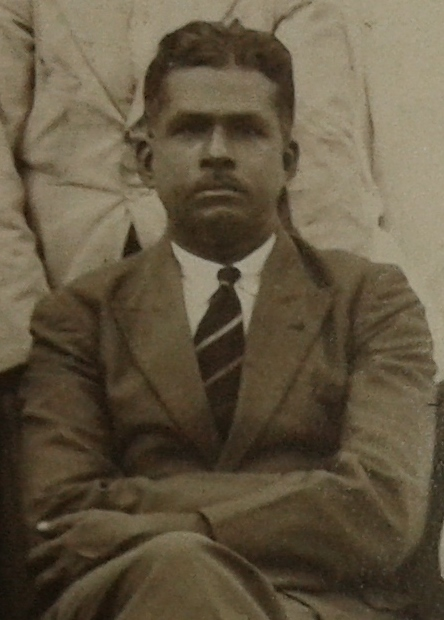
Sir Bennet Soysa.

Sir Bennet Soysa, CBE (30 March 1889 – 1981) was a Ceylonese politician and philanthropist. He was a member of the 2nd State Council of Ceylon and the Senate of Ceylon. He was also Mayor of Kandy on five occasions and dedicated his wealth for the propagation of Buddhism.

Born Warusahennidige Abraham Bastian Bennet Soysa, he was educated at St. John's College Panadura and Dharmaraja College, Kandy. His father was Warusahennidige Abraham Bastian Soysa and his grandfather was a cousin of Mudaliyar Jeronis de Soysa. He became successful in the transportation and the urban property sector.

Soysa was the founding president and patron of the Senkadagala Buddhist Cultural Society and was chiefly responsible for its Pilgrims Rest and the Cultural Hall. He was a patron and the treasurer of the Mahiyangana Raja Maha Vihara Restoration Society. He was also a patron of the Sri Dalada Maligawa, the Kandy General Hospital and the Dharmaraja College.

The Mahamaya Girls' College, Kandy (the first Buddhist Girls' school in Kandy) was founded by his wife Lady Sarah Soysa and Lady Chitravo Ratwatte and was greatly assisted by Soysa.

He was appointed a Members of the Order of the British Empire (MBE) in the 1950 New Year Honours, Commander of the Order of the British Empire (CBE) in the 1953 New Year Honours and made a Knights Bachelor in the 1954 Birthday Honours. The Sir Benet Soysa Cultural Hall and Sir Bennet Soysa Veediya in Kandy are named in recognition of his services to the Buddha Sasana and the city of Kandy.
