= Cudah Ratwatte =

Sir Jayatilaka Cudah Ratwatte Adigar (15 March 1880 – 27 March 1940) was a Ceylonese colonial-era politician and headman. He was a member of the State Council of Ceylon (1931–1933), the first elected Mayor of Kandy (1939–40), the first person from Kandy to be awarded a knighthood from the British and was appointed to the post of Adigar.

Born to Abeyratne Banda Ratwatte Basnayake and Thalgahagoda Lewke Punchi née Kumarihamy, he was educated at Trinity College, Kandy. His brothers were Barnes Ratwatte Dissawa and Harris Leuke Ratwatte both members of the State Council of Ceylon. He was the uncle of Sirimavo Ratwatte Dias Bandaranaike. In 1908 he married Chitravo Katugaha née Kumarihamy, with whom he had ten children including his eldest son, A. C. L. Ratwatte MBE (1909–1971), who also served as the Mayor Kandy (1948), Ceylon's High Commissioner in Ghana (1965) and Ceylon's Ambassador to Malaysia, Stanley Ratwatte and J. C. Ratwatte II.

Cudah Ratwatte served as the Shroff of the Mercantile Bank of Kandy. On 4 May 1931, Ratwatte was elected unopposed to the 1st State Council of Ceylon, representing Balangoda. He resigned from the State Council on 1 August 1933 due to ill-health. In 1939 he was granted a Knight Bachelor in the New Year Honours list for public services in Ceylon. At the first meeting of the Kandy Municipal Council on 17 June 1939 Ratwatte was elected the Mayor of Kandy, a position he retained for a year.

Ratwatte died on 27 March 1940 after a short illness.

== See also ==
- List of political families in Sri Lanka
