= Saraf (Sanaa) =

Saraf صرف
- Sub-district
- Location in Yemen
- Country: Yemen
- Governorate: Sana'a
- District: Bani Hushaysh

Population (2004)
  - Total: 3,485
- Time zone: UTC+3

Saraf (Arabic: صرف) is a sub-district located in Bani Hushaysh District, Sana'a Governorate, Yemen. Saraf had a population of 3485 according to the 2004 census.
