= Natha Devale, Kandy =

Monument

Natha Devale
- නාථ දේවාලය
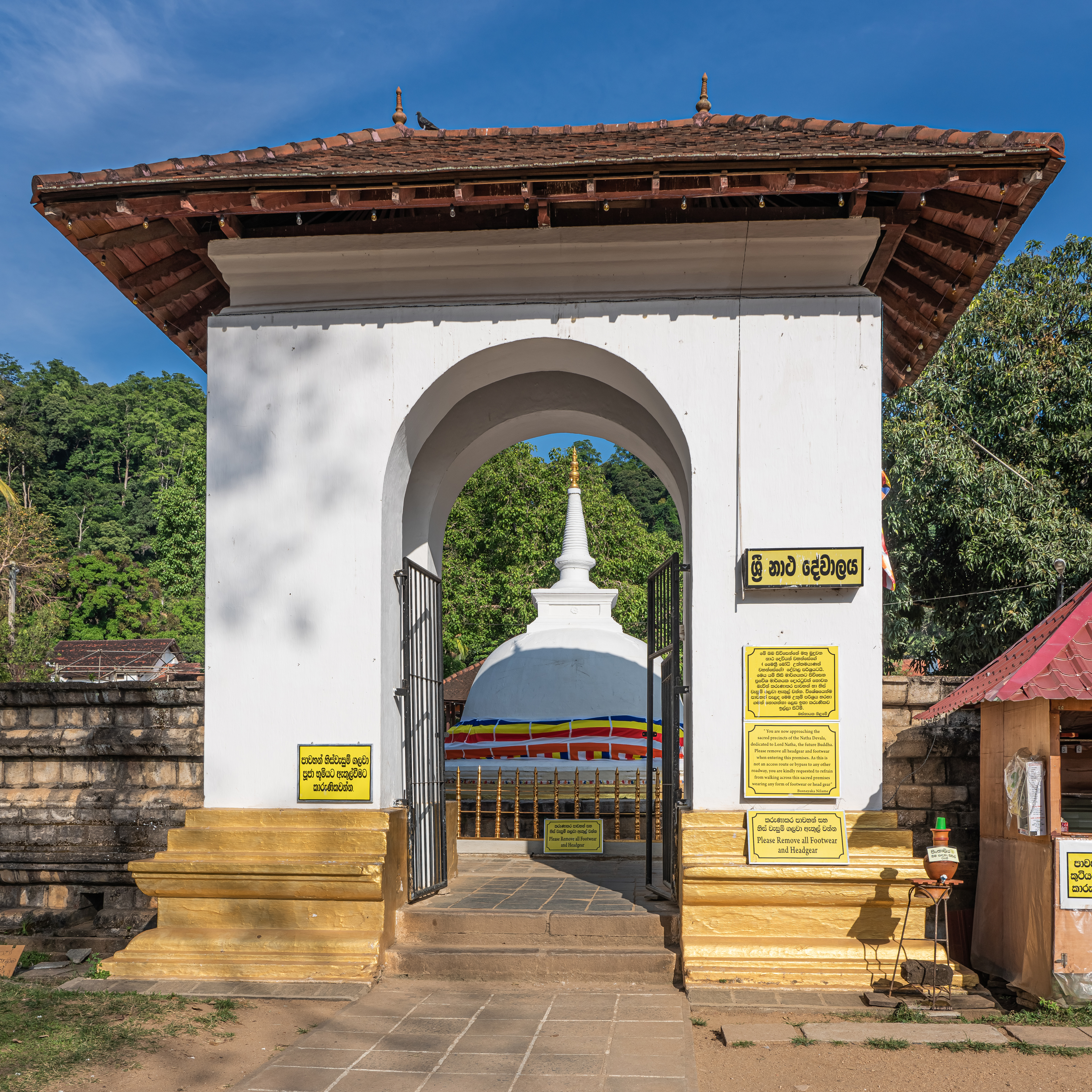
- Entrance

- Location within Sri Lanka

Religion
- Affiliation: Buddhism
- District: Kandy District
- Province: Central Province
- Deity: Natha

Location
- Location: Kandy
- Country: Sri Lanka
- Interactive map of Natha Devale
- Coordinates: 7.2942°N 80.6405°E

Architecture
- Archaeological Protected Monument of Sri Lanka
- Designated: 8 April 2009

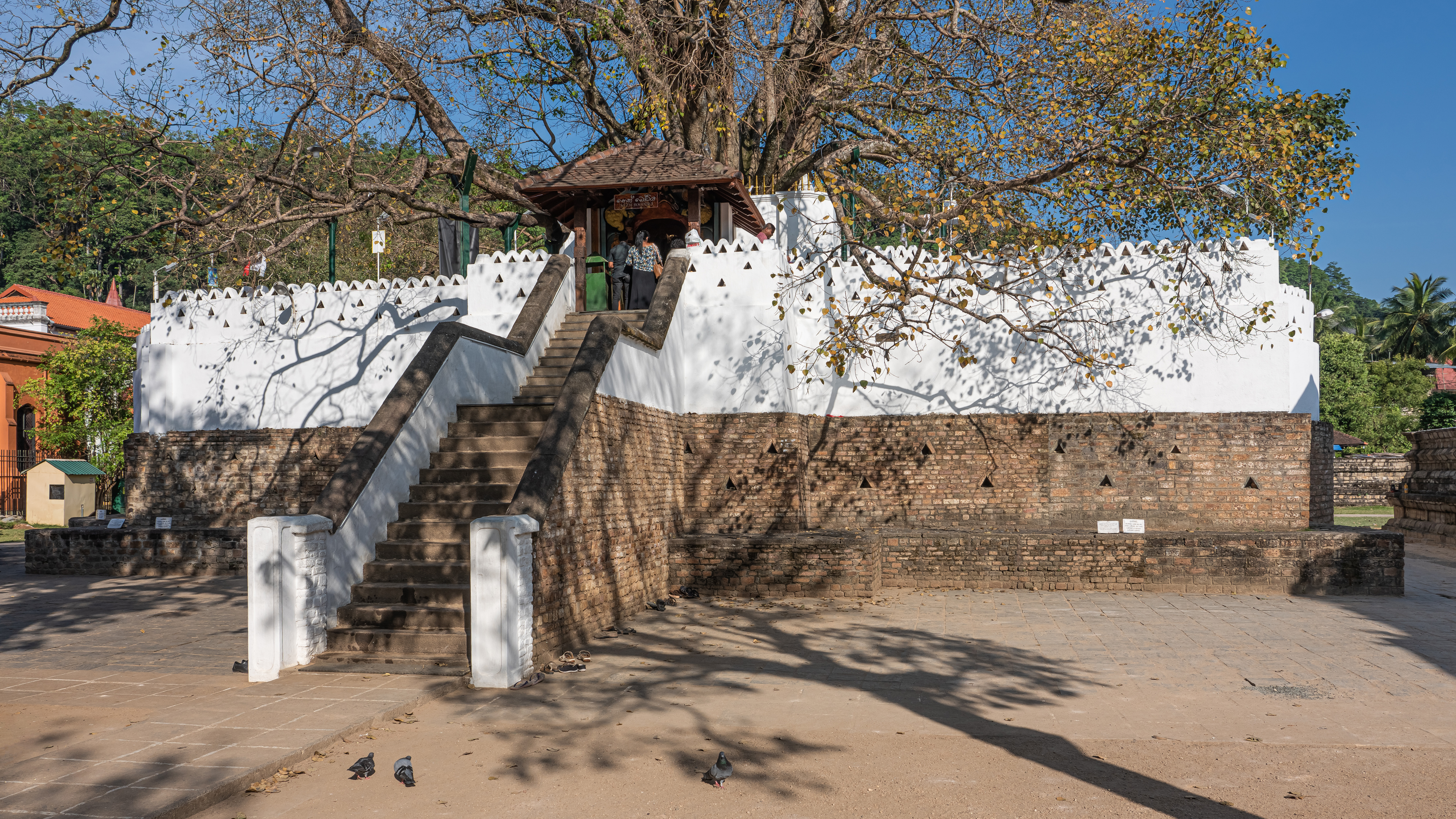
Bodhi Tree shrine

The Nātha Devāla is a historic shrine located on the terrace in front of the Royal Palace complex in Kandy, Sri Lanka. Tradition holds that the shrine existed even before the arrival of the Tooth Relic in Kandy. It is considered the oldest surviving structure in the city and is believed to have been constructed by King Vikramabahu III in the 14th century.

The origins of the worship of the deity Natha remain unclear. The name "Nātha" in Pali and Sanskrit literally means "lord" or "protector," and is generally locally associated with Maitreya, the future Buddha.

During the period of the Kingdom of Kandy, the shrine played an important role in royal ceremonies. Kings traditionally received their royal names at the Nātha Devāla. The Bodhisattva Avalokiteśvara, venerated as a healer, was also worshipped here, and until recent times the distribution of herbal preparations on New Year’s Day formed part of the shrine’s traditions. For this reason, Avalokiteśvara is closely associated with the Nātha Devāla.

In the annual Esala Perahera, the procession of the Nātha Devāla occupies a prominent position, following immediately after the Dalada Perahera.

To the north of the Nātha Devāla lies the Vishnu Devale, situated within the inner palace complex. This shrine is dedicated to the god Vishnu, one of the Hindu Trimurti, who is revered in Sri Lanka as a guardian deity of Buddhism. He is considered the divine protector of the island, and by extension, of the Buddhist faith itself.

According to Buddhist tradition, the Buddha prophesied that his teachings would endure for 5,000 years. More than 2,500 years of that period have already passed. Devotees believe that Natha continues to play a role in safeguarding Buddhism from the forces of Māra, sending celestial beings to protect the faith on earth.

== See also ==
- Maitreya
- Avalokiteśvara
- Temple of the Tooth
