= Kushil Gunasekera =

Sri Lankan social entrepreneur and philanthropist

Kushil Gunasekera is a Sri Lankan businessman, philanthropist, and a former first-class cricketer. Kushil is known for his social welfare efforts, and he is a founder and chief trustee of the Foundation of Goodness - a holistic rural community development model that bridges the urban-rural divide in Sri Lanka. His work transformed the livelihoods of thousands Sri Lankans, especially those who were adversely affected by the impact of the 2004 Indian Ocean tsunami.Kushil Gunasekera also became the first-ever personal manager for a Sri Lankan sportsman legendary cricketer Muttiah Muralitharan for over twenty years.

== Biography ==
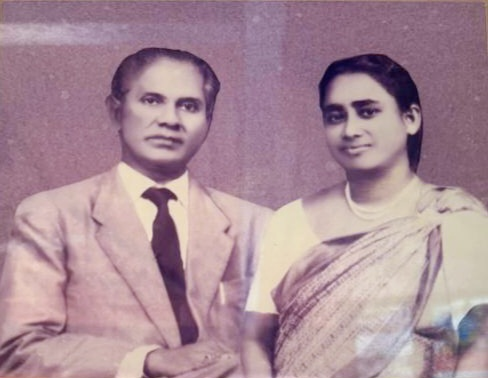
Shelton Gunasekera and Marlene Gunasekera in a family portrait.

Born in Colombo to his father attorney (Crown Proctor) Shelton Gunasekera and mother Marlene Gunasekera as fourth child from five, Kushil grew up in the South West of Sri Lanka in the village named Seenigama. He pursued his years 1 & 2 in Dharmashoka in Ambalangoda, year 3,4 & 5 at Trinity college in Kandy where he started to play under 12 cricket for Trinity team.In sixth grade Kushil transferred to Ananda College, where he played school cricket representing Ananda College in the first eleven team for multiple years. He turned up for Battle of the Maroons annual school big match encounter against rivals Nalanda College.

When Kushil went home for the holidays from his school in Colombo to Seenigama, he noticed the disparity between the village and city. Seeing hundreds of disadvantaged children who didn't have the same opportunities as others, he promised to himself that when he got the resources he would come back and provide the same facilities he had, which he accomplished with the Foundation of Goodness.

Kushil is a Buddhist.

== Cricket career ==
Kushil Gunasekera was appointed as the tournament secretary for the 2000 ICC Under-19 Cricket World Cup which was held in January 2000 in Sri Lanka. In April 2002 he was appointed to the Interim Committee as the Secretary for the Board of Control for Cricket in Sri Lanka. He also served as secretary of the governing board of Sri Lanka Cricket for a short stint in 2003. He held the position of the chairman of the tour organising committee on both occasions.

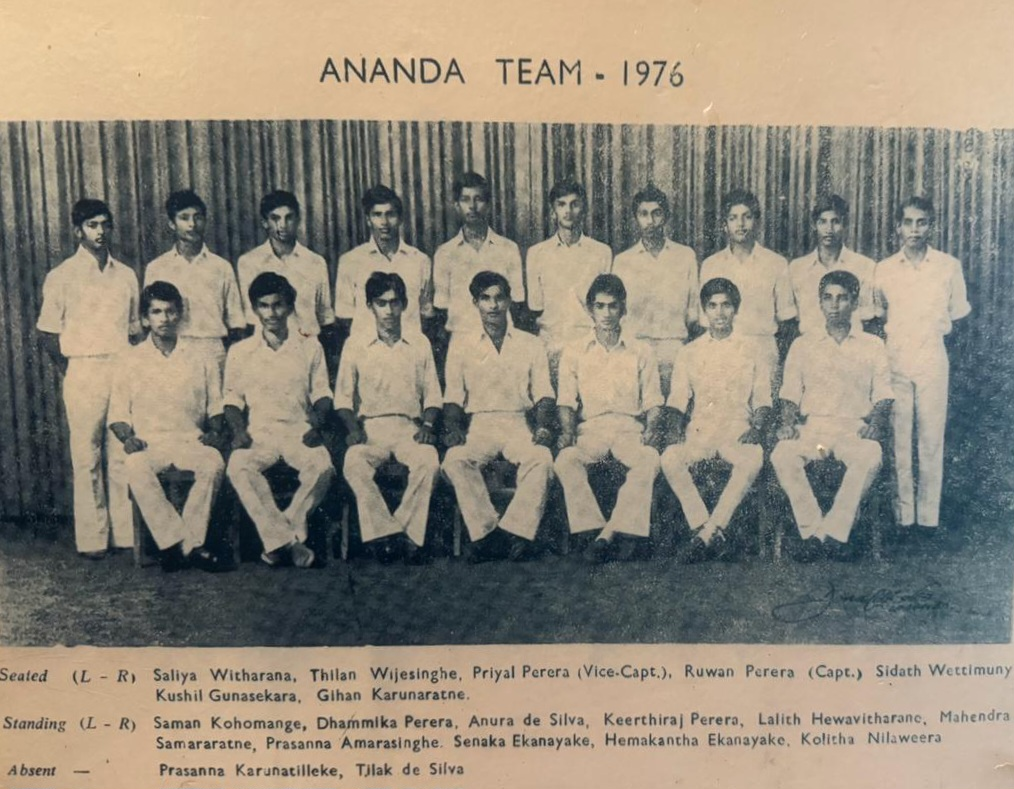
Kushil Gunasekera (seated second from right) as school cricket player representing Ananda College. Sri Lanka, 1976.

Kushil was known for having close links with Sri Lanka Cricket as well as with most of the national players of the Sri Lankan men's national cricket team. His association with Sri Lanka Cricket paid dividends as he received the backing from the relevant authorities to run his charity services at Foundation of Goodness. He was instrumental in getting the attention of former English cricketer Ian Botham and former Australian leg-spinner Shane Warne as they volunteered to help recover Seenigama village from the devastation caused by the tsunami.

In March 2021, he was one of the vocal critics of Sri Lanka Cricket who pointed out key structural constitutional amendments and reforms to address the underlying concerns related to the cricket system in Sri Lanka, which was evident with the downfall of the Sri Lankan national team in international cricket.

In 2012, he became the eleventh Sri Lankan to receive the honorary life membership of MCC, the home of cricket. He has also shown pathways to aspiring cricketers including Ramesh Mendis, Pulina Tharanga, Tharindu Kaushal and women's cricket by nurturing their potential abilities through the provision of scholarships academy training facilities at the Foundation of Goodness sports division.

== Charity work ==
Kushil initially pursued his interest in business. At a very young age he became a sales manager for Mercedes and Nissan, and he also had a successful business in trading sugar as the leading supplier, but later changed his mindset to become a full time social entrepreneur with the aim of helping the village of Seenigama, where he spent most of his childhood. He along with Muttiah Muralitharan and Ashan Malalasekera established the organization Foundation of Goodness in 1999. The organization was initially committed to the wellbeing of the Seenigama region (in southern Sri Lanka) supporting local communities through a range of projects across areas including children's needs, education and training, health care and psycho-social support, housing, empowering women, livelihoods, sport environment, life skills and good values. Now, the Foundation of Goodness has 18 village heartbeat empowerment model centers across Sri Lanka. All the programs are offered free of cost for rural beneficiaries. Kushil raised over 22 million USD towards humanitarian endeavours post Tsunami, showcasing what he does year after year with transparency and accountability at every step, surpassing donor expectations. The Foundation of Goodness's success lies in detailed and professional management, discipline, high standards, good governance and being highly principled and ethical in their standards.

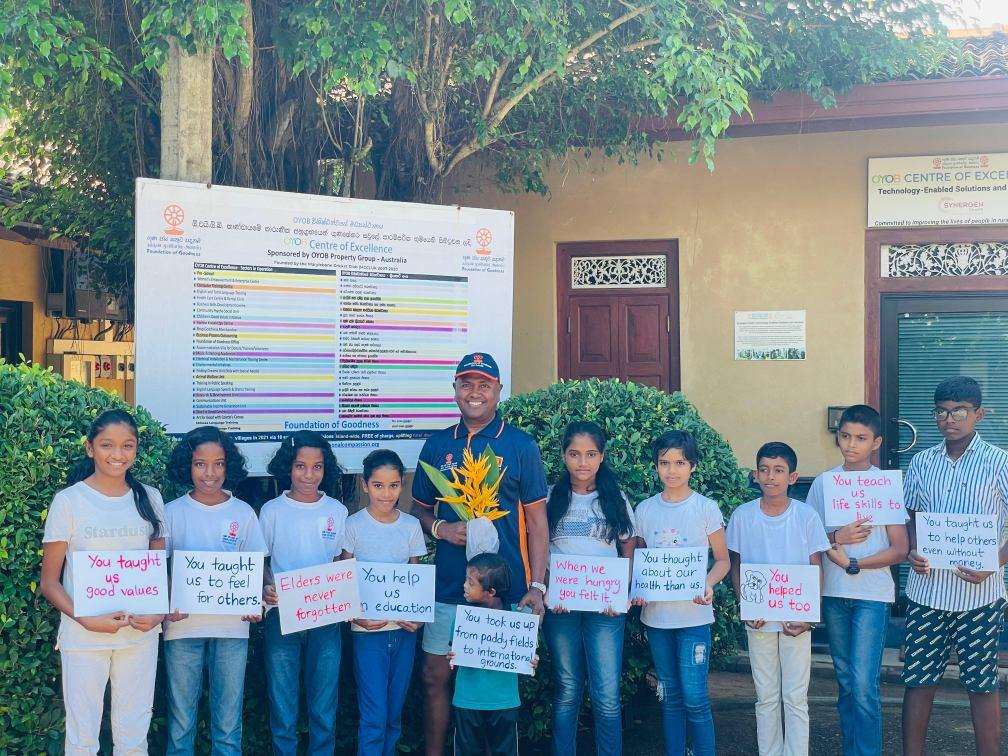
Kushil Gunasekera with children visiting the Centre of Excellence in Seenigama, Sri Lanka. November 2023.

Seenigama's fortunes looked bleak when the tsunami struck the area, as several houses collapsed along with the destruction of several livelihoods. The tsunami hit the region devastatingly, as the area had been majorly affected by years of sea coral mining. Kushil Gunasekera stepped up for rescue efforts with the support of cricketers Muttiah Muralitharan and Kumar Sangakkara to bring back the normalcy to Seenigama area. Kushil donated his newly built villa in Seenigama where he grew up to the Foundation of Goodness and turned it into a model campus with many empowerment sectors creating opportunities for these in need. In 2022 the Foundation of Goodness was able to help 307,000 disadvantaged people from 975 villages island-wide and 15,000 rural kids, youth and women study at the 18 empowerment centres located in 12 districts free of cost including life skills, good values and many popular subjects that are not in the school curriculum.

After the tsunami in 2004, Canadian rock singer and guitarist Bryan Adams decided to support Sri Lanka by auctioning his guitar. Most of Adams's philanthropic activity is through The Bryan Adams Foundation, which aims to improve the quality of people's lives around the world by providing financial grants to support specific projects that are committed to bettering the lives of other people. With the donated money, the Foundation of Goodness not only built a 25-meter swimming pool in Seenigama, but also transformed the surrounding land into a place full of sports activities for underprivileged village children. After the singer saw the transparent use of his money and the effort Kushil devotes to his activities, Adams sponsored the operation of the pool for the next two years.

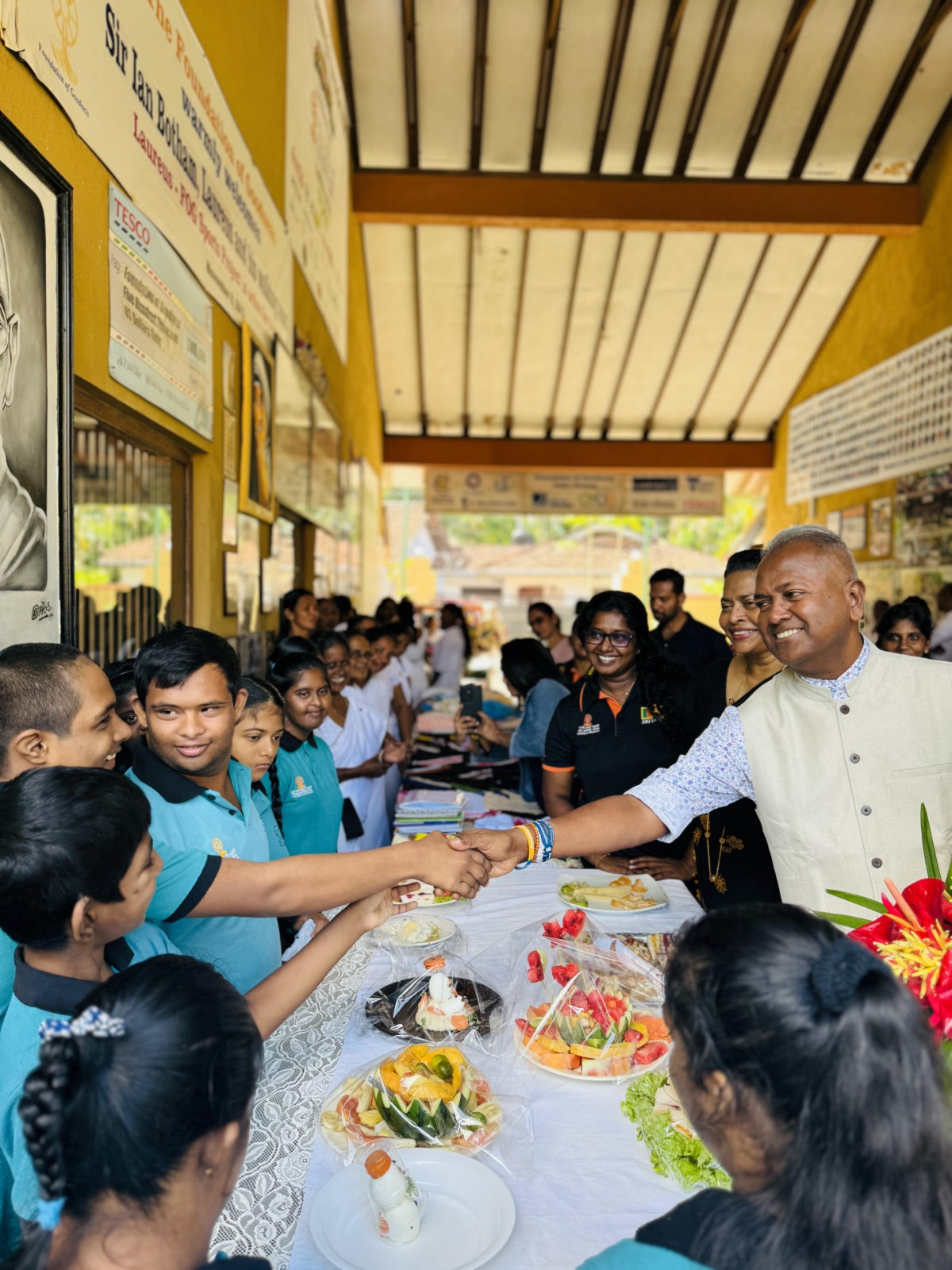
Kushil Gunasekera shaking hand with a child from Finding Dreams unite during the graduation ceremony at the Centre of Excellence in Seenigama, Sri Lanka January 2024.

In 2009, the story of Foundation of Goodness was featured on the Discovery Channel Asia on the fifth anniversary of the 2004 tsunami, and Kushil Gunasekera was also featured in the video, talking about the looming prospects that unfolded as a result of the tsunami's waves.

In August 2020, he collaborated alongside Keshini Ann Suraweera to establish Ceylon Artisan Network Market (CAN Market) with the intention of helping small-scale vendors by encouraging them in selling various products including innovative food items, fragrances, crafts and also the CAN Market was launched with the aim of rebooting the economy in wake of the economic crisis worsened by the COVID-19 pandemic. In October 2020, under his leadership, Foundation of Goodness made a fruitful collaboration with Tokyo Cement Group to reach out to domestically talented cricketers in the Northern Province and Eastern Province of Sri Lanka.

Kushil has won many awards for his charitable work. Among them are these: In 2017 he received the 'Outstanding Sri Lankan Role Model' Award by Sri Lanka Unites (a youth leadership movement for hope and reconciliation). In 2018 Kushil received the first ever Commonwealth Points of Light Award from her majesty the Queen via her son Prince Edward, Earl of Wessex. In the year 2023 Kushil became the runner up prize winner of The One Humanitarian Award 2023 by Hong Kong Rotary International District 3450 few highlights of many international recognitions including the UNV award for volunteering work at its best.

Kushil Gunasekera is also a founder of the Good Life Institute, an initiative by Foundation of Goodness to be better than we used to be.
