= Anuruddha Ratwatte =

Sri Lankan army officer and politician

General Anuruddha Ratwatte
- Ratwatte in Full General's insignia during military operations in the late 1990's.

Diyawadana Nilame of the Temple of the Sacred Tooth Relic Acting
- In office 1964–1965

Basnayake Nilame of Natha Devale, Kandy

Minister of Power and Energy and Deputy Defence Minister
- In office 1994–2001

Personal details
- Born: 14 July 1938 Kandy, Sri Lanka
- Died: 24 November 2011 (aged 73) Kandy, Sri Lanka
- Party: Sri Lanka Freedom Party
- Other political affiliations: United National Party
- Spouse(s): Carman Ratwatte (née Rangala)
- Children: Lohan, Mahendra & Chanuka
- Education: Trinity College, Kandy
- Occupation: Politics
- Profession: Politician

Military service
- Allegiance: Sri Lanka
- Branch/service: Sri Lanka Army
- Years of service: 1960–1977
- Rank: General
- Unit: Sri Lanka Sinha Regiment

General Anuruddha Leuke Ratwatte (14 July 1938 – 24 November 2011), frequently referred to as Anuruddha Ratwatte, was a Sri Lankan politician and an army officer. He was a Cabinet Minister and Deputy Minister of Defence.

== Early life ==
Born in Kandy to the old Radala Ratwatte family, he was the sixth of nine children born to Harris Ratwatte Dissawa and Mallika Katugaha Kumarihamy. A colonial era politician, Harris Ratwatte was a member of the State Council in 1936 to 1947 for Kegalle and United National Party Member of Parliament for Mawanella 1947 to 1952 Anuruddha Ratwatte was educated at Trinity College, Kandy, where he played rugby for his school.

Following his schooling, he volunteered in the Central Ceylon Youth Council, serving as the administrator of the Council office and library in Kandy in the late 1950s and early 1960s. He gained a commission as a volunteer officer in the rank of second lieutenant in the 2nd (V) Battalion, Ceylon Sinha Regiment (2CSR) based in Kandy under the command of Colonel S. D. Ratwatte. In 1960, his cousin Sirima Ratwatte Bandaranaike became prime minister. He received military training in Singapore, Malaysia and Thailand in 1961. When not mobilized for active service, Ratwatte served as the Acting Diyawadana Nilame (Chief lay Custodian) of the Sri Dalada Maligawa, Kandy during his father's tenure as Diyawadana Nilame and was a former Basnayake Nilame (Lay Custodian) of the Natha Devale, Kandy.

== Early political career ==
Anuruddha Ratwatte entered local government politics having been elected as a Municipal Councillor in the Kandy Municipal Council in 1966, from his father's party the United National Party. In the late 1960s, he crossed over to the Sri Lanka Freedom Party, led by his cousin Sirima Bandaranaike and became the Sri Lanka Freedom Party Chief Organizer for the Sengkadagala Electorate, contesting the 1970 general election from the Sengkadagala Electorate. Although his party won a landslide victory, he was defeated by Noel Wimalasena of the United National Party in the Senkadagala electorate.

== Field Security Detachment ==
In 1971, he was reinstated and promoted to the rank of lieutenant colonel in the Ceylon Army Volunteer Force and was appointed commanding officer of the Field Security Detachment, which was tasked with internal security. Prime Minister Sirima Bandaranaike was worried of a possible threat to the government from army officers loyal to the opposition political parties with her prior experience in the 1962 attempted coup d'état. Captain Denzil Kobbekaduwa, under Ratwatte's command reported a potential threat to the government by the Janatha Vimukthi Peramuna (JVP) which was preparing for an armed revolt. On 5 April 1971, the JVP attacked several police stations in a premature start to its planned insurrection. That evening, after police captured a group of JVP members who were planning to kidnap Prime Minister Bandaranaike from her private residence, Major General Sepala Attygalle and Lieutenant Colonel Ratwatte briefed Bandaranaike and escorted her to the Prime Minister's official residence Temple Trees, which became the operations center coordinating the counter-insurgency activity of the Ceylonese government. Field Security Detachment was tasked with the security of the Prime Minister and Temple Trees. Ratwatte retired from the Army in the late 1970s.

== Kandy Municipal Council ==
Ratwatte, as Sri Lanka Freedom Party Chief Organizer for the Sengkadagala Electorate again contested the 1977 general election from the Sengkadagala Electorate and lost to Shelton Ranaraja of the United National Party. He then contested and was elected to the Kandy Municipal Council in 1979 and served until 1986, during which time he became the leader of the opposition in the Kandy Municipal Council.

== Parliament ==
In February 1989, he entered parliament having been appointed to it by the National List from the Sri Lanka Freedom Party and sat in the opposition. In the 1994 general election, he was elected to parliament from the Kandy District from the Freedom Party and was appointed by Chandrika Kumaratunga, his niece as Cabinet Minister for Power and Energy; and Deputy Defense Minister. While Kumaratunga held the portfolio of Minister of Defense.

== Cabinet Minister and Deputy Defence Minister ==
Becoming Kumaratunga's chief defense adviser, Lt. Colonel Ratwatte became the de facto defence minister once hostilities in the Sri Lankan Civil War commenced following the Bombing of SLNS Sooraya and SLNS Ranasuru which started the Eelam War III in April 1995. The government felt betrayed by the LTTE in its earlier peace talks and looked into defeating the LTTE militarily. Ratwatte strongly advocated the recapture of the LTTE controlled Jaffna Peninsula. Although symbolically important, the Army Commander Lieutenant General Gerry De Silva refused to deploy troops to recapture the Jaffna peninsula due to the need for large troop numbers to defend it from the LTTE that would withdraw to the jungles of Wanni. De Silva was overruled and planning commenced under Major General Rohan Daluwatte for Operation Riviresa. Launched in late 1995, Operation Riviresa under Daluwatte recapture of the Jaffna peninsula, but failed to cut off LTTE units that withdrew to the jungles of Wanni. The recapture of Jaffna was well celebrated and Ratwatte who oversaw it as deputy defence minister; was promoted to the rank of general by President Chandrika Kumaratunga in 1995 and was awarded the Riviresa Campaign Services Medal. The following year the government faced a major defeat in the Battle of Mullaitivu in which it lost an entire brigade and was forced to withdraw from Mullaitivu. Government forces responded by recapturing the strategic town of Kilinochchi. Having the burden of defending the Jaffna peninsula and no land route to resupply, Ratwatte initiated Operation Jayasikurui in 1997; it failed to achieve its primary objective of gaining a land route to the Jaffna peninsula and was called off by President Kumaratunga in 1999. This led to his falling out of favour with President Kumaratunga, who established the post of Chief of the Defence Staff to reduce Ratwatte's influence over the operational matters of the military. He remained a Cabinet Minister until his party was defeated in the 2001 general elections.

== Later life ==
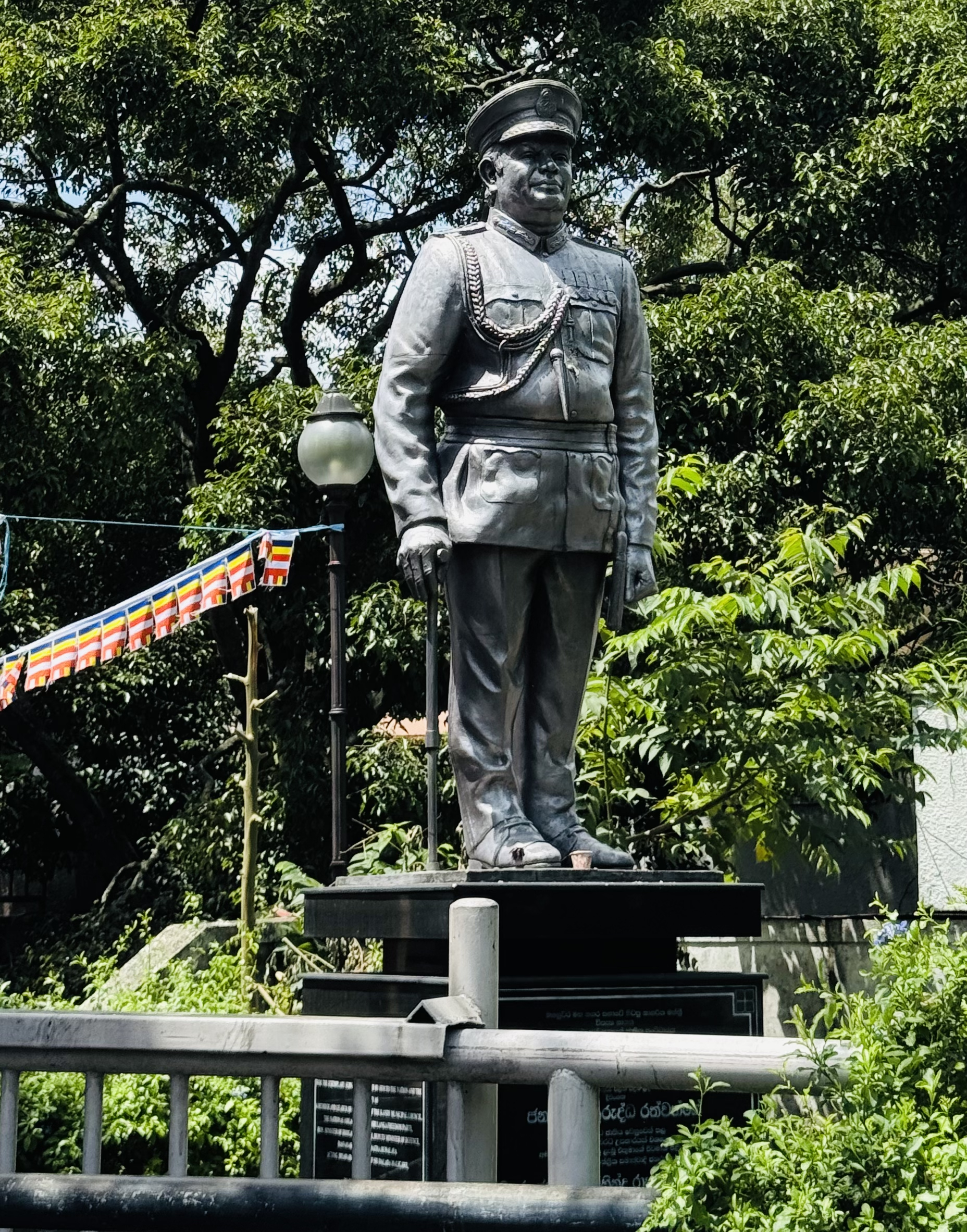
Anuruddha Ratwatte Statue at Kandy

Ratwatte was re-elected to Parliament in 2000 and 2001, however, he retired from politics in 2004, facing fraud and criminal charges against him since the early 2000s.

He died on 24 November 2011 at the Kandy General Hospital following complications of a fall he sustained in his home. A statue of him was built in the Kandy City Center in 2013.

== Family ==
He married Carman Rangala, the Librarian of the Youth Council Library in 1967. Their eldest son Lohan was a Minister and Member of Parliament representing the Kandy District and second son Mahendra is the former Mayor of Kandy. His second marriage was to Ramani Imbuldeniya in 1996.[10]

== Decorations ==
During his service as an volunteer officer from 1960 to 1977, he received the Republic of Sri Lanka Armed Services Medal in 1972 and the Sri Lanka Army 25th Anniversary Medal in 1974. During his tenure as Deputy Defense Minister from 1994 to 2000, he received the Riviresa Campaign Services Medal in 1996, Purna Bhumi Padakkama in 1996 and the 50th Independence Anniversary Commemoration Medal in 1998.

	Republic of Sri Lanka Armed Services Medal	Sri Lanka Army 25th Anniversary Medal
Purna Bhumi Padakkama	Riviresa Campaign Services Medal	50th Independence Anniversary Commemoration Medal

== See also ==
- Diyawadana Nilame, Sri Dalada Maligawa, Kandy
- List of political families in Sri Lanka
