= Ratte potato =

Variety of potato

Potato 'Ratte'
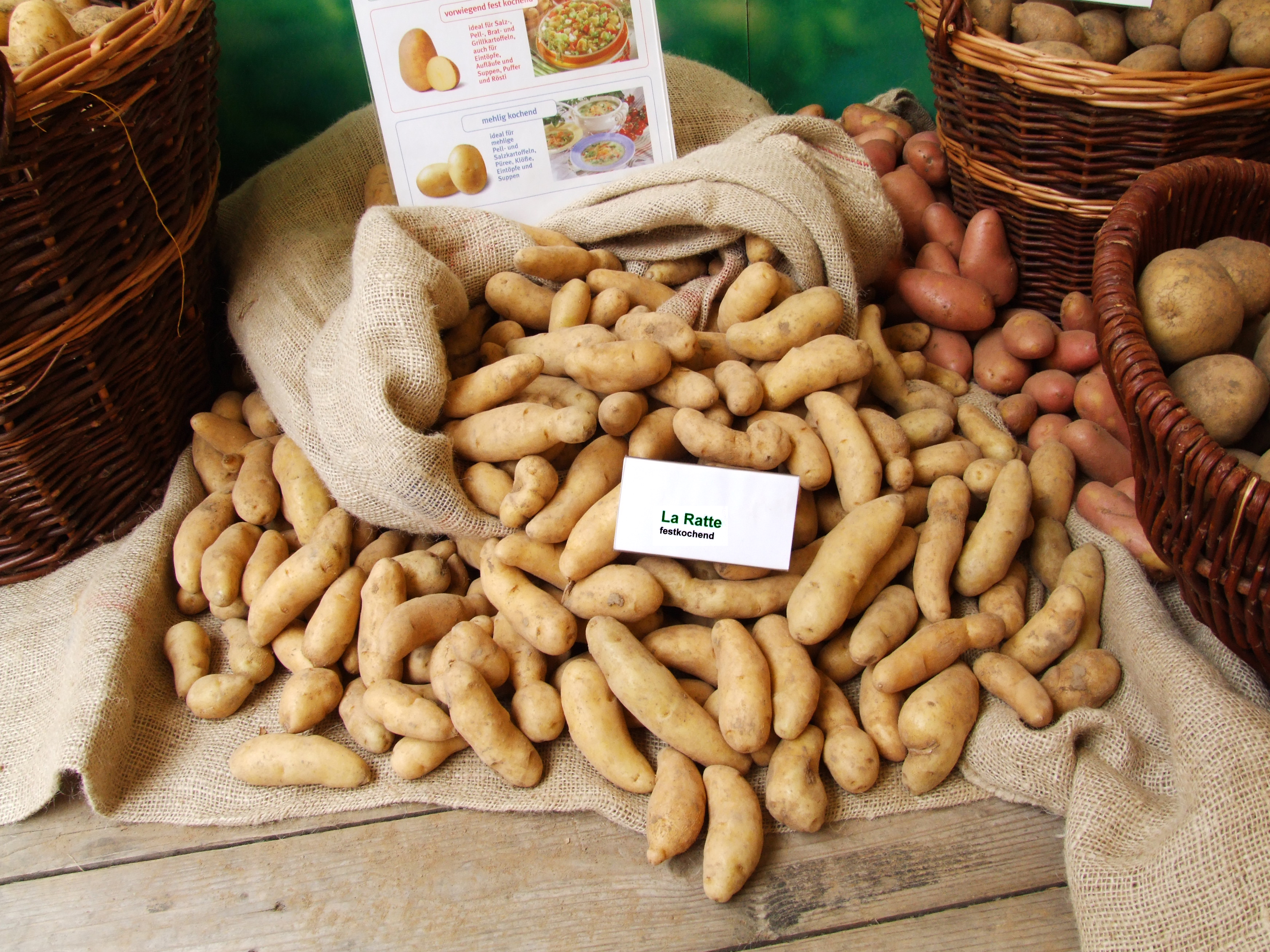
- Ratte potatoes
- Genus: Solanum
- Species: Solanum tuberosum
- Cultivar: 'Ratte'
- Origin: Denmark or France

The Ratte potato (also known as La Ratte, La Reine Ratte du Touquet, or Asparges) is a small potato with a unique nutty flavor and smooth, buttery texture. The nutty flavour is said to have come from the types of soil the variety is grown in by the French farmers. This potato has an ovate shape, often with a slight curve and golden speckled skin. The flesh of this potato is a golden yellow and its texture maintains even when cooking.

The variety originated in Denmark or France, in the late 19th century and is a favorite of French chefs, including Joël Robuchon who used them to make potato puree. Other chefs have recommended roughly mashing them or using them in salads or casseroles. The New York Times reported that its taste "hints richly of hazelnuts and chestnuts". This variety is known for its excellent texture and flavour, it is normally harvested by hand and low yielding. Because of the low yield and hand harvest this variety fetches a high price and it is known as a boutique potato.
