= Ambawela =

- Village
- Location within Sri Lanka
- Country: Sri Lanka
- Province: Central Province
- District: Nuwara Eliya
- Time zone: UTC+5:30 (Sri Lanka Standard Time)

Ambawela is a village in Sri Lanka. It is located within Central Province's Nuwara Eliya city.

== See also ==
- List of towns in Central Province, Sri Lanka
