= Charitha Ratwatte III =

Sri Lankan lawyer and bureaucrat (born 1948)

Charitha Ratwatte
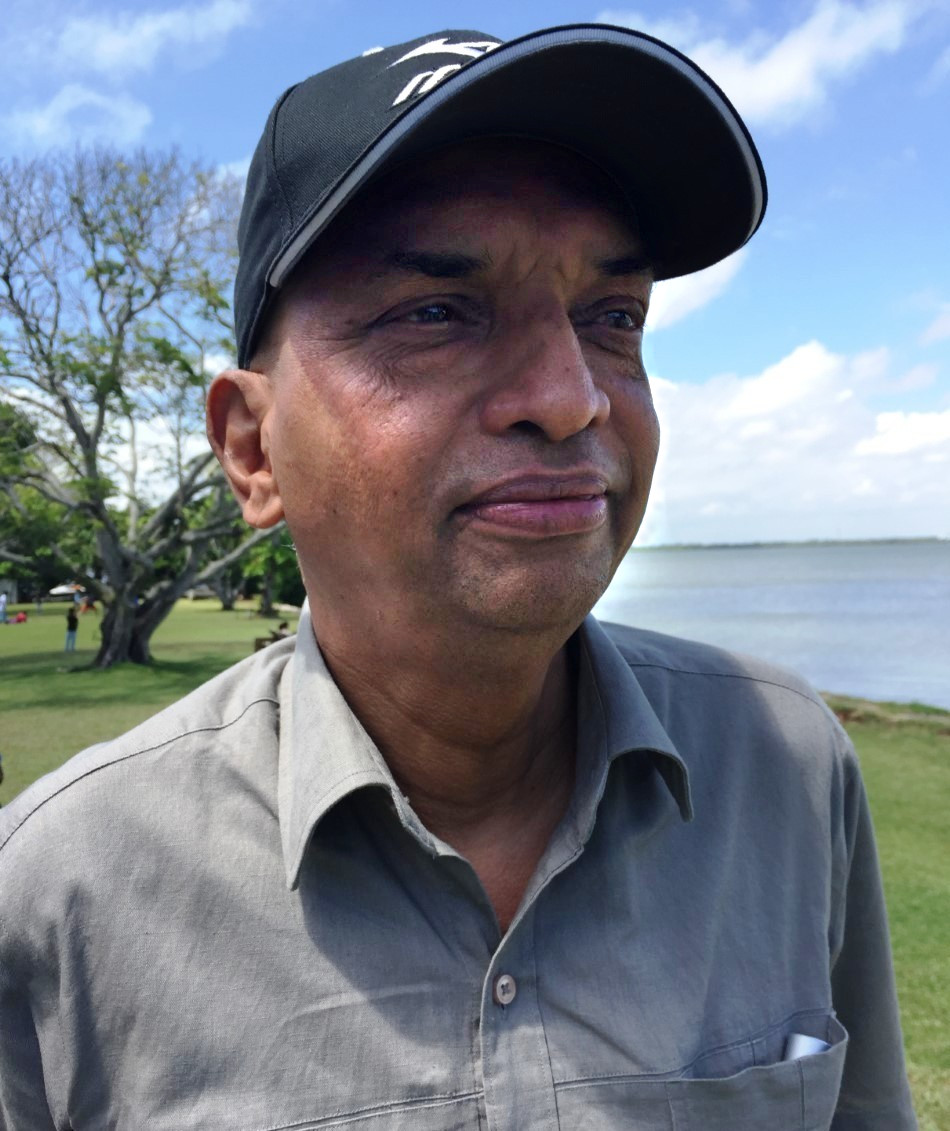

Jayampathy Charitha Ratwatte III (known as Charitha Ratwatte; born 1948) is a Sri Lankan lawyer and bureaucrat. He is a senior adviser to the Prime Minister of Sri Lanka and former Secretary to the Treasury. He was the chairman of the United National Party.

He is the son of J. C. Ratwatte Adigar, a member of the State Council of Ceylon, who hailed from a prominent Radala family from the Kingdom of Kandy. Educated at Royal College Colombo, Ratwatte graduated from the University of Ceylon, Colombo, with a degree in law in 1970 and took oaths as an advocate.

In 1977, Ratwatte was appointed by President J. R. Jayawardene as Chairman of the National Youth Services Council and became the Director General of Youth Services in 1979. He was later appointed as Permanent Secretary to the Ministry of Youth Affairs. Since 1994, he has been the managing director of the Sri Lanka Business Development Centre, with the exception of 2002 to 2004, when he was appointed as Secretary to the Treasury and Ministry of Finance.

== Investigations and Arrest ==
Ratwatte was arrested on 4 November 2025 in connection on corruption charges by the Commission to Investigate Allegations of Bribery or Corruption (CIABOC).

He married Chulanee Nelunkanthi. Their son Jayampathy Charitha Ratwatte IV is a social entrepreneur and corporate executive and have a daughter Prashanthi Ratwatte.

== See also ==
- List of political families in Sri Lanka
- List of Sri Lankan non-career Permanent Secretaries
