= Lohan Ratwatte =

Sri Lankan politician (1968–2025)

- ලොහාන් රත්වත්ත. පුෂ්පකමල් லோகான் ரத்வத்தே

State Minister of Plantation Industries and Mahaweli Development
- In office 8 September 2022 – 24 November 2024
- President: Ranil Wickremesinghe
- Prime Minister: Dinesh Gunawardena

State Minister of Warehousing, Containers, Yards, Port Supplies and Boat and Shipping Development
- In office 10 March 2022 – 7 September 2022
- President: Gotabaya Rajapaksa; Ranil Wickremesinghe
- Prime Minister: Mahinda Rajapaksa; Ranil Wickremesinghe; Dinesh Gunawardena

State Minister of Gem and Jewelry Related Industries
- In office 12 August 2020 – 7 September 2022
- President: Gotabaya Rajapaksa; Ranil Wickremesinghe
- Prime Minister: Mahinda Rajapaksa; Ranil Wickremesinghe; Dinesh Gunawardena

State Minister of Prison Management and Prisoners’ Rehabilitation
- In office 30 November 2020 – 15 September 2021
- President: Gotabaya Rajapaksa
- Prime Minister: Mahinda Rajapaksa

Member of Parliament for Kandy District
- In office 22 April 2010 – 24 September 2024

Personal details
- Born: 22 June 1968 Kandy, Sri Lanka
- Died: 15 August 2025 (aged 57) Colombo, Sri Lanka
- Party: Sri Lanka Podujana Peramuna (2019–2025); Sri Lanka Freedom Party (until 2019)
- Other political affiliations: United People's Freedom Alliance
- Spouse: Shashi Prabha Rajapaksha Ratwatte
- Relations: Ratwatte family Bandaranaike family
- Children: 2
- Parent(s): Anuruddha Ratwatte; Carman Ratwatte
- Education: Trinity College Kandy
- Occupation: Politician; Rugby coach

Lohan Evindra Ratwatte (22 June 1968 – 15 August 2025) was a Sri Lankan politician. He was the State Minister of Gem and Jewellery Related Industries and a Member of Parliament from the Kandy District. He was the eldest son of General Anuruddha Ratwatte, a cabinet minister and deputy defence minister.

== Early life and education ==
Ratwatte was born on 22 June 1968 in Kandy to General Anuruddha Ratwatte and Carman Ratwatte née Rangala. He was the eldest with two younger brothers, Mahendra Ratwatte and Chanuka Ratwatte. The Ratwattes were an old Radala family descending from the courtiers of the Kingdom of Kandy, with Ratwatte, Dissawa of Matale signing the Kandyan Convention. His grandfather Harris Leuke Ratwatte was a colonial-era legislator.

Ratwatte was educated at Trinity College, Kandy, where he played rugby and was a member of its unbeaten league-winning side of 1987. He was awarded the Trinity Lion award and later represented the Kandy Sports Club and Upcountry. Ratwatte also served as a rugby coach at Trinity College prior to entering politics.

== Political career ==
Ratwatte was elected to the Central Provincial Council in 2009 and was first elected to parliament in the 2010 parliamentary election from Kandy representing the Sri Lanka Freedom Party (SLFP).

In 2012, he was appointed SLFP chief organizer of Pathadumbara by president Mahinda Rajapaksa, succeeding his father Anuruddha Ratwatta. He served as State Minister of Road Development.

Ratwatte was re-elected to parliament in 2015 and 2020. In August 2020, he was appointed State Minister of Gem and Jewellery Related Industries and in December 2020 he was given the additional portfolio of State Minister of Prison Management and Prisoners' Rehabilitation.

== Controversies ==
=== 1997 assault allegations ===
In mid-March 1997, just before the local council elections, United National Party (UNP) candidate Sudeera Yapa lodged a complaint with the Kandy Police alleging assault. According to Yapa, while he and a supporter were hanging posters outside the UNP office, Ratwatte arrived in a silver-coloured Toyota, fired shots into the air, and allowed his bodyguard to assault the two. Yapa further claimed he was struck on the head with a knuckle-duster. Despite the complaint, the Kandy Police reportedly took no action.

=== Murder of Joel Pera ===
In May 1997, Ratwatte was named by eyewitnesses as being present at the scene of the killing of Papua New Guinea rugby player Joel Pera outside the Carlton Club in Kollupitiya, Colombo. Media reports at the time criticised police inaction in locating him for nearly a month, citing his status as the son of government minister Anuruddha Ratwatte. The case drew attention in the Sri Lankan Parliament and led to diplomatic concerns from Papua New Guinea.

Ratwatte and two other suspects were later discharged from the case on the advice of the Attorney General. Kumar Ponnambalam, a politician and lawyer representing the Pera family, criticized the police investigation, specifically pointing out that no "Paraffin test" or other modern forensic test was used to determine if Ratwatte had recently used a firearm. Ponnambalam stated that although the case could theoretically be reopened, the lack of police support made a private prosecution unlikely to succeed. Ponnambalam was himself later assassinated in January 2000.

=== Election-related violence (1999-2000) ===
During the presidential election in December 1999, the Centre for Monitoring Election Violence (CMEV) reported that Lohan Ratwatte, son of then–Deputy Defence Minister Anuruddha Ratwatte, was involved in intimidating voters and opposition polling agents in Wattegama and surrounding areas of the Patadumbara electorate in the Central Province. According to CMEV, ruling People’s Alliance (PA) supporters engaged in widespread violence, ballot rigging, and attacks against opposition members and election monitors in parts of Kandy, Nuwara Eliya, and Matale districts. Including the subsequent parliamentary election in 2000, Ratwatte has been implicated in election-related violence across multiple polls, often in connection with his father.

Following these events, Ratwatte was arrested and taken to Colombo in October 2000, following pressure from senior police officers, after reports of sustained involvement in election-related violence in Kandy. The arrest reportedly followed an incident in which he allegedly led a group of approximately one hundred people to threaten H.M.S. Herath, the Kandy Deputy Inspector General of Police (DIG) and firing at him. A curfew was declared in Kandy following the shootout by the heavily armed gang led by Ratwatte, with eight individuals arrested in connection to the incident.

The Sri Lanka Muslim Congress (SLMC) reported that Ratwatte’s younger brother, Chanuka Ratwatte, had led a heavily armed People's Alliance (PA) gang that attacked the polling booth in Akurana, resulting in two deaths and fifty-four injuries among SLMC supporters, while ballot boxes were allegedly stuffed for the PA. Political parties and independent observers stated that both Lohan and Chanuka Ratwatte were responsible for much of the intimidation, shootings, and rigging in the Kandy district on election day.

Ratwatte was questioned at Police Headquarters in Colombo and subsequently remanded by the chief magistrate in Kandy until 28 October. The Kandy district reportedly experienced widespread voter intimidation, ballot rigging, and violence, prompting the Commissioner of Elections to delay vote counting and cancel polling in 13 booths. Election observers and religious leaders, including the Malwatte Mahanayake, stated that the elections in Kandy were affected by violence, with the VIP family identified as primarily responsible.

=== Assassination of Kumar Ponnambalam ===
In a confidential police report submitted by SSP Bandula Wickramasinghe to then-President Chandrika Kumaratunga and later published in The Sunday Leader newspaper, the assassination of lawyer and politician Kumar Ponnambalam on 5 January 2000 was organized by Baddegana Sanjeewa, a member of the Presidential Security Division. The report implicated Lohan Ratwatte and his brother Mahendra Ratwatte in the killing, stating that Mahendra had instigated the murder and that they had allegedly harbored an underworld criminal named Dhammika Perera, who was wanted for 17 murders. Sanjeewa was later shot dead in November 2001, allegedly by Dhammika Perera. While some of the individuals implicated in the murder were subsequently killed, to this day, no individual has been prosecuted or convicted for Ponnambalam's assassination.

=== Udathalawinna massacre ===
On 5 December 2001, during the 2001 parliamentary elections, ten Muslim supporters of the Sri Lanka Muslim Congress escorting a ballot box in Udathalawinna were ambushed and shot dead at point-blank range in an incident known as the Udathalawinna massacre. The victims, aged between 19 and 31, were killed shortly after the election. Human rights organizations and civil society groups alleged that the killings were politically and racially motivated and carried out by a group allegedly under the control of Lohan Ratwatte, whose father was the then-incumbent Deputy Defence Minister. Ratwatte was charged with the murder of the ten SLMC supporters.

Following the change in government on 7 December 2001, Ratwatte reportedly fled the country with his wife and children as his father lost his parliamentary seat. Lohan, along with his father Anuruddha Ratwatte and brother Chanuka Ratwatte, was later arrested and stood trial for the murders.

In 2006, the Colombo High Court acquitted Lohan Ratwatte, Chanuka Ratwatte, and Anuruddha Ratwatte of all charges. Presiding Judge Deepali Wijesundera stated that eyewitness testimony, including that of the sole survivor Mohammed Malik, failed to prove the direct involvement of the three. The court also acquitted eight other defendants, including five Sri Lanka Army soldiers. However, five former security personnel associated with the Ratwatte family, Lieutenant Ranjith Dharmasiri Wijeratne, Sunil de Silva, Kamal Wijeratne, Anura Kumara, and Buddhi Dissanayake, were found guilty of conspiracy to murder and sentenced to death. They also received an additional 100 years of rigorous imprisonment.

=== 2013 Kelebokka polling station incident ===
On 21 September 2013, during the Central Provincial Council elections, a group led by then–Kandy District Parliamentarian Lohan Ratwatte attacked the polling station at Kelebokka Abhirama Maha Vidyalaya in the Pathadumbara constituency, reportedly firing shots into the air. The incident was investigated by election authorities and the police, though no legal action was ultimately pursued against Ratwatte.

=== Forced entry into Ruwanweli Seya ===
On 5 December 2020, Ratwatte, accompanied by family members and security personnel, visited the Ruwanweli Seya shrine in Anuradhapura after midnight, beyond the permitted hours of worship. Reports indicated that Ratwatte, who was allegedly intoxicated, attempted to gain entry despite the gates being locked by police at 10 p.m. as per routine practice. He was said to have verbally confronted officers on duty and attempted to force his way into the premises. According to police accounts, Ratwatte was later found lying on the ground in a state of undress. The incident was reported to the Udamaluwa Police Station and brought to the attention of the Swarnamali Maha Seya Viharaya Chief Incumbent, Venerable Pallegama Hemarathana Thero. Ratwatte denied all allegations and no disciplinary or legal action was taken against him following the incident.

=== W15 shooting incident ===
In December 2020, an incident involving Ratwatte (now serving as the State Minister of Prison Management and Prisoners’ Rehabilitation) occurred at the W15 boutique hotel in Kandy. During a dinner with parliamentarian S. M. Marikkar and hotel owner Hisham 'Hardy' Jamaldeen, an argument broke out between Ratwatte and Marikkar over political influence. Following the dispute, Ratwatte allegedly pulled out his pistol and fired multiple shots into the air, causing panic among the guests and their children. He was also accused of forcing the wives of Jamaldeen and Marikkar to hold his pistol and fire it. The incident was later reportedly covered up with the cooperation of those involved, and the hotel bills of guests who witnessed the event were waived in exchange for their silence.

=== Welikada prison incident ===
In September 2021, Ratwatte, accompanied by a group of intoxicated associates, forcibly entered the premises of the Welikada Prison. The group, under the influence of alcohol, verbally abused prison staff after being denied access to certain areas, including the gallows. A prison source alleged that Ratwatte was carrying a pistol at the time, while several of his companions, visibly intoxicated, hurled abuse at officials who attempted to prevent their entry.

=== Anuradhapura prison incident ===
In a separate incident, in September 2021, Ratwatte received negative publicity over an incident where he reportedly threatened Tamil political prisoners. It was reported that on 12 September a drunken Ratwatte had stormed into the Anuradhapura Prison and demanded to meet Tamil prisoners being held under the Prevention of Terrorism Act. When 10 Tamil prisoners were brought to Ratwatte, he addressed them in the Sinhala language; and when one prisoner protested that they did not know Sinhala, an enraged Ratwatte began verbally abusing the prisoners for not knowing the language despite living in a “Sinhala country”, using the ethnic slur “Para Demala”, and told them to go to India for not understanding Sinhala. Using interpreters, he warned the prisoners not to betray the country to the United Nations or the Tamil diaspora since the UN was set to take up the island's human rights issues the following week. Ratwatte then brandished his pistol and ordered the Tamil prisoners to kneel before him at gunpoint and subjected them to further verbal abuse. While interrogating the prisoners, he asked them if they had killed any soldiers and threatened to kill one of them by placing the pistol to his forehead. Ratwatte allegedly stated that then-incumbent president Gotabaya Rajapaksa had authorized him to do whatever he wanted to the Tamil political prisoners, and that he could either release them or kill them.

Following public outcry, Ratwatte tendered his resignation as state minister on 15 September and acknowledged his responsibility for the incidents. On 8 June 2023, based on the report of the Justice Ministry’s Committee which found credible evidence of serious human rights violations during Ratwatte’s visit to the prison, the Centre for Society and Religion (CSR) called for Ratwatte to be investigated and prosecuted under the UNCAT for mistreatment of prisoners and under the ICCPR for “advocating national hatred constituting incitement to discrimination by harassment of Tamil detainees”.

=== Shooting a pet dog ===
In October 2022, while serving as the State Minister of Plantation Industries during a visit to Vadamarachchi, Jaffna, Ratwatte’s ministerial security officer shot and killed a pet dog that barked at the State Minister. Officials claimed the dog had attempted to attack him. The incident drew criticism from local residents and animal rights activists, who condemned the killing as “inhuman and uncivilised behaviour” and discussed pursuing legal action.

=== Seizure of an unregistered luxury vehicle ===
On 26 October 2024, police seized an unregistered luxury vehicle from a residence belonging to Ratwatte's wife in Mirihana. DIG Ruwan Gunasekera stated that Ratwatte initially attempted to mislead investigators by claiming the car had been brought to the residence by his late coordinating secretary. The 50-year-old secretary was subsequently found dead from gunshot injuries near Ratwatte’s office in Mahaiyawa on 20 October 2024 and later died at the National Hospital in Kandy, in what police ruled as a suicide.

Investigations revealed that Ratwatte had been using the vehicle since 2020 with a fake number plate and falsified chassis number. He was arrested on 31 October, and his wife was later remanded. Authorities are also investigating potential violations under the Motor Traffic Act, Criminal Procedure Act, Prevention of Money Laundering Act, and the Customs Ordinance.

=== Drunk driving incident ===
On 6 December 2024, Ratwatte was involved in a road accident near the Kollupitiya Junction while allegedly driving under the influence of alcohol. Following a complaint to the Kollupitiya Police, investigations confirmed that Ratwatte was intoxicated at the time, leading to his arrest on charges of causing an accident while driving under the influence.

== Death ==
Ratwatte died on 15 August 2025, at the age of 57. He died at a hospital in Colombo while undergoing treatment for a liver-related condition.

== See also ==
- List of political families in Sri Lanka
