= J. C. Ratwatte II =

Sir James Cudah Ratwatte (known as J. C. Ratwatte Adigar ) was a Ceylonese legislator. He was an elected member of the State Council of Ceylon for Balangoda in 1931 and was appointed Adigar by the British Government of Ceylon. He was the first Kandyan to be awarded a knighthood.

Jayampathy Charitha Ratwatte was the third son of Sir Cudah Ratwatte Adigar former Mayor of Kandy and Chitravo Katugaha née Kumarihamy. His brothers include Lennie, MBE who was the former Ceylon's High Commissioner in Ghana, Stanley and Kenneth. His cousin was Sirimavo Bandaranaike the first female prime minister in the world.

Ratwatte married Phyllis Sita née Aluwihare, daughter of Sir Richard Aluwihare, the first Ceylonese Inspector General of Police and Lady Lucille Aluwihare. They had three sons: Jayampathy Charitha III (b.1948), Rajitha (b.1960) and Surendra (b. 1962).

== See also ==
- List of political families in Sri Lanka
