= Mahendra Ratwatte =

Sri Lankan politician

Basnayake Nilame of Sri Maha Vishnu Devalaya of Kandy & Dedi Munda Devalaya of Aluthnuwara
- Incumbent
- Assumed office December 2015
- Preceded by: Mohan Panabokke

Mayor of Kandy
- In office 17 October 2011 – November 2015
- Preceded by: Sarath Pushpakumara
- Succeeded by: Sena Dissanayake

Personal details
- Party: Sri Lanka Freedom Party
- Other political affiliations: United People's Freedom Alliance
- Relations: Harris Leuke Ratwatte (grandfather)
- Children: Dinuk
- Parent(s): Anuruddha Ratwatte (father); Carman Rangala Ratwatte (mother)
- Education: Trinity College, Kandy

Thushantha Mahendra Ratwatte is a Sri Lankan politician and former Mayor of Kandy. Currently, he serves as the Basnayake Nilame of Sri Maha Vishnu Devalaya of Kandy & Dedi Munda Devalaya of Aluthnuwara. He is the son of former Sri Lankan Deputy Defense Minister Anuruddha Ratwatte.

== Early life ==
Ratwatte was born in Kandy, the second son of General Anuruddha Ratwatte and Carman née Rangala. Ratwatte's father was an acting Diyawadana Nilame, a councillor on the Kandy Municipal Council, and Minister of Power and Energy and Deputy Minister for Defence (1994-2001). His grandfather Harris Leuke Ratwatte was former Diyawadana Nilame of Sri Dalada Maligawa, Kandy. He has two brothers, the eldest Lohan, was a politician and cabinet minister, and the youngest, Chanuka, a businessman. He was educated at Trinity College, Kandy.

== Politics ==
Ratwatte entered active politics representing the Sri Lanka Freedom Party at the 2011 local government elections and was elected to the Kandy Municipal Council, polling 6,948 votes, the highest number of preference votes. He was elected as the 24th Mayor of Kandy, ending the United National Party's 55-year dominance of Council. He resigned the mayoral position in November 2015, in order to contest in the election of Kandy Sri Vishnu Devalaya.

== See also ==
- List of political families in Sri Lanka
