= List of mayors of Kandy =

Mayor of Kandy
- Incumbent; Chandrasiri Wijenayake since 3 June 2025
- Kandy Municipal Council
- Style: His/Her Worship
- Seat: Kandy
- Constituting instrument: Municipal Council Ordinance No. 17 of 1865
- First holder: Sir Cudah Ratwatte
- Deputy: Ruwan Kumara

The mayor of Kandy is the mayor and head of the Kandy Municipal Council, Sri Lanka. The post was created in 1866 when the Kandy Municipal Council was established by the Municipalities Ordinance of 1865. The offices of the mayor are located at the Kandy Town Hall.

Chandrasiri Wijenayake is the current mayor of Kandy, being appointed on 3 June 2025.

== List of mayors ==
Parties

United National Party Sri Lanka Freedom Party National People's Power Independent

Name	Party	Term of office	Notes	Ref
Sir Cudah Ratwatte	Independent	1939–1940	First elected mayor of Kandy, died in office	
Allan Morley Spaar	Independent	1940–1942		
Naganather Canaganayagam	Independent	1942	First Tamil mayor	
Bennet Soysa	Independent	1943–1944		
A. S. Karunaratna	Independent	1945		
Victor M. Guruswamy	Independent	1946		
Fredrick de Silva	United National Party	1947	Member of Parliament for Kandy (1954–57) and Ambassador to France (1968–71)	
A. C. L. Ratwatte	United National Party	1948		
Bennet Soysa	United National Party	1949		
E. L. Senanayake	United National Party	1950–1954	Speaker of the Sri Lankan Parliament and Governor of North Central Province and Central Province	
Bennet Soysa	United National Party	1954–1956	Member of the State Council and the Senate of Ceylon	
E. L. Senanayake	United National Party	1956–1960		
Bennet Soysa	United National Party	1961–1962		
Noel Wimalasena	United National Party	1963		
E. L. Senanayake	United National Party	1964–1968		
Sir Bennet Soysa	United National Party	1968–1970		
Tilak Ratnayake	United National Party	1979–1990	Governor of Uva Province (1990–1993)	
Chandra Ranaraja	United National Party	1990–1991	First female mayor	
Don Edmund Pathirana	United National Party	1991–1997		
Harindra Dunuwille	United National Party	1997–2002	Member of Parliament (1989–94) and served as the Deputy Minister of State for Constitutional Affairs	
Kesera Senanayake	United National Party	2002–2006	Son of E. L. Senanayake	
Loku Banda Aluvihare	United National Party	2006–2010	Suspended and dismissed by the Minister for Local Government in 2010	
Rajapathiranalage Sarath Pushpakumara	United National Party	2010–2011	Appointed by the UNP, replacing L. B. Aluvihare	
Mahendra Ratwatte	Sri Lanka Freedom Party	2011–2015	Resigned to take on the role of Basnayake Nilame of the Kandy Sri Vishnu Devala	
Sena Dissanayake	Sri Lanka Freedom Party	2015–2018		
Kesera Senanayake	United National Party	2018–2024		
Chandrasiri Wijenayake	National People's Power	2025–present		
