= Shroff =

Shroff is a surname. The word is derived from the Hindustani word saraf (bullion merchant, Baniya), which in turn, is ultimately derived from the Arabic ṣarrāf. The word is also used to mean a cashier, especially in a car park or identity card, car licensing offices and public service agents in East Asia, and a money changer or banker in South Asia. In Hong Kong a shroff may be a place to conduct payments. In 2016 the word "shroff" became a part of the Oxford English Dictionary.

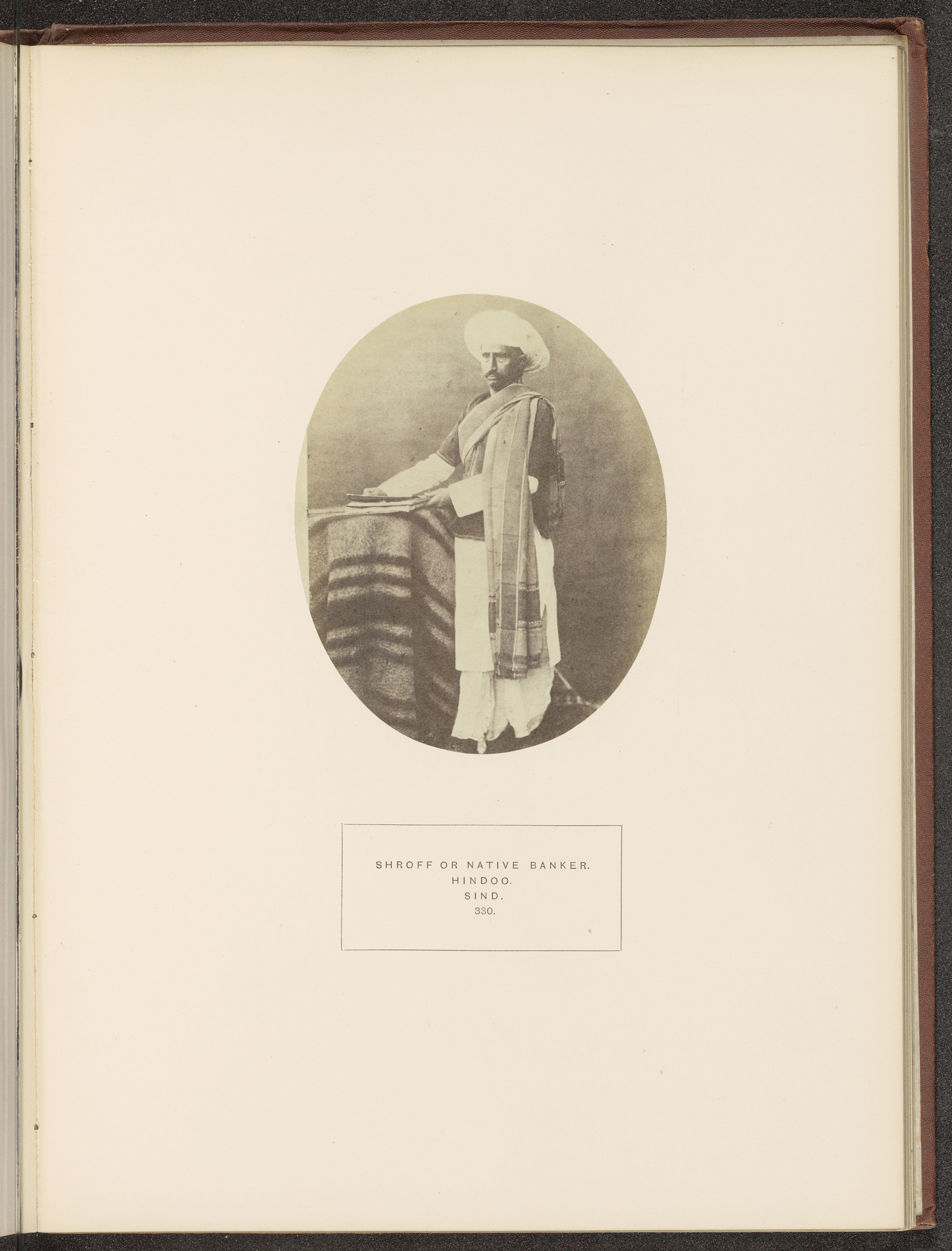
Portrait of Shroff banker in Sindh

== List of people with surname Shroff ==
- Anaita Shroff Adajania (born 1972), Indian fashion stylist
- Anish Shroff, American anchor for ESPNews since 2008
- Ardeshir Darabshaw Shroff (1899–1965), Indian industrialist, banker and economist
- Boman Shroff, Indian actor, stuntman, director, writer, producer
- Esmayeel Shroff (born 1960), Indian film director and writer
- Jackie Shroff (born 1957), Indian actor
- Marie Shroff (born 1944), New Zealand public servant
- Pervin Shroff, Indian scientist
- Pesi Shroff (born 1965), Indian jockey
- Rachna Shroff (1979–2026), American doctor and oncologist
- Sachin Shroff (born 1972), Indian actor
- Sahil Shroff, Indian model and actor
- Sunil Shroff, Indian urology and transplant surgeon
- Sunita Shroff, British television presenter and actress
- Tiger Shroff (born 1990), Indian model and actor
- Zenobia Shroff, Indian-American actress

== See also ==
- SARAF
- Sarraf
- Sharaf
