= Kandy Municipal Council =

Municipal Council of Kandy, Sri Lanka

Kandy Municipal Council මහනුවර මහ නගර සභාව கண்டி மாநகர சபை

Type
- Type: Local authority
- Houses: Unicameral
- Term limits: Five years

History
- Founded: 1865

Leadership
- Mayor of Kandy: Chandrasiri Wijenayake, NPP
- Deputy Mayor: Ruwan Kumara, NPP
- Leader of the Opposition: TBD, TBD
- Municipal Commissioner: Amila Nawarathne

Structure
- Seats: 46
- Political groups: Government: NPP (24); Opposition: SJB (11); UNP (6); SB (2); SLPP (1); UNA (1); Ind (1)

Elections
- Voting system: Mixed: 60% First-past-the-post; 40% closed list proportional representation
- Last election: 6 May 2025

Meeting place
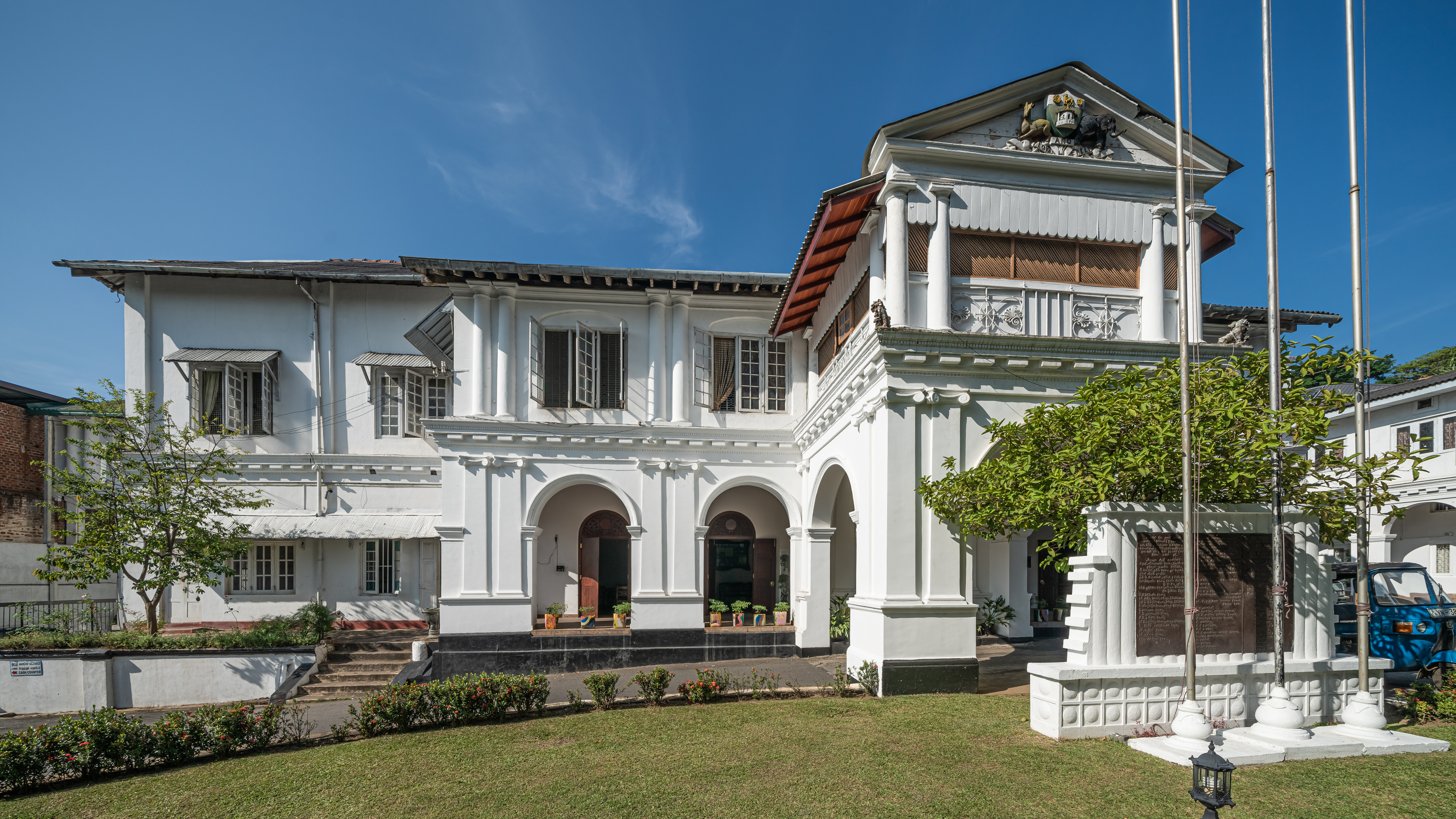
- Kandy Town Hall

Website
- Kandy Municipal Council

The Kandy Municipal Council is the local council for Kandy, the largest city in the Central Province of Sri Lanka. The council was formed under the Municipalities Ordinance of 1865 and first met in 1866. The municipal council is the second oldest and largest local government authority in Sri Lanka. It has 46 elected representatives.

Kandy is a charter city, with a Mayor Council form of government. The Mayor of Kandy and council members are elected through local government elections held once in five years. Head of administration is the Municipal Commissioner, who handles day-to-day operations of the 16 departments that it is made up of.

The Municipal Council provides sewer, road management and waste management services, in case of water, electricity and telephone utility services the council liaises with the Water Supply and Drainage Board, the Ceylon Electricity Board and telephone service providers.

For much of its existence, the council was dominated by the centre-right United National Party. Only between 2011–2015 and since 2025 was the council controlled by another party.

== Structure ==
In 2025, the number of seats of the council was increased to 46 and the National People's Power became the ruling party following the local government elections that year.

Political party	Council members							
Political party	1991	1997	2002	2006	2011	2018	2025	
NPP (Note: As JVP in 1997, 2002, 2006, 2011 and 2018.)	–	–	1	2	–	2	24	24 / 46
SJB	–	–	–	–	–	–	11	11 / 46
UNP	13	13	17	14	10	19	6	6 / 46
SB	–	–	–	–	–	–	2	2 / 46
SLPP	–	–	–	–	–	16	1	1 / 46
UNA	–	–	–	–	–	–	1	1 / 46
Ind	–	–	1	–	–	–	1	1 / 46
UPFA (Note: As SLFP in 1991 and as PA in 1997, 2002 and 2025.)	11	10	5	8	13	3	–	
UPA	–	–	–	–	–	1	–	
SLMC	–	–	–	–	1	–	–	
MEP	–	1	–	–	–	–	–	
Total	24	24	24	24	24	41	46	

== Wards ==
For electoral and administrative purposes, the council is divided into 22 wards.

1. Yatiwawala (යටිවාවල)
2. Senkadagala (සෙංකඩගල)
3. Galewatta (ගාලේවත්ත)
4. Mavilmada (මාවිල්මඩ)
5. Mahaweli Uyana (මහවැලිඋයන)
6. Watapuluwa (වටපුළුව)
7. Wattarantenna (වට්ටාරන්තැන්න)
8. Mapanawatura (මාපනාවතුර)
9. Anniwatta Dodamwala (අනිවත්ත දොඩම්වල)
10. Asgiriya (අස්ගිරිය)
11. Poornawatte West (පූර්ණවත්ත බටහිර)
12. Mahaiyawa (මහයියාව)
13. Aruppola (අරුප්පල)
14. Buwelikada (බූවැලිකඩ)
15. Ampitiya (අම්පිටිය)
16. Malwatta (මල්වත්ත)
17. Deiyannewela (දෙයියන්නේවල)
18. Katukale (කටුකැලේ)
19. Suduhumpola (සුදුහුම්පොල)
20. Mulgampola (මුල්ගම්පල)
21. Bowala (බෝවල)
22. Gatambe (ගැටඹේ)

== Election results ==
=== 2025 local government election ===
Results of the local government elections held on 6 May 2025.

Alliances and parties	Votes	%	Seats			
Alliances and parties	Votes	%	Ward	PR	Total	+/-
National People's Power	21,566	46.38%	24	0	24	▲22
Samagi Jana Balawegaya	12,906	27.76%	1	10	11	▲11
United National Party	6,257	13.46%	0	6	6	▼13
Sarvajana Balaya	1,836	3.95%	0	2	2	▲2
Sri Lanka Podujana Peramuna	1,497	3.22%	0	1	1	▼15
United National Alliance	999	2.15%	0	1	1	▲1
Independent Group 2	587	1.68%	0	1	1	▲1
Independent Group 1	374	0.80%	0	0	0	Steady
United Republican Front	254	0.55%	0	0	0	Steady
Total	46,499	100.00%	25	21	46	▲5
Valid votes	46,499	97.77%				
Rejected votes	1,059	2.23%				
Total votes	47,558	100.00%				
Registered voters/turnout	85,000	55.95%				

=== 2018 local government election ===
Results of the local government elections held on 10 February 2018.

Alliances and parties	Votes	%	Seats			
Alliances and parties	Votes	%	Ward	PR	Total	+/-
United National Party	26,798	44.88%	14	5	19	▲9
Sri Lanka Podujana Peramuna	23,300	39.02%	11	5	16	▲16
United People's Freedom Alliance	4,486	7.51%	0	3	3	▼10
Janatha Vimukthi Peramuna	3,144	5.27%	0	2	2	▲2
United Progressive Alliance	1,982	3.32%	0	1	1	▲1
Total	59,710	100.00%	25	16	41	▲17
Valid votes	59,710	97.70%				
Rejected votes	1,408	2.30%				
Total votes	61,118	100.00%				
Registered voters/turnout	81,296	75.18%				

=== 2011 local government election ===
Results of the local government elections held in 2011.

Alliances and parties	Votes	%	Seats	+/-
United People's Freedom Alliance	23,189	49.78%	13	▲5
United National Party	20,087	43.12%	10	▼4
Sri Lanka Muslim Congress	1,248	2.68%	1	▲1
Janatha Vimukthi Peramuna	746	1.60%	0	▼2
Independent Group 4	711	1.53%	0	Steady
Okkoma Wasiyo Okkoma Rajawaru Sanvidanaya	233	0.50%	0	Steady
Independent Group 1	228	0.49%	0	Steady
United Socialist Party	99	0.21%	0	Steady
Independent Group 2	18	0.04%	0	Steady
Patriotic National Front	10	0.02%	0	Steady
Independent Group 5	8	0.02%	0	Steady
Independent Group 3	2	0.00%	0	Steady
Valid Votes	46,579	97.36%	24	Steady
Rejected Votes	1,265			
Total Polled	47,844			
Registered Electors	74,073			
Turnout	64.14%			

=== 2006 local government election ===
Results of the local government elections held in 2006.

Alliances and parties	Votes	%	Seats	+/-
United National Party	21,963	53.32%	14	▼3
United People's Freedom Alliance	15,164	36.81%	8	▲3
Janatha Vimukthi Peramuna	2,858	6.94%	2	▲1
Jathika Hela Urumaya	825	2.00%	0	Steady
Democratic Unity Alliance	162	0.39%	0	Steady
National Development Front	145	0.35%	0	Steady
Independent Group 1	68	0.17%	0	Steady
Independent Group 2	5	0.01%	0	Steady
Valid Votes	41,190	96.77%	24	Steady
Rejected Votes	1,374			
Total Polled	42,564			
Registered Electors	69,601			
Turnout	61.15%			

=== 2002 local government election ===
Results of the local government elections held on 20 March 2002.

Alliances and parties	Votes	%	Seats	+/-
United National Party	29,241	68.88%	17	▲4
People's Alliance	10,324	24.32%	5	▼5
Janatha Vimukthi Peramuna	1,436	3.38%	1	▲1
Independent Group 2	955	2.25%	1	▲1
Sinhala Urumaya	340	0.80%	0	Steady
New Left Front	95	0.22%	0	Steady
National Development Front	52	0.12%	0	Steady
Independent Group 1	10	0.02%	0	Steady
Valid Votes	42,453	96.55%	24	Steady
Rejected Votes	1,517			
Total Polled	43,970			
Registered Electors	65,432			
Turnout	67.20%			

== See also ==
- Municipal councils of Sri Lanka
