= List of St. Anthony's College, Kandy alumni =

This is a list of St. Anthony’s College alumni, of the St. Anthony’s College, Kandy, Sri Lanka.

Name	Notability	Reference
R. I. T. Alles	founding principal of D. S. Senanayake College (1967), State Secretary for Ministry of Education (1989–1993)	
M. D. Banda	member of Parliament (Maturata 1947–1960), (Hanguranketha 1960–1965), Polgahawela (1965–1970)	
Muttiah Muralitharan	international cricketer (1991–2012)	
Dappula de Livera	Attorney General of Sri Lanka (2019–present)	
Sajith Fernando	First class cricketer	
Asoka de Silva (judge)	Chief Justice of Sri Lanka (2009–2011)	
Mano Ganesan	member of Parliament (Colombo 2001–2010, 2015–present)	
Mahes Goonatilleke	international test cricket player (1982)	
William Gopallawa	last Governor-General of Ceylon (1962–1972), first President of Sri Lanka (1972–1978)	
Rookantha Gunathilake	musician, singer	
Abdul Cader Shahul Hameed	member of Parliament (1960–1994)	
T. B. Ilangaratne	member of Parliament (Kandy, Galaha, Hewaheta and Kolonnawa 1948–1986)	
Saddha Mangala Sooriyabandara	journalist, media personality, script writer, producer, actor	
Victor Ivan	editor and founder of Ravaya newspaper (1987–2012)	
T. M. Jayaratne	musician, singer	
Kingsley Jayasekera	actor, singer, producer	
Ruwan Kalpage	international test cricket player (1993–1999)	
N. H. Keerthiratne	member of parliament (Kegalle 1947– )	
A. C. M. Lafir	international cricket player (1953–1970)	
A. F. Lafir †	Commanding Officer of the 1st Special Forces Regiment - recipient of Parama Weera Vibhushanaya	
Malik Peiris	pathologist, microbiologist, scientific researcher	
Stanley Peiris	musician	
Bernard Perera	first class cricket player (1980–1983)	
Cyril E. S. Perera	member of Parliament (Colombo North 1952–1956)	
A. H. Sheriffdeen	surgeon, academic	
Canagarayam Suriyakumaran	economist, academic	
Victor Tennekoon	Solicitor General of Ceylon (1965–1967), Chief Justice of Sri Lanka (1974–1977)	
Susith Weerasekara	Deputy Chief of staff of the Sri Lanka Navy (2009–2011), Commandant Sri Lanka Volunteer Naval Force (2011–2012)	
Jayampathy Wickramaratne	National List Member of Parliament (2015–present)	
Piyal Wijetunge	international test cricket player (1993)	
