= T. B. Ilangaratne =

Sri Lankan politician, writer, and dramatist (1913–1992)

Hon. T. B. Ilangaratne

Minister of Finance
- In office 29 May 1963 – 10 June 1964
- Prime Minister: Sirimavo Bandaranaike
- Preceded by: P. B. G. Kalugalla
- Succeeded by: N. M. Perera

Personal details
- Born: Navaratne Rajakaruna Wasala Mudiyanselage Tikiri Bandara Ilangaratne; 27 February 1913 Sri Lanka
- Died: 21 May 1992 (aged 79) Sri Lanka
- Party: Sri Lanka Freedom Party
- Spouse: Tamara Kumari Aludeniya
- Children: 4
- Education: Galagedera Vidyalaya, Galagedera, St. Anthony's College, Kandy
- Occupation: Politician, author, dramatist, actor
- Writing career
- Pen name: T. B. Ilangaratne

Navaratne Rajakaruna Wasala Mudiyanselage Tikiri Bandara Ilangaratne (27 February 1913 – 21 May 1992), popularly known as T. B. Ilangaratne, was a Sri Lankan politician, author, dramatist, and theater actor. He was a Member of Parliament for Kandy, Galaha, Hewaheta and Kolonnawa in Colombo district. He served as the Sri Lankan Cabinet Minister of Labour, Housing, Social Services, Finance, Commerce, Food, Trade and Shipping and in other government positions in a career spanning three decades. He established the Employees' Provident Fund, Ceylon Petroleum Corporation and Sri Lanka Insurance Corporation and the People's Bank while in office. As a writer, Ilangaratne is best known for writing the popular Sinhala-language children's novel Amba Yaluwo (1957).

His novels Tilaka Saha Tilaka, Lasanda and Nedeyo have been adapted as films and Amba Yaluwo was made into a television serial.

== Personal life and education ==
Ilangaratne was born on 27 February 1913 in Hataraliyadda, Ceylon as the fourth of the family's seven children. The family name of the father was 'Navaratne Rajakaruna Wasala Tikiri Mudiyanselage'. According to the surname of the mother party 'Ilangandavunda Mudiyanselage', he used the name 'Ilangaratne' and the full family name of the father party. His father was a well-known general practitioner of traditional ophthalmology. He began attending school in 1917 at Galagedera Vidyalaya and received his secondary education from St. Anthony's College, Kandy. Ilangaratne wrote three plays while in school (Akikaru Putha, Himin Himin and Anda Nanda).

On 4 September 1944 Ilangaratne married Tamara Kumari Aludeniya in Gampola. His wife was elected as the member for Kandy (1949-1952) and Galagedara (1970-1977). They had four children, Sandhya, Rohana, Upeksha and Udaya.

He died on 21 May 1992 at the age of 79.

== Government service ==
Ilangaratne left school after passing the London matriculation exam upon which he opted not to further his studies in London and joined the government service as a clerk in the General Clerical Service. In 1941, he tried his hand at acting, playing King Dhatusena in the play of the same name by Gunasila Witanansa.

== Political career ==
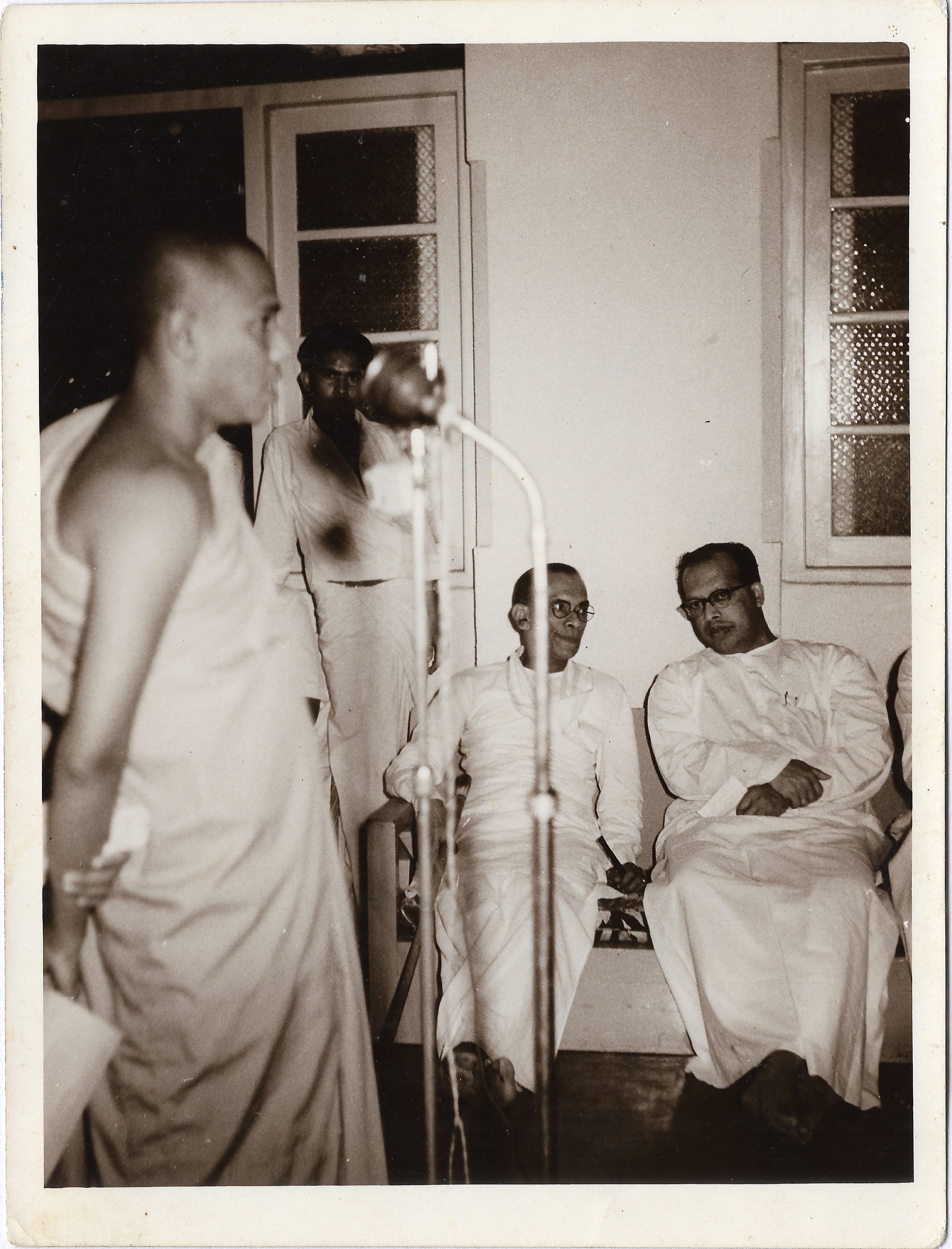
S. W. R. D. Bandaranaike with T. B. Ilangaratne.

In 1947, Ilangaratne left his post in the General Clerical Service and contested the Kandy electorate in the 1947 general election as a socialist candidate, but lost to George E. de Silva of the United National Party. The following year he successfully unseated George de Silva in an election petition that striped him of his civic rights and contested the by-election in the Kandy electorate as an independent socialist candidate defeating de Silva's son Fredrick de Silva, he entered the House of Representatives of Ceylon and was sworn in on 18 May 1948. He soon had to step down due to an election petition that striped him of his civic rights and in the by-election that followed, his wife Tamara Ilangaratne contested and won the Kandy electorate in June 1949. Joining S. W. R. D. Bandaranaike in his newly formed Sri Lanka Freedom Party, Ilangaratne contested the 1956 general election from Galaha and re-entered to the House of Representatives in the landslide victory the Sri Lanka Freedom Party gained defeating Theodore Braybrooke Panabokke. Prime Minister Bandaranaike appointed him to his cabinet as the Minister of Labour, Housing and Social Services. He established the Employees' Provident Fund for the benefit of employees in the private sector and had the Labour day declared. Following the Bandaranaike assassination, Ilangaratne was appointed Minister of Home Affairs by the new Prime Minister W. Dahanayake, serving from September 1959 to December 1959 when he was removed from the cabinet by Dahanayake. He contested and was elected in the general elections of March 1960 and July 1960 from Hewaheta. He was appointed Minister of Commerce, Trade, Food and Shipping by Bandaranaike widow Sirima Bandaranaike who became Prime Minister having led the Sri Lanka Freedom Party in the July election. In his tenor he established the People's Bank, the Ceylon Petroleum Corporation, the government nationalized private insurance companies and formed the Sri Lanka Insurance Corporation and nationalized the Bank of Ceylon.

In 1963, he was appointed Minister of Finance and then Minister of Internal and External Trade in 1964. In 1964, the government nationalized private petroleum companies such as Royal Dutch Shell, transferring its assets to the Ceylon Petroleum Corporation. He lost his seat in the 1965 general election losing to M. A. Daniel from the United National Party. He returned to parliament from a by-election in 1967 from the Kolonnawa electorate and sat in the opposition. He was re-elected in the 1970 general election from Kolonnawa and was appointed to the cabinet with the portfolios of Foreign and Internal Trade, thereafter Trade and Public Administration and Home Affairs. In 1974 he served as acting prime minister. Ilangaratne retired from politics on 12 April 1986.

== Drama career ==
Ilangaratne first published a play called Haramitiya. Since then, he made the plays Manthari Hamuduruwo, Nataka Ata, Mokada Mudalali and Nikan Awa. He also produced the play based on W. A. Silva's novel Radala Piliruwa. Later, when the novel was made into a film, he had to write the screenplay as well. After the failure in politics in 1948, he was later introduced to film producer K. Gunaratnam by his friend lawyer S. Nadesan. Then he went to India in 1953 for filming and later got the opportunity to act in the film Warada Kageda. Critics pointed out that Ilangaratne's innovative acting is due to the politics and satirical dialogue that accompanies the success of the film.

After the success of the film, he was then involved in the film Radala Piliruwa. He wrote the screenplay in the film and also played a minor role. In 1973, he wrote the screenplay of Titus Thotawatte's film Mangala.

== Bibliography ==
- Amba Yaluwo
- Shishyathwaya
- Wilambeetha
- Thilaka
- Nodaruwo saha daruwo
- Nayana
- Lokanthaya
- Mangala
- Mangala Poruwa
- Delowa sihina
- Ambalama
- Malsarava
- Vilasithavo
- Nadayo
- Yugayaka Gamana
- Asitha saha winitha
- Nedeyo
- Thilaka Ha Thilaka
- Hapana

== See also ==
- St. Anthony's College, Kandy
- List of political families in Sri Lanka
