= Premachandra =

Premachandra (Sinhala: ප්‍රේමචන්ද්‍ර, romanized: Prēmacandra) is a Sinhalese surname. Notable people with the surname include:

- Anuki Premachandra, Sri Lankan social activist
- Appunidage Premachandra (born 1953), Sri Lankan sprinter
- Bharatha Lakshman Premachandra (1955–2011), Sri Lankan politician
- Dandeniya Premachandra de Silva, Ceylonese cricketer
- Gihan Premachandra (born 1980), Sri Lankan cricketer
- G. M. Premachandra (1940–1994), Sri Lanka politician
- Hirunika Premachandra (born 1987), Sri Lankan politician
- H. R. U. Premachandra (1910), Ceylonese politician
- P. B. Premachandra (born 1957), Sri Lankan Air Force officer
- Sumudu Premachandra, Sri Lankan judge of the Court of Appeal
