= Nugawela (surname) =

Nugawela (Sinhala: නුගවෙල, romanized: Nugavela) is a Sinhalese surname. Notable people with the surname include:

- Alan Nugawela (died 2007), Sri Lankan army officer, planter and company director
- Derrick Nugawela, Sri Lankan army officer, planter and banker
- E. A. Nugawela (1898–1972), Sri Lankan army officer, lawyer, politician and cabinet minister
- Punchi Banda Nugawela, Ceylonese colonial-era legislator and Diyawadana Nilame (1916–1937)

== See also ==
- Nugawela (disambiguation)
