= Theodore Braybrooke Panabokke =

Sri Lankan politician (1909–1989)

Hon. Theodore Braybrooke Panabokke

Member of Parliament for Galaha
- In office 1947–1956
- Preceded by: Constituency created
- Succeeded by: T. B. Ilangaratne

High Commissioner to India
- In office 1978–1982
- Prime Minister: J. R. Jayewardene
- Preceded by: Arthur Basnayake
- Succeeded by: Bernard Tilakaratna

Chancellor University of Peradeniya
- In office 1 February 1984 – 1989
- Preceded by: Victor Tennekoon
- Succeeded by: Fredrick de Silva

Personal details
- Born: 11 May 1909 Gampola, Ceylon
- Died: 1989 (aged 80) Sri Lanka
- Party: United National Party
- Spouse: Somawathie née Nugapitiya
- Children: two daughters
- Education: Royal College Colombo, Colombo Law College
- Occupation: lawyer, politician, businessman, diplomat

Theodore Braybrooke Panabokke (11 May 1909 – 1989) was a Sri Lankan politician, lawyer and diplomat. He was a former Parliamentary Secretary of Agriculture, Member of Parliament and Ceylon's High Commissioner to India. He was the Chancellor of the University of Peradeniya.

== Early life and education ==
Theodore Braybrooke Panabokke was born on 11 May 1909, the eldest son of Sir Tikiri Bandara Panabokke Adigar, first Minister of Health in the State Council of Ceylon and Mantri Kumarihamy Keppetipola. He was educated at Royal College Colombo and at the Colombo Law College. As his father, he became a Proctor and practiced in Gampola.

== Political career ==
In 1947 he successfully contested the first parliamentary elections as a representative of United National Party in the Galaha electorate. He received 7,638 votes (28% of the total vote) defeating five other candidates. At the 2nd parliamentary election, held in May 1952, he retained his seat, defeating Piyasena Tennakoon by 4,606 votes (securing 48% of the total vote). He was a Member of Parliament from 1947 to 1956 and held the post of Parliamentary secretary to the Minister of Justice in the first Dudley Senanayake cabinet and Parliamentary secretary to the Minister of Agriculture and Food in the Kotelawala cabinet. During this time he was a member of the Kandyan Peasantry Commission and was appointed as Chairman of the People’s Bank in 1965. At the 3rd parliamentary election held in April 1956, he was defeated by the Sri Lanka Freedom Party nominee, T. B. Ilangaratne, 6,434 votes, only receiving 38% of the total vote, as opposed to Ilangaratne's 61%.

From 1976 to 1977 he was the Chairman of the Board of Directors of the Sri Lanka Freedom from Hunger Campaign. In 1978 he was appointed High Commissioner to India and served till 1982, thus becoming the only father-son pair to hold the post. From 1984 to 1986 he was Chairman of the Nation Builders’ Association.

He was appointed Chancellor of the University of Peradeniya in 1984 and held office until his death in 1989.

== Family ==
Panabokke married Somawathie Nugapitiya, daughter of Kuda Banda Nugapitiya in 1939 and they had two daughters. His home was Elpitiya Walauwa in Gampola.

== See also ==
- Sri Lankan Non Career Diplomats
