= C. A. S. Marikkar =

Sri Lankan politician (1911–1970)

Hon. C. A. S. Marikkar
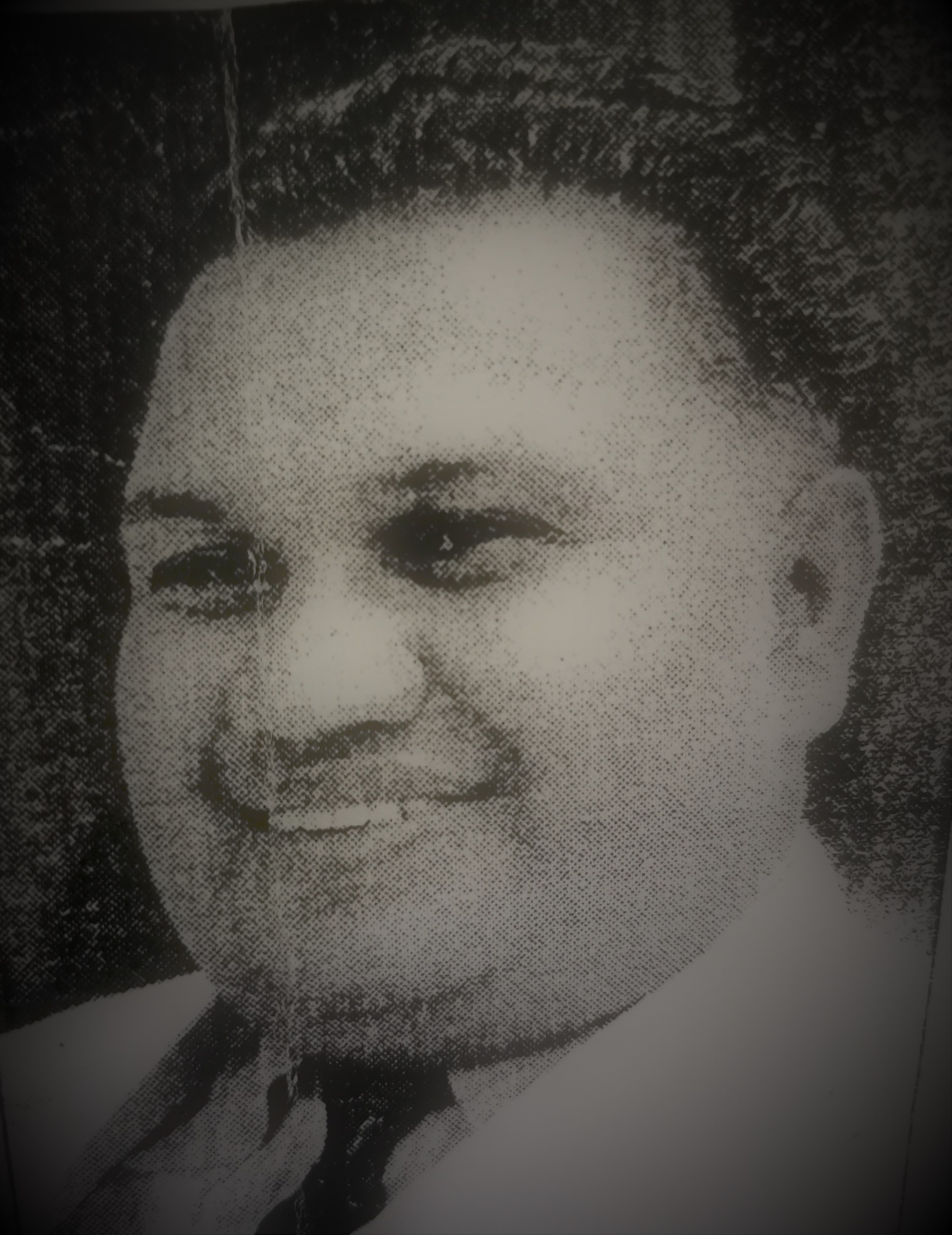

Minister for Post, Broadcasting and Communication
- In office 12 April 1956 – 6 January 1960
- Monarch: Elizabeth II
- Preceded by: S. Natesan
- Succeeded by: Montague Jayawickrama

Member of the Ceylon Parliament for Kadugannawa
- In office April 1952 – 5 December 1959
- Preceded by: H. R. U. Premachandra
- Succeeded by: Constituency Abolished

Member of Parliament for Galagedara
- In office March 1960 – July 1960
- Preceded by: Constituency Created
- Succeeded by: K. Abdul Jabbar

Personal details
- Born: 5 June 1911 Hewaheta, Ceylon
- Died: 18 November 1970 (aged 59) Kandy, Ceylon
- Party: Ceylon National Congress; Sri Lanka Freedom Party
- Education: Dharmaraja College Kandy, Ceylon Law College
- Occupation: Politician
- Nickname: Sinhala Marikkar

Casila Abdul Samed "Sinhala" Marikkar (5 July 1911 – 18 November 1970) was a Sri Lankan politician. He served as Minister for Post, Broadcasting and Communication from 1956 until 1960 and Minister of Cultural affairs from 1956 to 1960 in the S. W. R. D. Bandaranaike cabinet and Dahanayake cabinet. He was a member of parliament representing the Sri Lanka Freedom Party (SLFP) from Kadugannawa. and along with his brother CAC Marikar, we're founder members of the SLFP.

== Early life and education ==
Marikkar was born in the village of Hewaheta in the Central Province of Ceylon to P. C. Marikar, a businessman, and Mohideen Natchiya Marikar from Udadeniya Madige. He received his primary education under Rev. Heenatiyana Seelarathna Thera at the Sri Abhayaraja Pirivena in Kadugannawa. Then he moved to Dharmaraja College Kandy for his secondary education. Marikkar went on to study law at the Ceylon Law College, in Colombo.

== Political career ==
Petitioning against the Queen Elizabeth visit 1954 Upon the coronation of the Queen in 1953 Marikar vehemently disregarded DS Senanayakes plan to send a troop of soldier to England for the parade. Marikar did not want the country to be waisting the money of the people on a coronation after the island was considered independent.

When the Queen visited Ceylon in 1954 CAC Marikar and Henry Abeywickrama collected 1 million petitions to stop her visit. The governor General of Ceylon Herwald Ramsbotham had both these men house arrested until the queen left the country.

Marikar and Henry Abeywickrama are the only politicians to have openly acted out against the monarch.

Joining the Ceylon National Congress, Marikkar first contested the 1947 general election from Galaha and came fourth. He joined the Sri Lanka Freedom Party at its formation in 1951 along with his brother, A. C Marikar. He contested the 1952 general election from Kadugannawa representing the Sri Lanka Freedom Party and was elected to parliament as the second member from Kadugannawa.

=== Minister of Post, Broadcasting and Communication ===
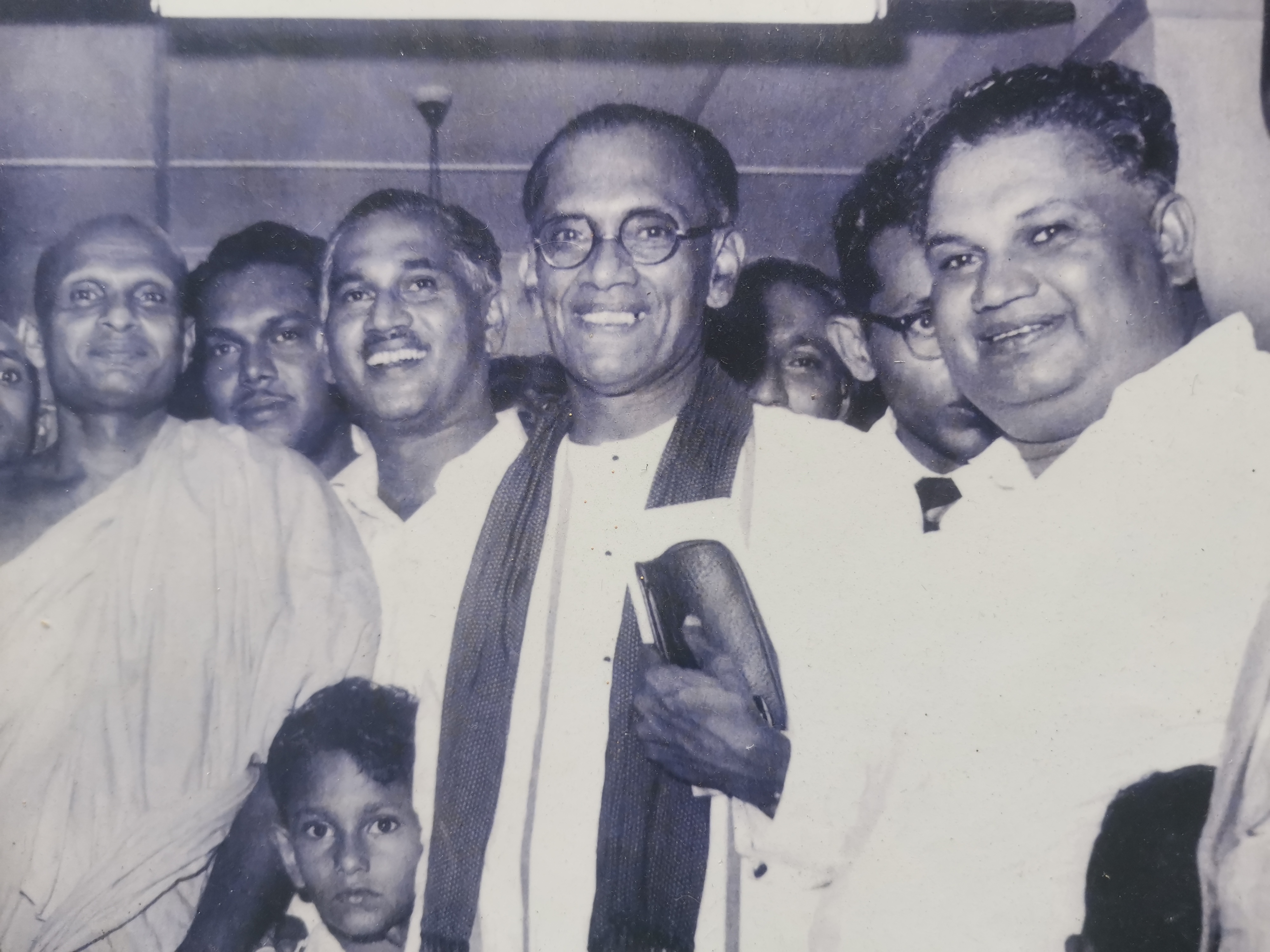
The Marikar brothers with S.W.R.D Bandaranayake

As a gifted orator, he was instrumental in the Sri Lanka Freedom Party's victory at the 1956 general election, working the crowds before public appearances of party chief, S. W. R. D. Bandaranaike. He contested the election in the seat of Kadugannwa and was elected the first member for the electorate receiving 42,982 votes (41% of the total vote). Prime Minister Bandaranaike appointed Marikkar to his cabinet as the Minister for Post, Broadcasting and Communication. In his ministerial role he recommended that Bandaranaike to censor Voice of America transmissions into Ceylon. In 1959 he rode to a party convention on the back of an elephant, creating a diversion from those that were gathered to criticise the Bandaranaike government.

In September 1959, Bandaranayake was assassinated, following which he continued his role in the cabinet of the caretaker Prime Minister W. Dahanayake. In December following the dismissal of several ministers, Marikkar received the additional portfolios of Cultural Affairs and Social Services. Following the Delimitation Commission's decision to divide the Kadugannawa electorate he nominated for the seat of Galagedara. On 4 January 1960, he was dismissed from cabinet with five other ministers who had given nominations from the Sri Lanka Freedom Party. Marikkar was elected at the March 1960 general election, as the member for Galagedara accumulating 4,493 votes. Marikar did not contest the subsequent general elections in July as he was not in favour of Sirimavo Bandaranaike leading the party.

=== Walter Thalagodapitiya Commission ===
Prior to Bandaranayake's death, on 11 September 1959, the Governor General of Ceylon Sir Oliver Goonetilleke appointed a Commission of Inquiry consisting of Walter Thalgodapitiya, Thomas Webb Roberts and Samuel John Charles Schokman. The Thalagodapitiya Commission terms of reference were to inquire into allegations of bribery and corruption against members of parliament. The Report of the Parliamentary Bribery Commission (Thalagodapitiya Commission) was tabled on 16 December 1960 and found Marikkar, M. P. de Zoysa, D. B. Monnekulame, Henry Abeywickrema, M. S. Kariapper and Robert Edward Jayatilaka guilty of bribery. Following the 1965 general election, the new national government, revisited the Thalagodapitiya Commission Report and enacted the Imposition Of Civic Disabilities (Special Provisions) Act (No. 14 of 1965) which stripped Marikkar along with de Zoysa, Abeywickrema, Kariapper, Jayatilleke, and Monnekulame of their civic rights for a period of seven years. Marikkar died on 18 November 1970, at the age of 59.
