= Nugawela (disambiguation) =

Nugawela may refer to:

== People ==
- Nugawela (surname), a list of people with the surname

== Places ==
- Nugawela, a village located in the Kandy District of Sri Lanka
- Nugawela Central College, a government-run national school located in Nugawela, Sri Lanka
