= Battle of the Blues (Kandy) =

Annual school cricket competition in Sri Lanka between Trinity and St. Anthony's

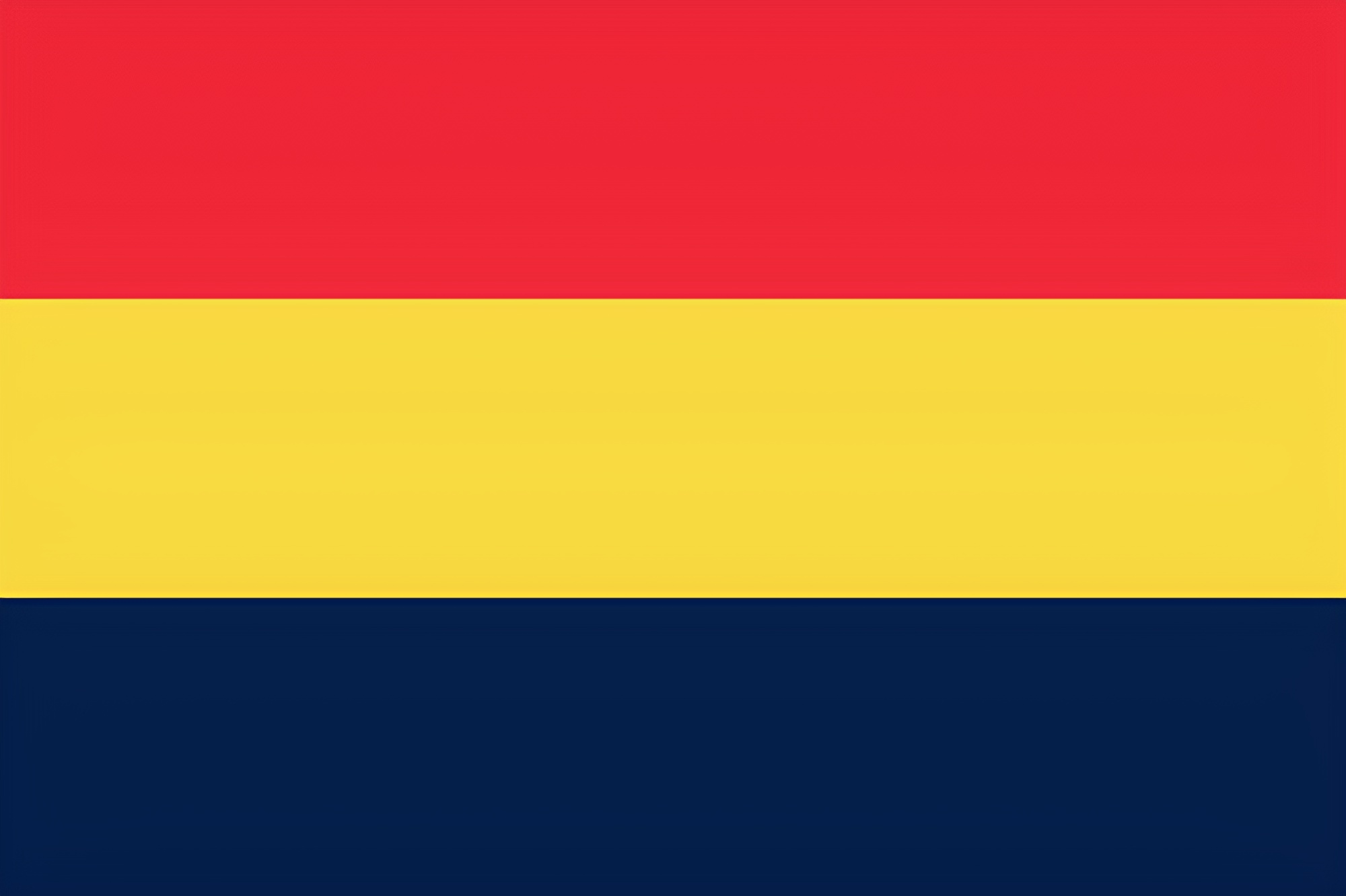
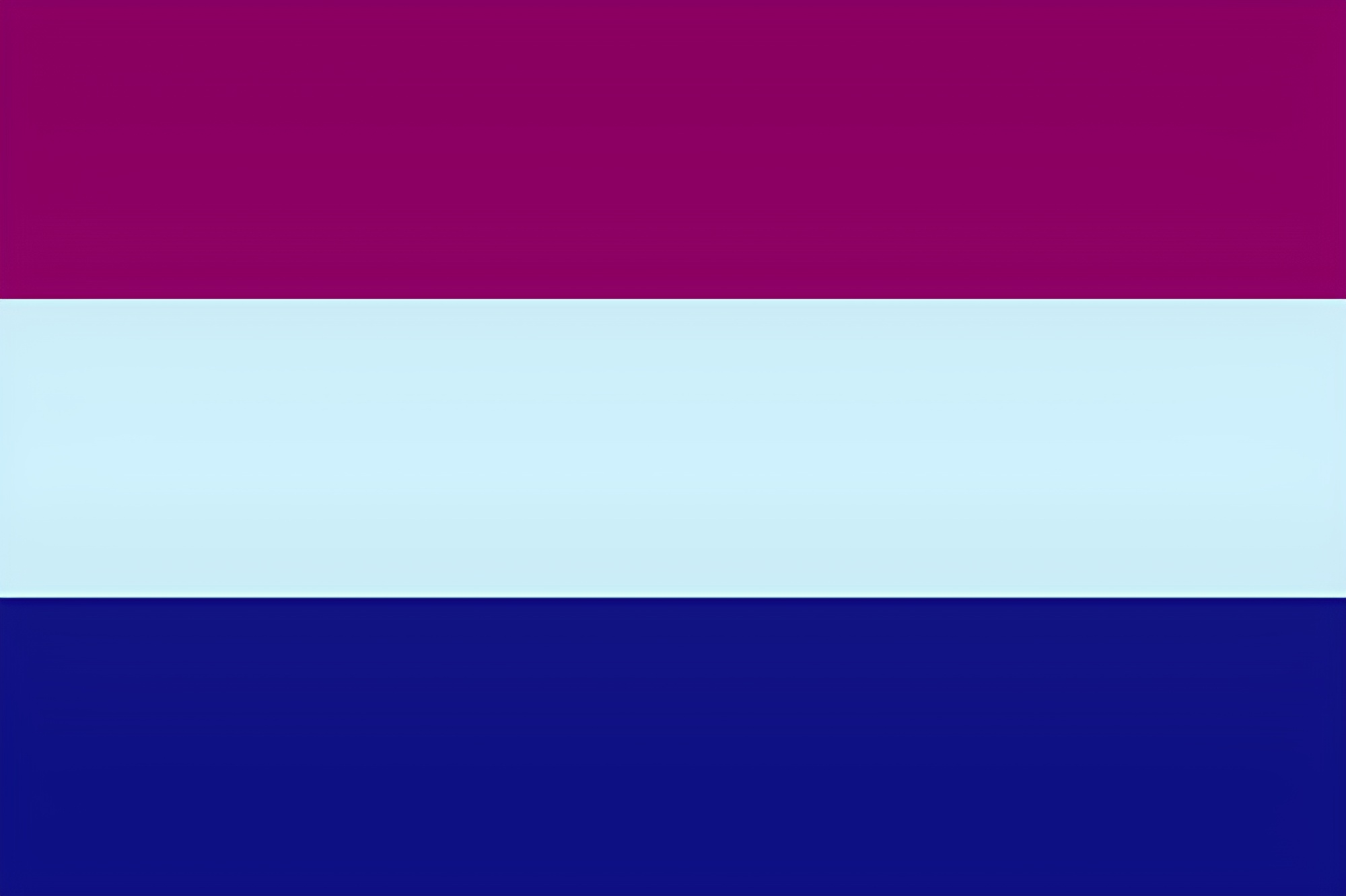
- Trinity College St. Anthony's College
- Sport: Cricket
- First meeting: 1914; 112 years ago: St. Anthony's won by 42 runs
- Latest meeting: 2026: 107th three-day match: Trinity won; 44th limited-overs match: TBD
- Next meeting: 2027
- Stadiums: Asgiriya Stadium; St. Anthony's College Cricket Stadium
- Trophy: John Halangoda Memorial Trophy; Sir Richard Aluwihare Memorial Trophy

Statistics
- Total meetings: 107
- All-time series: Trinity leads, 24–11–72
- Longest win streak: Trinity, 11 (1918–1928)

Location Map
1 Trinity College
2 Asgiriya Stadium
3 St. Anthony's College
4 St. Anthony's College Cricket Stadium

The Battle of the Blues (Kandy), also referred to as the Trinity–Antonian Cricket Encounter or Hill Country Battle of the Blues, stands as the sixth oldest traditional school cricket match, commonly known as a Big Match, held annually in Sri Lanka. Dating back to 1914, this encounter sees Trinity College and St. Anthony's College, engage in a three-day cricket contest. (Note: A two-day encounter from 1914 to 2024, extending to three days from 2025 onwards.) The John Halangoda Memorial Trophy is bestowed upon the victor of the match, determined by either an outright win or, failing that, a first innings triumph. It is noteworthy that a first innings victory does not formally register as a win for the respective team in the records.

Furthermore, following the conclusion of the three-day match, a limited-overs encounter is typically held a week later. This series was inaugurated in 1980 and the winning team is awarded the Sir Richard Aluwihare Trophy.

== History ==
=== 1914 to 1999 ===
Both Trinity and St. Anthony's College embraced cricket as a sporting pursuit during the late 19th century, inaugurating their respective 1st XI programmes soon after. The initial cricket fixtures between the two institutions featured teams consisting of both staff and students. However, these early encounters are not recognised as official 1st XI inter-school matches and are consequently excluded from the schools' overall records.

The first official 1st XI cricket match between the schools was played in March 1914 at the Bogambara Stadium in Kandy with St. Anthony's emerging victorious by 42 runs. C. E. de Silva captained Trinity with C. C. Senaratne captaining St. Anthony's. Trinity won the encounter in 1915 but due to exigencies created from the ongoing World War I, the series was suspended in 1916.

It recommenced in 1917, which was won by St. Anthony's. Trinity went on to record 11 consecutive victories from 1918 to 1928. During the period following the culmination of World War I, St. Anthony's were deprived of their cricket ground and practice pitches due to the British Army occupying the land.

A disagreement between the two schools, regarding the age rule resulted in the cancellation of the encounter in 1956 and 1957.

=== 2000 to present ===
In 2001, the encounter was not contested as Trinity terminated their season early due to disciplinary reasons.

The centenary encounter of the series was held in 2017 with the two schools taking on each other on 10 to 11 March 2017 at the Pallekele International Cricket Stadium in Pallekele.

The matches were postponed and eventually called off in 2020 and 2021 due to the COVID-19 pandemic.

The 106th encounter took place as a three-day match from 3 to 5 April 2025 at St. Anthony's College Cricket Stadium. This marked the first time in its history that the encounter was held over three days.

The 107th encounter, played from 12 to 14 March 2026 at Asgiriya Stadium, was awarded to Trinity College after St. Anthony's players refused to take the field with Trinity needing only one run to win the match outright.

== Trophy ==
In 2005, a tribute was established in memory of John Halangoda, an alumnus of Trinity College who later served as a cricket coach at St. Anthony's. This commemorative trophy, known as the John Halangoda Memorial Trophy, was introduced to honour his legacy. It is awarded to the victorious team at the conclusion of the three-day match.

The victors of the limited overs cricket contest are honoured with the Sir Richard Aluwihare Memorial Trophy. This award pays tribute to the legacy of Sir Richard Aluwihare, the first Ceylonese Inspector General of Police and a veteran of World War I. Aluwihare, an alumnus of Trinity College, was a notable cricketer and served as head prefect during his time at the institution.

== Venue ==
The three-day encounter is alternatively held at Asgiriya Stadium, which is the home ground of Trinity and St. Anthony's College Cricket Stadium, which is the home ground of St. Anthony's. Bogambara Stadium and Pallekele International Cricket Stadium also had been match venues in the past.

The same principle applies to the limited-overs series as well, with the visiting team at a particular year's three-day encounter assuming the role of the host for the subsequent limited overs engagement.

=== Locations and key abbreviations ===
As of 23 March 2024

Venue	First match	Abbreviated as	Location
Bogambara Stadium	1914	Bogambara	7°17′20″N 80°38′08″E
Asgiriya Stadium	1915	Asgiriya	7°18′00″N 80°38′03″E
St. Anthony's College Cricket Stadium	1938	Katugastota	7°19′22″N 80°37′41″E
Pallekele International Cricket Stadium	2017	Pallekele	7°16′51″N 80°43′21″E

== Statistics and results ==
=== Statistics ===
As of 14 March 2026

Two-day matches: 1914–2024 Three-day matches: 2025–present
Played	Won by		Drawn
Played	Trinity	St. Anthony's	Drawn
107	24	11	72

Limited-overs matches: 1980–present
Played	Won by		Tied	No result
Played	Trinity	St. Anthony's	Tied	No result
43	21	17	1	4

=== Results of the last encounter ===
107th three-day match

12–14 March 2026
Report

St. Anthony's	v	Trinity
157 (57.3 overs); S. Attanayake 64* (161); K. Anthony 4/54 (15.3 overs)		264 (82.3 overs); A. Hilmy 125 (178); S. Attanayake 3/41 (13.3 overs)
170 (60.4 overs); K. Kumarasinghe 59 (74); K. Anthony 6/56 (21 overs)		63/1 (5.2 overs); D. Mahavithana 26* (23); D. Weliyanga 1/25 (3 overs)

Trinity awarded the match
Asgiriya Stadium, Kandy
Player of the match: K. Anthony

- Trinity won the toss and elected to field.
- Day 1: St. Anthony's 1st innings 157 (57.3 overs); Trinity 1st innings 66/3 (23 overs). Trinity trailing by 91 runs.
- Day 2: Trinity 1st innings 264 (82.3 overs); St. Anthony's 2nd innings 9/1 (6.4 overs). St. Anthony's trailing by 98 runs. Bad light stopped play.
- Day 3: St. Anthony's 2nd innings 170 (60.4 overs); Trinity 2nd innings 63.1 (5.2 overs). Trinity set a target of 64 runs to win the match. St. Anthony's refused to play. Trinity awarded the match.

44th limited-overs match

TBD

St. Anthony's	v	Trinity

TBD
St. Anthony's College Cricket Stadium, Kandy

== List of fixtures and results ==
- Result denotes which side won the encounter outright, or if it was drawn.
Won by Trinity
Won by St. Anthony's
Match drawn / tied / no result

=== Two-day matches: 1914–1979 ===
As of 6 April 2025

Two-day encounter
Year	Series	Venue	Captains		Result
Year	Series	Venue	Trinity	St. Anthony's	Result
1914	1	Bogambara	C. E. De Silva	C. C. Senaratne	St. Anthony's
1915	2	Asgiriya	R. Ondatje	R. A. D. Joseph	Trinity
1916	Not played				
1917	3	Bogambara	A. Aluwihare	J. M. Ferguson	St. Anthony's (2)
1918	4	Asgiriya	A. H. R. Joseph	J. Anderson	Trinity (2)
1919	5	Bogambara	J. Bandaranayake	R. Wright	Trinity (3)
1920	6	Asgiriya	P. Maralande	L. Joseph	Trinity (4)
1921	7	Bogambara	P. Maralande	L. V. Jayaweera	Trinity (5)
1922	8	Asgiriya	P. Maralande	G. Macky	Trinity (6)
1923	9	Bogambara	V. C. Shockman	C. Bolling	Trinity (7)
1924	10	Asgiriya	V. C. Shockman	C. Coomaraswamy	Trinity (8)
1925	11	Bogambara	H. Delwita	R. Tennant	Trinity (9)
1926	12	Asgiriya	H. Delwita	G. R. S. Baie	Trinity (10)
1927	13	Bogambara	H. Shockman	J. Anandappa	Trinity (11)
1928	14	Asgiriya	J. W. Aiyadurai	A. H. K. Omar	Trinity (12)
1929	15	Bogambara	J. W. Aiyadurai	R. Ratwatte	St. Anthony's (3)
1930	16	Asgiriya	S. Odayar	D. H. Weerasinghe	Trinity (13)
1931	17	Bogambara	S. B. De Saram	W. K. P. Fernando	Trinity (14)
1932	18	Asgiriya	E. W. A. Buultjens	W. K. P. Fernando	Draw
1933	19	Bogambara	E. W. A. Buultjens	T. De Silva	Trinity(15)
1934	20	Asgiriya	B. A. Wijewardena	L. V. Berenger	Draw (2)
1935	21	Bogambara	W. Winter	B. Wettawa	Draw (3)
1936	22	Asgiriya	R. Breckenridge	B. Wettawa	Draw (4)
1937	23	Asgiriya	O. L. Izadeen	B. Wettawa	Draw (5)
1938	24	Katugastota	T. B. Marambe	N. Nugawela	Trinity (16)
1939	25	Asgiriya	G. P. Schoorman	D. Roberts	Trinity (17)
1940	26	Katugastota	R. P. De Alwis	R. Harris	Draw (6)
1941	27	Asgiriya	H. E. W. Solomons	V. Joseph	Draw (7)
1942	28	Katugastota	S. B. Dissanayke	T. K. Hannan	Draw (8)
1943	29	Asgiriya	T. B. Werapitiya	B. Kurera	Draw (9)
1944	30	Katugastota	T. B. Werapitiya	G. Alston	Trinity (18)
1945	31	Asgiriya	A. P. Fernando	M. Zarook	Trinity (19)
1946	32	Katugastota	C. N. Shockman	H. G. Fernando	Draw (10)
1947	33	Asgiriya	C. N. Shockman	L. C. Fernando	Trinity (20)
1948	34	Katugastota	L. V. Wadsworth	L. Pamunuwa	St. Anthony's (4)
1949	35	Asgiriya	L. V. Wadsworth	S. V. A. Samaradasa	Draw (11)
1950	36	Katugastota	L. Kadirgamar	S. Jayasinghe	Draw (12)
1951	37	Asgiriya	E. Rulach	B. Weerakoon	Trinity (21)
1952	38	Katugastota	G. Tennekoon	B. Weerakoon	Draw (13)
1953	39	Asgiriya	A. H. Bandaranayake	H. E. Cooray	Draw (14)
1954	40	Katugastota	A. Hulangamuwa	A. C. M. Lafir	St. Anthony's (5)
1955	41	Asgiriya	H. F. Ratwatte	A. C. M. Lafir	Draw (15)
1956	Not played				
1957	Not played				
1958	42	Katugastota	A. N. Maralande	S. W. Seneviratne	Draw (16)
1959	43	Asgiriya	A. N. Maralande	C. Joseph	Draw (17)
1960	44	Katugastota	J. S. Ratwatte	C. Joseph	Draw (18)
1961	45	Asgiriya	S. A. Silva	H. M. Muthalib	Draw (19)
1962	46	Katugastota	V. I. Kodituwakku	N. Dunuwille	St. Anthony's (6)
1963	47	Asgiriya	S. M. Perera	M. Joseph	Draw (20)
1964	48	Katugastota	M. T. M. Zaruk	M. Macky	Draw (21)
1965	49	Asgiriya	M. T. M. Zaruk	J. Uddukumbura	Draw (22)
1966	50	Katugastota	H. Dunuwille	N. Nagendra	Draw (23)
1967	51	Asgiriya	H. S. Ranaweera	C. Sims	Draw (24)
1968	52	Katugastota	C. M. Amunugama	R. Sims	St. Anthony's (7)
1969	53	Asgiriya	C. N. Dissanayake	R. Sims	Draw (25)
1970	54	Katugastota	N. R. Marambe	M. Guneratne	Draw (26)
1971	55	Asgiriya	J. L. Weerasinghe	M. Goonathilake	Draw (27)
1972	56	Katugastota	A. E. Unantenne	J. Monnekulama	St. Anthony's (8)
1973	57	Asgiriya	R. S. Dissanayke	P. De Silva	Draw (28)
1974	58	Katugastota	A. R. Perera	S. Goonathilake	Draw (29)
1975	59	Asgiriya	A. R. Perera	H. Jayasundara	Draw (30)
1976	60	Katugastota	J. D. D. Weerasinghe	B. Perera	Draw (31)
1977	61	Asgiriya	F. R. R. Arthur	T. Mohamed	Draw (32)
1978	62	Katugastota	A. R. Tissera	R. De La Motte	Draw (33)
1979	63	Asgiriya	P. S. Dinesh	M. Ratnakumar	Draw (34)

=== Two-day and limited-overs matches: 1980–2024 ===
As of 6 April 2025

Two-day encounter						Limited-overs encounter		
Year	Series	Venue	Captains		Result	Series	Venue	Result
Year	Series	Venue	Trinity	St. Anthony's	Result	Series	Venue	Result
1980	64	Katugastota	J. R. Ratnayake	A. Leanage	Draw (35)	1	Asgiriya	St. Anthony's
1981	65	Asgiriya	S. T. B. Ellepola	F. Majeed	St. Anthony's (9)	2	Katugastota	St. Anthony's (2)
1982	66	Katugastota	A. D. P. Yainne	A. Dunuwille	Draw (36)	3	Asgiriya	Trinity
1983	67	Asgiriya	J. S. Mutthumani	M. Von Hagt	Draw (37)	4	Katugastota	St. Anthony's (3)
1984	68	Katugastota	H. C. D. D' Silva	M. Von Hagt	Draw (38)	5	Asgiriya	St. Anthony's (4)
1985	69	Asgiriya	A. U. Aturaliye	A. Wickramasooriya	Draw (39)	6	Katugastota	St. Anthony's (5)
1986	70	Katugastota	T. P. Weerasooriya	R. Perera	Trinity (22)	7	Asgiriya	Trinity (2)
1987	71	Asgiriya	D. R. Madena	D. Nadaraja	Draw (40)	8	Katugastota	St. Anthony's (6)
1988	72	Katugastota	C. I. Fernando	R. Kalpage	Draw (44)	9	Asgiriya	St. Anthony's (7)
1989	73	Asgiriya	D. K. Ratwatte	R. Kalpage	Draw (42)	10	Katugastota	St. Anthony's (8)
1990	74	Katugastota	S. Jayasinghe	S. De Alwis	St. Anthony's (10)	11	Asgiriya	St. Anthony's (9)
1991	75	Asgiriya	Y. S. Goonatilleke	N. Kalpage	Draw (43)	12	Katugastota	Trinity (3)
1992	76	Katugastota	K. C. Edirisinghe	U. De Alwis	St. Anthony's (11)	13	Asgiriya	Trinity (4)
1993	77	Asgiriya	H. M. Goonetileke	M. A. Shafeek	Draw (44)	14	Katugastota	No result
1994	78	Katugastota	T. H. de Silva	I. Galagoda	Draw (45)	15	Asgiriya	St. Anthony's (10)
1995	79	Asgiriya	S. N. Fernando	N. Sirisena	Draw (46)	16	Katugastota	Trinity (5)
1996	80	Katugastota	J. L. B. Seneviratne	S. Mansoor	Draw (47)	17	Asgiriya	Trinity (6)
1997	81	Asgiriya	C. K. Sangakkara	T. Gunaratne	Draw (48)	18	Katugastota	Trinity (7)
1998	82	Katugastota	S. P. Fernando	M. Palihakkara	Draw (49)	19	Asgiriya	Trinity (8)
1999	83	Asgiriya	U. K. Weeraratne	S. Pinnaduwa	Draw (50)	20	Katugastota	St. Anthony's (11)
2000	84	Katugastota	U. K. Weeraratne	N. M. Nizam	Draw (51)	21	Asgiriya	Trinity (9)
2001	Not played							
2002	85	Asgiriya	K. L. R. Gamage	P. Ranawaka	Draw (52)	22	Katugastota	St. Anthony's (12)
2003	86	Katugastota	C. M. Fernando	N. Rathnayake	Draw (53)	23	Asgiriya	No result (2)
2004	87	Asgiriya	C. M. Fernando	M. Rizlan	Draw (54)	24	Katugastota	St. Anthony's (13)
2005	88	Katugastota	R. M. Munaweera	P. Fernando	Draw (55)	25	Asgiriya	St. Anthony's (14)
2006	89	Asgiriya	C. S. Dumbarage	S. Munas	Draw (56)	26	Katugastota	St. Anthony's (15)
2007	90	Katugastota	S. S. Pathirana	S. Jaimon	Draw (57)	27	Asgiriya	Trinity (10)
2008	91	Asgiriya	D. C. Gangoda	G. Dissanayake	Draw (58)	28	Katugastota	No result (3)
2009	92	Katugastota	M. R. Jaleel	S. Palihakkara	Draw (59)	29	Asgiriya	Trinity (11)
2010	93	Asgiriya	M. H. M. Sajid	D. Kumarasinghe	Draw (60)	30	Katugastota	St. Anthony's (16)
2011	94	Katugastota	A. Jayasundara	H. Wickramasekara	Draw (61)	31	Asgiriya	Trinity (12)
2012	95	Asgiriya	D. P. N. Dickwella	K. Ranaraja	Trinity (23)	32	Katugastota	St. Anthony's (17)
2013	96	Katugastota	D. M. Wickramanayake	S. Bulathsinghala	Draw (62)	33	Asgiriya	Trinity (13)
2014	97	Asgiriya	K. R. Chandraguptha	N. Gunasinghe	Draw (63)	34	Katugastota	Tied
2015	98	Katugastota	R. S. Sayer	B. Wijethunga	Draw (64)	35	Asgiriya	Trinity (14)
2016	99	Pallekele	R. S. Sayer	K. Uggalpaya	Draw (65)	36	Katugastota	Trinity (15)
2017	100	Pallekele	S. Shanmuganathan	M. Alfar	Draw (66)	37	Asgiriya	Trinity (16)
2018	101	Asgiriya	E. M. H. R. B. Boyagoda	J. Himsara	Draw (67)	38	Katugastota	Trinity (17)
2019	102	Katugastota	G. G. P. Bandara	T. Gunasinghe	Draw (68)	39	Asgiriya	Trinity (18)
2020	Not played due to COVID-19 pandemic							
2021	Not played due to COVID-19 pandemic							
2022	103	Asgiriya	A. Muthalib	C. Wickremasinghe	Draw (69)	40	Asgiriya	Trinity (19)
2023	104	Katugastota	R. Amarasinghe	L. Abeysinghe	Draw (70)	41	Asgiriya	No result (4)
2024	105	Asgiriya	M. Kularathne	T. Ekanayake	Draw (71)	42	Katugastota	Trinity (20)

=== Three-day and limited-overs matches: 2025–present ===
As of 11 April 2025

Three-day encounter						Limited-overs encounter			Ref.
Year	Series	Venue	Captains		Result	Series	Venue	Result	Ref.
Year	Series	Venue	Trinity	St. Anthony's	Result	Series	Venue	Result	Ref.
2025	106	Katugastota	M. Rathnayake	C. Ekanayake	Draw (72)	43	Asgiriya	Trinity (21)	
2026	107	Asgiriya	D. Mahavithana	K. Kumarasinghe	Trinity (24)	Not played			

== Match and series records for the three-day encounter ==
=== Best performances ===
As of 23 March 2024

Best performances: 1914–present
Record	Trinity	St. Anthony's	Ref.
Largest margin of victory by runs	Won by an innings and 120 runs (1939)	Won by an innings and 90 runs (1962)	
Largest margin of victory by wickets	Won by 9 wickets (1927, 1951 and 2026) (Note: Trinity awarded the match in 2026 as St. Anthony's refused to play. Trinity set a target of 64 runs to win was 63/1 in 5.2 overs when the match was stopped.)	Won by 9 wickets (1992)	
Smallest margin of victory by runs	Won by 41 runs (1925)	Won by 42 runs (1914)	
Smallest margin of victory by wickets	Won by 4 wickets (1931)	Won by 6 wickets (1917 and 1981)	
Highest innings total	406/8d (1942)	399/8d (1954)	
Lowest innings total	54 (1990)	27 (1928)	
Most runs in an innings	148 by K. Weeraratne (1999)	176 by A. C. M. Lafir (1954)	
Best bowling figures in an innings	10/38 by S. Fernando (1997) (Note: Achieved a Ten-wicket haul in St. Anthony's second innings)	7/26 by P. Wijetunge (1990)	
Best bowling figures in a match	12/48 by C. Dharmalingam (1939) – 6/17 and 6/13 (Note: Achieved a hat-trick in each innings)	12/81 by S. Fernando (1992) – 6/39 and 6/52	

=== Batting and bowling records ===
As of 14 March 2026

Most runs in an innings
Total number of centuries: 33: Trinity: 14; St. Anthony's: 19
Player	Runs	School	Year
A. C. M. Lafir	176	St. Anthony's	1954
R. Burke	165	St. Anthony's	1965
B. Perera	155*	St. Anthony's	1976
P. de Silva	148	St. Anthony's	1973
K. Weeraratne	148	Trinity	1999
T. B. Werapitiya	143	Trinity	1944
K. Kumarasinghe	136	St. Anthony's	2025
F. Burke	133*	St. Anthony's	1962
N. Dambawinne	130	Trinity	1978
C. Wickremasinghe	128	St. Anthony's	2019
C. Joseph	127	St. Anthony's	1960
A. Hilmy	125	Trinity	2026
M. Von Hagt	123	St. Anthony's	1984
M. D. D. Jayawardena	120	Trinity	1922
S. Wijesooriya	114*	Trinity	2009
A. Wickremasuriya	114	St. Anthony's	1984
J. Anderson	111	St. Anthony's	1918
L. C. de Mel	111	Trinity	1923
L. Ramanayake	110	Trinity	1970
R. Stephens	108	St. Anthony's	1952
K. Uggalpaya	108	St. Anthony's	2016
M. Dunuwille	106*	St. Anthony's	1970
P. Thilakarathne	106	Trinity	2025
R. Stephens	103	St. Anthony's	1954
J. S. Ratwatte	103	Trinity	1960
D. Witharane	103	St. Anthony's	1996
M. T. M. Zaruk	101*	Trinity	1964
R. N. R. de Silva	100*	Trinity	1971
N. Kalpage	100*	St. Anthony's	1990
T. B. Werapitiya	100	Trinity	1943
S. W. Seneviratne	100	Trinity	1958
W. Seneviratne	100	St. Anthony's	1964
R. Sims	100	St. Anthony's	1969

Best bowling figures in a match
Total number of ten-wicket hauls: 11: Trinity: 5; St. Anthony's: 6
Player	Wickets	School	Year
C. Dharmalingam	12/48 (6/17 and 6/31)	Trinity	1939
S. Fernando	12/81 (6/39 and 6/52)	St. Anthony's	1992
M. Muralitharan	12/94 (6/58 and 6/36)	St. Anthony's	1991
T. O. M. Deen	11/60 (5/29 and 6/31)	St. Anthony's	1953
S. Fernando	11/69 (1/31 and 10/38)	Trinity	1997
P. Fernando	11/103 (5/60 and 6/43)	St. Anthony's	1981
P. Wijetunge	10/39 (7/26 and 3/13)	St. Anthony's	1990
B. Perera	10/49 (4/10 and 6/39)	St. Anthony's	1972
E. W. A. Buultjens	10/78 (3/26 and 7/52)	Trinity	1932
G. B. Perera	10/82 (5/63 and 5/19)	Trinity	1942
K. Anthony	10/110 (4/54 and 6/56)	Trinity	2026

== Records for the limited overs series ==
=== Best performances ===
As of 14 March 2026

Best performances: 1980–present
Record	Trinity	St. Anthony's	Ref.
Largest margin of victory by runs	Won by 149 runs (2018)	Won by 160 runs (1983)	
Largest margin of victory by wickets	Won by 9 wickets (2016)	Won by 9 wickets (1990)	
Smallest margin of victory by runs	Won by 2 runs (2011)	Won by 10 runs (2012)	
Smallest margin of victory by wickets	Won by 1 wicket (1991)	Won by 1 wicket (1989)	
Highest innings total	305/7 in 50 overs (2000)	276/5 in 45 overs (1993) and 276/8 in 50 overs (1980)	
Lowest innings total	71 in 25.5 overs (1983)	89 in 31 overs (2016)	
Most runs in an innings	109 by H. Boyagoda (2018)	139 by M. Von Hagt (1983)	
Best bowling figures in an innings	6/23 by A. Anandakumar (2019)	5/24 by K. Ekanayake (2007)	

=== Batting and bowling records ===
As of 23 March 2024

Most runs in an innings
Total number of centuries: 5: Trinity: 1; St. Anthony's: 4
Player	Runs	School	Year
M. Von Hagt	139	St. Anthony's	1983
A. Shafeek	123	St.Anthony's	1993
M. Von Hagt	111	St. Anthony's	1981
H. Boyagoda	109	Trinity	2018
K. Uggalpaya	102	St. Anthony's	2015

Best bowling figures in an innings
Total number of five-wicket hauls: 6: Trinity: 4; St. Anthony's: 2
Player	Wickets	School	Year
A. Anandakumar	6/23	Trinity	2019
K. Ekanayake	5/24	St. Anthony's	2007
T. Ekanayake	5/29	St. Anthony's	2024
A. Srimahan	5/32	Trinity	2013
S. Perera	5/49	Trinity	1980
S. Pathirana	5/52	Trinity	2007

== Notes ==
Sources

- Laphir, Afzal (20 April 2023). "Trinity–Antonian Encounters – A Statistical Analysis". Quadrangle. Archived from the original on 17 March 2024.
- Laphir, Afzal (28 April 2023). "The Trinity–Antonian Limited Overs Series in Numbers". Quadrangle. Archived from the original on 17 March 2024.
- "Centenary Number, Trinity College, Kandy, 1872–1972" (PDF). noolaham.net. 17 March 1972. Archived from the original (PDF) on 8 August 2024.
- "The Trinity Story 1872–2022". history.trinitycollege.lk. 12 February 2024. Archived from the original on 13 May 2025.
