= Canagarayam Suriyakumaran =

Sri Lankan environmentalist and professor

Professor Canaganayagam Suriyakumaran
- Born: 1922; Sri Lanka
- Died: 2006 (aged 83–84)
- Citizenship: Sri Lankan
- Education: St. Anthony's College, Kandy
- Known for: Environmental conservation
- Awards: United Nations Sasakawa World Environment Award
- Scientific career
- Fields: Environmental Science, Economics
- Workplaces: London School of Economics, United Nations

Canagarayam Suriyakumaran (1922–2006) was a Sri Lankan environmentalist and professor. He is a notable economist, a former United Nations civil servant, a specialist in Local Government and Devolution and an Internationalist in Sri Lanka.

== Notable work ==
Prof. Suriyakumaran was instrumental in creating some of the international programs and institutions listed below;

- Represented Sri Lanka in the formation of Asian Development Bank
- Deputy Executive Secretary of the United Nations Economic and Social Commission for Asia and the Pacific
- United Nations Environment Programme's Global Director for Education, Training and Technical Assistance
- Represented Sri Lanka in the formation of Asia-Pacific Trade Agreement, formerly known as Bangkok Trade Agreement
- The Asian Clearing Union
- The Asian Coconut Community
- The United Nations Environment Programme-UNESCO Global Environment Education Programme

== Awards and recognition ==
- Prof. Suriyakumaran was knighted at the end of his United Nations career by His Royal Highness the King of Thailand, at the United Nations' Asian headquarters, for outstanding services to Asia
- He won the United Nations Sasakawa World Environment Prize - 1995

== Publications ==
- The wealth of poor nations New edition. Madras: T.R. Publications (1996).
- The methodology of environment and development management Colombo: Centre for Regional Development Studies (1993).
- Environmental planning for development Colombo: Center for Regional Development Studies (1992)
- "Hinduism" for Hindus and non-Hindus: Its religion and metaphysics Colombo: Dept. of Hindu Religious and Cultural Affairs, Sri Lanka (1990)
- The wealth of poor nations London and New York: Croom Helm. (1984)

== See also ==
- List of St. Anthony's College, Kandy alumni
