= Nugawela =

- Village
- Country: Sri Lanka
- Province: Central Province
- Time zone: UTC+5:30 (Sri Lanka Standard Time)
- Postal code: 20080

Nugawela is a village in Sri Lanka. It is located within Central Province.

== See also ==
- List of towns in Central Province, Sri Lanka
- Punchi Banda Nugawela
- E. A. Nugawela
