= William Clerihew =

Scottish architect

William Clerihew (1811 – 6 March 1870) was a Scottish architect, artist, coffee planter and inventor. He painted and measured the comet with the longest tail recorded, and invented the "Clerihew Store", a device for drying coffee beans, for which he received the Isis Gold Medal.

== Biography ==
Clerihew was born in Aberdeen, to George Clerihew, builder and guild burgess of the city and his wife, Margaret (nee Richardsom). Edmund Clerihew Bentley, the inventor of the Clerihew, the form of poetry, was his nephew. He went to Marischal College, to which his father bequeathed a bursary later.

He became an apprentice architect in 1836 and joined the Royal Institute of British Architects (RIBA) in London as an associate member in 1839. He apparently worked for Charles Parry as a draughtsman on the design of the new houses of Parliament. In 1842 Indian business magnate Dwarkanath Tagore headhunted him to teach Astronomy and Physics to a college of native youth in Bengal.

Clerihew boarded the Justina, bound for Calcutta. In middle of the Indian Ocean, about 600 miles (1000 km) off Ceylon (now Sri Lanka), he observed an extremely bright comet (now identified as “C1843D1”), with the longest tail – estimated at 200-300 million miles (300-500m km) – ever recorded. Clerihew made four drawings of it and measured its altitude and azimuth. He also spotted the comet’s second tail and measured the angle it made with the first. He sent his observations to the astronomer Sir John Frederick William Herschel. The paintings he made of the comet were later presented to the Royal Astronomical Society.

On arrival in Calcutta, he began painting buildings and landscapes. In late 1843 he sailed up the Ganges River to Delhi, painting all the way. By 1846, he was planting coffee in Hewaheta, Ceylon, on "The Hope", the coffee plantation belonging to James Pattle, the father of Julia Margaret Cameron. Here, he was involved in an incident involving an elephant, in which the manager of the neighbouring "Rathoongodde" plantation, John Keane was killed. Julia Margaret Cameron's husband, Charles Hay Cameron, employed Clerihew to manage Rathoongodde, which he owned.

While improving the plantation, Clerihew started work on a new "Swiss Cottage" to replace the rudimentary "planter's bungalow". He also redesigned the "Laborie's Rattletrap", a coffee pulper. Studying the works of Justus von Liebig, he designed his "Clerihew Store", a forced-convection coffee drier, intended to halt the decomposition of the pulped bean. His drier, known as the "Clerihew", became ubiqiuitous in coffee plantations in Ceylon, and engendered modern coffee, tea and grain driers.

In 1851 he accompanied Cameron to Europe, painting scenes in the Middle East on the way. He attended the Great Exhibition, where the Clerihew Store was an exhibit. In 1853, Prince Albert presented him with the Isis Medal for his invention.

He retired to Aberdeen. In 1856, he married Emily Foottit, the 18-year old daughter of the late Rev. James Foottit, of Newark, Nottinghamshire, and had seven children.
