= Rupa Sriyani Daniel =

Sri Lankan politician (born 1951)

Hon. Rupa Sriyani Daniel

Member of Parliament for National List
- In office 15 February 1989 – 24 June 1994

Member of Parliament for Hewaheta
- In office 1982 – 18 April 1982
- Preceded by: M. A. Daniel
- Succeeded by: seat abolished

Personal details
- Born: Rupa Sriyani Daniel; 24 December 1951 (age 74) Thalatuoya, Sri Lanka
- Party: United National Party
- Relations: Mahahitana Arachchige (brother)
- Occupation: Politician

Rupa Sriyani Daniel (born 24 December 1951) was a Sri Lankan politician.

On 18 April 1982 her brother, Mahahitana Arachchige, resigned his seat in parliament, following inquiries relating to his involvement in alleged gold-smuggling activities. Daniel was subsequently appointed by the United National Party as his replacement, and sworn in as the member for Hewaheta on 21 July. At the 1989 Sri Lankan parliamentary election she was appointed as a National List member of parliament, serving from 15 February 1989 until 24 June 1994.

At the 3rd Central provincial council election, held on 6 April 1999, Daniel was elected as one of the United National Party candidates to the Central Province Council. She was re-elected at 4th Central provincial council election, held on 10 July 2004.
