= Lafir =

Lafir is a name belonging to Sri Lankan Moors which is commonly used as a surname in Sri Lanka. It may refer to

== Surname ==
- A. C. M. Lafir (born 1935), Sri Lankan cricketer
- A. F. Lafir (died 1996), Sri Lankan military personnel
- Muhammad Lafir (1930 – 1981), Sri Lankan billiards player
