= Kadugannawa Electoral District =

Former electoral district of Sri Lanka

Kadugannawa electoral district was an electoral district of Sri Lanka between August 1947 and March 1960. The district was named after the town of Kadugannawa in Kandy District, Central Province. The 1978 Constitution of Sri Lanka introduced the proportional representation electoral system for electing members of Parliament. The existing 160 mainly single-member electoral districts were replaced with 22 multi-member electoral districts. Kadugannawa electoral district was replaced by the Kandy multi-member electoral district at the 1989 general elections, the first under the proportional representation system. The Kadugannawa electoral district was one of three multi-member constituencies, with two members, the others were Colombo Central and Balangoda.

== Members of Parliament ==
Key

Independent SLFP UNP

Election	Member 1	Party	Term	Member 2	Party	Term
1947	E. A. Nugawela	UNP	1947 - 1956	H. R. U. Premachandra		1947-1952
1952	E. A. Nugawela	UNP	1947 - 1956	C. A. S. Marikkar	SLFP	1952 -1956
1956	C. A. S. Marikkar	SLFP	1956 - 1960	L. S. Jinasena	UNP	1956 -1960

== Elections ==
=== 1947 Parliamentary General Election ===
Results of the 1st parliamentary election held between 23 August 1947 and 20 September 1947:

Candidate	Party	Symbol	Votes	%
E. A. Nugawela	United National Party	Scales	26,147	30.82
H. R. U. Premachandra	United National Party	Key	16,854	19.87
S. A. Rajapaksa		Spoon	11,268	13.28
V. H. Gunasekera		House	7,682	9.06
J. N. Jinendradasa		Lamp	7,497	8.84
H. B. Nikatenne		Star	5,170	6.10
P. B. Ranaraja		Umbrella	2,094	2.47
M. B. W. Siri Walgampaya		Chair	1,827	2.15
T. B. Tennakoon		Elephant	1,674	1.97
A. P. Mirando		Hand	748	0.88
Valid Votes			80,961	95.44
Rejected Votes			3,865	4.56
Total Polled			84,826	100.00
Registered Electors			63,213	
Turnout				1.34

=== 1952 Parliamentary General Election ===
Results of the 2nd parliamentary election held between 24 May 1952 and 30 May 1952:

Candidate	Party	Symbol	Votes	%
E. A. Nugawela	United National Party	Umbrella	30,503	33.61
C. A. S. Marikkar	Sri Lanka Freedom Party	Star	26,837	29.57
H. R. U. Premachandra	United National Party	Elephant	19,785	21.80
D. N. Nandunge		Scales	7,981	8.80
L. B. Samarakoon		Key	1,074	1.18
R. N. Samara Vijaya		Hand	758	0.84
Valid Votes			86,938	95.80
Rejected Votes			3,807	4.20
Total Polled			90,745	100.00
Registered Electors			68,444	
Turnout				1.33

=== 1956 Parliamentary General Election ===
Results of the 3rd parliamentary election held between 5 April 1956 and 10 April 1956:

Candidate	Party	Symbol	Votes	%
C. A. S. Marikkar	Sri Lanka Freedom Party	Hand	42,982	40.78
L. S. Jinasena	United National Party	Umbrella	27,488	26.08
E. A. Nugawela	United National Party	Elephant	24,790	23.52
D. B. Wijetunga		Scales	5,903	5.60
P. R. M. H. Banda Nikatenne		Cartwheel	1,237	1.17
Valid Votes			102,400	97.16
Rejected Votes			2,992	2.84
Total Polled			105,392	100.00
Registered Electors			77,486	
Turnout				1.36
