= Tamara Ilangaratne =

Ceylonese politician (1925–2000)

Hon. Tamara Kumari Ilangaratne

Member of the Ceylon Parliament for Kandy
- In office 1949–1952
- Preceded by: T. B. Ilangaratne
- Succeeded by: E. L. Senanayake

Member of Parliament for Galagedara
- In office 1970–1977
- Preceded by: W. M. G. T. Banda
- Succeeded by: W. M. G. T. Banda

Personal details
- Born: Tamara Kumari Aludeniya; 15 March 1925
- Died: 5 October 2000 (aged 75)
- Party: Sri Lanka Freedom Party
- Spouse: T. B. Ilangaratne
- Children: Sandhya, Rohana, Upeksha, Udaya
- Occupation: politician

Tamara Kumari Ilangaratne (née Aludeniya; 15 March 1925 – 5 October 2000) was a Ceylonese politician. She was the third female member to be elected to parliament in Sri Lanka (formerly Ceylon).

Ilangaratne was elected as the independent representative for Kandy in parliamentary by-election held on 18 June 1949, where she polled 10,062 votes (50.75% of the total vote) succeeding her husband T. B. Ilangaratne who had been unseated in an election petition and stripped of his civic rights. At the 2nd parliamentary elections in 1952, she failed to retain her seat, losing to the United National Party (UNP) candidate, E. L. Senanayake who received 11,349 votes (58.45%) to Ilangaratne's 7,644 votes (39.37%).

In 1965 Ilangaratne contested the seat of Galagedara at the 6th parliamentary elections, representing the Sri Lanka Freedom Party. She was narrowly beaten by the UNP candidate, W. M. G. T. Banda, by 574 votes. She was however successful at the subsequent parliamentary elections in 1970, defeating W. M. G. T. Banda, by 2,560 votes (securing 55% of the total vote). At the 1977 parliamentary elections she lost the seat to W. M. G. T. Banda, by 5,873 votes.

== Personal life ==
On September 4, 1944, she married T. B. Ilangaratne, a government clerk, who entered politics as a socialist and became senior government minister.

She died on 5 October 2000, at the age of 75.
