= Hewaheta Electoral District =

Former electoral district of Sri Lanka

Hewaheta electoral district was an electoral district of Sri Lanka between March 1960 and February 1989. The district was named after the town of Hewaheta in Kandy District, Central Province. The 1978 Constitution of Sri Lanka introduced the proportional representation electoral system for electing members of Parliament. The existing 160 mainly single-member electoral districts were replaced with 22 multi-member electoral districts. Hewaheta electoral district was replaced by the Kandy multi-member electoral district at the 1989 general elections.

== Members of Parliament ==
Key

Independent SLFP UNP

Election	Member	Party	Term
1960 (March)	T. B. Ilangaratne	Sri Lanka Freedom Party	1960
1960 (July)	T. B. Ilangaratne	Sri Lanka Freedom Party	1960-65
1965	M. A. Daniel	United National Party	1965-70
1970	Piyasena Tennakoon	Sri Lanka Freedom Party	1970-77
1977	M. A. Daniel	United National Party	1977-82
1982	Rupa Sriyani Daniel	United National Party	1982-89

== Elections ==
=== 1960 (March) Parliamentary General Election ===
Results of the 4th parliamentary election held on 19 March 1960:

Candidate	Party	Symbol	Votes	%
T. B. Ilangaratne	Sri Lanka Freedom Party	Hand	5,570	39.29
R. M. C. Ratnayake	United National Party	Elephant	2,909	20.52
M. A. Daniel	Independent	Ship	2,349	16.57
P. M. Jayaratne		Umbrella	1,222	8.62
M. B. Jayasinghe		Key	1,028	7.25
Premaratne Tennekoon		Cartwheel	400	2.82
K. B. Dissanayake		Clock	347	2.45
Indrapala Bulathsinghala		Eye	157	1.11
Valid Votes			13,982	98.62
Rejected Votes			195	1.38
Total Polled			14,177	100.00
Registered Electors			17,579	
Turnout				80.65

=== 1960 (July) Parliamentary General Election ===
Results of the 5th parliamentary election held on 20 July 1960:

Candidate	Party	Symbol	Votes	%
T. B. Ilangaratne	Sri Lanka Freedom Party	Hand	7,181	49.95
M. A. Daniel	United National Party	Elephant	7,055	49.07
Valid Votes			14,236	99.02
Rejected Votes			141	0.98
Total Polled			14,377	100.00
Registered Electors			17,579	
Turnout				81.79

=== 1965 Parliamentary General Election ===
Results of the 6th parliamentary election held on 22 March 1965:

Candidate	Party	Symbol	Votes	%
M. A. Daniel	United National Party	Elephant	10,622	53.21
T. B. Ilangaratne	Sri Lanka Freedom Party	Hand	9,219	46.18
Valid Votes			19,841	99.39
Rejected Votes			122	0.61
Total Polled			19,963	100.00
Registered Electors			22,478	
Turnout				88.81

=== 1970 Parliamentary General Election ===
Results of the 7th parliamentary election held on 27 May 1970:

Candidate	Party	Symbol	Votes	%
Piyasena Tennakoon	Sri Lanka Freedom Party	Hand	13,071	55.21
M. A. Daniel	United National Party	Elephant	10,454	44.15
Valid Votes			23,525	99.36
Rejected Votes			151	0.64
Total Polled			23,676	100.00
Registered Electors			26,489	
Turnout				89.38

=== 1977 Parliamentary General Election ===
Results of the 8th parliamentary election held on 21 July 1977:

Candidate	Party	Symbol	Votes	%
M. A. Daniel	United National Party	Elephant	17,355	61.13
Piyasena Tennakoon	Sri Lanka Freedom Party	Hand	10,605	37.35
Jayampathi Wickremaratna		Key	352	1.24
Valid Votes			28,312	99.72
Rejected Votes			80	0.28
Total Polled			28,392	100.00
Registered Electors			31,716	
Turnout				89.52

In April 1982 Daniel resigned his seat in parliament, following inquiries relating to his involvement in alleged gold-smuggling activities. His sister, Rupa Sriyani, was appointed by the United National Party as his replacement.
