= Neville Armstrong =

British soldier, literary agent, and publisher

Neville Spearman Armstrong
- Born: 20 October 1913; British Ceylon
- Died: September 2008 (aged 94)
- Occupation: soldier

Neville Spearman Armstrong (20 October 1913 – September 2008) was a British soldier, literary agent, and publisher. In the 1940s and early 1950s he was in partnerships with others, then from 1955 he operated his own publishing company called Neville Spearman.

== Early life ==
The son of a tea planter in British Ceylon, Armstrong was born there in 1913. His parents, John Spearman Armstrong and Dora Mary Brooke Booth, only daughter of John Brooke Booth, had married in January 1913 at Colombo. His grandfather, Charles Spearman Armstrong, born in 1847, had been a pioneer in growing tea and cinchona, the source of quinine, and had planted 750 acres of tea on an estate called Rookwood, near Hewaheta village, now located in Central Province.

When he was five, Armstrong was sent to England to be brought up by an unmarried aunt, while his parents stayed in Ceylon with their other three children. He arrived at Tilbury on the SS Herefordshire on 8 August 1919. His Armstrong grandparents had already retired and settled in England at West Byfleet, and his grandfather died there in 1924. Armstrong subsequently had a public school education, but he passed no examinations, and on leaving school he joined the Royal Academy of Dramatic Art. After struggling to become an actor for four years, he left the theatre. Margaret Rutherford commented on this: "You mean, dear boy, the theatre left you."

In October 1939, Armstrong and his wife were registered at 17 Marloes Road, Kensington; he was a journalist, she a guesthouse manager. In 1940, he enlisted in the British Army and for two years was a clerk in the Egyptian western desert. On 21 July 1943, Armstrong was commissioned as a second lieutenant into the Indian Army, after revealing his origins in Ceylon, although unable to speak Urdu. Given command of a Rajputana Rifles platoon with a Bren light machine gun, he fought at the battle of Monte Cassino in the spring of 1944. After that, he was posted to the Indian Army's Intelligence Corps in Delhi.

== Career ==
After the war, Armstrong became an impresario at Bolton's Theatre, South Kensington. This made little money, and he next tried his hand at working as a literary agent, which led him into book publishing. He went into a short-lived partnership with John Calder as Spearman Calder, then in 1948 Armstrong formed a publishing partnership with Peter Owen called Peter Neville. Owen was then aged only 21. In 1955, Armstrong launched his own London publishing house, under the name of Neville Spearman Publishers. One of his first publications under that name was the collected poems of Trevor Blakemore.

An obituary described Armstrong as “one of the last of the gentlemen publishers, who produced books mirroring their own whims and tastes”. Over forty years, he published more than five hundred books, with a wide range of subjects, which included chess, cookery, espionage, fiction, flying saucers, poetry, reincarnation, sex, spiritualism, and wrestling. They included a translation of Sartre's Intimacy and J. P. Donleavy’s The Ginger Man. In publishing Donleavy’s work in 1956, Armstrong insisted that it needed to be heavily censored, to avoid the author, publisher, and printer from being prosecuted under the Obscene Publications Acts. He published the first sexual instruction book "Your Erotic Fantasies!" by Graham Masterton, under the nom-de-plume Edward Thorne.

Armstrong was managing director of Neville Spearman Ltd. and Neville Spearman (Educational) Ltd. He was also a director of The Holland Press Ltd. and R. & B. Advertising Associates Ltd. He sold the Neville Spearman companies in 1985.

== Personal life ==
In 1937, at Westminster, Armstrong married firstly Margaret Gosschalk (1909–1999). There was a child of this marriage, but the couple separated about 1958.

In 1964, Armstrong's mother killed herself. He then joined the Samaritans as a volunteer and was trained by Chad Varah.

Armstrong lived in Jersey, Channel Islands, from 1973 to 1976, after which he lived part-time in Suffolk. He shared his life with Lili Munk for more than thirty years, and in 1999, after the death of his wife, they were married in a Buddhist religious ceremony on the lawn of the house at Great Waldingfield, Suffolk, where they had lived since the late 1970s.

Armstrong died in September 2008 at age 94.
