= Kandy Electoral District (1947–1989) =

Electoral district of Sri Lanka (1947-89)

Kandy (Mahanuwara) electoral district was an electoral district of Sri Lanka between August 1947 and February 1989. The district was named after the town of Kandy in Kandy District, Central Province. The 1978 Constitution of Sri Lanka introduced the proportional representation electoral system for electing members of Parliament. The existing 160 mainly single-member electoral districts were replaced with 22 multi-member electoral districts. Kandy electoral district was replaced by the Kandy multi-member electoral district at the 1989 general elections, the first under the proportional representation system, Kandy continues to be a polling division of the multi-member electoral district.

== Members of Parliament ==
Key

Independent SLFP UNP

Election	Member	Party	Term
1947	George E. de Silva	United National Party	1947 -1948
1948 by-election	Tikiri Bandara Ilangaratne	Independent	1948 - 1949
1949 by-election	Tamara Kumari Ilangaratne		1949 -1952
1952	E. L. Senanayake	United National Party	1952 -1954
1954 by-election	Fredrick de Silva		1954 -1956
1956	Piyasena Tennakoon	Sri Lanka Freedom Party	1956 - 1960
1960 (March)	E. L. Senanayake	United National Party	1960 - 1989
1960 (July)	E. L. Senanayake	United National Party	1960 - 1989
1965	E. L. Senanayake	United National Party	1960 - 1989
1970	E. L. Senanayake	United National Party	1960 - 1989
1977	E. L. Senanayake	United National Party	1960 - 1989

== Elections ==
=== 1947 Parliamentary General Election ===
Results of the 1st parliamentary election held between 23 August 1947 and 20 September 1947:

Candidate	Party	Symbol	Votes	%
George E. de Silva		Elephant	7,942	42.85
T. B. Ilangaratne		Hand	7,737	41.75
A. Godamune		Flower	2,350	12.68
T. B. Wadugodapitiya		Cartwheel	172	0.93
Valid Votes			18,201	98.20
Rejected Votes			332	1.79
Total Polled			18,533	100.00
Registered Electors			32,119	
Turnout				57.70

=== 1948 By-election ===
Results of the 1948 parliamentary by-election held on 18 May 1948:

Candidate	Party	Symbol	Votes	%
T. B. Ilangaratne		Umbrella	10,365	60.88
F. E. de Silva		Pair of Scales	6,508	39.38
D. B. Wadugodapitiya		Cup	165	0.97
Valid Votes			17,026	100.00
Rejected Votes			-	0.0
Total Polled			17,026	100.00
Registered Electors			32,119	
Turnout				53.01

=== 1949 By-election ===
Results of the 1948 parliamentary by-election held on 18 June 1949:

Candidate	Party	Symbol	Votes	%
Tamara Kumari Illangaratne		Star	10,062	50.75
A. C. L. Ratwatte		Hand	8,012	40.41
R. E. Jayatilleke		Elephant	1,137	5.73
D. B. Wagugodapitiya		Cartwheel	270	1.36
Valid Votes			19,481	98.26
Rejected Votes			346	1.75
Total Polled			19,827	100.00
Registered Electors			33,160	
Turnout				59.79

=== 1952 Parliamentary General Election ===
Results of the 2nd parliamentary election held between 24 May 1952 and 30 May 1952:

Candidate	Party	Symbol	Votes	%
E. L. Senanayake		Wheel	11,349	58.45
Tamara Kumari Illangaratne		Umbrella	7,644	39.37
Thilakaratnam Somasundaram		Star	277	1.43
Valid Votes			19,270	99.24
Rejected Votes			148	0.76
Total Polled			19,418	100.00
Registered Electors			27,707	
Turnout				70.01

=== 1954 By-election ===
Results of the 1954 parliamentary by-election held on 23 October 1954:

Candidate	Party	Symbol	Votes	%
Fredrick de Silva		Star	9,892	50.79
Piyasena Tennakoon		Elephant	9,493	48.74
Valid Votes			19,385	99.54
Rejected Votes			90	0.46
Total Polled			19,475	100.00
Registered Electors			30,821	
Turnout				63.19

=== 1956 Parliamentary General Election ===
Results of the 3rd parliamentary election held between 5 April 1956 and 10 April 1956:

Candidate	Party	Symbol	Votes	%
Piyasena Tennakoon	Sri Lanka Freedom Party	Hand	11,005	52.78
E. L. Senanayake	United National Party	Elephant	9,766	46.84
Valid Votes			20,771	99.63
Rejected Votes			78	0.37
Total Polled			20,849	100.00
Registered Electors			33,184	
Turnout				62.83

=== 1960 (March) Parliamentary General Election ===
Results of the 4th parliamentary election held on 19 March 1960:

Candidate	Party	Symbol	Votes	%
E. L. Senanayake	United National Party	Elephant	6,924	51.54
W. S. Karunaratne		Cartwheel	5,300	39.45
H. A. C. Wickremaratne		Sun	950	7.07
M. L. Cooray		Umbrella	173	1.29
Valid Votes			13,347	99.34
Rejected Votes			88	0.66
Total Polled			13,435	100.00
Registered Electors			18,252	
Turnout				73.61

=== 1960 (July) Parliamentary General Election ===
Results of the 5th parliamentary election held on 20 July 1960:

Candidate	Party	Symbol	Votes	%
E. L. Senanayake	United National Party	Elephant	7,496	54.99
S. L. Ratwatte	Sri Lanka Freedom Party	Hand	6,087	44.65
Valid Votes			13,583	99.64
Rejected Votes			49	0.36
Total Polled			13,632	100.00
Registered Electors			18,252	
Turnout				74.69

=== 1965 Parliamentary General Election ===
Results of the 6th parliamentary election held on 22 March 1965:

Candidate	Party	Symbol	Votes	%
E. L. Senanayake	United National Party	Elephant	10,264	59.52
G. B. de Silva	Sri Lanka Freedom Party	Hand	6,827	39.59
Valid Votes			17,091	99.11
Rejected Votes			153	0.89
Total Polled			17,244	100.00
Registered Electors			20,910	
Turnout				82.47

=== 1970 Parliamentary General Election ===
Results of the 7th parliamentary election held on 27 May 1970:

Candidate	Party	Symbol	Votes	%
E. L. Senanayake	United National Party	Elephant	11,150	52.19
G. B. de Silva	Sri Lanka Freedom Party	Hand	10,121	47.38
Valid Votes			21,271	99.57
Rejected Votes			92	0.43
Total Polled			21,363	100.00
Registered Electors			25,809	
Turnout				82.77

=== 1977 Parliamentary General Election ===
Results of the 8th parliamentary election held on 21 July May 1977:

Candidate	Party	Symbol	Votes	%
E. L. Senanayake	United National Party	Elephant	14,154	64.40
H. M. Navaratne	Sri Lanka Freedom Party	Hand	7,043	32.04
G. B. de Silva		Pair of Scales	673	3.06
M. B. C. Ehaleypola		Cartwheel	36	0.16
Valid Votes			21,906	99.67
Rejected Votes			73	0.33
Total Polled			21,979	100.00
Registered Electors			26,921	
Turnout				81.64
