= Amba Yaluwo =

Sri Lankan Novel

Amba Yaluwo අඹ යාලුවෝ
- Amba Yaluwo
- Author: T. B. Ilangaratne
- Translators: Seneviratne B. Aludeniya (English)
- Language: Sinhala
- Genre: Fiction
- Publication date: 1957
- Publication place: Sri Lanka
- Media type: Book

Amba Yaluwo (Sinhala: අඹ යාලුවෝ, lit. 'Best Friends') is a 1957 novel by Sri Lankan author Tikiri Bandara Ilangaratne. The novel has been translated into multiple languages with the English translation by Seneviratne B. Aludeniya being published by Sarasavi Publishers in 1998. It is set in the 1930s.

A television series based on the novel was released in 1990.

== Synopsis ==
The story focuses on the friendship between two youngs boys, Nimal and Sunil (Sudhu Appo), and the socio-economic clashes that surround them. The story begins with Sunil stealing a mango that Nimal had picked up, over which they then fight. Sunil mulls over his mistake and then he becomes Nimal's friend. Seeing that Nimal's family is struggling a lot, Sunil starts giving food to Nimal's family and their friendship becomes stronger.

In this story, both Nimal and Sunil are kept apart because of their places and castes in society; Sunil comes from a higher caste and is forced to keep away from Nimal, whose father is a daily wage worker. But no matter how hard their elders try to keep them apart, the duo find a way to see each other every day. The duo's fates are shown to be intertwined throughout the story. The story continues, with Sunil's family moving out of the village and into the city, and Nimal being hired as their family servant.
