= Piyasena Tennakoon =

Ceylonese lawyer and politician

Hon. Piyasena Tennakoon

Member of the Ceylon Parliament for Kandy
- In office 1956–1960
- Preceded by: Fredrick de Silva
- Succeeded by: E. L. Senanayake

Member of the Ceylon Parliament for Hewaheta
- In office 1970–1977
- Preceded by: M. A. Daniel
- Succeeded by: M. A. Daniel

Personal details
- Born: 3 June 1917
- Died: 25 February 1982 (aged 64)
- Party: Sri Lanka Freedom Party
- Profession: lawyer, politician

Piyasena Tennakoon (3 June 1917 – 25 February 1982) was a Ceylonese lawyer and politician.

Tennakoon was educated at Ananda College, Colombo. He later graduated from the Ceylon Law College and became an advocate. He was appointed as the District Revenue Officer of Kolonne.

In 1952 he ran at 2nd parliamentary elections, held in May, in the Galaha electorate. He lost to the incumbent, Theodore Braybrooke Panabokke, by 4,606 votes.

Tennakoon next contested the parliamentary by-election for the seat of Kandy, held on 23 October 1954, representing the United National Party. He was unsuccessful, losing to the former Mayor of Kandy, Fredrick de Silva, by 399 votes. He ran again at the 3rd parliamentary election, held in April 1956, this time as the Sri Lanka Freedom Party candidate. He was elected, polling 11,005 votes (53% of the total vote), 1,239 votes ahead of the United National Party candidate, Edward Lionel Senanayake.

On 20 April 1956, Tennakoon was elected as the Deputy Speaker of Parliament, a position he retained until 16 September 1958, when he was replaced by the member for Gampola, Richard Stanley Pelpola.

He contested the newly created seat of Senkadagala at the 4th parliamentary election held on 19 March 1960, where he lost to Noel Wimalasena, of the United National Party by 1,157 votes. He re-contested the seat at the 6th parliamentary election, for the Sri Lanka Freedom Party, losing again to Wimalasena, this time by 3,370 votes.

At the 7th parliamentary election, held on 27 May 1970, he ran for the seat of Hewaheta, as the Sri Lanka Freedom Party candidate. He won the seat by 2,617 votes, defeating the sitting member, Mahahitana Arachchige Daniel, from the United National Party. He was unable to retain the seat at the subsequent 8th parliamentary election, held on 21 July 1977, losing to Daniel by 6,750 votes.
