= L. S. Jinasena =

Ceylonese lawyer and politician

Lankabaranage Bopal Sudhira Jinasena (16 January 1906 - ?) was a Ceylonese lawyer and politician.

In 1956 he was elected as the second member of the Parliament of Ceylon for Kadugannawa, representing the United National Party at the 3rd parliamentary election. On 18 September 1958 he was elected the Deputy Chairman of Committees, a position he retained until 5 December 1959.
