= Marlon Von Hagt =

Sri Lankan cricketer (born 1965)

Personal information
- Full name: Dudley Marlon Von Hagt
- Born: 31 March 1965 (age 61); Kalutara
- Batting: Right-handed
- Bowling: Right-arm medium

International information
- National side: Sri Lanka
- Only ODI (cap 40): 3 February 1985 v Australia

Career statistics
Competition	ODI
Matches	1
Runs scored	8
Batting average	8.00
100s/50s	0/0
Top score	8
Catches/stumpings	0/–
- Source: Cricinfo, 1 May 2016

Dudley Marlon Von Hagt (born 31 March 1965) is a former Sri Lankan cricketer who played one One Day International in 1985. He currently lives in Victoria, Australia.

== International career ==
Von Hagt was part of the Sri Lanka squad that toured England in 1984. He was the 12th man for the one-off test at Lord's. He Represented Sri Lanka in an ODI of the Benson & Hedges World Series Cup in February 1985 vs. Australia at Perth. But appearances thereafter were limited - he all but stopped playing after 1986, returning for three matches for Moors Sports Club in 1988–89 with some success.

In February 2020, he was named in Sri Lanka's squad for the Over-50s Cricket World Cup in South Africa. However, the tournament was cancelled during the third round of matches due to the coronavirus pandemic.

== Personal life ==
Von Hagt attended St. Anthony's College, Kandy. He is a cousin of former Sri Lanka captain Marvan Atapattu
