= Charles Spearman Armstrong =

Irish-born pioneer of tea and cinchona in Ceylon

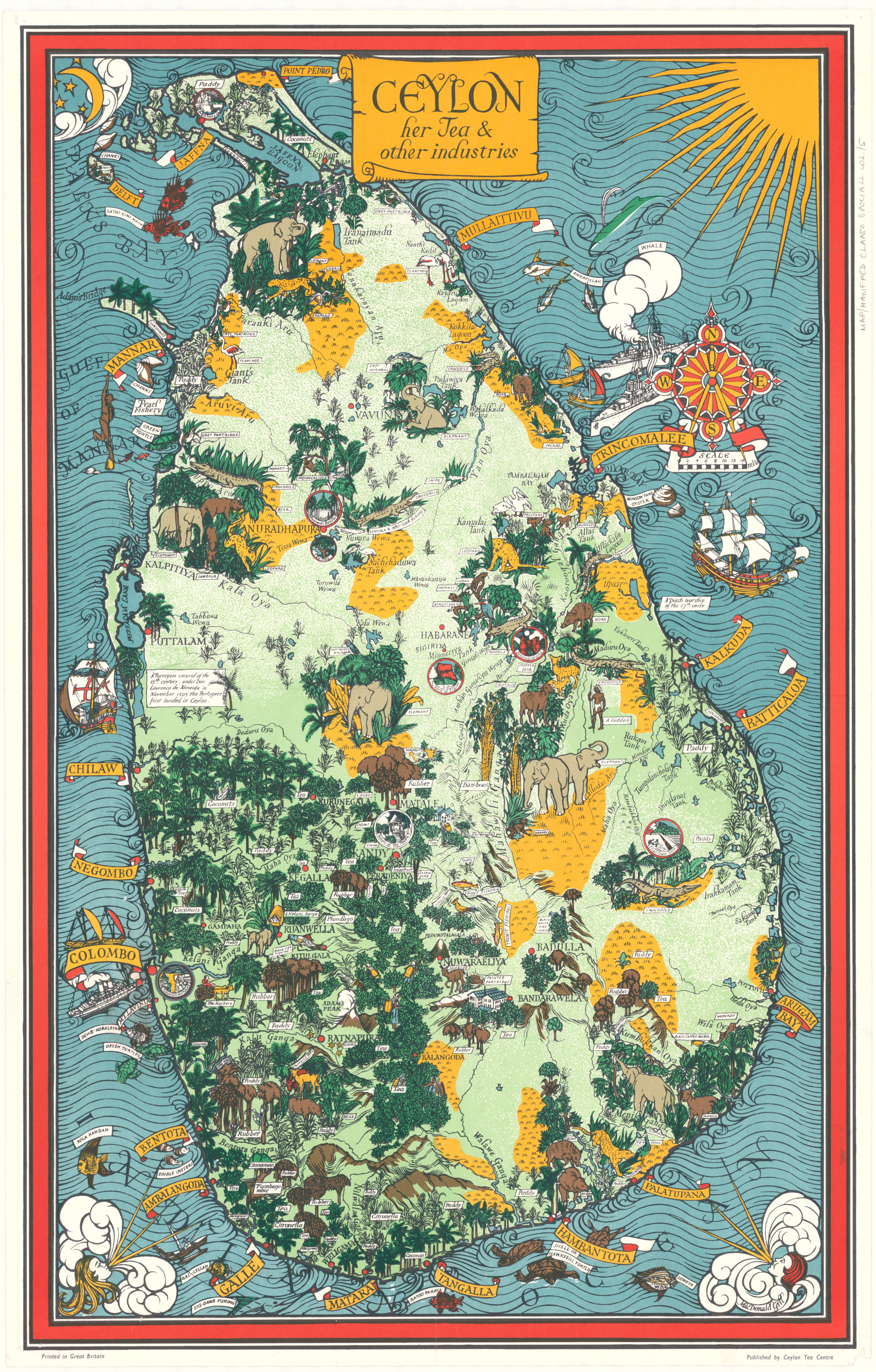
Tea in British Ceylon

Charles Spearman Armstrong (1847–1924) was an Irish-born pioneer of tea and cinchona in British Ceylon, where he arrived in 1863.

He was the author of Tea Cultivation in Ceylon (1884).

== Life ==
Armstrong was born in Youghal, County Cork, Ireland.

In 1863, at the age of sixteen, Armstrong sailed to Ceylon, at a time when planters there were abandoning their plantations, due to a collapse in coffee. By 1864, he had gained possession of a former coffee estate called Rookwood at Hewaheta. This lies on a high plateau, some thirty miles from Kandy and fifteen miles from Nuwara Eliya. Travelling there by horse, Armstrong found an estate of moribund coffee trees and a log cabin. With some other young men, he rode to Talaimannar and rowed across the Palk Strait to India. They came back with sacks of tea seed, and Armstrong planted 750 acres of tea at Rookwood. He also planted cinchona trees.

James Taylor is widely considered to be the first man to plant tea in British Ceylon as an agricultural enterprise, and this was in 1867 at the Loolecondera estate near Deltota. However, a granite monument at Rookwood erected by his children claims that Armstrong grew cinchona and tea there from 1864 to 1908.

Armstrong was in the habit of getting up before dawn to work in his fields and worked most days until after dark. At Rookwood he built a new house and laid out an English garden. In 1875, he married Angelina, who had been born in Colombo, and they had five children.

In 1874, Armstrong and R. W. Wickham bought the Holmwood Estate. In 1877 he sold his interest in the estate to Wickham. From 1880 to 1884 he was the owner of an estate called Amunamulla.

In 1884, Armstrong published a book, Tea Cultivation in Ceylon. In 1891, he was a member of the Standing Committee of the Ceylon Tea Fund.

== Retirement ==
In 1908, Armstrong retired to England and was succeeded at Rookwood by his son, John Spearman Armstrong, who managed the plantation until 1944.

C. S. Armstrong and his wife settled in a large house at West Byfleet with two of their daughters, Mabel and Ethel, and their son Guy Spearman Armstrong, who was killed in 1915 while serving in the Scots Guards. Armstrong died in 1924.

Armstrong's grandson, Neville Armstrong, who had been born at Rookwood in 1913, had clear memories of his grandfather in 1997. He described him as "an introverted man who said very little. There were no arguments, no wise sayings, no advice given. It was a very strict Victorian family." Physically, he remembered "piercing blue eyes and a large white spade beard".
