= E. A. Nugawela =

Ceylonese lawyer, soldier and politician

Hon. Maj. E. A. Nugawela ED
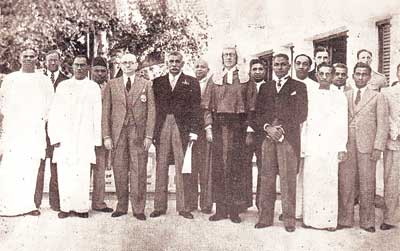
- E. A. Nugawela in the first Cabinet of Ministers of Ceylon

Minister of Education
- In office 26 September 1947 – 12 October 1953
- Prime Minister: D. S. Senanayake, Dudley Senanayake
- Preceded by: C. W. W. Kannangara
- Succeeded by: M. D. Banda

Minister of Health
- In office 12 October 1953 – April 1956
- Prime Minister: Sir John Kotelawala
- Preceded by: Dudley Senanayake
- Succeeded by: Vimala Wijewardene

Member of Parliament for Kadugannawa
- In office 1947–1956
- Preceded by: Post created
- Succeeded by: C. A. S. Marikkar

Personal details
- Born: 21 September 1898 Kandy, Ceylon
- Died: 5 July 1972 (aged 73) Kandy, Ceylon
- Party: United National Party
- Spouse: Louise Gooneratna
- Education: Royal College, Colombo
- Profession: Advocate

Military service
- Branch/service: Ceylon Defense Force
- Years of service: 1928-1947
- Rank: Major
- Unit: Ceylon Light Infantry

Major Edward "Eddie" Alexander Nugawela, ED (21 September 1898 – 5 July 1972) was a Ceylonese lawyer, soldier and politician. He was the first Cabinet Minister of Education in independent Sri Lanka (then Ceylon) (1947–1954), later Cabinet Minister of Health (1954–1956), a Member of Parliament and State Council.

== Early life and education ==
Born in Kandy, to the Radala Nugawela family. His father was Punchi Banda Nugawela who was the Rate Mahatmaya of Sarasiyapattuwa and the Diyawadana Nilame of the Temple of the Tooth. His mother was Mallika Dunuwila, daughter of Dunuwila Disawa. Nugawela was educated at Royal College, Colombo.

== Legal career ==
Studying law at the Ceylon Law College, Nugawela qualified as an Advocate of the Supreme Court of Ceylon. He established his legal practice in the Unofficial Bar in Kandy.

== Military service ==
Nugawela joined the Ceylon Light Infantry as a volunteer officer having been commissioned as a Second Lieutenant in 1928. Mobilized for war service during World War II in 1940, he was promoted to the rank of Major in 1942. He was awarded the Efficiency Decoration, the Defence Medal and the War Medal 1939–1945.

== Political career ==
=== State Council of Ceylon ===
Captain Nugawela entered politics in the 1936 Ceylonese State Council election, succeeding his father P. B. Nugawela Dissawe to the Galagedera seat in the second State Council of Ceylon. In the State Council he was elected a member of the Executive Committee of Health and served as a member of the Special Committee on Education setup in 1940. He on the Board of Income Tax and District Road Committee, Kandy.

=== House of Representatives ===
Major Nugawela was elected to the House of Representatives of the first Parliament of Ceylon, in the 1947 general election from Kadugannawa representing the United National Party and was appointed the Minister of Education by Prime Minister D. S. Senanayake on 26 September 1947. He retain the Education portfolio in Dudley Senanayake's cabinet having been re-elected in 1952 general election. He is noted for educational reforms and increasing the number of state schools during his tenure, implementation the free education scheme started by Dr C.W.W. Kannangara. He was the Pro-Chancellor of the University of Ceylon. In October 1953, he was appointed Minister of Health by the newly appointed Prime Minister Sir John Kotelawala and served in this capacity till early 1956. He lost his seat in the 1956 general election to C. A. S. Marikkar.

== Legacy ==
The Government of Sri Lanka issued a stamp in his honor on 22 May 1988 and the E.A. Nugawela Primary School in Werellagama was named after him.

== Family ==
He married Louise Gooneratna.
