= A. C. M. Lafir =

Ceylonese cricketer (1935–2022)

Personal information
- Full name: Abdul Cader Mohamed Lafir
- Born: 27 October 1935; Kandy, British Ceylon
- Died: 18 May 2022 (aged 86)
- Batting: Right-handed
- Role: Opening batsman

Domestic team information
- Years: Team
- 1955/56-1961/62: Ceylon
- 1956/57-1960/61: Ceylon Cricket Association

Career statistics
Competition	FC
Matches	10
Runs scored	659
Batting average	41.18
100s/50s	2/4
Top score	121*
Balls bowled	30
Wickets	1
Bowling average	18.00
5 wickets in innings	–
10 wickets in match	–
Best bowling	1/18
Catches/stumpings	6/–
- Source: Cricinfo, 29 September 2013

Abdul Cader Mohamed Lafir (27 October 1935 – 18 May 2022) was an opening batsman who played for Ceylon from 1953 to 1970 before Test status was awarded to the country in 1981.

== Early life ==
Abdul Cader Mohamed Lafir was born on 27 October 1935 at Katugastota near Kandy. In 1948, he entered St. Anthony's College, Kandy, and captained the First XI in the college's centenary year in 1954.

In 1962 Lafir married Carmini (née Ratnam), an English graduate and teacher. They had three children, Aashiq, Nirala and Mehera.

== Cricket ==
=== Schools cricket ===
Lafir holds the Sri Lanka record for an opening stand of 266 runs, scoring 176 runs by himself as the school team captain, with Ronnie Stevens scoring 120 runs, in the 1954 annual match against Trinity College, Kandy. He won four awards – best batsman, best bowler, best all-rounder and highest scorer. Lafir's school cricket batting average was 108.06, breaking the record of 92.6 set in 1918 by Jack Anderson; scoring five centuries and amassing 1,000 runs in a season. He scored the 'fastest 100' in 60 minutes against Ananda College Colombo, in 1954. He led St. Anthony's in 1954 to become the unbeaten Inter-school Champions and won the Sri Lanka schools Best Batsman Award. He skippered the Kandy schools XI and led them to victory over the Colombo schools XI with a captain's knock of 151 not out.

=== Representing Sri Lanka ===
He made his first-class debut in the annual Gopalan Trophy match against Madras in Madras in 1955–56. Opening the batting, he scored the only century in the match, 107, as Ceylon won by an innings. He was the first schoolboy from St. Anthony's College to play for Ceylon.

In 1960 the Pakistan Eaglets visited Colombo and played a three-day match against the CCA led by C. I. Gunasekera which included Lafir and in the following year he played against India and scored 55. He also toured Malaya and Singapore in 1957.

In 1961 the first consignment of Norm O'Neill cricket bats "Hydromatic Driver" was manufactured in Australia and imported by Dr. Subash Chawla's Sports firm Chands Ltd. At a special function to launch these new bats, an award to the first batsman to score 500 runs was made to A. C. M. Lafir by the Australian Trade Commissioner in Sri Lanka Desmond McSweeney.

In 1960-61 Lafir was the only player on either side to make a century in the Gopalan Trophy match, which the Ceylon Cricket Association won. In his last first-class match in 1961-62 he top-scored for Ceylon with 84 against the MCC led by Ted Dexter.

=== Mercantile cricket ===
Lafir later played for Saracens Sports Club and Nomads Sports Club. His Mercantile record score of 236 was against Rowlands. Lafir was the first batsman to win the Macan Markar Trophy awarded for the highest score of 256 not out, playing for Nomads vs University in 1966. He beat the previous best of 236 by Makin Salih.

== Later life ==
In 1957, Lafir joined the Police Department as a sub-inspector and later served at Esso and worked in the Middle East for a couple of years. In 1962 he joined Lever Bros. Ltd. and played some match winning innings for the company. He scored 121 runs, which included 14 fours and 5 sixes, enabling Levers to regain the Lister Challenge Trophy from BCC in the 'Battle of the Soaps'. In 1975 Lafir opened his Cricket Coaching School at the Nomads grounds for boys between the ages of 12 and 15 years where he trained Roshan Mahanama, Asanka Gurusinha, Nigel Fernando and many others who reached Sri Lanka levels. In 1981 he moved to Melbourne, Australia. While he was there he attended Frank Tyson's Coaching School at Monash University and was awarded an intermediate coaching certificate registered with the Victorian Cricket Association. He returned to Sri Lanka in 1982. He was appointed chairman of the selection committee of the Colombo District Cricket Association (CDCA) in June 2004.

In September 2018, Lafir was one of 49 former Sri Lankan cricketers felicitated by Sri Lanka Cricket, to honour them for their services before Sri Lanka became a full member of the International Cricket Council (ICC).

== Death ==
He died on 18 May 2022 at the age of 86. His funeral was held on 19 May 2022.

== See also ==
- Trinity-Antonian Cricket Encounter
- Cricket in Sri Lanka
