= Galagedara Electoral District =

Former electoral district of Sri Lanka

Galagedara electoral district was an electoral district of Sri Lanka between March 1960 and February 1989. The district was named after the town of Galagedara in Kandy District, Central Province. The 1978 Constitution of Sri Lanka introduced the proportional representation electoral system for electing members of Parliament. The existing 160 mainly single-member electoral districts were replaced with 22 multi-member electoral districts. electoral district was replaced by the Kandy multi-member electoral district at the 1989 general elections.

== Members of Parliament ==
Key

Independent SLFP UNP

Election	Member	Party	Term
1960 (March)	C. A. S. Marikkar	Sri Lanka Freedom Party	1960
1960 (July)	K. Abdul Jabbar	Sri Lanka Freedom Party	1960-1965
1965	W. M. G. T. Banda	United National Party	1965-1970
1970	Tamara Kumari Ilangaratne	Sri Lanka Freedom Party	1970-1977
1977	W. M. G. T. Banda	United National Party	1977-1989

== Elections ==
=== 1960 (March) Parliamentary General Election ===
Results of the 4th parliamentary election held on 19 March 1960:

Candidate	Party	Symbol	Votes	%
C. A. S. Marikkar	Sri Lanka Freedom Party	Hand	4,493	30.47
A. B. Walgampaya	United National Party	Elephant	3,833	25.99
K. Abdul Jabbar		Ladder	2,297	15.58
H. M. D. Perera		Umbrella	1,373	9.31
D. N. Nadunge		Star	1,312	8.90
Gamini Abeykoon		Cartwheel	1,265	8.58
Valid Votes			14,573	98.82
Rejected Votes			174	1.18
Total Polled			14,747	100.00
Registered Electors			18,060	
Turnout				81.66

=== 1960 (July) Parliamentary General Election ===
Results of the 5th parliamentary election held on 20 July 1960:

Candidate	Party	Symbol	Votes	%
K. Abdul Jabbar	Sri Lanka Freedom Party	Hand	8,071	54.99
W. M. G. T. Banda	United National Party	Elephant	6,012	40.96
P. B. Herath		Cartwheel	288	1.96
P. M. Abeyratne		Clock	235	1.60
Valid Votes			14,606	99.51
Rejected Votes			72	0.49
Total Polled			14,678	100.00
Registered Electors			18,060	
Turnout				81.27

=== 1965 Parliamentary General Election ===
Results of the 6th parliamentary election held on 22 March 1965:

Candidate	Party	Symbol	Votes	%
W. M. G. T. Banda	United National Party	Elephant	10,133	50.51
Tamara Kumari Ilangaratne	Sri Lanka Freedom Party	Hand	9,559	47.65
Mohammed Busary		Ship	191	0.95
P. B. Herath		Cartwheel	83	0.41
Valid Votes			19,966	99.52
Rejected Votes			97	0.48
Total Polled			20,063	100.00
Registered Electors			23,033	
Turnout				87.11

=== 1970 Parliamentary General Election ===
Results of the 7th parliamentary election held on 27 May 1970:

Candidate	Party	Symbol	Votes	%
Tamara Kumari Ilangaratne	Sri Lanka Freedom Party	Hand	13,211	55.21
W. M. G. T. Banda	United National Party	Elephant	10,651	44.51
Valid Votes			23,862	99.72
Rejected Votes			67	0.28
Total Polled			23,929	100.00
Registered Electors			26,702	
Turnout				89.62

=== 1977 Parliamentary General Election ===
Results of the 7th parliamentary election held on 21 July 1977:

Candidate	Party	Symbol	Votes	%
W. M. G. T. Banda	United National Party	Elephant	17,092	60.06
Tamara Kumari Ilangaratne	Sri Lanka Freedom Party	Hand	11,219	39.42
Nimalasiri Alahakoon		Key	148	0.52
Valid Votes			28,390	99.76
Rejected Votes			69	0.24
Total Polled			28,459	100.00
Registered Electors			31,555	
Turnout				
