= M. A. Daniel =

Sri Lankan politician

Hon. M. A. Daniel

Member of Parliament for Kandy
- In office February 1989 – 25 June 1989
- Preceded by: constituency created

Member of Parliament for Hewaheta
- In office 7 September 1977 – 18 April 1982
- Preceded by: Piyasena Tennakoon
- Succeeded by: Rupa Sriyani Daniel
- In office 5 April 1965 – 25 March 1970
- Preceded by: T. B. Ilangaratne
- Succeeded by: Piyasena Tennakoon

Personal details
- Born: Mahahitana Arachchige Daniel; 24 October 1953 Thalatuoya, Sri Lanka
- Died: 25 June 1989 (aged 35) Colombo, Sri Lanka
- Party: United National Party
- Occupation: Politician

Mahahitana Arachchige Daniel (24 October 1953 – 25 June 1989) was a Sri Lankan politician.

Daniel first ran for parliament in the 4th parliamentary election, held on 19 March 1960, contesting the newly created seat of Hewaheta as an independent. He came third in the polls, with 2,349 votes behind T. B. Ilangaratne (Sri Lanka Freedom Party) 5,570 votes and R. M. C. Ratnayake (United National Party) 2,909 votes. At the subsequent 5th parliamentary election, held on 20 July 1960, he re-contested the seat this time as the United National Party candidate, losing to Ilangaratne by 126 votes. He was successful at the 6th parliamentary election, held on 22 March 1965, defeating Ilangaratne by 1,403 votes.

Daniel failed to retain his seat at the 7th parliamentary election, held on 27 May 1970, where he lost to the Sri Lanka Freedom Party candidate, Piyasena Tennakoon. At the 8th parliamentary election, held on 21 July 1977, he regained the seat defeating Tennakoon by 7,290 votes. On 18 April 1982 Daniel resigned his seat in parliament, following inquiries relating to his involvement in alleged gold-smuggling activities. His sister, Rupa Sriyani, was appointed by the United National Party as his replacement.

In the 9th parliamentary election, held on 15 February 1989, he ran in the Kandy (Mahanuwara) electoral district, one of the newly formed multi-member electoral districts in Sri Lanka, created by the 1978 Constitution of Sri Lanka. He was one of nine United National Party candidates elected, receiving 53,396 preferential votes.

Daniel was murdered on 25 June 1989.
