= Kolonnawa Electoral District =

Electoral district of Sri Lanka

Kolonnawa electoral district was an electoral district of Sri Lanka between March 1960 and February 1989. The district was named after the town of Kolonnawa in Colombo District, Western Province. The 1978 Constitution of Sri Lanka introduced the proportional representation electoral system for electing members of Parliament. The existing 160 mainly single-member electoral districts were replaced with 22 multi-member electoral districts. Kolonnawa electoral district was replaced by the Colombo multi-member electoral district at the 1989 general elections.

== Members of Parliament ==
Key

Independent MEP SLFP UNP

| Election | Member | Party | Term |
|---|---|---|---|
| 1960 (March) | K. E. Perera | MEP | 1960-1960 |
| 1960 (July) | D. S. Samarasinghe | SLFP | 1960-1965 |
| 1965 | D. S. Samarasinghe | SLFP | 1965-1967 |
| 1967 (by-election) | T. B. Ilangaratne | SLFP | 1967-1970 |
| 1970 | T. B. Ilangaratne | SLFP | 1970-1977 |
| 1977 | Weerasinghe Mallimarachchi | UNP | 1977-1989 |

== Elections ==
=== 1960 (March) Parliamentary General Election ===
| Candidate | Party | Symbol | Votes | % |
|---|---|---|---|---|
| Valid Votes | | | | 100.00% |
| Rejected Votes | | | | |
| Total Polled | | | | |
| Registered Electors | | | | |
| Turnout | | | | |

=== 1960 (July) Parliamentary General Election ===
| Candidate | Party | Symbol | Votes | % |
|---|---|---|---|---|
| Valid Votes | | | | 100.00% |
| Rejected Votes | | | | |
| Total Polled | | | | |
| Registered Electors | | | | |
| Turnout | | | | |

=== 1965 Parliamentary General Election ===
| Candidate | Party | Symbol | Votes | % |
|---|---|---|---|---|
| Valid Votes | | | | 100.00% |
| Rejected Votes | | | | |
| Total Polled | | | | |
| Registered Electors | | | | |
| Turnout | | | | |

=== 1970 Parliamentary General Election ===
| Candidate | Party | Symbol | Votes | % |
|---|---|---|---|---|
| Valid Votes | | | | 100.00% |
| Rejected Votes | | | | |
| Total Polled | | | | |
| Registered Electors | | | | |
| Turnout | | | | |

=== 1977 Parliamentary General Election ===
| Candidate | Party | Symbol | Votes | % |
|---|---|---|---|---|
| Valid Votes | | | | 100.00% |
| Rejected Votes | | | | |
| Total Polled | | | | |
| Registered Electors | | | | |
| Turnout | | | | |
