= Fredrick de Silva =

Ceylonese lawyer and politician

Hon. Fredrick de Silva MBE

Ceylon Ambassador to France and UNESCO

Member of the Ceylon Parliament for Kandy
- In office 1954–1956
- Preceded by: E. L. Senanayake
- Succeeded by: Piyasena Tennakoon

Personal details
- Born: Edmund Fredrick Lorenz de Silva; 1912
- Died: 1993 (aged 80–81)
- Party: United National Party
- Children: Sir Desmond de Silva QC
- Profession: Barrister

Edmund Fredrick Lorenz de Silva, MBE (1912–1993) was a Ceylonese lawyer and politician. He was the Mayor of Kandy, Member of Parliament and Sri Lanka's Ambassador to France.

== Early life and legal career ==
Born to George E. de Silva, a prominent proctor and legislator, he was educated at Hillwood Girls' School (Hillwood College, Kandy); Trinity College, Kandy and S. Thomas' College, Mount Lavinia, where he was classmates with Dudley Senanayake. He returned to Trinity College for his final year. In 1931, he won the Open Law Scholarship to Ceylon Law College and became a proctor in 1935 and started his practice at his father's firm De Silva & Karunaratne. In 1950, he became an advocate and was called to bar at the Gray's Inn in 1959 as a barrister. He also played rugby union for the Ceylonese Rugby & Football Club and the Kandy Sports Club and was the president of the Kandy YMCA.

== Political career ==
De Silva, joined his father when he was elected to the Kandy Municipal Council in 1939 and was elected Mayor of Kandy in 1947. His father who was the first Minister of Industries, lost his parliamentary seat less a year into his tenure due to an election petition filed by his rival T.B. Illangaratne, which stripped his father of his civic rights. In the by-election that followed, Fredrick de Silva contested from the United National Party and lost to Illangaratne. He was appointed a Member of the Order of the British Empire (MBE) for his social services during the 1947 floods in the 1952 Birthday Honours. Contesting the by-election in 1954 for the Kandy electorate as an independent, de Silva was elected the Member of Parliament and held the post till 1956.

From 1968 to 1971 he served as Ceylon's ambassador to France and was the head of Sri Lanka's delegation to UNESCO from 1968 to 1971. He was elected to the governing body (executive board) of the UNESCO. He was the chancellor of the University of Peradeniya from 1990 to 1993.

== Personal life ==
His son is Sir Desmond de Silva, former United Nations chief war crimes prosecutor in Sierra Leone.

== See also ==
- Sri Lankan Non Career Diplomats
