= Galaha Electoral District =

Former electoral district of Sri Lanka

Galaha electoral district was an electoral district of Sri Lanka between August 1947 and March 1960. The district was named after the town of Galaha in Kandy District, Central Province. The 1978 Constitution of Sri Lanka introduced the proportional representation electoral system for electing members of Parliament. The existing 160 mainly single-member electoral districts were replaced with 22 multi-member electoral districts. Galaha electoral district was replaced by the Kandy multi-member electoral district at the 1989 general elections, the first under the proportional representation system.

== Members of Parliament ==
Key

Independent SLFP UNP

Election	Member	Party	Term
1947	Theodore Braybrooke Panabokke	United National Party	1947 - 1956
1952	Theodore Braybrooke Panabokke	United National Party	1947 - 1956
1956	T. B. Ilangaratne	Sri Lanka Freedom Party	1956 - 1960

== Elections ==
=== 1947 Parliamentary General Election ===
Results of the 1st parliamentary election held between 23 August 1947 and 20 September 1947:

Candidate	Party	Symbol	Votes	%
Theodore Braybrooke Panabokke	United National Party	Pair of Scales	7,638	27.57
P. N. Jayasena		Star	5,289	19.09
G. R. Rajapriyar		Cartwheel	5,143	18.57
C. A. S. Marikkar		Hand	4,399	15.88
W. A. B. Soysa		Elephant	3,169	11.44
B. H. Dunuwila		House	1,345	4.86
Valid Votes			26,983	97.41
Rejected Votes			718	2.59
Total Polled			27,701	100.00
Registered Electors			37,874	
Turnout				73.14

=== 1952 Parliamentary General Election ===
Results of the 2nd parliamentary election held between 24 May 1952 and 30 May 1952:

Candidate	Party	Symbol	Votes	%
Theodore Braybrooke Panabokke	United National Party	House	10,962	47.69
Piyasena Tennakoon		Pair of Scales	6,356	27.63
Stanley Edward, Sirimanne		Hand	4,725	20.56
Seetha Kumari Walgampaya		Elephant	596	2.59
Valid Votes			22,639	98.50
Rejected Votes			346	1.50
Total Polled			22,985	100.00
Registered Electors			32,774	
Turnout				70.13

=== 1956 Parliamentary General Election ===
Results of the 3rd parliamentary election held between 5 April 1956 and 10 April 1956:

Candidate	Party	Symbol	Votes	%
T. B. Ilangaratne	Sri Lanka Freedom Party	Hand	16,924	61.21
Theodore Braybrooke Panabokke	United National Party	Elephant	10,490	37.94
Valid Votes			27,414	99.14
Rejected Votes			237	0.86
Total Polled			27,651	100.00
Registered Electors			38,400	
Turnout				72.00
