= Anuki Premachandra =

Sri Lankan social activist, writer and speaker

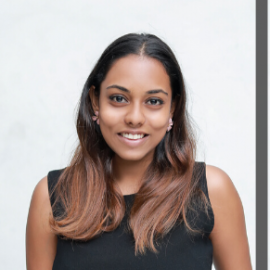
- Born: Sri Lanka
- Education: Lyceum International School, Wattala
- Occupations: Social activist, women's rights activist, writer, motivational speaker

Anuki Premachandra is a Sri Lankan social activist, women's rights activist, motivational speaker, communications specialist, writer and Instagram personality. She currently works as a strategic communications manager at the Advocata Institute.

== Activism ==
She is well known campaigning for women's rights especially urging for the reduction of taxes on sanitary napkins in Sri Lanka. She has also been campaigning for the reducing of legal and regulatory barriers for the emergence of micro enterprises in Sri Lanka.

In 2020, she was included in Cosmopolitan magazine's "35 Under 35". In November 2020, she took part as one of the speakers in World Bank's virtual event on Road Safety in South Asia - Rethinking Urban Mobility amid COVID-19 pandemic.

Her efforts in eliminating taxes on sanitary products for women became successful as the Government of Sri Lanka announced that it would provide free sanitary napkins to schoolgirls as of January 2021 amid the COVID-19 pandemic in Sri Lanka.
