= Punchi Banda Nugawela =

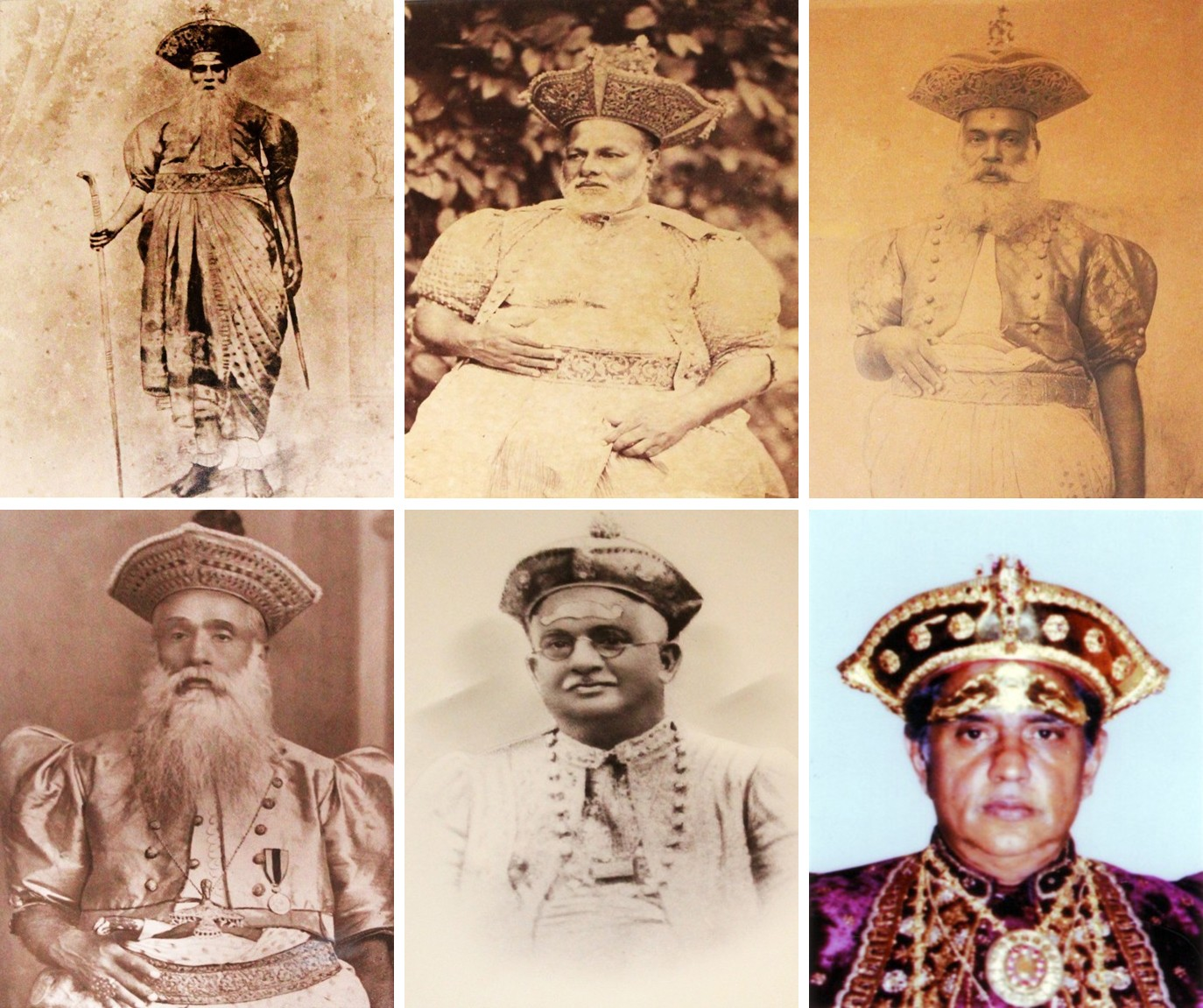
Punchi Banda Nugawela as Diyawadana Nilame Second Row, Center.

Punchi Banda Nugawela (known as P. B. Nugawela Dissawe) was a Ceylonese colonial-era legislator and headmen. He was a member of the State Council of Ceylon and Diyawadana Nilame from 1916–1937.

Joining the public service as a clerk, he was appointed Rate Mahatmaya of Sarasiyapattuwa. He was later given the titular rank of Dissawe by the British Governor of Ceylon. In the 1920s he became an influential member of the Kandyan National Assembly and was elected to the first State Council in 1931 from Galagedra.

He married first Mallika Dunuwila, the older daughter of Dunuwila Disawa and Police Magistrate. After her death, he married her younger sister Anula Dunuwila. His children were E. A. Nugawela, Hugh Nugawela, ate Mahatmaya of Sarasiya Pattu; Clifford Nugawela; Hilda Nugawela Kumarihamy; Muriel Nugawela Kumarihamy; Malkanthi Nugawela Kumarihamy; Nita Nugawela Kumarihamy; Pearl Nugawela Kumarihamy.

== See also ==
- Radala
- Diyawadana Nilame, Sri Dalada Maligawa, Kandy
