= H. R. U. Premachandra =

Ceylonese politician

Hapugoda Rankothge Udayaprema Premachandra (born 12 April 1910) was a Ceylonese politician.

Premachandra was elected as the second member in the Kadugannawa electorate at the 1st parliamentary election, held between 23 August 1947 and 20 September 1947, representing the United National Party, securing approximately 20% of the total vote, 5,586 votes ahead of his nearest rival.

Premachandra was one of the parliamentary members of the Kandyan Peasantry Commission, one of the first Royal Commissions established by the first post-Independence Prime Minister D. S. Senanayake in January 1949. The Commission was convened to investigate the social and economic life of the Kandyan peasantry in the Central and Uva Provinces and to determine what measures should be adopted to ameliorate their condition. He also served as the Parliamentary Secretary to the Minister of Home Affairs and Rural Development.

Premachandra was however unsuccessful at the subsequent 2nd parliamentary election held between 24 May 1952 and 30 May 1952, where while securing 21.8% of the vote, he failed to secure either seat in the Kadugannawa electorate.
