= St. Anthony's College, Kandy =

St. Anthony's College

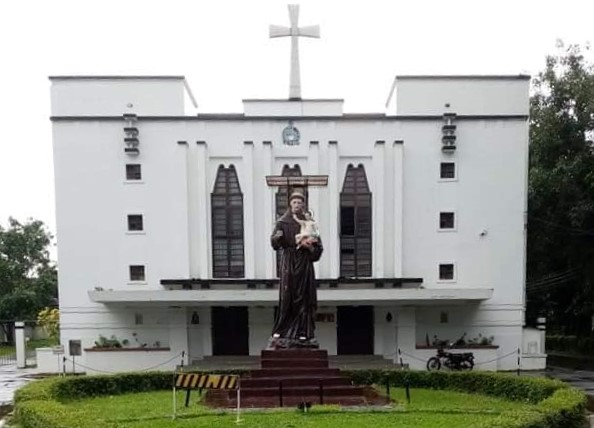
- Centenary Hall

Location
- Kandy; Sri Lanka; 7.322846°N 80.6281°E

Information
- Type: Roman Catholic (Semi Government School)
- Motto: Latin: Lux De Coelo (Light From Heaven)
- Religious affiliation: Roman Catholic
- Patron saint: Saint Anthony of Padua
- Established: 12 March 1854; 172 years ago
- Founder: Rev Fr Felice Alexander Zoppi
- Principal: Dushantha Perera
- Staff: 150
- Gender: Male
- Age: 6 to 19
- Enrollment: 3,000
- Colors: Maroon, Light blue and Dark blue
- Nickname: Eagles
- Affiliation: Roman Catholic Church
- Alumni: Old Antonians
- Website: www.sack.edu.lk

St. Anthony's College, Kandy (Sinhala: ශාන්ත අන්තෝනි විද්‍යාලය, Tamil: புனித அந்தோணியார் கல்லூரி) is a Roman Catholic School in Kandy, Sri Lanka. The college was established in 1854 by the Franciscan missionary, Felice Zoppi, although some sources point to a school established in 1844 and closed down the next year. The college is under the management of the Sylvestro Benedictine congregation and falls under the Diocese of Kandy. A number of notable individuals, including presidents, ministers, and parliamentarians have graduated from the college.

== History ==
=== The beginning ===
In 1820, the superior of all the Oratorians in Ceylon, Vincent de Rozairo, was the first missionary to Kandy. He erected a church, which occupied the same grounds where the present Scots Kirk stands. In 1828, the Scots Kirk site was found to be too small and hilly. A petition was submitted to the Governor, Sir Edward Barnes, who presented the petitioners with a new site. It was roughly a square 152 by 150 feet (46 m × 46 m) upon which the second Roman Catholic Church was built. This is the site on which St. Anthony's Cathedral stands today.

The order realised that churches alone would not contribute to the success of the missionary efforts. In September 1843, an Italian Oratorian, Orazio Bettacchini was sent to the Kandyan mission. During his missionary year, 1843/44, he opened a school in Kandy on the same premises. In August 1844, his successor, Andrew J. Reinaud, who continued as a missionary until 1848, began his missionary career by pulling down the school, which Bettacchini had erected.

In November 1853, Felice Zoppi, a Franciscan from the Chinese Missionary, was sent to Kandy by Joseph Maria Bravi to look into an issue with regard to a school erected before 1853. Then, as a result, Zoppi set about his task by opening two schools one for boys and another for girls in January 1854. Van Twest was appointed as the head teacher of the boys school by Zoppi. On 12 March 1854 Bravi sent a letter to Zoppi officially acknowledging the opening of both the schools, on the present premises of St. Anthony's Cathedral. It is said that Zoppi being a Franciscan, willed to name the school after the illustrious Franciscan Saint, Anthony of Padua. There is also evidence that the Church had been dedicated to St. Anthony at a much earlier date. At the inception 62 students were enrolled to the boys' school and 28 for the girls' school.

Paul Poorey took over the administration of the boys' school from Van Twest in 1855 contributing immensely to the growth of the school during its formative years. The absence of efficient missionaries to take over the school because it was a parish school, paved the way for a succession of laymen at the administration of the school until 1870. During this time the school arrived at its greater heights. Also in 1867, St. Anthony's Boys' School was identified as the second-best school in English among all the schools established by the missionaries.

In 1870, the Irish Christian Brothers took over the administration of the school for a short period and in 1871 the administration fell into the hands of laymen until 1875. It was in 1857 when Hilderbrand Vanderstraaten became the principal the Sylvestro Benedictine legacy began to grow around the history of St. Anthony's school. This event marked the entrusting of the administration and management of the school to Sylvestro Benedictine monks. Paul Perera succeeded Vanderstraaten in 1876. It is this year that boarding life was first introduced. The Girls School was shifted to Katukelle in 1887, where a convent was opened for Good Shepherd Nuns.

=== The first fifty years ===
In 1867, St. Anthony's Boys' School was referred as the "second best school in English" among all the schools established by the Missionaries. In 1870, the Irish Christian Brothers took over the administration of the school, temporarily.

In 1876, boarding life was first introduced. In 1879 secular teachers managed the school with R.P. Jansz as Head Master from 1880 to 1892, working with the Benedictine Fathers over a period of twelve years. The student population by 1887 had grown to 92, 5 of whom were boarders.

Leitan was the first, of an unbroken line of Benedictine priest-principals of the college, to date. During his six years in office, he had the services of a few other Benedictine monks: Hildebrand Georgesz, Patrick McKelvie, Dominic Direckze and Father Ryan.

In 1894, the premises known as "Philips Coffee Store", now a part of St. Sylvester's College was purchased by Abbot Pancrazi for the school.

=== The second fifty years ===
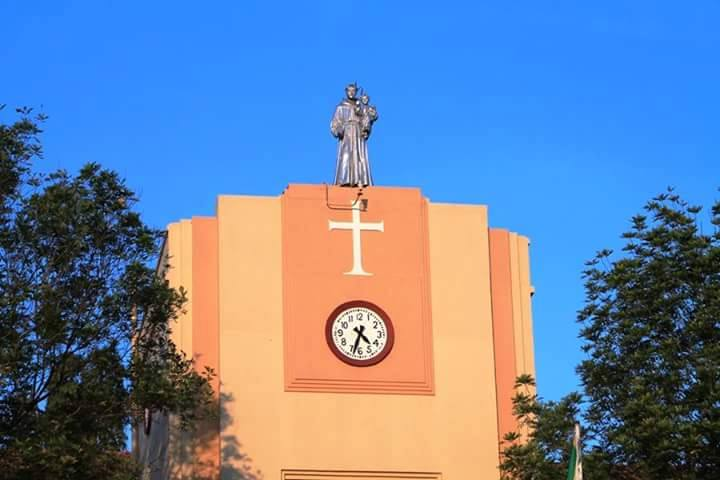
The Administration Building of the college

His successor, D. Philip Caspersz, was already a member of the teaching staff. After Caspersz assumed duties as principal, his brother, James came in as boarding prefect. These two brothers, in a comparatively short time changed the status of the school, making it a college.

The roll of students increased to 300 in 1908. The first College publication was released as St. Anthony's Manual in 1908. The newly equipped physical laboratory was dedicated in 1909. In 1910, Basil Hyde, an alumnus of the college and a staff member, summoned a meeting for Boxing Day 1910, at the college hall. This was the "First Annual General Meeting" of the St. Anthony's Old Boys' Association (OBA or alumni) was held. Bede Beekmeyer was elected the first president of the Association, proposed by Hyde himself.

In 1912, when Beekmeyer was consecrated as Bishop, Hyde succeeded him as President of the OBA. A total of 152 members had joined the association in its first two years. The first branch of the OBA was formed on 24 February 1912 as the "Uva Branch", with Craner as president. In November 1915, at the close of Basil Hyde's tenure, James, the brother of Philip Caspersz, was appointed principal.

William Gopallawa, the last Governor General of Ceylon and first President of Sri Lanka, is among the school's alumni.

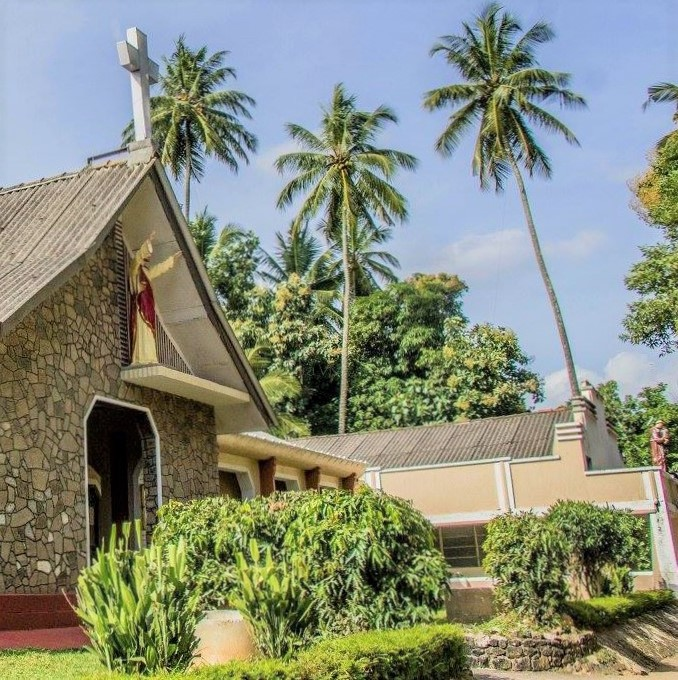
College Chapel

By this time the premises next to the cathedral had been fully developed with the student population topping one thousand. Several representations were made for the transfer of St. Anthony's from the cramped precincts to more spacious grounds. In 1927 Bishop Bede Beeckmeyer, an old boy, purchased the old Dunuwille Walauwa, the present premises of the college.

The plague hit Kandy by the end of 1927 and Lawrence Hyde shifted the junior boarders out of Kandy to Katugastota. The renovating and reconditioning of the new premises began in 1927. With drains all around, outer walls had to be bound to the grounds, the inner walls removed and replaced by pillars and the roof supported by trusses. Water service was installed and Titus lamps provided the lighting. The classes were housed in a shed made of coconut pillars, mango rafters, corrugated iron roof and wattle-and-daub dwarf walls. On 16 January 1928, the junior boarders were installed at Katugastota with a solemn planting of trees to commemorate the event. The verandah of the old walauwa served as a chapel.

In 1935, the main building block of the school was completed and its counterpart running parallel to it. These still stand. The hostellers, who had by then increased to about 150, had their dormitories upstairs in the main block. The Office, Hall, Library, and Chapel were on the ground floor. The smaller section behind consisted of a single storey, contained dining rooms and some classrooms. The playing field was gradually expanded to its present size. Fr. Robert Perera built the first Pavilion in 1935.

In 1941, the Kandy branch was officially separated from St. Anthony's College, established at Katugastota. A new school, St. Sylvester's College, was established with Perera as the first principal. World War II brought a British military occupation of the college. The total student population shrank to about 300 of which about 50 were boarders.

Sports had been sidelined for four years during military occupation of the college. When the military released the buildings and the playing field around 1946, one of the first innovations conceived by Theophane Wickramaratne, who led the return of the boys to the premises, was the adoption of a cottage system for hostel accommodation.

Wickramaratne was involved in the construction of other College buildings such as "The Rainbow Cottages", "The Tuck Shop", "The Chapel", "Mansion", "Villa", "Infirmary" and "The Refectory". Living in small groups, in separate cottages had not only provided a homey atmosphere, but also promoted greater fellowship and understanding. Rosati reconditioned several military huts into living quarters for the boarders and appointed school matrons to be in charge of the physical cleanliness of the boys and the sanitary features of each hostel block. This change had been so effectual in the achievement of greater performance both in work and play and led to a reduction of illness among the boarders.

The student population grew to nearly 1,600 with a teaching staff of 70. Classes were conducted in English, Sinhalese language and Tamil language for all subjects from Grade 1 to University Entrance.

=== The third fifty years ===
The Centenary Hall was funded by Alhaj Harideen of Madawala Bazaar. It was blessed by Bernard Regno, O.S.B., Bishop of Kandy and declared open by Governor General Sir Oliver Ernest Goonetilleke, C.M.E., on 5 September 1957. In 1961 the government took over the school. The government later permitted the college to continue, but wouldn't allow charging tuition.

In 1977, St. Anthony's changed its identity when the school was handed over to the government by the then Bishop of Kandy. The hostel was run independently of the school, by the Benedictine Fathers, who also had the income generating sections – the hall, the swimming pool and the tuck shop – under their jurisdiction. Prime Minister Ranasinghe Premadasa donated a two-story block of classrooms, which forms one wing of the school and is called the "Premadasa Block".

In 1982, the Colombo branch of the OBA undertook to develop an Indoor Sports and Pavilion Complex at the Katugastota grounds. However, with the communal troubles the country faced since 1983, raising funds became a difficult task up to about 1989. The project, the Bishop Leo Nanayakkara Sports and Pavilion Complex, was planned in three stages. The first stage consisting of a gymnasium, badminton and table tennis courts was finally completed in 1991 with the help of funds collected by the OBA and Fr. Stephen Abraham. In March 1992 this Sports Complex was opened by K.D.M.C. Bandara and handed over for use by the college. The College Diary was re-introduced in 1987 after a lapse of several years, and has continued to be published annually.

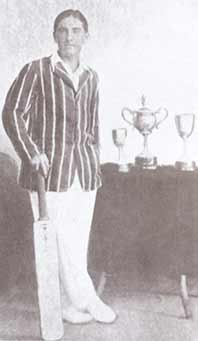
Jack Anderson: Antonian Cricketer

The second stage of the project, which consisted of accommodation for visiting teams, a sports pavilion and public stands was named Jack Anderson Pavilion, after the St. Anthony's cricketer. Fund raising for this stage was spearheaded by Fr. Abraham and Minister K.D.M.C. Bandara. A total sum of around 4 million rupees was raised through donations from parents, OBAs, well wishers, and from fund-raisers in Colombo and a carnival in Kandy. This effort enabled the building to take a shell-shape within a period of four months and was opened by Abraham in March 1993 to commemorate the 75th year of Jack Anderson's unbroken record of 291 runs in a school match against S. Thomas' College, Mt. Lavinia. The construction was completed in 1993, and has since, been used by the college as its main Pavilion. Work on the third and final stage of the complex commenced in 1994.

In 1989, Abraham celebrated his Sacerdotal Silver Jubilee (25 years of Priesthood) by building 25 houses for the minor staff naming the complex "Anthony Gammana", which is a model-housing scheme. The Department of Education in recognition of the success St. Anthony's had achieved under Fr. Stephen Abraham, approved the construction of a new three-storey block of buildings at a cost of 8 million rupees, in 1994.

The College Council, inaugurated in 1972, functioned continuously as the supreme body of decision making on matters pertaining to College within the frame of rules and regulations of the Department of Education. The Council consists of twelve members at present, headed by Fr. Principal and including Prefect of Discipline, Prefect of Games, Sectional Heads and Staff Guild President.

The Sports Council, which was formed subsequently, continues to govern on all matters relating to sports. Headed by Rev. Fr. Principal, the Council consists of Masters in Charge and Coaches each sport. The third and final stage of the "Bishop Leo Nanayakkara Sports and Pavilion Complex", was completed in 2000, with the Badminton Courts within the complex being upgraded with air-cushioned flooring in 1999, to accommodate National Tournaments. The three storeyed block in the upper school was completed in 2001.

The "Sesquicentennial Block" of classrooms in the quadrangular was completed with the assistance of parents of the upper school, in 2003. The Primary section too received a new block of four classrooms and a computer laboratory in 2002 with financial assistance from the Central Provincial Ministry. Computers and related equipment for the laboratory were obtained through funds collected by parents of the Primary section. A new 'Jubilee Building' was constructed for the Primary in 2003, through the collective efforts of the parents.

The Old Boys Association (SACKOBA), with Branches in Colombo, Nuwara Eliya, Australia, Canada and England, have provided financial support to the college. There is a "SACKOBA BALL", a dinner-dance organized by the Colombo Branch, to raise funds for its supportive activities each year.

== Past principals ==
| | Period | Name |
|---|---|---|
| 1st | 1854 – 1856 | Felice Zoppi (founder) - Italy |
| 2nd | 1856 – 1859 | Under supervision of Parish Priests, the school had a succession of laymen who functioned as administrators during this period. They were: Messrs Poorey, Peiris, De Silva, Fernando, A. Staples, Geddes and Paul. |
| 3rd | 1870 – 1871 | Irish Christian Brothers (Rev. Bros. John & Paul) |
| 4th | 1871 – 1872 | W. Hopp (Administrative Head) |
| 5th | 1872 – 1874 | J. Jorden (Administrative Head) |
| 6th | 1875 – 1876 | D. H. Vanderstraaten |
| 7th | 1876 – 1877 | Paul Perera |
| 8th | 1877 – 1879 | Maurus Craner |
| 9th | 1880 – 1892 | R. P. Jansz (Head Master) |
| 10th | 1892 – 1898 | D. H. Leitan |
| 11th | 1898 – 1906 | M. Craner |
| 12th | 1907 – 1914 | Philip Caspersz |
| 13th | 1915 – 1916 | Basil Hyde |
| 14th | 1916 – 1921 | James Caspersz |
| 15th | 1921 – 1943 | Lawrence Hyde |
| 16th | 1944 – 1957 | D. Rosati |
| 17th | 1957 – 1961 | Hilarion Rudolph |
| 18th | 1961 – 1967 | D. I. Robinson |
| 19th | 1968 – 1977 | Aidan DeSilva |
| 20th | 1977 – 1979 | D. Lanfranc Amerasinghe |
| 21st | 1979 – 1994 | Stephen Abraham |
| 22nd | 1994 – 2005 | Hilarion Fernando |
| 23rd | 2005 – 2013 | B. K. Titus Herbert Rodrigo |
| 24th | 2013–2026 | Henry Bernad Wijerathne |
| 25th | 2026- present | Dushantha Perera |

== Sports ==
Cricket was introduced in 1903, and a team known as 'St. Anthony's College Cricket Club' consisting of staff and school boys was formed under the Captaincy of Fr. Andrew. The inaugural match was played in Colombo versus Colombo Carlton Cricket Club. One of St. Anthony's notable rivals is another prestigious Catholic boys' school St. Joseph's College, Colombo and they compete for the "Murali-Vaas Trophy", which was inaugurated in 2007 and named after St. Anthony's alumnus Muttiah Muralitharan and St. Joseph's alumnus Chaminda Vaas. In 2012 the two schools celebrated their historic 100th encounter.

Rugby was introduced in 1957.

== Awards ==
- Bede Gold Medal – The "Bede Gold Medal" is the highest award that can be bestowed upon an Antonian. The medal, was originally presented by John Barnet Esq., in 1939, to the 'Most Outstanding All-Round Student' in memory of Right Reverend Bede Beeckmeyer, D.D., OSB, who purchased the site of the present home at Katugastota.

== See also ==
- Trinity-Antonian Cricket Encounter
- List of schools in Central Province, Sri Lanka
