= Hewaheta =

Coordinates: 7°06′N 80°46′E

Hewaheta හේවාහැට
- Village
- Interactive map of Hewaheta
- Country: Sri Lanka
- Province: Central Province
- Time zone: UTC+5:30 (Sri Lanka Standard Time)

Hewaheta is a village in Sri Lanka. It is located within Central Province.

== Notable people ==
Charles Spearman Armstrong (1847–1924) was a pioneer in growing tea and cinchona in Sri Lanka at the Rookwood plantation, near Hewaheta, from 1864. His grandson Neville Armstrong was born there.

== See also ==
- List of towns in Central Province, Sri Lanka
