= List of Sinhalese people =

This is a list of Sinhalese people by their country of domicile or origin. All communities that speak Sinhalese or spoke Sinhalese and originally came from Sri Lanka are included. Sinhalese are the majority ethnic group in Sri Lanka.

== Academics ==
- Professor Rohan Abeyaratne
- Gladys Jayawardene
- Professor Rohan Gunaratna
- Professor Sir Nicholas Attygalle
- Professor Nirmal Ranjith Dewasiri
- Professor Kapila Gunasekara
- Professor K. N. Jayatilleke
- Professor Sam Karunaratne
- Professor W.S. Karunaratne
- Professor G. L. Peiris
- Professor Walpola Rahula
- Professor V. K. Samaranayake
- Professor Ajith Kumar Siriwardena
- Professor Senaka Bibile
- Professor Nandadasa Kodagoda

== Activists ==
- Ajith C. S. Perera
- Shantha Bandara

== Actors and actresses ==
- Joe Abeywickrama
- Gamini Fonseka
- Malini Fonseka
- Tony Jayawardena
- Henry Jayasena
- Vijaya Kumaratunga
- Tony Ranasinghe
- Ravindra Randeniya
- Iranganie Serasinghe
- Yashoda Wimaladharma

== Archaeologists and anthropologists ==
- S. U. Deraniyagala
- Senarat Paranavithana
- Ellawala Medhananda Thero

== Architects and civil engineers ==
- Minnette De Silva
- Oliver Weerasinghe
- U. N. Gunasekera
- A. N. S. Kulasinghe

== Authors ==
- W. A. Silva
- Martin Wickramasinghe
- Karunasena Jayalath
- Lionel de Fonseka

== Aviators ==
- J.P. Obeyesekere III
- Monath Perera
- Ray Wijewardene

== Broadcasters ==
- Karunaratne Abeysekera
- Vernon Corea
- Vijaya Corea
- Owen de Abrew
- A.W. Dharmapala
- Eric Fernando
- Prosper Fernando
- H.M. Gunasekera
- Thevis Guruge
- Shirley Perera
- Seelaratne Senarath
- Livy Wijemanne

== Buddhist monks ==
- Balangoda Ananda Maitreya Thero
- Gangodawila Soma Thero
- Hikkaduwe Sri Sumangala Thera
- Kadawedduwe Jinavamsa Mahathera
- Katukurunde Nanananda Thera
- Kiribathgoda Gnanananda Thero
- Kithalagama Sri Seelalankara Thera
- Madihe Pannaseeha Thero
- Mapalagama Wipulasara Maha Thera
- Matara Sri Nanarama Mahathera
- Matara Sri Nanarama Mahathera
- Migettuwatte Gunananda Thera
- Narada Maha Thera
- Päläne Vajirañāna Thero
- Piyadassi Maha Thera
- Polwatte Buddhadatta Thera
- Ratmalane Sri Dharmaloka Thera
- Rerukane Chandawimala Thero
- Thibbatuwawe Sri Siddhartha Sumangala Thero
- Thotagamuwe Sri Rahula Thera
- Udugama Sri Buddharakkitha Thero
- Weligama Sri Sumangala Thero
- Weliwita Sri Saranankara Thero
- Weweldeniye Medhalankara Thero

== Civil servants ==
- Hamilton Shirley Amerasinghe
- Bradman Weerakoon
- Sanath Weerakoon

== Clergy ==
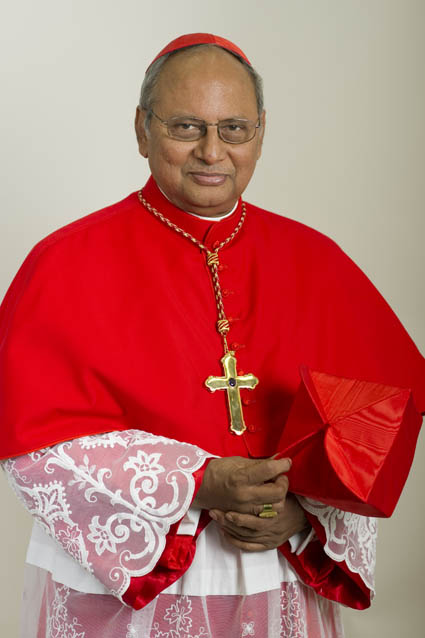
Cardinal Malcolm Ranjith

- Cyril Abeynaike, 10th bishop of Colombo (Anglican)
- Tissa Balasuriya (Catholic)
- Cardinal Thomas Cooray, 8th archbishop of Colombo
- Ivan Corea (Anglican)
- Duleep de Chickera, 14th bishop of Colombo (Anglican)
- Lakdasa De Mel, 1st bishop of Kurunegala (Anglican)
- Lynn de Silva (Methodist)
- Harold de Soysa, 9th bishop of Colombo (Anglican)
- Frank Marcus Fernando, 3rd bishop of the Roman Catholic Diocese of Chilaw
- Nicholas Marcus Fernando (1932-2020), Roman Catholic Archbishop of Colombo from 1977 to 2002
- Kenneth Fernando, 13th bishop of Colombo (Anglican)
- Swithin Fernando, 11th bishop of Colombo (Anglican)
- Oswald Gomis, 10th archbishop of Roman Catholic Archdiocese of Colombo
- Kumara Illangasinghe, 4th bishop of Kurunegala (Anglican)
- Marcelline Jayakody (Catholic)
- Andrew Kumarage, 3rd bishop of Colombo (Anglican)
- Valence Mendis, current bishop of the Roman Catholic Diocese of Chilaw
- Edmund Peiris (1897-1989), Bishop of Chilaw from 1940 to 1972, President of the Royal Asiatic Society of Sri Lanka from 1959 to 1961
- Elmo Noel Joseph Perera, 5th bishop of the Roman Catholic Diocese of Galle
- Aloysius Pieris, Jesuit Catholic priest
- Ernest Poruthota (1931-2020), Roman Catholic priest and author
- Cardinal Malcolm Ranjith, current archbishop of Colombo (Catholic)
- Lakshman Wickremasinghe, 2nd bishop of Kurunegala (Anglican)

== Composers and conductors ==
- Rohan Joseph de Saram
- Dilup Gabadamudalige
- Rohana Weerasinghe
- Premasiri Kemadasa
- Sarath Dasanayaka
- W. D. Amaradeva
- Sunil Shantha
- Sarath De Alwis

== Corporate leaders ==
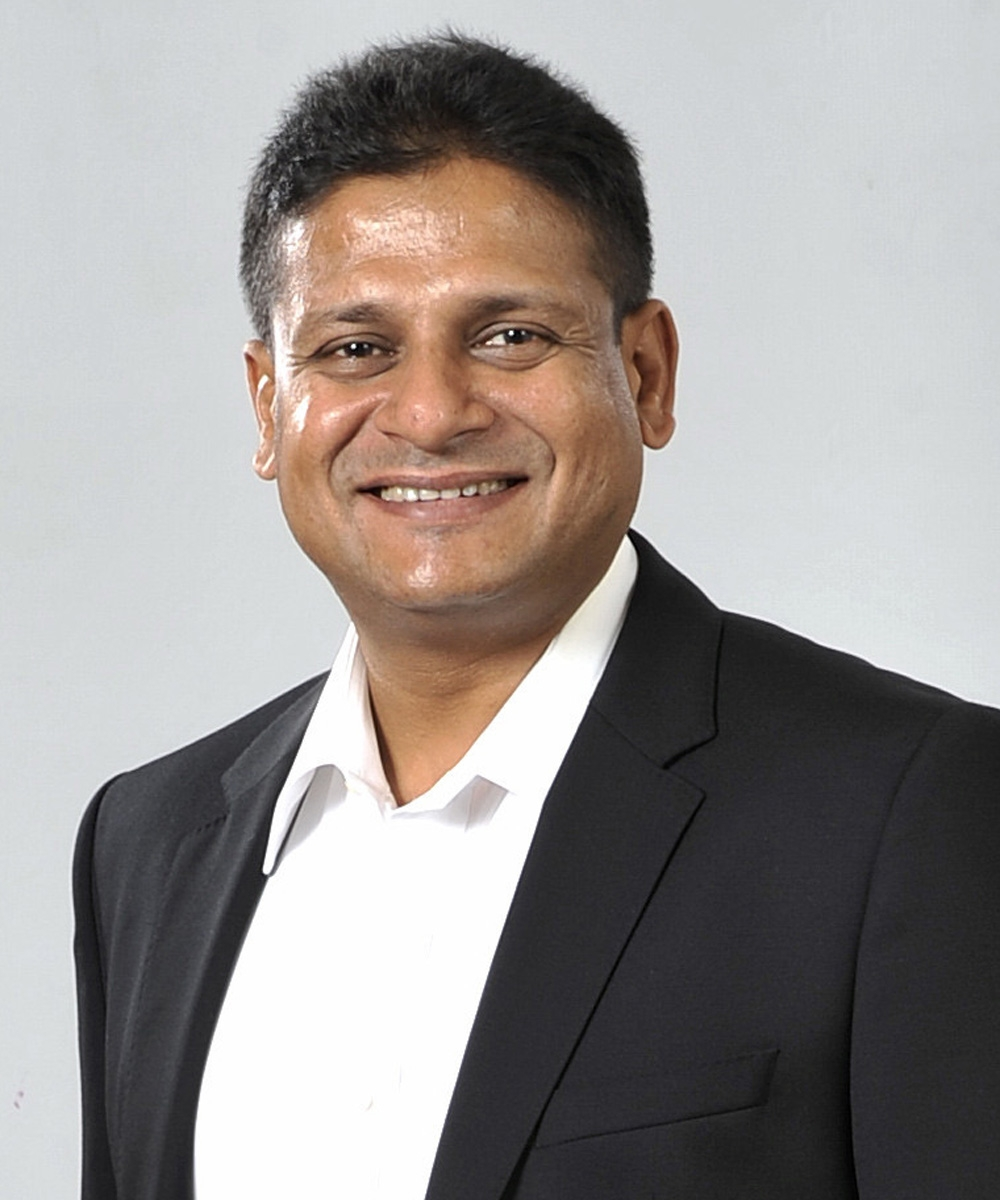
Dilith Jayaweera

- Dilith Jayaweera

== Diplomats ==
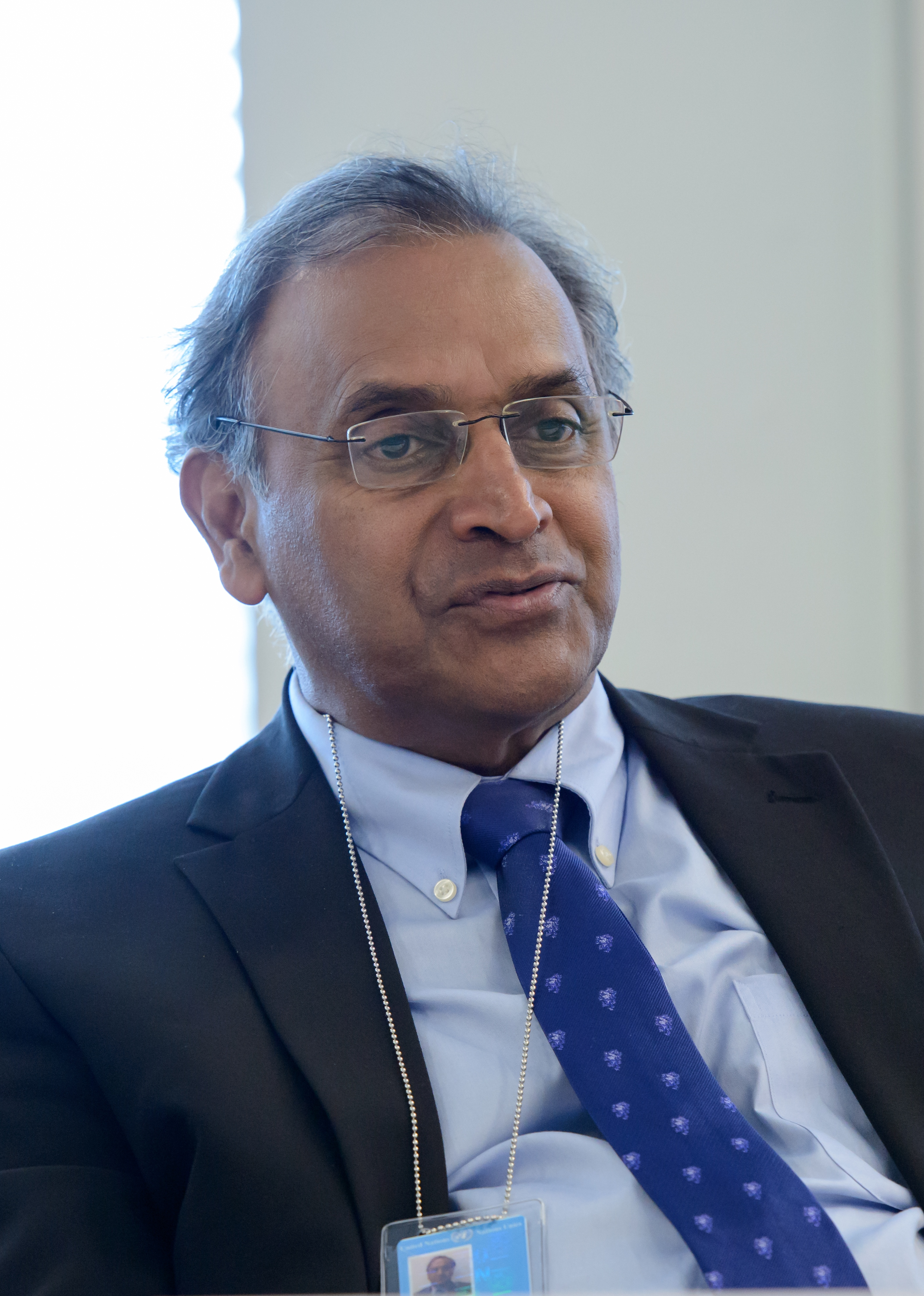
Jayantha Dhanapala

- Jayantha Dhanapala
- Neville Kanakeratne
- Vernon Mendis
- Bernard Tilakaratna

== Economists ==
- Gamani Corea
- N. U. Jayawardena
- W. D. Lakshman
- Dr. H.M. Gunasekera (economist)

== Fashion ==
- Otara Gunewardene
- Ruchira Silva

== Filmmakers ==
- Dharmasiri Bandaranayake
- Andrew Jayamanne
- Vasantha Obeysekera
- Dharmasena Pathiraja
- Lester James Peries
- Sumitra Peries
- Titus Thotawatte
- Prasanna Vithanage
- Malaka Dewapriya

== Freedom agitators and martyrs ==
- Puran Appu
- Gongalegoda Banda
- Ven. Anagarika Dharmapala
- Gratien Fernando
- Captain D.E. Henry Pedris
- Sir James Peiris
- Keerthi Vijayabahu

== Industrialists ==
- Sir Ernest de Silva
- Sir Charles Henry de Soysa
- Andiris Perera Dharmagunawardhana
- Daya Gamage
- U.N. Gunasekera
- Don Carolis Hewavitharana
- Harry Jayawardena
- Dhammika Perera
- Phillip Upali Wijewardena

== Journalists ==
- Ernest Corea
- Seelaratne Senarath

== Judges ==
=== Supreme court ===
- A. W. H. Abeyesundere (1906–1988)
- Janak de Silva
- Gihan Kulatunga
- K. M. M. B. Kulatunga (died 2010)
- Andrew Ranjan Perera
- Christopher Weeramantry (1926–2017)

=== Appeal court ===
- Mayadunne Corea
- Sarath Dissanayake
- K. Priyantha Fernando
- Dhammika Ganepola
- Mahen Gopallawa
- Ratnapriya Gurusinghe
- Pradeep Hettiarachchi
- Sriyanath Karalliyadde
- Sumudu Premachandra
- Amal Ranaraja

== Legal ==
Parinda Ranasinghe Jr.

== Military personnel ==
=== Air Force ===
- Marshal of the air force Roshan Goonatilake
- Air Chief Marshal Harry Goonatilake
- Air Chief Marshal Paddy Mendis
- Air Chief Marshal G. Donald Perera
- Air Chief Marshal Jayalath Weerakkody
- Air Vice Marshal E. R. Amarasekara
- Air Commodore Shirantha Goonatilake

=== Army ===
- Field Marshal Sarath Fonseka
- General D. S. Attygalle
- General G. H. De Silva
- General Denis Perera
- General Nalin Seneviratne
- General T. I. Weerathunga
- Lieutenant General Jagath Jayasuriya
- Lieutenant General Denzil Kobbekaduwa
- Lieutenant General Parami Kulatunga
- Lieutenant General Shavendra Silva
- Major General Janaka Perera
- Major General Vijaya Wimalaratne
- Colonel Fredrick C. de Saram
- Lieutenant Colonel Lalith Jayasinghe
- Captain Saliya Upul Aladeniya
- Second Lieutenant K. W. T. Nissanka
- Warrant Officer 2nd Class H.B. Pasan Gunasekera
- Corporal Gamini Kularatne

=== Navy ===
- Admiral of the fleet Wasantha Karannagoda
- Admiral Clancy Fernando
- Admiral D.B. Goonesekara
- Vice Admiral Asoka de Silva
- Rear Admiral Rohan Amarasinghe
- Rear Admiral Royce de Mel
- Rear Admiral Mohan Jayamaha

== Monarchs and royalty ==
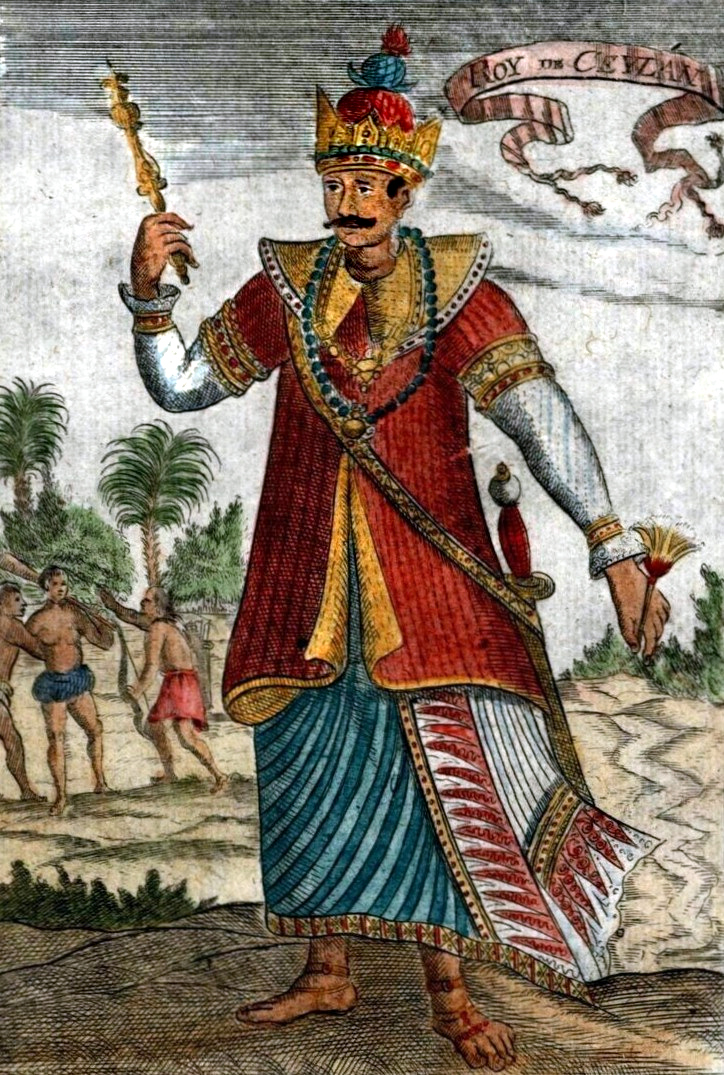
Vimaladharmasuriya I of Kandy

- King Vijaya Sinhala
- King Pandukabhaya
- King Devanampiyatissa
- King Dutugemunu
- King Gajabahu I
- King Parâkramabâhu I
- King Vijaya
- King Vikkamabahu
- King Vimala Dharma Surya I
- Queen Anula
- Queen Lilavati
- Rani Padmini

== Musicians and singers ==
- W. D. Amaradeva
- Sujatha Aththanayaka
- Bathiya and Santhush
- Arjun
- Victor Rathnayake
- Sunil Shantha
- Ananda Samarakoon
- Sunil Perera
- Yohani De Silva
- Iraj Weeraratne
- DeLon
- Sunil Edirisinghe
- Shihan Mihiranga Bennet
- Ajith Bandara
- Lakshman Joseph de Saram
- C. T. Fernando
- M. S. Fernando
- Rookantha Gunathilake
- Edward Jayakody
- Eddie Jayamanne
- T. M. Jayaratne
- Nalin Jayawardena
- H. R. Jothipala
- Gunadasa Kapuge
- Kamal Addararachchi
- Premasiri Khemadasa
- Vijaya Kumaranatunga
- Ranidu Lankage
- Annesley Malewana
- Milton Mallawarachchi
- Nimal Mendis
- Sanath Nandasiri
- Nihal Nelson
- Keerthi Pasquel
- Stanley Peiris
- Lionel Ranwala
- Freddie Silva
- Priya Suriyasena
- Dharmadasa Walpola
- Latha Walpola
- Clarence Wijewardena
- Nissanka Wimalasuriya

== Painters ==
- Solias Mendis
- David Paynter
- M. Sarlis
- George Kit

== Philosophers ==
- Nalin de Silva
- K. N. Jayatilleke
- David Kalupahana

== Policemen ==
- Cyril Dissanayake
- T.B. Kehelgamuwa

== Politicians ==
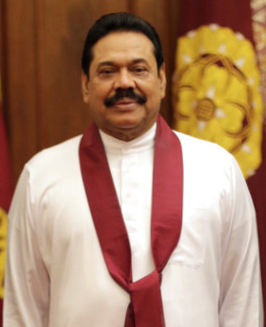
Mahinda Rajapaksa

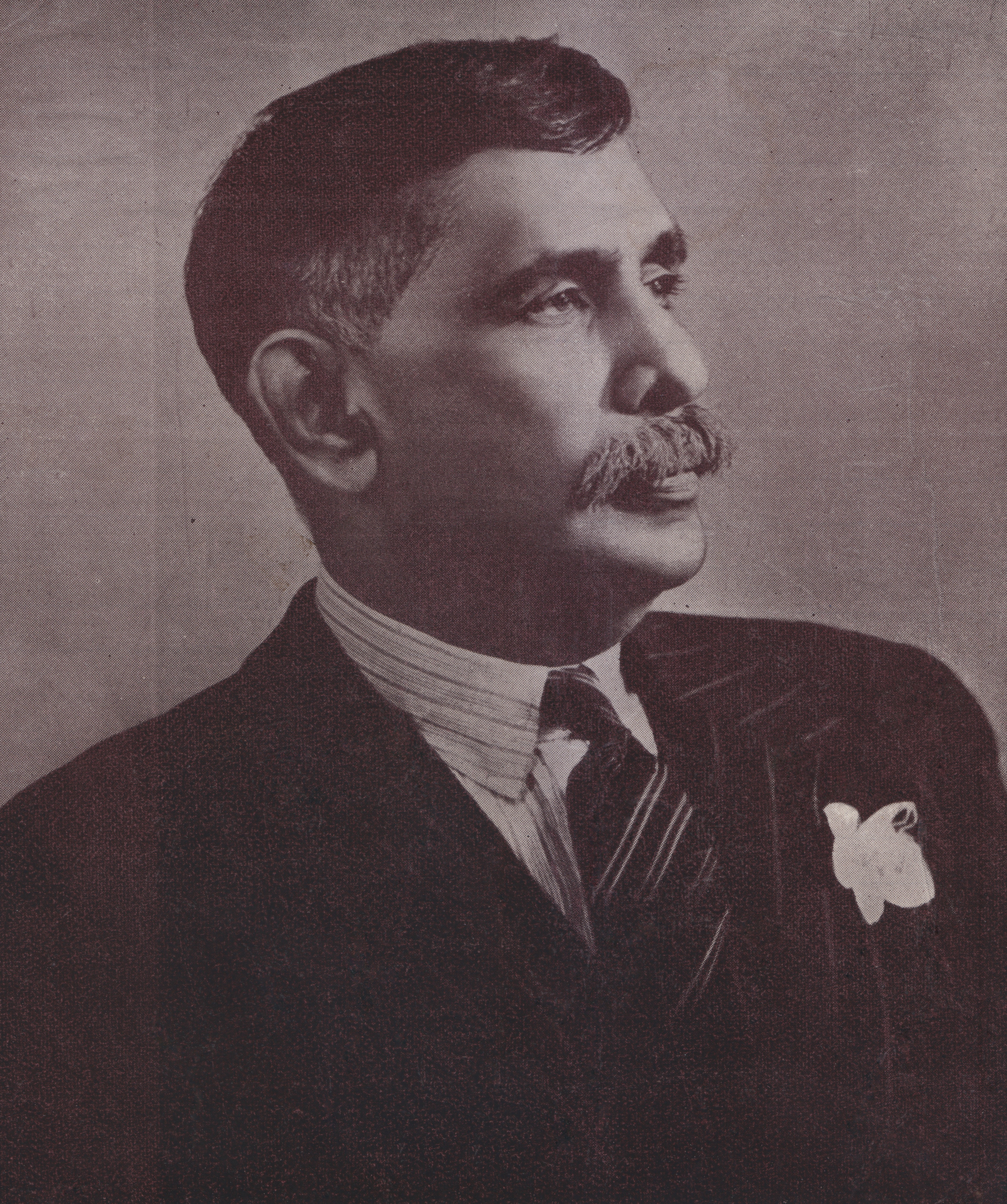
D. S. Senanayake

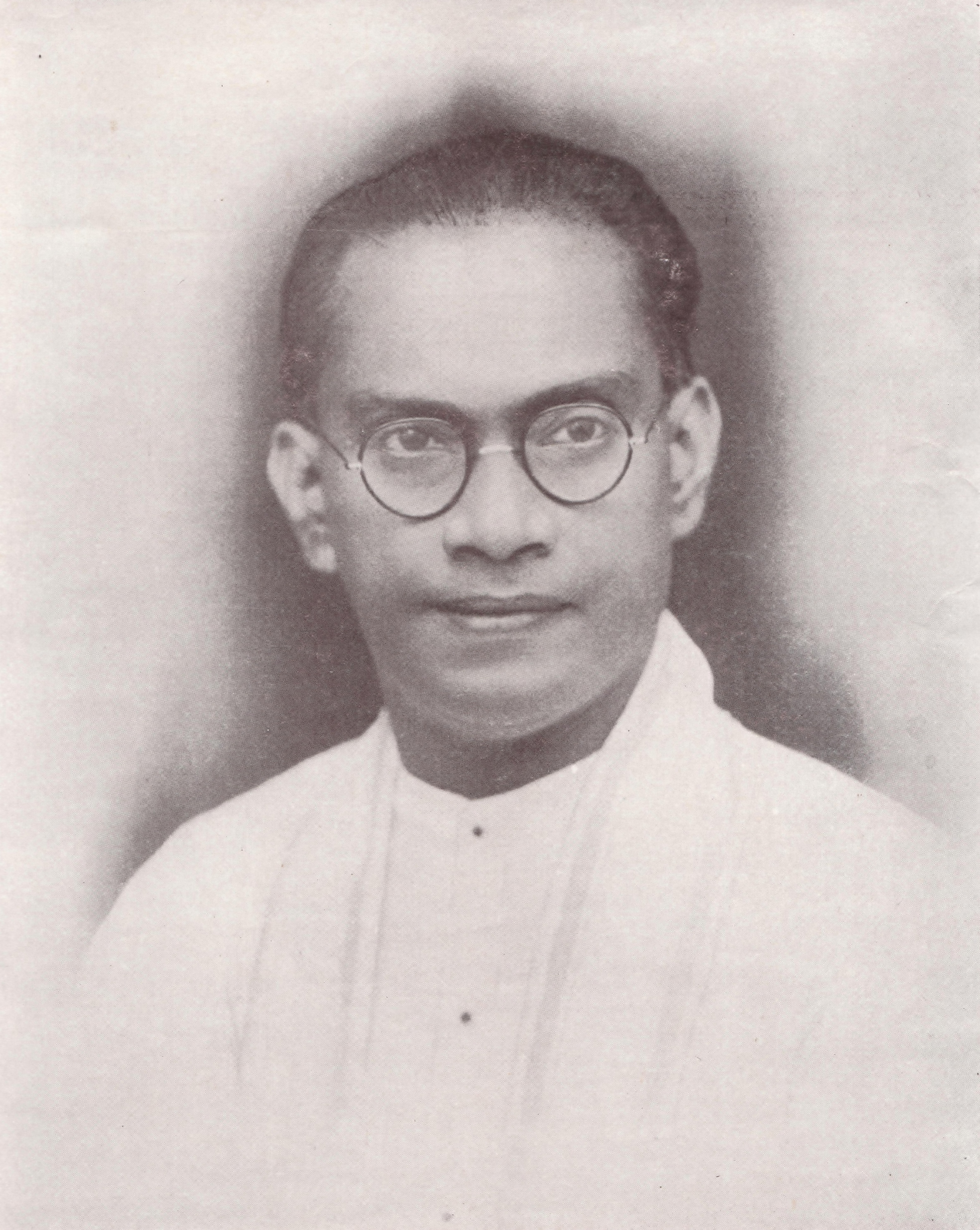
S. W. R. D. Bandaranaike

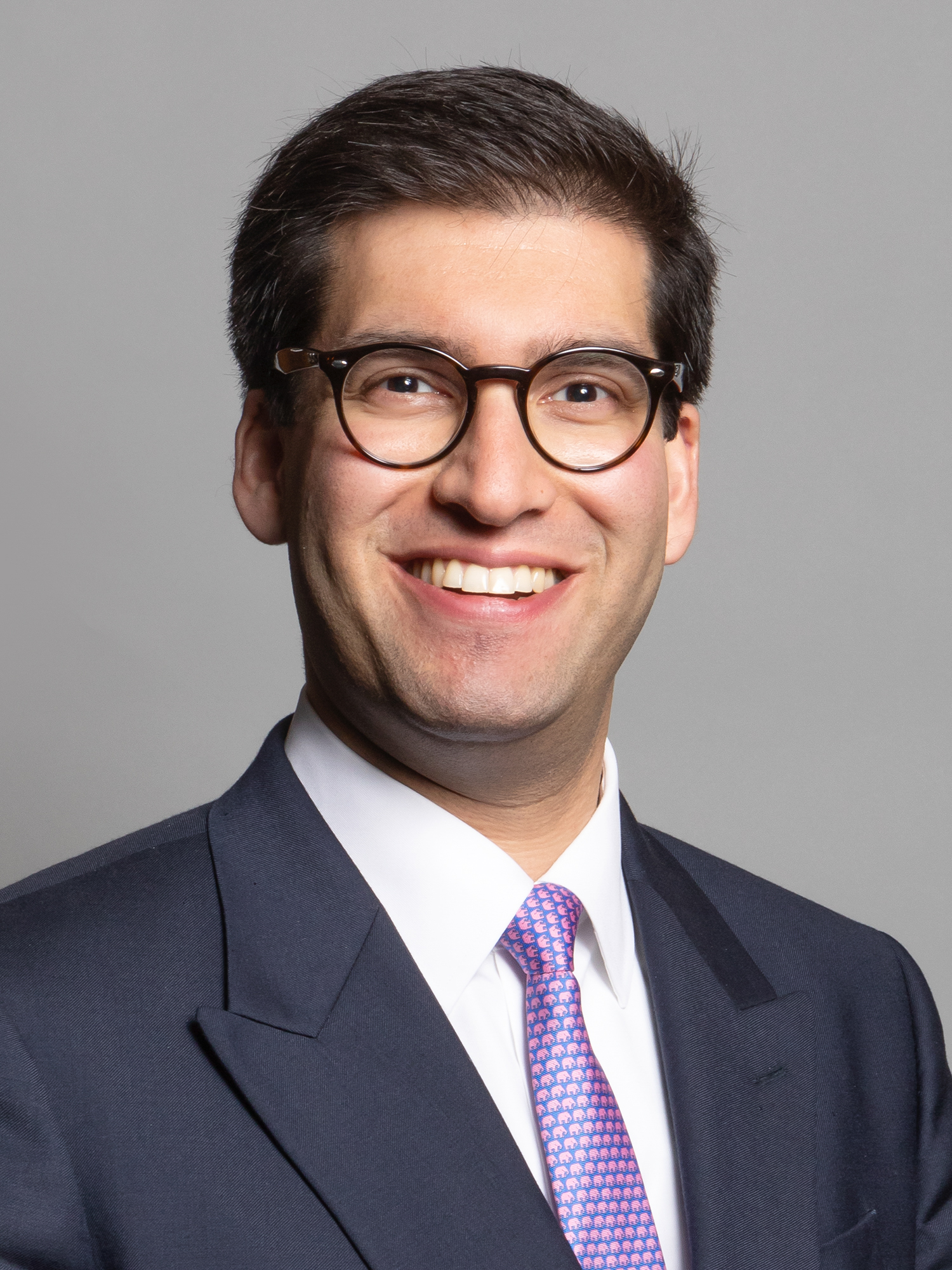
Ranil Jayawardena

- Lalith Athulathmudali
- Anura Bandaranaike
- Felix Dias Bandaranaike
- Sirimavo Bandaranaike
- Solomon Bandaranaike
- Dr Colvin R de Silva
- William de Silva
- Gamini Dissanayake
- Amarasiri Dodangoda
- Vivienne Goonewardena
- Monty Gopallawa
- William Gopallawa
- C.V. Gunaratne
- Dinesh Gunawardena
- Tyronne Fernando
- Sirisena Hettige
- I. M. R. A. Iriyagolla
- Junius Richard Jayewardene
- C.W.W. Kannangara
- Sir John Kotelawala
- Karunasena Kodituwakku
- Chandrika Kumaratunga
- Cyril Mathew
- Anil Moonesinghe
- Jude Perera
- N.M. Perera
- Ranasinghe Premadasa
- Mahinda Rajapaksa
- Mahinda Samarasinghe
- Mangala Samaraweera
- Don Stephen Senanayake
- Dudley Senanayake
- Maithripala Senanayake
- Rosy Senanayake
- Maithripala Sirisena
- I. J. Wickrema
- Ratnasiri Wickremanayake
- Doreen Wickremasinghe
- Ranil Wickremesinghe
- Ranjan Wijeratne
- Dingiri Banda Wijetunge
- Ranil Jayawardena
- Rohana Wijeweera
- Noel Wimalasena

== Scientists ==
- Professor Chandre Dharma-wardana
- Dr Sarath Gunapala
- Professor Mohan Munasinghe
- Dr Cyril Ponnamperuma
- Professor Chandra Wickramasinghe
- Malik Peiris
- Charith Mendis
- Professor Ananda Amarasekara

== Sportspeople ==
=== Racing ===
- Ananda Wedisinghe
- Dilantha Malagamuwa

=== Athletics ===
- Sriyantha Dissanayake
- Damayanthi Dharsha
- Susanthika Jayasinghe
- Dinesh Priyantha
- Himasha Eashan
- Pradeep Sanjaya
- Dulan Kodithuwakku
- Yupun Abeykoon

=== Cricket ===
- Marvan Atapattu
- Aravinda de Silva
- Martin de Silva
- Gamini Goonesena
- Churchill Gunasekara
- Asanka Gurusinha
- Douglas Dias Jayasinha
- Sanath Jayasuriya
- Mahela Jayawardene
- Ranjan Madugalle
- Lasith Malinga
- Roshan Mahanama
- Arjuna Ranatunga
- Kumar Sangakkara
- Chaminda Vaas
- Bandula Warnapura

=== Swimming ===
- Matthew Abeysinghe
- Kyle Abeysinghe
- Cherantha de Silva

== Technologists ==
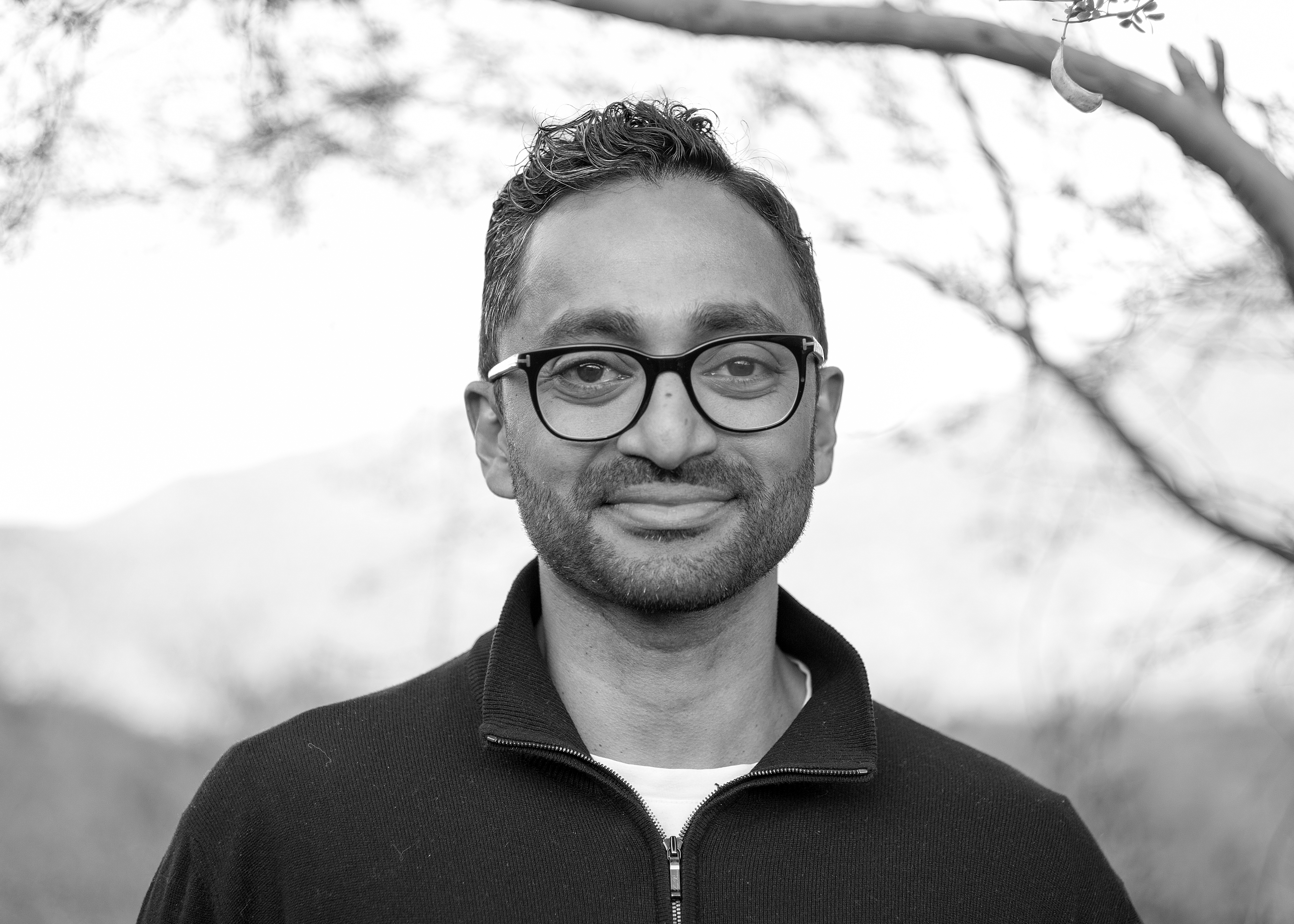
Chamath Palihapitiya

- Chamath Palihapitiya

== Trade unionists ==
- Siritunga Jayasuriya
- I. J. Wickrema

== Writers ==
- Shehan Karunatilaka
- Gunadasa Amarasekara
- Sugathapala de Silva
- Brendon Gooneratne
- Regi Siriwardena

== See also ==
- List of Sri Lankans
- Sinhalese people
