= List of judges of the Court of Appeal of Sri Lanka =

This is a list of presidents and judges of the Court of Appeal of Sri Lanka. They are listed in the order in which they took the judicial oath of office and commenced their term.

== Presidents of the Court of Appeal ==
As of 19 June 2025

List of Presidents of the Court of Appeal
No.	Name	Appointed by	Start / end / length of service	Ref.
1	D. Wimalaratne	Jayewardene	7 September 1978 – 14 October 1980; 2 years, 37 days	
2	Barnes Ratwatte II	Jayewardene	15 October 1980 – 10 April 1981; 177 days	
3	P. Colin-Thome	Jayewardene	11 April – 28 December 1981; 261 days	
4	J. F. A. Soza	Jayewardene	29 December 1981 – 25 January 1982; 27 days	
5	K. A. P. Ranasinghe	Jayewardene	26 January – 14 November 1982; 292 days	
6	M. M. Abdul Cader	Jayewardene	15 November – 1 December 1982; 16 days	
7	E. A. D. Athukorale	Jayewardene	2 December 1982 – 26 November 1984; 1 year, 360 days	
8	O. S. M. Seneviratne	Jayewardene	27 November 1984 – 9 February 1986; 1 year, 74 days	
9	G. P. S. De Silva	Jayewardene	10 February 1986 – 16 December 1987; 1 year, 309 days	
10	J. S. Abeywardena	Jayewardene	17 December 1987 – 21 February 1988; 66 days	
11	G. R. T. D. Bandaranayake	Jayewardene	22 February 1988 – 3 March 1989; 1 year, 9 days	
12	R. N. M. Dheeraratne	Premadasa	3 April 1988 – 2 April 1989; 1 year, 29 days	
13	P. Ramanathan	Premadasa	3 April – 24 August 1989; 143 days	
14	S. B. Gunawardena	Premadasa	25 August 1989 – 15 October 1990; 1 year, 51 days	
15	P. R. P. Perera	Premadasa	16 October 1990 – 27 August 1991; 315 days	
16	A. S. Wijetunga	Premadasa	29 August – 16 October 1991; 48 days	
17	K. Palakidnar	Premadasa	17 October 1991 – 20 January 1994; 2 years, 95 days	
18	Sarath N. Silva	Wijetunga	21 January 1994 – 28 September 1995; 1 year, 250 days	
19	S. Anandacoomaraswamy	Kumaratunga	2 October 1995 – 8 April 1996; 189 days	
20	Asoka De Zoysa Gunawardana	Kumaratunga	10 April – 9 December 1996; 243 days	
21	D. P. S. Gunasekara	Kumaratunga	10 December 1996 – 6 October 1997; 300 days	
22	L. H. G. Weerasekera	Kumaratunga	7 October 1997 – 30 June 1998; 266 days	
23	Ameer Ismail	Kumaratunga	1 July 1998 – 30 May 1999; 333 days	
24	Punyadasa Edussuriya	Kumaratunga	1 June 1999 – 14 September 2000; 1 year, 105 days	
25	H. S. Yapa	Kumaratunga	15 September 2000 – 27 January 2001; 134 days	
26	C. V. Vigneswaran	Kumaratunga	28 January – 18 February 2001; 21 days	
27	Asoka de Silva	Kumaratunga	19 February – 1 August 2001; 163 days	
28	U. De Z Gunawardana	Kumaratunga	2–14 August 2001; 12 days	
29	T. B. Weerasuriya	Kumaratunga	15 August 2001 – 28 May 2002; 286 days	
30	Chandra Nihal Jayasinghe	Kumaratunga	29 May 2002 – 23 January 2003; 239 days	
31	Shiranee Tilakawardane	Kumaratunga	24 January – 24 November 2003; 304 days	
32	N. K. Udalagama	Kumaratunga	25 November 2003 – 24 March 2004; 120 days	
33	Saleem Marsoof	Kumaratunga	31 March 2004 – 19 January 2005; 294 days	
34	Andrew Somawansa	Kumaratunga	20 January 2005 – 28 May 2006; 1 year, 128 days	
35	D. J. De S. Balapatabendi	M. Rajapaksa	29 May – 12 December 2006; 197 days	
36	P. Wijeratne	M. Rajapaksa	13 December 2006 – 26 February 2007; 75 days	
37	K. Sripavan	M. Rajapaksa	27 February 2007 – 26 March 2008; 1 year, 28 days	
38	Chandra Ekanayake	M. Rajapaksa	27 March – 30 October 2008; 217 days	
39	Sathya Hettige	M. Rajapaksa	31 October 2008 – 9 June 2011; 2 years, 221 days	
40	S. Sriskandarajah	M. Rajapaksa	24 June 2011 – 23 January 2014; 2 years, 213 days	
41	Sisira de Abrew	M. Rajapaksa	26 February – 6 May 2014; 69 days	
42	A. W. A. Salam	M. Rajapaksa	9 June – 4 September 2014; 87 days	
43	Vijith Malalgoda	M. Rajapaksa	9 September 2014 – 9 May 2017; 2 years, 242 days	
44	P. R. Walgama	Sirisena	10 May – 17 June 2017; 38 days	
45	Lalith Dehideniya	Sirisena	18 June 2017 – 14 January 2018; 210 days	
46	Padman Surasena	Sirisena	15 January 2018 – 9 January 2019; 359 days	
47	Yasantha Kodagoda	Sirisena	28 March 2019 – 2 February 2020; 311 days	
48	Dilip Nawaz	G. Rajapaksa	3 February – 30 November 2020; 301 days	
49	Arjuna Obeyesekere	G. Rajapaksa	1 December 2020 – 13 June 2021; 194 days	
50	Priyantha Fernando	G. Rajapaksa	14 June 2021 – 5 February 2023; 1 year, 236 days	
51	Bandula Karunarathna	Wickremesinghe	6 February 2023 – 16 June 2025; 2 years, 130 days	(Note: On pre-retirement leave from 2 February to 16 June 2025.)
52	Rohantha Abeysooriya	Dissanayake	19 June 2025 – present 1 year, 109 days	

== Judges of the Court of Appeal ==
Current President of the Court
Current Judges

As of 6 October 2026

List of Judges appointed to the Court of Appeal
No.	Name	Appointed by	Start / end / length of service		Ref.
No.	Name	Appointed by	Judge	President of the Court	Ref.
1	D. Wimalaratne	Jayewardene		1st President; 7 September 1978 – 14 October 1980; 2 years, 37 days	
2	Barnes Ratwatte II	Jayewardene		2nd President; 15 October 1980 – 10 April 1981; 177 days	
3	A. Vythialingam	Jayewardene		—N/a	
4	P. Colin-Thome	Jayewardene		3rd President; 11 April – 28 December 1981; 261 days	
5	J. F. A. Soza	Jayewardene		4th President; 29 December 1981 – 25 January 1982; 27 days	
6	K. A. P. Ranasinghe	Jayewardene		5th President; 26 January – 14 November 1982; 292 days	
7	M. M. Abdul Cader	Jayewardene		6th President; 15 November – 1 December 1982; 16 days	
8	K. C. E. De Alwis	Jayewardene		—N/a	
9	R. Victor Perera	Jayewardene		—N/a	
10	E. A. D. Athukorale	Jayewardene		7th President; 2 December 1982 – 26 November 1984; 1 year, 360 days	
11	H. Rodrigo	Jayewardene		—N/a	
12	Herbert Thambiah	Jayewardene		—N/a	
13	L. H. De Alwis	Jayewardene		—N/a	
14	O. S. M. Seneviratne	Jayewardene		8th President; 27 November 1984 – 9 February 1986; 1 year, 74 days	
15	H. A. G. De Silva	Jayewardene		—N/a	
16	B. E. De Silva	Jayewardene		—N/a	
17	G. P. S. De Silva	Jayewardene		9th President; 10 February 1986 – 16 December 1987; 1 year, 309 days	
18	J. S. Abeywardena	Jayewardene		10th President; 17 December 1987 – 21 February 1988; 66 days	
19	Siva Selliah	Jayewardene		—N/a	
20	C. L. T. Moonemalle	Jayewardene		—N/a	
21	T. D. G. De Alwis	Jayewardene		—N/a	
22	G. R. T. D. Bandaranayake	Jayewardene		11th President; 22 February 1988 – 3 March 1989; 1 year, 9 days	
23	D. G. Jayalath	Jayewardene		—N/a	
24	M. Jameel	Jayewardene		—N/a	
25	R. N. M. Dheeraratne	Jayewardene		12th President; 3 April 1988 – 2 April 1989; 1 year, 29 days	
26	P. Ramanathan	Jayewardene		13th President; 3 April – 24 August 1989; 143 days	
27	S. B. Gunawardena	Jayewardene		14th President; 25 August 1989 – 15 October 1990; 1 year, 51 days	
28	P. R. P. Perera	Jayewardene		15th President; 16 October 1990 – 27 August 1991; 315 days	
29	A. S. Wijetunga	Jayewardene		16th President; 29 August – 16 October 1991; 48 days	
30	T. N. Abeywira	Jayewardene		—N/a	
31	K. Viknarajah	Jayewardene		—N/a	
32	K. Palakidnar	Jayewardene		17th President; 17 October 1991 – 20 January 1994; 2 years, 95 days	
33	Sarath N. Silva	Jayewardene		18th President; 21 January 1994 – 28 September 1995; 1 year, 250 days	
34	S. Anandacoomaraswamy	Jayewardene		19th President; 2 October 1995 – 8 April 1996; 189 days	
35	W. N. D. Perera	Jayewardene		—N/a	
36	Asoka De Zoysa Gunawardana	Jayewardene		20th President; 10 April – 9 December 1996; 243 days	
37	S.J.D. De S. Wijeratne			—N/a	
38	D. P. S. Gunasekara			21st President; 10 December 1996 – 6 October 1997; 300 days	
39	H. W. Senanayake			—N/a	
40	L. H. G. Weerasekera			22nd President; 7 October 1997 – 30 June 1998; 266 days	
41	Ameer Ismail	Premadasa		23rd President; 1 July 1998 – 30 May 1999; 333 days	
42	C. A. O. Grego			—N/a	
43	Punyadasa Edussuriya			24th President; 1 June 1999 – 14 September 2000; 1 year, 105 days	
44	R. B. Ranaraja			—N/a	
45	H. S. Yapa			25th President; 15 September 2000 – 27 January 2001; 134 days	
46	F. N. D. Jayasuriya			—N/a	
47	C. V. Vigneswaran	Kumaratunga		26th President; 28 January – 18 February 2001; 21 days	
48	Asoka de Silva	Kumaratunga		27th President; 19 February – 1 August 2001; 163 days	
49	U. De Z. Gunawardana			28th President; 2–14 August 2001; 12 days	
50	T. B. Weerasuriya			29th President; 15 August 2001 – 28 May 2002; 286 days	
51	Chandra Nihal Jayasinghe	Kumaratunga		30th President; 29 May 2002 – 23 January 2003; 239 days	
52	P. H. K. Kulatilleka			—N/a	
53	D. Jayawickrema			—N/a	
54	Shiranee Tilakawardane	Kumaratunga		31st President; 24 January – 24 November 2003; 304 days	
55	N. K. Udalagama			32nd President; 25 November 2003 – 24 March 2004; 120 days	
56	Saleem Marsoof	Kumaratunga		33rd President; 31 March 2004 – 19 January 2005; 294 days	
57	N. E. Dissanayake			—N/a	
58	A. R. N. Fernando			—N/a	
59	Chandradasa Nanayakkara			—N/a	
60	Andrew Somawansa			34th President; 20 January 2005 – 28 May 2006; 1 year, 128 days	
61	G. W. Edirisuriya			—N/a	
62	Nimal Gamini Amaratunga	Kumaratunga		—N/a	
63	D. J. De S. Balapatabendi			35th President; 29 May – 12 December 2006; 197 days	
64	P. Wijayaratne			36th President; 13 December 2006 – 26 February 2007; 75 days	
65	K. Sripavan	Kumaratunga		37th President; 27 February 2007 – 26 March 2008; 1 year, 28 days	
66	Gamini A. L. Abeyratne			—N/a	
67	Chandra Ekanayake			38th President; 27 March – 30 October 2008; 217 days	
68	S. I. Imam			—N/a	
69	L. K. Wimalachandra			—N/a	
70	S. Sriskandarajah	Kumaratunga		40th President; 24 June 2011 – 23 January 2014; 2 years, 213 days	
71	W. C. R. Silva			—N/a	
72	Sisira de Abrew	Kumaratunga		41st President; 26 February – 6 May 2014; 69 days	
73	Eric Basnayake	M. Rajapaksa		—N/a	
74	Sathya Hettige	M. Rajapaksa		39th President; 31 October 2008 – 9 June 2011; 2 years, 221 days	
75	Rohini Marasinghe	M. Rajapaksa		—N/a	
76	Sarath de Abrew	M. Rajapaksa		—N/a	
77	Anil Goonaratne	M. Rajapaksa		—N/a	
78	A. W. A. Salam			42nd President; 9 June – 4 September 2014; 87 days	
79	A. H. M. Upaly Abeyrathne			—N/a	
80	D. S. C. I. Lecamwasam			—N/a	
81	K. T. Chitrasiri	M. Rajapaksa		—N/a	
82	Nalin Perera	M. Rajapaksa		—N/a	
83	Deepali Wijesundara			—N/a	
84	N. S. Rajapaksa			—N/a	
85	P. W. D. C. Jayathilake			—N/a	
86	W. M. M. Malanie Gunaratne			—N/a	
87	Vijith Malalgoda	M. Rajapaksa		43rd President; 9 September 2014 – 9 May 2017; 2 years, 242 days	
88	Dilip Nawaz	M. Rajapaksa		48th President; 3 February – 30 November 2020; 301 days	
89	P. R. Walgama			44th President; 10 May – 17 June 2017; 38 days	
90	M. M. A. Gaffoor			—N/a	
91	H. C. J. Madawala			—N/a	
92	L. T. B. Dehideniya			45th President; 18 June 2017 – 14 January 2018; 210 days	
93	Kumudini Wickremasinghe	Sirisena		—N/a	
94	S. Devika. de L. Tennakoon			—N/a	
95	Padman Surasena	Sirisena	20 January 2016 – 15 January 2018; 1 year, 360 days	46th President; 15 January 2018 – 9 January 2019; 359 days	
96	Arjuna Obeyesekere	Sirisena	23 April 2018 – 1 December 2020; 2 years, 222 days	49th President; 1 December 2020 – 13 June 2021; 194 days	
97	Mahinda Samayawardhena	Sirisena	23 April 2018 – 1 December 2020; 2 years, 222 days	—N/a	
98	Yasantha Kodagoda	Sirisena	—N/a	47th President; 28 March 2019 – 2 February 2020; 311 days	
99	Priyantha Fernando	Sirisena	9 January 2019 – 14 June 2021; 2 years, 156 days	50th President; 14 June 2021 – 5 February 2023; 1 year, 236 days	
100	L. U. Jayasuriya			—N/a	
101	S. Thurairaja	Sirisena		—N/a	
102	Gamini Amarasekera	Sirisena	11 July 2017 – 9 January 2019; 2 years, 121 days	—N/a	
103	Shiran Gooneratne	Sirisena	11 July 2017 – 1 December 2020; 3 years, 143 days	—N/a	
104	Janak de Silva	Sirisena	11 July 2017 – 1 December 2020; 3 years, 143 days	—N/a	
105	Achala Wengappuli	Sirisena	22 February 2018 – 1 December 2020; 2 years, 283 days	—N/a	
106	Bandula Karunarathna	Sirisena	6 March 2019 – 6 February 2023; 3 years, 337 days	51st President; 6 February 2023 – 16 June 2025; 2 years, 130 days	
107	Ruwan Fernando			—N/a	
108	Prasantha De Silva	G. Rajapaksa		—N/a	
109	Pradeep Keerthisinghe	G. Rajapaksa		—N/a	
110	Neil Iddawala	G. Rajapaksa		—N/a	
111	K. K. A. V. Swarnadhipathi	G. Rajapaksa		—N/a	
112	D. N. Samarakoon	G. Rajapaksa		—N/a	
113	Wickum A. Kaluarachchi			—N/a	
114	Sobitha Rajakaruna	G. Rajapaksa		—N/a	
115	Menaka Wijesundara	G. Rajapaksa		—N/a	
116	Sampath B. Abeykoon	G. Rajapaksa		—N/a	
117	Sampath Wijeratne	G. Rajapaksa		—N/a	
118	M. T. Mohammed Laffar	G. Rajapaksa	1 December 2020 – 18 June 2025; 4 years, 199 days	Acting president 2 February – 18 June 2025; 136 days	(Note: Acting president of the Court of Appeal from 2 February to 18 June 2025)
119	Sriyanath Karalliyadde	G. Rajapaksa	1 December 2020 – 12 November 2025; 4 years, 346 days	—N/a	
120	Ratnapriya Gurusinghe	G. Rajapaksa	1 December 2020 – 1 September 2026; 5 years, 274 days	—N/a	
121	Dhammika Ganepola	G. Rajapaksa	1 December 2020 – 15 May 2026; 5 years, 165 days	—N/a	
122	Mayadunne Corea	G. Rajapaksa	1 December 2020; 5 years, 309 days	—N/a	
123	Prabaharan Kumararatnam	G. Rajapaksa	1 December 2020; 5 years, 309 days	—N/a	
124	Sasi Mahendran	G. Rajapaksa	14 June 2021; 5 years, 114 days	—N/a	
125	Ahsan Marikar	Wickremesinghe	6 February 2023 – April 2025; 2 years, 54 days	—N/a	
126	Sanjeeva Morais	Wickremesinghe	7 August 2023; 3 years, 60 days	—N/a	
127	Gihan Kulatunga	Wickremesinghe	6 September 2024 – 10 December 2025; 1 year, 95 days	—N/a	
128	Damitha Thotawatta	Wickremesinghe	6 September 2024; 2 years, 30 days	—N/a	
129	Amal Ranaraja	Wickremesinghe	6 September 2024; 2 years, 30 days	—N/a	
130	Mahen Gopallawa	Wickremesinghe	6 September 2024; 2 years, 30 days	—N/a	
131	Sarath Dissanayake	Dissanayake	9 January 2025; 1 year, 270 days	—N/a	
132	Pradeep Hettiarachchi	Dissanayake	9 January 2025; 1 year, 270 days	—N/a	
133	Sumudu Premachandra	Dissanayake	9 January 2025; 1 year, 270 days	—N/a	
134	K. Priyantha Fernando	Dissanayake	11 March 2025; 1 year, 209 days	—N/a	
135	Annalingam Premashankar	Dissanayake	11 March 2025; 1 year, 209 days	—N/a	
136	Rohantha Abeysooriya	Dissanayake	—N/a	52nd President; 19 June 2025; 1 year, 109 days	
137	Francis Gunawardena	Dissanayake	19 June 2025; 1 year, 109 days	—N/a	
138	Adithya Patabendige	Dissanayake	19 June 2025; 1 year, 109 days	—N/a	
139	Lakmali Karunanayake	Dissanayake	3 September 2026; 33 days	—N/a	
140	Navaratne Marasinghe	Dissanayake	6 October 2026; 0 days	—N/a	
141	Manjula Thilakaratne	Dissanayake	6 October 2026; 0 days	—N/a	

== Notes ==
Sources

- "Court of Appeal of Sri Lanka – Past Presidents". Court of Appeal. 2025.
- "Court of Appeal of Sri Lanka – Past Judges". Court of Appeal. 2025.
