= List of Sri Lankan judges =

The following is an alphabetical list of notable Sri Lankan judges.

== A ==
- A. W. H. Abeyesundere
- Maas Thajoon Akbar
- A. C. Alles
- Nimal Gamini Amaratunga
- Sarath Ambepitiya

== B ==
- Shirani Bandaranayake

== C ==
- Richard Cayley

== D ==
- Oswald Leslie De Kretser II
- Oswald Leslie De Kretser III
- Thomas De Sampayo
- Asoka de Silva

== E ==
- Chandra Ekanayake

== F ==
- Mark Fernando
- T.S. Fernando

== H ==
- Donald Danister Hewagama

== I ==
- Ameer Ismail

== J ==
- Eugene Wilfred Jayewardene
- Alexander Johnston

== K ==
- Dhammika Kitulgoda

== L ==
- Charles Ambrose Lorensz

== M ==
- V. Manicavasagar
- Saleem Marsoof
- Richard Morgan

== O ==
- Anthony Oliphant

== P ==
- Andrew Ranjan Perera

== R ==
- T. W. Rajaratnam
- P. Ramanathan
- Parinda Ranasinghe

== S ==
- Neville Samarakoon
- Siva Selliah
- Suppiah Sharvananda
- Sarath N. Silva
- V. Sivasubramaniam
- J. F. A. Soza
- K. Sripavan
- P. Sriskandarajah

== T ==
- Victor Tennekoon
- H. D. Thambiah
- H. W. Thambiah
- Vincent Thamotheram
- Shirani Tilakawardene

== W ==
- Christopher Weeramantry
- Arthur Wijewardena
