= Nagananda Kodituwakku =

Attorney-at-law (b. 1954)

- නාගානන්ද කොඩිතුවක්කු
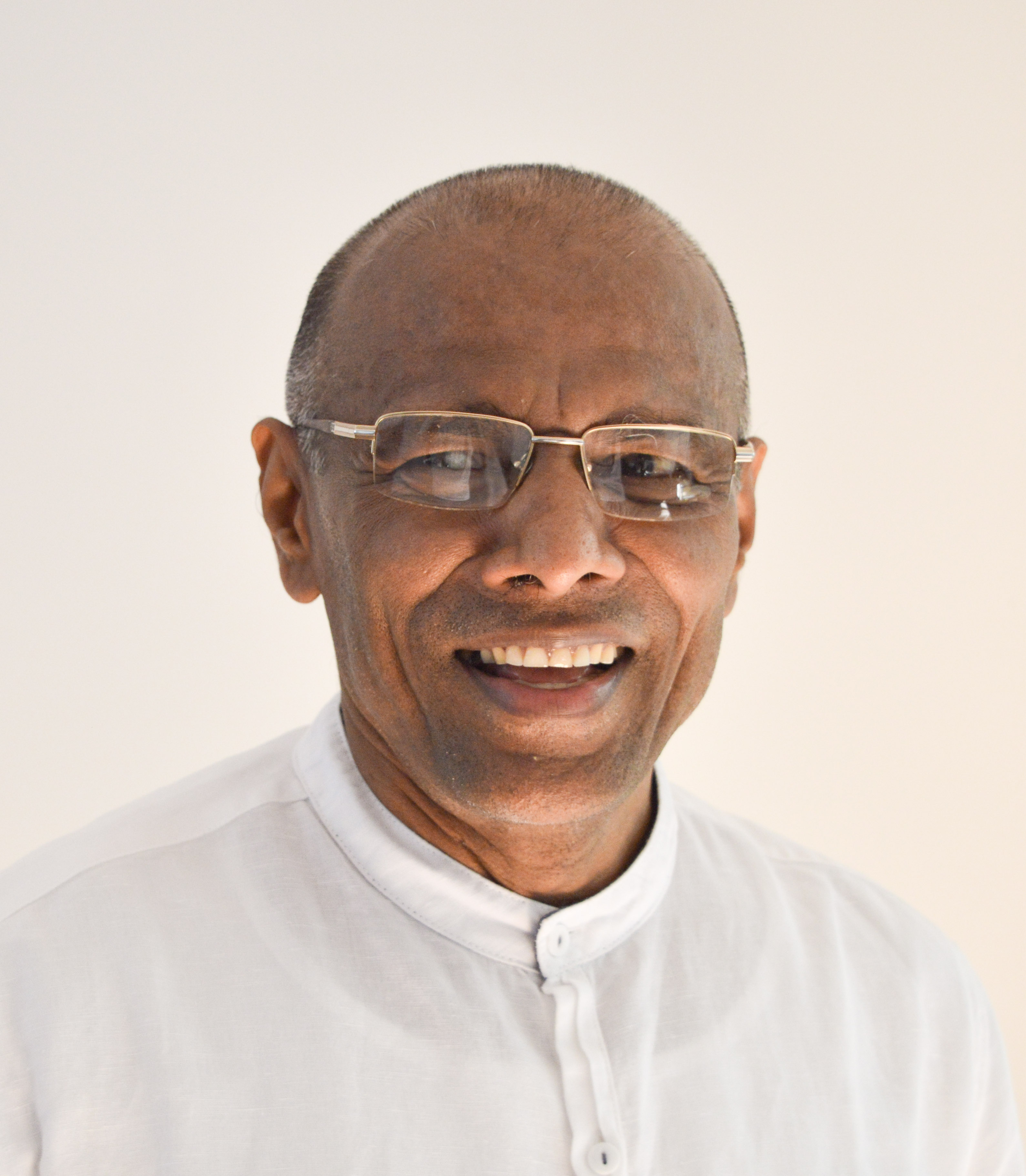

Public Interest Litigation Activist and Attorney-at-law

Personal details
- Born: Nagananda Kodituwakku; 31 July 1954 (age 71) Ratnapura, Dominion of Ceylon (now Sri Lanka)
- Spouse: Shyamalie Kodituwakku
- Education: Ananda College, Colombo
- Alma mater: Sri Lanka Law College Colombo, Queen Mary University of London

Nagananda Kodituwakku (Sinhala: නාගානන්ද කොඩිතුවක්කු; born 31 July 1954) is an attorney-at-law, public interest litigation activist and also a 2019 Presidential Candidate. Having held the office of the Head of Revenue Task Force in the Sri Lanka Customs Administration, Kodituwakku emigrated to the United Kingdom with his family following life-threatening circumstances in 2001. Since his return to Sri Lanka in 2009, he has played a key role in public interest litigation.

Kodituwakku bases himself on the tenets of Buddhist philosophy and he has gained public attention for his stance against corruption and injustice.

== Life and career ==
Kodituwakku was born in Batugedara, Ratnapura as the tenth child of a family of eleven children. His father was a farmer as well as a public officer and his mother was a housewife. Having had his primary education at Seevali Maha Vidyalaya, he went on to complete his higher education at Ananda College, Colombo. Aged 24 Kodituwakku started his career in the Sri Lanka Customs. He went on to complete his attorneys-at-law finals at the Sri Lanka Law College Colombo in 1997. At the age of 47, Kodituwakku and his family migrated to the United Kingdom in 2001, he went on to study at Queen Mary University of London and enrolled as a solicitor in 2005. Kodituwakku practiced as a solicitor in the United Kingdom until his return to Sri Lanka in 2009.

On 20 September 2019, Kodituwakku renounced his British citizenship, as per the constitutional requirement, to allow him to contest in the 2019 Presidential Elections.

== Sri Lanka Customs ==
Kodituwakku began his career in the Sri Lanka Customs Administration on 17 April 1978 as an Assistant Superintendent of Customs. His firm stance against corruption meant that his life in the customs administration was not safe and hence he was issued a personal revolver. He was interdicted twice, for bribery allegations and for assisting a fellow customs officer whilst on interdiction, however, he was exonerated of all charges and appointed as the Head of the Revenue Task Force in Sri Lanka Customs until his departure from the administration and Sri Lanka in 2001 under life-threatening circumstances.

=== Bribery allegations ===
On 13 February 1986, Kodituwakku was remanded with the charge of accepting a bribe, an allegation later found to be false. During his time on remand he received intel of a threat to his life and at his own request, he was transferred to solitary confinement alongside prisoners on death row in Walikada Prison for a period of 14 days. After three years of arrest and interdiction, Kodituwakku fought his case with no legal representation. On 27 November 1992, the allegations were proven to be unfounded. Kodituwakku was finally exonerated and reinstated within the Special Investigations and Intelligence Unit (SIIU) of the Customs Administration on 28 May 1993, seven years after the bribery allegations and arrest.

During his interdiction following the bribery allegations in 1986, Kodituwakku assisted a fellow officer to catch a smuggler in 1991 and he was handed a charge sheet for providing 'unauthorized support'. However, in August 1993, he was exonerated for these charges following an inquiry.

=== Further indictments ===
In November 1993, he filed a case against an importer for falsely declaring motor valuations in the reports submitted to the Sri Lankan customs, a revenue fraud worth several Rs million. The case received political pressure from the then president, Dingiri Banda Wijetunga, and orders from the Director General of Customs to stop the proceeding of the case. Yet Kodituwakku pursued the case and went on to arrest the importer in question. However, in December 1993, he was not allowed to charge the suspect and he was removed from the SIIU to the Policy Planning Division with immediate effect, and the suspect was set free. He was again indicted in December 1993. Later in July 1994 the then Director General of Customs declared by the means of an affidavit to the Supreme Court that he'd been pressured by the then president to dismiss Kodituwakku from office.

During his second interdiction, in February 1995, a team of customs officers led by Anura Weerawansa, the individual found guilty of murdering customs officer Sujith Prasanna Perera, raided Kodituwakku's house under the pretext of searching for prohibited goods. He was produced before court with a criminal charge on the allegation that some stolen government property was found in his possession. This charge was later withdrawn by the Attorney General on the basis that it was a malicious prosecution and Kodituwakku was exonerated by a magistrates order due to no incriminating material found through the conducted search.

Within the same interdiction, in March 1994 a second inquiry was launched into a charge that Kodituwakku had already been exonerated for in 1992 (assisting a fellow customs officer) and on 17 October 1994 he was dismissed from public service. He challenged this dismissal in the Court of Appeal, only for the court to uphold the findings of the second inquiry and dismiss his case. Kodituwakku then challenged this decision in the Supreme Court, where the court reviewed the dismissal and overturned the decision of the Court of Appeal in April 1998. Kodituwakku was reinstated with the position of Head of the Revenue Task Force.

=== Departure from Customs ===
Kodituwakku's departure from the customs administration stems from a case involving four duty-free car permits illegally sold by a hotel to a private company and the then cabinet minister, Reggie Ranatunga's family. The private company admitted to the fraudulent activity and paid the customs fine imposed on them. The Ranatunga family refused to surrender the imported car and pressured the Deputy Director General of Customs to order Kodituwakku to stop the investigation. President Chandrika Kumaratunga also intervened and pressured the Director General to cease the case. Kodituwakku charged all parties involved in the illegal transaction; the director of the hotel, the private company and the daughter-in-law of Reggie Ranatunga. Following the case, Kodituwakku was subjected to multiple death threats for the public humiliation made to the Ranatunga family. Kodituwakku left the country on 21 September 2001.

== Public litigation activism ==
As a public interest litigator, Kodituwakku has over a dozen cases in the Supreme Court and Court of Appeal. In March 2019, The Supreme Court issued Kodituwakku a 3 years suspension from practicing law following a contempt of court charge, however Kodituwakku has gone on to represent these cases as his rights a citizen.

=== Mahinda Rajapaksa 3rd Term Nomination Challenge ===
The 18th amendment to the Sri Lankan constitution removed the two-term restriction for the presidency in Sri Lanka, however there was no clause for this to be applied retrospectively. Therefore, in the light of the then president, Mahinda Rajapaksa, contesting presidency for the third time, Kodituwakku filed this Writ Application at the Registry of the Court of Appeal in December 2014. This submission was reported to be missing until there was a significant challenge by the opposition candidate Maithripala Sirisena. The significant challenge coincided with the missing case to be listed for support on 2 January 2015 during the Sri Lanka court vacation - a vacation system that has also been challenged by Kodituwakku. With the imminent defeat of Rajapakse and requests made by concerned citizens, Kodituwakku withdrew the case as the proceeding would have blocked the Presidential Elections and given Rajapakse a further period of time due to the nature of the 2015 Sri Lankan Presidential Election.

The 19th amendment to the Sri Lankan constitution has reinstated the two-term limit for any president holding office.

=== Tax-free Car Permit Abuse ===
On 11 December 2014, Kodituwakku made his first formal complaint to the Commission to Investigate Allegations of Bribery or Corruption (CIABOC) regarding the sale of tax-free permits by MPs in the open market and requested an investigation into the matter, however the request was refused. These are permits given to MPs and other public sector workers for their office use and upon sale of the vehicle they are subjected to pay all taxes and levies, however it was found that the permits alone were being sold with some permits fetching upwards of Rs. 25 million. In the 2016 budget, Ravi Karunanayake, the then finance minister admitted that the permit scheme was 'politicised' and 'misused' and claimed that the government had lost Rs. 147 billion in unpaid levies as a direct result of it.

In March 2017, the Attorney General informed the Supreme Court the CIABOC has launched an investigation into the abuse of the tax-free permit scheme. Using the Right to Information Act, Kodituwakku published the 100 MPs who'd sold their vehicle permits to private entities or individuals.

=== 2019 Easter Bombings ===
The 2019 Sri Lanka Easter bombings resulted in the deaths of 269 people following a series of coordinated terrorist suicide bombings. It was later revealed that intelligence had been passed over to the Sri Lankan government and that government leaders failed to act upon it. On 28 April 2019, Kodituwakku stated that the negligence is in violation of the Penal Code and the Criminal Procedure Code and has filed a Fundamental Rights petition directing the Attorney General to institute criminal action against the country's senior political, civil and security officials, including Maithripala Sirisena, Mahinda Rajapakse and Ranil Wickremasinghe, for their alleged negligence over the Easter Sunday bombings.

=== Other notable cases ===
==== Prestige Automobiles - BMW ====
Kodituwakku filed a petition in the Court of Appeal of Sri Lanka seeking an order to compel the Director General of Customs to conduct a formal inquiry into Prestige Automobiles for a Rs 16 billion government tax revenue fraud through the importation of 1,675 units of high-value BMW motor cars during the period between March 2011 to October 2014. The Director General at the time, Chulananda Perera, settled the case quickly and issued a Rs 100,000 fine for each car, a total fine of Rs 167,500,000 - roughly 1% of the total amount defrauded. However, Chulananda's successor, Sarojini Charles has rescinded Chulananda's order and launched a fresh inquiry. The outcome of the case is still pending in court.

==== Wilpattu Deforestation ====
In 2015, the Centre for Environmental Justice requested the Court to issue an order to remove illegal structures built on the protected Wilpattu Forest Reserve. However, these illegal structures were depicted as a resettlement area for people who were displaced by war and it was argued that the Wilpattu Forest Reserve was located in the Puttalam district, but the resettlement was carried out in a forest area in the Mannar district. It was also claimed that the resettlement area was once inhabited and since its inhabitants left the area a number of years ago the forest had consumed the area.

A petition was filed by Kodituwakku and environmentalist, Malinda Seneviratne on 22 March 2019 against the unauthorised construction and the deforestation to Wilpattu National Park. Kodituwakku informed the court that Minister Rishad Bathiudeen had been continuously clearing the forest reserve and pleaded for an urgent hearing. The Court of Appeal upheld the request and allowed the petition to be taken up on 28 June 2019.

==== Adulterated Palm Oil ====
Following a customs order to release a detained shipment of 24 containers of palm oil (400 tonnes) in July 2018, Kodituwakku submitted his own Writ Application to the Court of Appeal after his client decides to withdraw from the case. He stated there was irrefutable evidence that the free fatty acids levels of the contents would be injurious to public health. Kodituwakku has also filed a serious contempt charge against the importer Sena Mills (Pvt) Ltd for deceiving the Court with falsified information.

== Disbarred from practicing law ==
On 18 March 2019, the Supreme Court issued a restraining order against Kodituwakku, which suspended the lawyer for a term of 3 years in Sri Lanka. This ruling was the result of a defamation case filed in 2015, he was charged with contempt of court following his behavior towards Vijith Malalgoda, a former President of the Court of Appeal and a judge of the Supreme Court.

There were a series of altercations between Kodituwakku and Malalgoda prior to this ruling.

In October 2014, Kodituwakku submitted letters to the bar association and the Commonwealth Secretariat criticizing the appointment of Malalgoda to the role of President of the Court of Appeal by the then Sri Lankan president Mahinda Rajapaksa. Malalgoda was previously an attorney at the Attorney General's Office, holding the public office role of Deputy Solicitor General. Therefore, Kodituwakku argued its ethically wrong for a public officer who worked to defend the state in the courts to then be appointed a senior role within the judiciary without going through the Sri Lankan court system. Typically judges would work upwards from the Magistrates Court through to the District Court then to the High Court followed by the Court of Appeal and finally the Supreme Court. Traditionally the most senior judge of the Court will hold the office of the President of the Court.

On 20 May 2015, Kodituwakku submitted a written application to request a bench without Malalgoda for one of his cases, to which Malalgoda himself refused and stated that as the President of the Court of Appeal he will hear his case. Kodituwakku was not content and stated that he'd lost trust and confidence in Malalgoda and therefore requests a different bench to hear the case. Malalgoda reported this to the then Chief Justice K Sripavan labeling Kodituwakku's remark on the case record as unruly. Kodituwakku also informed the Chief Justice and referred to the situation as an abuse of office by Malalgoda whilst again requesting the case to be heard by a new bench by the means of an affidavit dated 25 May 2015 - a request that was upheld by the Chief Justice. In February 2016, Kodituwakku went on to charge Malalgoda for judicial corruption before the Commission to Investigate Allegations of Bribery or Corruption for alleged favors to the former President Mahinda Rajapakse. This was following the handling of the Writ Application CA/Writ/434/2014 made by Kodituwakku which challenged the nomination of Mahinda Rajapaksa for a third term.

Kodituwakku was formally issued a charge sheet on 11 August 2017 by the Registrar of the Supreme Court following the complaint made by Malalgoda. The charge sheet specifically referred to the aforementioned comments made by Kodituwakku in May 2015, where he requested the appointment of a new bench sans Malalgoda. During the proceedings, Kodituwakku expressed his willingness to tender his apology to Malalgoda towards his comments made on 21 May 2015, at the Court of Appeal in order to settle the case. The judges used this apology as evidence and found Kodituwakku to have breached rules 60 and 61 of the Supreme Court Rules following his allegations which have been seen to erode public trust and confidence reposed in the judicial system and the apology tendered by Kodituwakku amounts to an unqualified admission of the misconduct. In March 2019, the three-judge bench ruled against Kodituwakku for his manner which is contemptuous of the Court of Appeal and disbarred his for a term of 3 years until March 2022. Since the Supreme Court ruling Kodituwakku has filed a petition against the ruling and continued representing cases of public interest by utilizing general legal provisions, which allows citizens to represent themselves in court.

In April 2024 Kodituwakku wrote a long letter to Margaret Satterthwaite who is the OHCHR's Special Rapporteur on the Independence of Judges and Lawyers. He has asked Satterthwaite to intervene in the case which has resulted in him being barred from practicing law.

== Presidential election candidacy 2019 ==
He planned to contest the 2019 presidential election to adopt a new constitution. However, he didn't manage to secure a political party to submit nominations for the Presidential Election. As a result, he couldn't contest.

Kodituwakku had signed an agreement with the Okkoma Wesiyo Okkoma Rajawaru Sanvidanaya to allow him to contest the election on the condition that he renounce his British citizenship. Other conditions included the transfer of all funds collected by Kodituwakku to the account of Okkoma Wesiyo Okkoma Rajawaru Sanvidanaya, to handle all future sponsorships, in case Kodituwakku failed to obtain proper proof of renunciation of UK citizenship, he should unconditionally support candidate fielded by the party, funds raised by Kodituwakku to be made available to for the other candidate and finally whoever contested he wouldn't have the leadership of the party.

Even though Kodituwakku met all of these conditions, the party secretary Dr. Kapila Theminimulle rescinded his offer in the closing hours of nominations and advised Kodituwakku to support the National People's Movement candidate, General Mahesh Senanayake. Kodituwakku also strived to get another political party, but claimed that the dormant political parties were asking for fiscal returns ranging from Rs. 10 million to 30 million to front his nomination. This practice of selling political parties is common during election periods but it is completely illegal and if caught the candidate or culprits can be disqualified and even face jail term.

Having campaigned for 2 years, Kodituwakku collected and spent a sum of Rs. 13 million for the election campaign from his well wishers. Since the election Kodituwakku has handed the Election Commission a full audited report for the election fund. He has also initiated legal action against Dr. Kapila Theminimulle for the criminal breach of trust.

== Parliamentary Elections 2020 ==
Kodituwakku and organisation Sri Lanka Vinivida Peramuna submitted their party registration to the Election Commission in February 2020, however, the commission was unable to register any party in time for the Parliamentary Elections in 2020. Therefore, Kodituwakku contested as an Independent Party from the Colombo district under the Shield symbol. The Independent Party were not successful in attaining a seat from Colombo, Kodituwakku has stated that the election cannot be deemed free and fair due to the unparalleled media coverage offered to other prominent parties in the media.
