= Annalingam Premashankar =

Sri Lankan judge of the Court of Appeal since 2025

The Honourable Annalingam Premashankar

Judge of the Court of Appeal of Sri Lanka
- Incumbent
- Assumed office 11 March 2025
- Appointed by: Anura Kumara Dissanayake

Personal details
- Born: Annalingam Premashankar Thunnalai, Vadamarachchi
- Education: Sri Lanka Law College; Royal College, Colombo; Hindu College, Colombo; Hartley College

Annalingam Premashankar is a Sri Lankan lawyer who serves as a judge of the Court of Appeal of Sri Lanka. He was appointed by President Anura Kumara Dissanayake and has served since 11 March 2025.

== Early life ==
Premashankar was born in Thunnalai, Vadamarachchi. He is an alumnus of Royal College, Colombo and also attended Hindu College, Colombo, Hartley College, and Thunnalai Roman Catholic School. He graduated from Sri Lanka Law College.

== Career ==
Premashankar previously served as a judge in Sri Lanka's Magistrate's Court, District Court, and High Court before his appointment to the Court of Appeal.
