= M. T. Mohammed Laffar =

Sri Lankan judge of the Court of Appeal (2020–2020

The Honourable M. T. Mohammed Laffar

Acting President of the Court of Appeal of Sri Lanka
- In office 2 February 2025 – 18 June 2025
- Appointed by: Anura Kumara Dissanayake

Judge of the Court of Appeal of Sri Lanka
- In office 1 December 2020 – 18 June 2025
- Appointed by: Gotabaya Rajapaksa

Personal details
- Born: Mohammed Thahir Mohammed Laffar; 18 June 1962 (age 63)

Mohammed Thahir Mohammed Laffar (born 18 June 1962) is a Sri Lankan lawyer and former judge who served as acting president of the Court of Appeal of Sri Lanka from 2 February to 18 June 2025. He was appointed a judge of the Court of Appeal by President Gotabaya Rajapaksa on 1 December 2020.

On 2 February 2025, President Anura Kumara Dissanayake appointed Laffar as the acting president of the Court of Appeal, with his term extended on 17 February 2025.

Laffar retired on 18 June 2025 upon reaching the age of 63, which is the mandatory retirement age for a judge of the Court of Appeal.

== Career ==
Laffar previously served as a judge in Sri Lanka's High Court before his appointment to the Court of Appeal.
