= Sasi Mahendran =

Sri Lankan judge of the Court of Appeal since 2021

The Honourable Sasi Mahendran

Judge of the Court of Appeal of Sri Lanka
- Incumbent
- Assumed office 14 June 2021
- Appointed by: Gotabaya Rajapaksa

Judge of the High Court of Sri Lanka
- In office 10 April 2012 – 14 June 2021
- Appointed by: Mahinda Rajapaksa

Personal details
- Born: Balendran Sasi Mahendran
- Education: Institute of Advanced Legal Studies; University of Colombo (LL.M); Sri Lanka Law College; S. Thomas' College, Gurutalawa; R. K. M. Sri Koneswara Hindu College

Balendran Sasi Mahendran is a Sri Lankan lawyer who serves as a judge of the Court of Appeal of Sri Lanka. He was appointed by President Gotabaya Rajapaksa and has served since 14 June 2021.

== Early life ==
Mahendran is an alumnus of R. K. M. Sri Koneswara Hindu College and S. Thomas' College, Gurutalawa. He graduated from Sri Lanka Law College, the University of Colombo and the Institute of Advanced Legal Studies.

== Career ==
Mahendran joined the Attorney General's Department on 3 February 1997 as an acting State Attorney and was promoted to Senior State Counsel in 2007. He was appointed as a judge of the High Court of Sri Lanka on 10 April 2012 by President Mahinda Rajapaksa and served in that position until his appointment to the Court of Appeal.
