= President of the Court of Appeal =

President of the Court of Appeal may refer to:

- President of the Court of Appeal (Ireland)
- President of the New South Wales Court of Appeal
- President of the Queensland Court of Appeal
- President of the Court of Appeal of Sri Lanka
