= Sumudu Premachandra =

Sri Lankan judge of the Court of Appeal since 2025

The Honourable Sumudu Premachandra

Judge of the Court of Appeal of Sri Lanka
- Incumbent
- Assumed office 11 March 2025
- Appointed by: Anura Kumara Dissanayake

Personal details
- Born: Wickrama Karaluarachchige Sumudu Upashantha Premachandra
- Education: Primary Education Royal College, Colombo 07: Sabaragamuwa University (PhD); University of Aberdeen (LL.M); Open University (LL.B); Sri Lanka Law College; Royal College, Colombo

Sumudu Premachandra is a Sri Lankan lawyer who serves as a judge of the Court of Appeal of Sri Lanka. He was appointed by President Anura Kumara Dissanayake and has served since 11 March 2025.

== Early life ==
Premachandra is an alumnus of Royal College, Colombo. He graduated from Sri Lanka Law College, the Open University of Sri Lanka, the University of Aberdeen and the Sabaragamuwa University of Sri Lanka.

== Career ==
Premachandra previously served as a judge in Sri Lanka's High Court before being appointed to the Court of Appeal.
