= Thotawatta =

Thotawatta or Thotawatte (Sinhala: තොටවත්ත, romanized: Toṭavatta) is a Sinhalese surname. Notable people with the surname include:

== Thotawatta ==
- Damitha Thotawatta, Sri Lankan judge of the Court of Appeal

== Thotawatte ==
- Titus Thotawatte (1927–2011), Sri Lankan movie director and editor
