= Asoka de Silva (judge) =

Chief Justice of Sri Lanka from 2009 to 2011

Asoka De Silva

42nd Chief Justice of Sri Lanka
- In office 8 June 2009 – 17 May 2011
- Appointed by: Mahinda Rajapaksa
- Preceded by: Sarath N. Silva
- Succeeded by: Shirani Bandaranayake

Judge of the International Criminal Tribunal for Rwanda
- In office 3 August 2004 – 17 May 2011
- Preceded by: Asoka de Zoysa Gunawardana

Justice of the Supreme Court of Sri Lanka
- In office 1 August 2001 – 17 May 2011
- Appointed by: Chandrika Kumaratunga

President of the Court of Appeal of Sri Lanka
- In office 19 February 2001 – 1 August 2001
- Appointed by: Chandrika Kumaratunga
- Preceded by: C. V. Vigneswaran
- Succeeded by: Upali de Zoysa Gunawardana

Judge of the Court of Appeal of Sri Lanka
- In office 12 October 1995 – 19 February 2001
- Appointed by: Chandrika Kumaratunga

Senior Deputy Solicitor General
- In office 1974–1995

Personal details
- Born: 17 May 1946 (age 80)
- Education: University of Peradeniya; University of Colombo; University of Illinois at Urbana–Champaign

Joseph Asoka Nihal De Silva (born 17 May 1946) was the 42nd Chief Justice of Sri Lanka.

Silva obtained his primary education from St. Anthony's College, Kandy. After graduating from University of Peradeniya in 1971 he joined as an advocate of the Supreme Court in December 1972. He joined the Attorney General's Department on 2 April 1974. He became a Senior Deputy Solicitor General on 1987 and after serving 22 years in the Attorney General's Department he was appointed a judge of the Court of Appeal on 12 October 1995. Chief Justice Asoka De Silva became the President of the Court of Appeal in February 2001 and later elevated to the Supreme Court on 1 August 2001.

On 31 July 2013 he was appointed a member of the Judges and Magistrates Vetting Board in Kenya, a body established under Kenya's new Constitution to rid the Judiciary of unsuitable judicial officers.

Asoka De Silva has obtained a master's degree in administrative law in 1983/84 from the University of Colombo and has done a postgraduate diploma in criminology at the University of Illinois in the United States.

== Services ==
- Lecturer in Sri Lanka Law College
- Lecturer in Faculty of Law, University of Colombo
- Represented Sri Lanka at the United Nations Conference on Sustainable Development in Brazil
- Member of the National Task Force to formulate the National Environmental Policy
- International Criminal Tribunal for Rwanda as a permanent judge by the United Nations Secretary General, Kofi Annan on 3 August 2004. He served ICTR as one of the 16 permanent judges in the tribunal in Trial Chamber II.

== See also ==
- List of St. Anthony's College, Kandy alumni
- Chief Justice of Sri Lanka
- International Criminal Tribunal for Rwanda

Legal offices
Preceded by Sarath N. Silva	Chief Justice of Sri Lanka; 2009–2011	Succeeded by Shirani Bandaranayake
