= Marikkar =

Marikkar (Sinhala: මරික්කාර්, Tamil: மரிக்கார், romanized: Marikkār) or Marikar (Sinhala: මරිකාර්, Tamil: மரிக்கர், romanized: Marikār) is a given name and a surname. Notable people with the given or surname include:

== Marikkar ==
- C. A. S. Marikkar (1911–1970), Sri Lankan politician
- S. M. Marikkar (born 1977), Sri Lankan politician
- Neela Marikkar, Sri Lankan businesswoman

== Marikar ==
=== Surname ===
- Anarkali Marikar, Indian actress
- Ahsan Marikar, Sri Lankan judge of the Court of Appeal
- M. H. M. Naina Marikar, Sri Lankan lawyer and politician

=== Given name ===
- A. L. M. Athaullah (born 1957), Sri Lankan politician
- Wapchie Marikar Abdul Rahman (1868–1933), Ceylonese landed proprietor and politician

== Other uses ==
- SS Habib Marikar, Cargo ship

== See also ==
- Marakkar
- Kunjali Marakkar
