= Navaratne Marasinghe =

Sri Lankan judge of the Court of Appeal since 2026

The Honourable Navaratne Marasinghe

Judge of the Court of Appeal of Sri Lanka
- Incumbent
- Assumed office 6 October 2026
- Appointed by: Anura Kumara Dissanayake

Personal details
- Born: Navaratne Marasinghe

Navaratne Marasinghe is a Sri Lankan lawyer who serves as a judge of the Court of Appeal of Sri Lanka since 6 October 2026.

Marasinghe previously served as a judge of the High Court. On 22 September 2026, President Anura Kumara Dissanayake recommended Marasinghe's appointment as a judge of the Court of Appeal to the Constitutional Council, which approved it on 3 October 2026. He was elevated to the Court of Appeal on 6 October 2026.
