= Ahsan Marikar =

Sri Lankan judge of the Court of Appeal (2023–2025)

The Honourable Ahsan Marikar

Judge of the Court of Appeal of Sri Lanka
- In office 6 February 2023 – April 2025
- Appointed by: Ranil Wickremesinghe

Judge of the High Court of Sri Lanka
- In office 12 April 2012 – 6 February 2023
- Appointed by: Mahinda Rajapaksa

Personal details
- Born: Muhammad Ahsan Razik Marikar

Muhammad Ahsan Razik Marikar is a Sri Lankan lawyer who served as a judge of the Court of Appeal of Sri Lanka. He was appointed by President Ranil Wickremesinghe and served from 6 February 2023 till April 2025.

== Career ==
Marikar previously served as a judge in the High Court of Sri Lanka before being appointed to the Court of Appeal.
