= Dhammika Ganepola =

Sri Lankan judge of the Court of Appeal (2020–2026)

The Honourable Dhammika Ganepola

Judge of the Court of Appeal of Sri Lanka
- In office 1 December 2020 – May 2026
- Appointed by: Gotabaya Rajapaksa

Personal details
- Born: Dhammika Ganepola

Dhammika Ganepola is a Sri Lankan lawyer who served as a judge of the Court of Appeal of Sri Lanka from 1 December 2020 till May 2026.

== Career ==
Ganepola previously served as a judge in Sri Lanka's High Court.

On 1 December 2020, President Gotabaya Rajapaksa appointed him as judge of the Court of Appeal. Ganepola retired from service in May 2026.
