= Gurusinghe =

Gurusinghe or Gurusinha (Sinhala: ගුරුසිංහ, romanized: Gurusiṁha) is a Sinhalese surname. Notable people with the surname include:

- Asanka Gurusinha (born 1966), Sri Lankan former cricket player
- Ratnapriya Gurusinghe, Sri Lankan judge of the Court of Appeal
