= Thilakaratne =

Thilakaratne is both a given name and a surname. Notable people with the name include:

== Given name ==
- Thilakaratne Withanachchi, Sri Lankan politician

== Surname ==
- Manjula Thilakaratne, Sri Lankan judge of the Court of Appeal
- Sugath Thilakaratne (born 1973), Sri Lankan athlete
