= Adithya Patabendige =

Sri Lankan judge of the Court of Appeal since 2025

The Honourable Adithya Patabendige

Judge of the Court of Appeal of Sri Lanka
- Incumbent
- Assumed office 19 June 2025
- Appointed by: Anura Kumara Dissanayake

Personal details
- Born: Adithya Kantha Madduma Patabendige

Adithya Kantha Madduma Patabendige is a Sri Lankan lawyer who serves as a judge of the Court of Appeal of Sri Lanka. He was appointed by President Anura Kumara Dissanayake and has served since 19 June 2025.

== Career ==
Patabendige previously served as a judge of the High Court of Sri Lanka before his appointment to the Court of Appeal.

=== Commission assignments ===
On 17 April 2026, President Dissanayake appointed Patabendige to a three-member Presidential Commission of Inquiry, chaired by Supreme Court justice Gihan Kulatunga, to investigate coal purchases for electricity generation from the inception of coal-based power in Sri Lanka until 16 April 2026.
