= Sanjeeva Morais =

Sri Lankan judge of the Court of Appeal since 2023

The Honourable Sanjeeva Morais

Judge of the Court of Appeal of Sri Lanka
- Incumbent
- Assumed office 7 August 2023
- Appointed by: Ranil Wickremesinghe

Personal details
- Born: M. C. B. Sanjeeva Morais

M. C. B. Sanjeeva Morais is a Sri Lankan lawyer who serves as a judge of the Court of Appeal of Sri Lanka. He was appointed by President Ranil Wickremesinghe and has served since 7 August 2023.

== Career ==
Morais previously served as a judge in the High Court of Sri Lanka before being appointed to the Court of Appeal.
