= Ranaraja =

Ranaraja (Sinhala: රණරාජා, romanized: Raṇarājā) is a Sinhalese surname. Notable people with the surname include:

- Amal Ranaraja, Sri Lankan judge of the Court of Appeal
- Chandra Ranaraja (1939–2016), Sri Lankan politician and first female mayor
- Shelton Ranaraja (1926–2011), Sri Lankan lawyer, politician and deputy minister
