= Priyantha Fernando =

Puisne justice of the Supreme Court of Sri Lanka (2023–2026)

The Honourable Priyantha Fernando

Puisne Justice of the Supreme Court of Sri Lanka
- In office 6 February 2023 – May 2026
- Appointed by: Ranil Wickremesinghe

President of the Court of Appeal of Sri Lanka
- In office 14 June 2021 – 6 February 2023
- Appointed by: Gotabaya Rajapaksa

Judge of the Court of Appeal of Sri Lanka
- In office 9 January 2019 – 6 February 2023
- Appointed by: Maithripala Sirisena

Personal details
- Born: K. Priyantha Fernando
- Education: Sri Lanka Law College

K. Priyantha Fernando is a Sri Lankan lawyer who served as a puisne justice of the Supreme Court of Sri Lanka from 6 February 2023 till May 2026.

== Career ==
Fernando was appointed as a judge of the Court of Appeal of Sri Lanka on 9 January 2019 by President Maithripala Sirisena. He was later appointed President of the Court of Appeal on 14 June 2021 by President Gotabaya Rajapaksa.

Fernando was appointed as a puisne justice of the Supreme Court by President Ranil Wickremesinghe on 6 February 2023. He retired from service in May 2026.
