= Sarath Dissanayake (judge) =

Sri Lankan judge of the Court of Appeal since 2025

The Honourable Sarath Dissanayake

Judge of the Court of Appeal of Sri Lanka
- Incumbent
- Assumed office 9 January 2025
- Appointed by: Anura Kumara Dissanayake

Personal details
- Born: K. M. Sarath Dissanayake

K. M. Sarath Dissanayake is a Sri Lankan lawyer who serves as a judge of the Court of Appeal of Sri Lanka. He was appointed by President Anura Kumara Dissanayake and has served since 9 January 2025.

== Career ==
Dissanayake previously served as a judge in Sri Lanka's High Court before being appointed to the Court of Appeal.
