= Francis Gunawardena =

Sri Lankan judge of the Court of Appeal since 2025

The Honourable Francis Gunawardena

Judge of the Court of Appeal of Sri Lanka
- Incumbent
- Assumed office 19 June 2025
- Appointed by: Anura Kumara Dissanayake

Personal details
- Born: Don Francis Hathurusinghe Gunawardena

Don Francis Hathurusinghe Gunawardena is a Sri Lankan lawyer who serves as a judge of the Court of Appeal of Sri Lanka. He was appointed by President Anura Kumara Dissanayake and has served since 19 June 2025.

== Career ==
Gunawardena previously served as a judge of the High Court of Sri Lanka before his appointment to the Court of Appeal.
