= Janak de Silva =

Puisne justice of the Supreme Court of Sri Lanka since 2020

The Honourable Janak de Silva

Puisne Justice of the Supreme Court of Sri Lanka
- Incumbent
- Assumed office 1 December 2020
- Appointed by: Gotabaya Rajapaksa

Judge of the Court of Appeal of Sri Lanka
- In office 11 July 2017 – 1 December 2020
- Appointed by: Maithripala Sirisena

Personal details
- Born: Janak de Silva
- Education: Michigan State University; University College London (LL.M); University of Oxford (BCL); Sri Lanka Law College
- Alma mater: Trinity College, Kandy

Janak de Silva is a Sri Lankan lawyer serving since 1 December 2020 as a puisne justice of the Supreme Court of Sri Lanka. He was appointed by President Gotabaya Rajapaksa.

== Early life ==
De Silva is an alumnus of Trinity College, Kandy, where he studied from 1973 to 1987. He represented the school in hockey, chess, cricket, athletics, quiz, and drama competitions. He captained the First XI hockey team and was awarded hockey colours. He served as a school officer and prefect and was the first recipient of the Valesca Reimann Memorial Scholarship.

He graduated from Sri Lanka Law College with class I honours and the University of Oxford, where he obtained a Bachelor of Civil Law (BCL) degree. He also earned a Master of Laws (LL.M) from University College London, specialising in international business transactions.

== Career ==
De Silva previously served as a judge of the Court of Appeal of Sri Lanka from 11 July 2017 to 1 December 2020, having been appointed by President Maithripala Sirisena. Before his judicial appointment, he was a Senior Deputy Solicitor General with the Attorney General's Department where he served from 1993 to 2017.

On 22 September 2019, then-President Maithripala Sirisena appointed a five-member Presidential Commission of Inquiry into the 2019 Sri Lanka Easter bombings, with de Silva as chairman. The commission's final report was submitted to President Gotabaya Rajapaksa on 1 February 2021.

He also serves as a non-resident judge of the Court of Appeal of Seychelles, having been sworn in for a five-year term on 29 November 2023 by Vice President Ahmed Afif.

== Achievements ==
- Passed the final examination for the admission of attorneys-at-law with class I honours.
- Received the Hector Jayawardena Gold Medal for the Address to the Jury (English) contest.
- Received the Walter Ladduwahetty Gold Medal for Academic Excellence at Sri Lanka Law College.
- Awarded a Shell Centenary Scholarship to pursue postgraduate studies at University College London.
- Awarded a Hubert H. Humphrey Fellowship by the Fulbright Program, which he undertook at Michigan State University.

== Honours ==
- Elected an Honorary Bencher of Gray's Inn on 13 October 2021.
- Appointed a Senior Fellow (Honorary) in Law at the University of Melbourne in August 2023.

== Notes ==
- "Hon. Justice Janak De Silva". Supreme Court of Sri Lanka. 17 September 2025. Archived from the original on 19 April 2026.
