= Rohantha Abeysooriya =

Sri Lankan president of the Court of Appeal since 2025

The Honourable Nalin Abeysooriya PC

52nd President of the Court of Appeal of Sri Lanka
- Incumbent
- Assumed office 19 June 2025
- Appointed by: Anura Kumara Dissanayake
- Preceded by: Bandula Karunarathna

Personal details
- Born: Nalin Rohantha Abeysooriya
- Education: University of Colombo (LLB); Sri Lanka Law College; Royal College, Colombo

Nalin Rohantha Abeysuriya, PC is a Sri Lankan lawyer who is currently serving as the 52nd President of the Court of Appeal of Sri Lanka. He was appointed by President Anura Kumara Dissanayake on 19 June 2025.

== Early life ==
Abeysuriya is an alumnus of Royal College, Colombo, the University of Colombo and Sri Lanka Law College.

== Career ==
Abeysuriya previously served as a Senior Additional Solicitor General and Head of the Criminal Division of the Attorney General's Department before his appointment to the judiciary.

Legal offices
Preceded by Bandula Karunarathna	President of the Court of Appeal; 2025–present	Incumbent
