= Ratnapriya Gurusinghe =

Sri Lankan judge of the Court of Appeal (born 1963)

The Honourable Ratnapriya Gurusinghe

Judge of the Court of Appeal of Sri Lanka
- In office 1 December 2020 – 1 September 2026
- Appointed by: Gotabaya Rajapaksa

Judge of the High Court of Sri Lanka
- In office 2012 – 1 December 2020
- Appointed by: Mahinda Rajapaksa

Personal details
- Born: Ratnapriya Gurusinghe; 1 September 1963 (age 63)

Ratnapriya Gurusinghe (born 1 September 1963) is a Sri Lankan lawyer who served as a judge of the Court of Appeal of Sri Lanka from 1 December 2020 till 1 September 2026.

== Career ==
Gurusinghe joined the judiciary on 5 March 1996 and served as a judge in Sri Lanka's Magistrate's Court, District Court and the High Court. He was elevated as a judge of the Court of Appeal on 1 December 2020 by President Gotabaya Rajapaksa.

In July 2025, the then Chief Justice, Murdu Fernando, recommended Gurusinghe for appointment as a puisne justice of the Supreme Court of Sri Lanka. The recommendation was forwarded to President Anura Kumara Dissanayake, who was expected to submit it to the Constitutional Council for approval. However, this did not come to pass, and Gurusinghe retired on 1 September 2026 upon reaching 63, the mandatory retirement age for a judge of the Court of Appeal.
