= Mahen Gopallawa =

Sri Lankan judge of the Court of Appeal since 2024

The Honourable Mahen Gopallawa

Judge of the Court of Appeal of Sri Lanka
- Incumbent
- Assumed office 6 September 2024
- Appointed by: Ranil Wickremesinghe

Personal details
- Born: M. C. L. B. Gopallawa
- Education: National University of Singapore (LL.M); University of Colombo (LL.B and LL.M); Sri Lanka Law College; S. Thomas' College, Mount Lavinia

Mahen Gopallawa is a Sri Lankan lawyer who serves as a judge of the Court of Appeal of Sri Lanka. He was appointed by President Ranil Wickremesinghe and has served since 6 September 2024.

== Early life ==
Gopallawa is an alumnus of S. Thomas' College, Mount Lavinia. He graduated from Sri Lanka Law College, the University of Colombo and the National University of Singapore.

== Career ==
Before his judicial appointment, Gopallawa served as a Senior Deputy Solicitor General at the Attorney General's Department. He was nominated for his current position by Attorney General Parinda Ranasinghe.
