= Asoka De Zoysa Gunawardana =

Sri Lankan judge

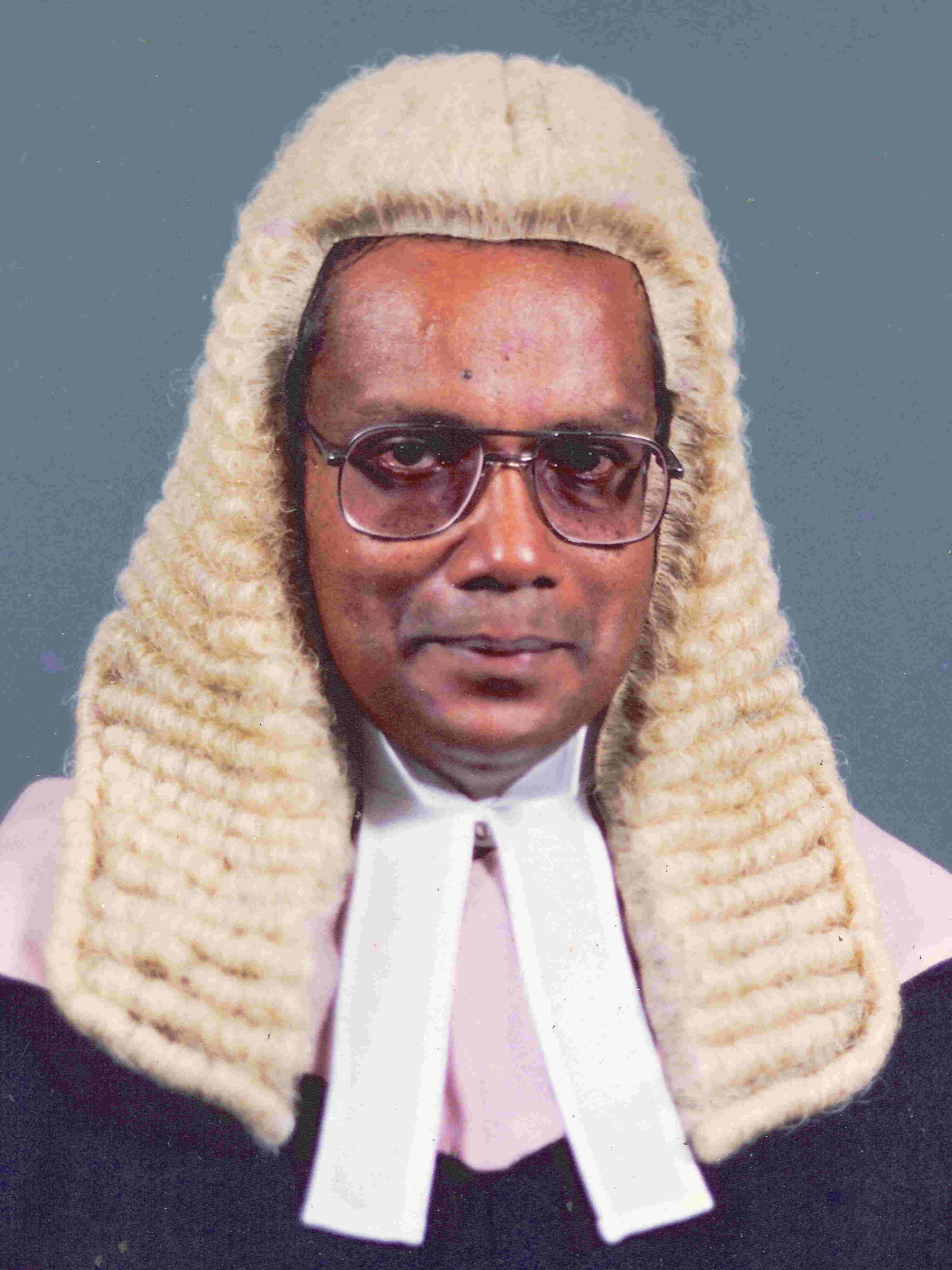

Judge, Appeals Chamber of the International Criminal Tribunal for Rwanda and International Criminal Tribunal for the former Yugoslavia
- In office 2001–2004
- Appointed by: Kofi Annan
- Succeeded by: Asoka de Silva

Judge of the International Criminal Tribunal for Rwanda
- In office 31 May 1999 – 30 June 2004
- Appointed by: Kofi Annan
- Preceded by: Dionysios Kondylis

Puisne justice of the Supreme Court of Sri Lanka
- In office 1996–1999
- Appointed by: Chandrika Kumaratunga

Judge of the Court of Appeal of Sri Lanka
- In office 1988–1996
- Appointed by: J. R. Jayewardene

Deputy Solicitor General, Attorney General's Department (Sri Lanka)
- In office 1986–1988

Personal details
- Born: 6 August 1942 Balapitiya, Sri Lanka
- Died: 26 November 2004 (aged 62) Colombo, Sri Lanka
- Education: University of Sydney; University of Ceylon, Colombo; S. Thomas' College, Mount Lavinia; Revatha College, Balapitiya
- Occupation: Judge
- Profession: Advocate

Asoka De Zoysa Gunawardana (6 August 1942 – 26 November 2004) was a Sri Lankan judge of the International Criminal Tribunal for Rwanda (ICTR) from 1999 to 2004. He was also a judge of the Appeals Chamber of the International Criminal Tribunal for the former Yugoslavia (ICTY) and the International Criminal Tribunal for Rwanda (ICTR) from 2001 to 2004.

Previously Justice Gunawardana was a judge of the Court of Appeal of Sri Lanka from 1988 to 1996 and a puisne justice of the Supreme Court of Sri Lanka from 1996 to 1999.

== Historical context ==
While the Nuremberg and Tokyo Tribunals were established by the occupying and victorious powers, the ICTY and the ICTR are the first truly international criminal courts. These two courts laid the foundation and legal precedents for the establishment of the permanent International Criminal Court (ICC).

== Early life and education ==
Justice Gunawardana was born on 6 August 1942 in Sri Lanka. He attended the local primary school at Revatha College, Balapitiya, till grade 9. He then received a scholarship to attend S. Thomas' College, Mount Lavinia to study for his A-Level exam.

Justice Gunawardana graduated in law from the University of Ceylon, Colombo, in 1969 and obtained his PhD in international law from the University of Sydney, Australia in 1986. He also holds a Diploma in Human Rights form Raoul Wallenberge Institute, University of Lund, Sweden (1993). Active in the field of international law and international human rights law, he has participated in numerous international conferences and seminars, served as a panelist at the Meetings of the American Society of International Law and SAARCLAW conferences, and lectured in international law at Aristotle University in Thessaloniki, Greece.

== Career ==
He was enrolled as an advocate of the Supreme Court of Sri Lanka in June 1967, and became Barrister-at-Law of the High Court of Australia and the Supreme Court of New South Wales in November 1984. He worked in Sri Lanka's Attorney-General's department as a Crown Counsel from 1972, and was appointed Deputy Solicitor-General in 1986. In 1988 he was appointed a Judge of the Court of Appeal of Sri Lanka, and became President of the Court of Appeal in 1996. In December 1996, he was elevated to the Supreme Court, the highest Court in Sri Lanka.
