= Barnes Ratwatte II =

Sri Lankan judge

Barnes Shelton Carlye Ratwatte II (1918 or 1919–2004) was a Sri Lankan lawyer and judge. He was a former Puisne Justice of the Supreme Court of Ceylon and Public Trustee.

Ratwatte was born to a prominent Radala family, who were descended from Ratwatte Dissawa, Dissawa of Matale, a signatory on behalf of the Sinhalese to the Kandyan Convention of 1815. Born to Barnes Ratwatte Dissawa and Rosalind Mahawelatenne Kumarihamy of Mahawelatenne Walauwa, Balangoda, his eldest sister was Sirimavo Bandaranaike the first female prime minister in the world.

Educated at Trinity College, Kandy, and the Ceylon Law College. He became an Advocate and was appointed as a Magistrate in 1960. In 1974, he was appointed President of the Appeal Court. Later appointed to the Supreme Court of Sri Lanka he retired in 1983.

== See also ==
- List of political families in Sri Lanka

== External links & References ==
- The Ratwatte Ancestry
