= Punyadasa Edussuriya =

Sri Lankan judge

The Honourable Justice Punyadasa Edussuriya

Puisne Justice of the Supreme Court of Sri Lanka

Justice Punyadasa Edussuriya is a Sri Lankan judge. He was a Judge of the Supreme Court of Sri Lanka and prior to which he served as a Judge of the Court of Appeal. After his retirement he served as a member of the Commission to Investigate Allegations of Bribery or Corruption.

Edussuriya was educated at Royal College Colombo, where his classmates included Justice S. W. B. Wadugodapitiya and Upali Wijewardene.
