= Pradeep Hettiarachchi =

Sri Lankan judge of the Court of Appeal since 2025

The Honourable Rohitha Pradeep Hettiarachchi

Judge of the Court of Appeal of Sri Lanka
- Incumbent
- Assumed office 9 January 2025
- Appointed by: Anura Kumara Dissanayake

Personal details
- Born: Rohitha Pradeep Hettiarachchi

Rohitha Pradeep Hettiarachchi is a Sri Lankan lawyer who serves as a judge of the Court of Appeal of Sri Lanka. He was appointed by President Anura Kumara Dissanayake and has served since 9 January 2025.

== Career ==
Hettiarachchi previously served as a judge in Sri Lanka's High Court before being appointed to the Court of Appeal.
