= Mayadunne Corea =

Sri Lankan judge of the Court of Appeal since 2020

The Honourable Mayadunne Corea

Judge of the Court of Appeal of Sri Lanka
- Incumbent
- Assumed office 1 December 2020
- Appointed by: Gotabaya Rajapaksa

Personal details
- Born: Mayadunne Corea

Mayadunne Corea is a Sri Lankan lawyer who serves as a judge of the Court of Appeal of Sri Lanka. He was appointed by President Gotabaya Rajapaksa and has served since 1 December 2020.

== Career ==
Corea previously served as a judge in Sri Lanka's High Court before his appointment to the Court of Appeal.

He has also served as a judge in Fiji's High Court.
