= Damitha Thotawatta =

Sri Lankan judge of the Court of Appeal since 2024

The Honourable Damitha Thotawatta

Judge of the Court of Appeal of Sri Lanka
- Incumbent
- Assumed office 6 September 2024
- Appointed by: Ranil Wickremesinghe

Personal details
- Born: Damitha Thotawatta

Damitha Thotawatta is a Sri Lankan lawyer who serves as a judge of the Court of Appeal of Sri Lanka. He was appointed by President Ranil Wickremesinghe and has served since 6 September 2024.

== Career ==
Thotawatta previously served as a judge in the High Court of Sri Lanka before being appointed to the Court of Appeal. He was nominated for his current position by then-Chief Justice Jayantha Jayasuriya.
