= Manjula Thilakaratne =

Sri Lankan judge of the Court of Appeal since 2026

The Honourable Manjula Thilakaratne

Judge of the Court of Appeal of Sri Lanka
- Incumbent
- Assumed office 6 October 2026
- Appointed by: Anura Kumara Dissanayake

Personal details
- Born: H. M. R. Manjula Thilakaratne

H. M. R. Manjula Thilakaratne is a Sri Lankan lawyer who serves as a judge of the Court of Appeal of Sri Lanka since 6 October 2026.

Thilakaratne previously served as a judge of the High Court. On 22 September 2026, President Anura Kumara Dissanayake recommended Thilakaratne's appointment as a judge of the Court of Appeal to the Constitutional Council, which approved it on 3 October 2026. He was elevated to the Court of Appeal on 6 October 2026.
