= Chandra Nihal Jayasinghe =

Sri Lankan judge

Chandra Nihal Jayasinghe is a Sri Lankan judge and a member of the Khmer Rouge Tribunal. He is the Sri Lanka High Commissioner to the United Kingdom and was formerly a senior presiding judge of the Supreme Court of Sri Lanka and president of the Court of Appeal of Sri Lanka.
