= Shiranee Tilakawardane =

Sri Lankan judge

Puisne Justice of the Supreme Court of Sri Lanka
- In office 19 February 2003 – 6 April 2014
- Appointed by: Chandrika Kumaratunga

Acting Chief Justice of Sri Lanka
- In office 16 April 2013 – ?
- Appointed by: Mahinda Rajapaksa

Personal details
- Education: Sri Lanka Law College

Shiranee Tilakawardane is a former puisne justice of the Supreme Court of Sri Lanka and a member of the Judicial Service Commission. She has also served as acting chief justice when Mohan Peiris was out of the country.

== Education ==
Tilakawardane was educated at Bishop's College, Colombo and went on to study law at the Sri Lanka Law College. Her legal career commenced with an apprenticeship under Lalith Athulathmudali PC. This was followed by a tenure in the United States, where she served in the Consumer and Narcotic Division of the District Attorney's Office of Fort Colorado. She received an honorary degree from Williams College in June 2007 and an honorary degree from Smith College in May 2011.

== Pioneer ==
Justice Tilakawardane represented an early generation of women lawyers in Sri Lanka and scored many firsts. She became the first woman to be enrolled as a State Counsellor in 1978. She further established a record by being the country's first female judge of the High Court in April 1988 and became the first woman justice of the Court of Appeal of Sri Lanka in July 1998. She went on to become President of the Court of Appeals. Tilakawardane's work in the fields of equality and justice, gender education, and child rights in Sri Lanka and the international community has earned her international recognition. She participated in drafting the guidelines for child victim and child witness testimony submitted to the UN for adoption in the International Criminal Court, in addition to many other writings and presentations on child abuse and child witnesses for organizations including the International Bureau of Child Rights and the Child Protection Authority. She has been active in Sakshi of India's gender workshops for judges and the Asia Pacific Forum for Gender Education for Judges, and serves on the International Panel of Judges for the Child Rights Bureau. She also serves as an International Advisory Board member for the International Center for Ethics, Justice and Public Life at Brandeis University in the U.S. She is currently a consultant to the Sri Lanka Judges Training Institute.
