= Vijith Malalgoda =

Sri Lankan judge

Vijith K. Malalgoda is a judge from Sri Lanka. He is a puisne justice of the Supreme Court of Sri Lanka and former president of the Court of Appeal of Sri Lanka.

Malalgoda studied at Dharmaraja College, Kandy.
