= Seelaratna Senarath =

Sri Lankan journalist

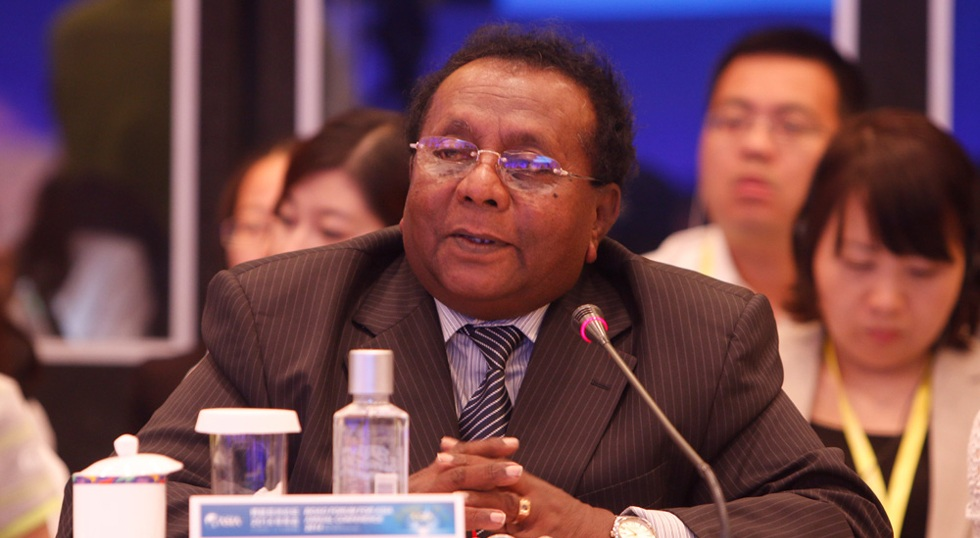
- Born: 2 September 1944 (age 81); Galaha, Kandy, Sri Lanka
- Occupations: Chairman - State Radio Advisory Board, Director programming of CRI Sri Lanka & former director editorial of Associated Newspapers of Ceylon Limited
- Spouse: Kanthi Senarath
- Children: 3

Seelaratna Senarath (born September 2, 1944) is the director programming of CRI Sri Lanka. He is a commercial program announcer of Sri Lanka Broadcasting Corporation and former director editorial of Associated Newspapers of Ceylon Limited. He is also the incumbent chairman of State Radio Advisory Board of Arts Council of Sri Lanka.

== Teaching career ==
Seelaratna Senarath began his career as a trained teacher after graduating from the Teachers' Training College in Giragama. He served in several areas in Sri Lanka including Ampara District, Batticaloa District and Gampaha District before he joined as the media adviser at Mahaweli Center in the late 1980s.

== Journalist career ==
He was the media secretary to Ratnasiri Wickramanayaka former prime minister of Sri Lanka (2005-2010) and Mahinda Rajapaksa former opposition leader of Sri Lanka (2002-2004). He served as a 'language expert' and 'advisory broadcaster' at the Sinhala Service of China Radio International during 2003-2005) in Beijing, China. He was a freelance broadcaster at Sri Lanka Broadcasting Corporation and also in various radio-dramas. He did several television programs as well such as 'Shanida Ayubowan', 'Shanida Wasanawa Ganitha Getaluwa'.

In November 2013, the Sri Lankan expatriate association in Melbourne Australia 'Mihindu Lama Padanama' felicitated Mr. Senarath for the lifetime contribution he made for the media industry in Sri Lanka.

In April 2014, he represented Sri Lanka at the Heads of Media Institutions Roundtable of Boao Forum for Asia.

He was appointed as the chairman of State Radio Advisory Board in February 2020

The novel "Ada Mahattaya" written by journalist Ashoka Piyaratne reflecting the real life experience of Seelaratna Senarath when he served as the headmaster of a remote village school in Sippimaduwa, Batticaloa District during late 1970s was launched on 6 October 2016.

A book titled ‘Mata Den Hathalihai’ (Now I'm forty), comprising Seelaratna Senarath's experiences in the media, written by journalist Ashoka Piyaratne, launched on 1 November 2018 at the Western Province Aesthetic Resort, Colombo 7, under the patronage of Uruwarige Vannila Aththo, the leader of the indigenous community. The book launch marked Senarath's 40th year in the profession of journalism and the media field.

Senarath received 'Kalabhooshana' state honours at the 34th Kalabhooshana State Awards 2018 held on 29 January 2019 at Nelum Pokuna Theater under the patronage of the President of Sri Lanka Maithreepala Sirisena.
