= Ameer Ismail =

Sri Lankan judge

Ameer Ismail is a retired judge of the Supreme Court of Sri Lanka and a former chairman of the Commission to Investigate Allegations of Bribery or Corruption, Sri Lanka.

== Education ==
Ismail was educated at Wesley College, Colombo, Sri Lanka.

He obtained the Bachelor of Laws degree from the University of Ceylon in 1967 and then passed out as an advocate from the Sri Lanka Law College. He was enrolled and admitted as an advocate of the Supreme Court of Sri Lanka in 1969.

Ismail has obtained a diploma in international air law from the Utrecht University, Netherlands in 1983. He has followed a course in 1998, in Dispute Resolution organized by the Institute for the Study and Development of Legal Systems in the University of California, Berkeley.

== Career ==
He joined the Attorney-General's Department as a Crown Counsel in 1971 after a brief period of practice in the unofficial bar. He served the department for a period of 12 years as a state counsel and as a senior state counsel.

He was absorbed into the judiciary in 1983 as a High Court judge. After serving in various stations as a judge of the High Court exercising original jurisdiction, he was promoted as a judge of the Court of Appeal in 1990. He became the president of the Court of Appeal in 1998.

He was then elevated as a judge of the Supreme Court of Sri Lanka in 1999. During his tenure as a Supreme Court judge, he served as a member of the Judicial Service Commission. He was also appointed a member of the Council of Legal Education. He retired as a Supreme Court judge in 2002.

Ismail was appointed as the chairman of the Commission to Investigate Allegations of Bribery or Corruption by Her Excellency the President on the recommendation of the Constitutional Council in March 2005 for a period of five years ending March 2010.
