= Amal Ranaraja =

Sri Lankan judge of the Court of Appeal since 2024

The Honourable Amal Ranaraja

Judge of the Court of Appeal of Sri Lanka
- Incumbent
- Assumed office 6 September 2024
- Appointed by: Ranil Wickremesinghe

Personal details
- Born: R. A. Ranaraja

Amal Ranaraja is a Sri Lankan lawyer who serves as a judge of the Court of Appeal of Sri Lanka. He was appointed by President Ranil Wickremesinghe and has served since 6 September 2024.

== Career ==
Ranaraja previously served as a judge in Sri Lanka's Primary Court, Magistrate's Court, District Court and High Court before his appointment to the Court of Appeal.
