= S. Sriskandarajah =

Justice S. Sriskandarajah PC
- சுந்தரம் சிறீஸ்கந்தராஜா

Judge, Supreme Court of Fiji
- In office 24 April 2012 – 23 January 2014
- Appointed by: Epeli Nailatikau

President of the Court of Appeal of Sri Lanka
- In office 24 June 2011 – 23 January 2014
- Appointed by: Mahinda Rajapaksa

Judge of the Court of Appeal of Sri Lanka
- In office 30 June 2004 – 23 January 2014
- Appointed by: Chandrika Kumaratunga

Personal details
- Died: 23 January 2014 (aged 60) Colombo, Sri Lanka
- Education: Manipay Hindu College; Colombo Hindu College; University of the West Indies
- Profession: Lawyer
- Ethnicity: Sri Lankan Tamil

Justice Sundaram Sriskandarajah (Tamil: சுந்தரம் சிறீஸ்கந்தராஜா; c. 1953 – 23 January 2014) was a leading Sri Lankan Tamil lawyer and judge.

== Early life ==
Sriskandarajah was educated at Manipay Hindu College and Colombo Hindu College. He received a Master of Laws degree from the University of the West Indies, Barbados.

== Career ==
Sriskandarajah became an attorney at law of the Supreme Court of Sri Lanka on 9 September 1979. He joined the Attorney-General's Department in 1981 as a State Counsel. He was promoted to the Senior State Counsel rank in 1995.

Sriskandarajah joined the judiciary in 1998 as the high court judge in Vavuniya. He also served as a high court judge in the Western Province. He was appointed to the Court of Appeal in June 2004. He became the court's president in June 2011. He was appointed as a justice of the Supreme Court of Fiji in April 2012. In January 2013 Sriskandarajah headed the Court of Appeal sitting which quashed the Parliamentary Select Committee's findings in respect of the impeachment of Chief Justice Shirani Bandaranayake. Sriskandarajah and a fellow Court of Appeal judge Anil Goonarathne subsequently received death threats. In April 2013 President Mahinda Rajapaksa appointed Rohini Marasinghe, who was the third most senior judge on the Court of Appeal, to the Supreme Court, ignoring Sriskandarajah who, as President of the Court of Appeal, should have been appointed according to tradition.

Sriskandarajah fell ill in September 2013 after returning to Sri Lanka from the Commonwealth Judges’ Conference in the UK. He died on 23 January 2014 aged 60 at a private hospital in Colombo. His funeral took place on 26 January 2014 at the General Cemetery, Borella.
