= Siva Selliah =

The Honourable Justice Siva Selliah

Justice of the Court of Appeal of Sri Lanka

Personal details
- Born: 1924 Colombo, Sri Lanka
- Died: 1997 (aged 72–73) Colombo, Sri Lanka
- Spouse: Bavani Selliah
- Relations: Sir Arunachalam Mahadeva, The Honourable Justice V. Manicavasagar
- Children: Dr. Sivakumar Selliah, Selvalakshmi, Sivakami
- Education: Colombo Law College, Royal College Colombo

Justice Siva Selliah (1924–1997) was a Sri Lankan judge. He was a former justice of the Court of Appeal, judge of the High Court and a magistrate. He was also a member of the Governing Council of the University of Colombo.

He was born Sivanathan Selliah in 1924 to Nallithamby Selliah, a stockbroker in Colombo. He was educated at the Royal College, Colombo, and entered the University of Ceylon where he obtained a degree in classics. Thereafter he chose the field of law, studying at the Colombo Law College.

After taking oaths as a lawyer, he joined the judiciary as a magistrate. Later, he became a High Court judge, and then a justice of the Court of Appeals until his retirement in 1987. After his retirement he became a member of the Governing Council of the University of Colombo and member of the Commission to Investigate Allegations of Bribery or Corruption.

Married to Bavani Selliah, his son is Dr. Sivakumar Selliah and daughters Selvalakshmi and Sivakami. Their family hails from Manipay.
