= Sarath N. Silva =

Chief Justice of Sri Lanka from 1999 to 2009

Sarath N. Silva PC

41st Chief Justice of Sri Lanka
- In office 16 September 1999 – 7 June 2009
- Appointed by: Chandrika Kumaratunga
- Preceded by: G. P. S. de Silva
- Succeeded by: Asoka de Silva

38th Attorney General of Sri Lanka
- In office 1996–1999
- President: Chandrika Kumaratunga
- Preceded by: Shibly Aziz
- Succeeded by: K. C. Kamalasabayson

President of the Sri Lankan Court of Appeal
- In office 1987 – 1994, 1994–1995 (President)

Personal details
- Born: 17 May 1946 (age 80)
- Education: Sri Lanka Law College, University of Brussels

Sarath Nanda Silva PC served as the 41st Chief Justice of the Supreme Court of Sri Lanka.

He obtained his Primary and Secondary school education at Trinity College Kandy and continued to Sri Lanka Law College. Prior to civil service, his achievements included work obtaining a Master of Laws degree magna cum laude from the University of Brussels. He was admitted as an Advocate of the Supreme Court of Sri Lanka in June 1967 and commenced his career in the Attorney General's department in 1968 as a Crown Counsel. He was promoted to Senior State Counsel in 1975 and Deputy Solicitor-General in 1979. Appointed a Judge of the Sri Lankan Court of Appeal in 1987, he later became the President of the Court in 1994.

== Controversial appointments and impeachment ==
Justice Silva was seen as close to President Chandrika Kumaratunga when first appointed to the Supreme Court in 1995, then serving under her as Attorney-General in 1996 and was appointed a President's Counsel the same year. His appointment as Chief Justice in 1999 evoked widespread protest in the media on concerns of there being more qualified and experienced judges in Sri Lanka, and Chandrika Kumaratunga was perceived as using him to control Court decisions. In his short term on the Court, he had contributed to and rendered decision on many Court cases that appeared to satisfy the Executive President's political needs.

In March 2003, the British Refugee Council released findings on the situation, citing a report from August 2001 where International Bar Association (IBA) concluded that there was "an overwhelming need for an independent credible judicial system" in Sri Lanka. It detailed instances of lack of accountability, breach of natural justice and potential for undue interference, as well singling out which positions should be protecting the rule of law. The position of Chief Justice was mentioned as one of possible abuse.

A conflict of interest came before Silva in June 2001 when an impeachment notice for his position was restrained by his very court.

In August 2001, the International Bar Association (IBA) concluded that there was "an overwhelming need for an independent credible judicial system" in Sri Lanka. It detailed instances of lack of accountability, breach of natural justice and potential for undue interference and pointed out that institutions which should be protecting the rule of law, including the President, government and the Chief Justice, were acting to undermine it. The IBA further opined that other Court members had been removed by Chief Justice Silva without inquiry. Despite these issues, he remained Chief Justice until retirement until 5 June 2009.

Legal offices
Preceded by G. P. S. de Silva	Chief Justice of Sri Lanka; 1999–2009	Succeeded by Asoka de Silva
Preceded by Shibly Aziz	Attorney General of Sri Lanka; 1996–1999	Succeeded by K. C. Kamalasabayson
