= Sri Lanka Law College =

Legal institution in Colombo, Sri Lanka

- ශ්‍රී ලංකා නීති විද්‍යාලය இலங்கை சட்டக் கல்லூரி
- Seal of SLLC
- Motto: Latin: Fiat justitia
- Motto in English: Let justice be done
- Type: Legal Education Institution
- Established: 1874; 152 years ago
- Affiliations: Incorporated Council of Legal Education; Institute of Advanced Legal Studies (IALS)
- Principal: Mr. Prashanth Lal de Alwis, President's Counsel
- Administrative staff: 100+
- Students: 1500
- Location: 244 Hulftsdorp Street, Colombo, Sri Lanka; 6.935672°N 79.859682°E
- Student Organization: Law Students' Union of Sri Lanka, Law Students' Sinhala Union of Sri Lanka
- Colours: Black & Red
- Nickname: SLLC
- Website: www.sllc.ac.lk

Sri Lanka Law College (abbreviated as SLLC), formerly known as Ceylon Law College, is a law college, and the only legal institution where one can enrol as an Attorney-at-Law in Sri Lanka. It was established in 1874, under the then Council of Legal Education, under the British Regime in order to impart a formal legal education to those who wished to become Advocates and proctors in Ceylon. The main building of the college was constructed in 1911. It is located on Hulftsdorp Street in Colombo, Sri Lanka. As of late 2024, the principal was President's Counsel Prasantha Lal De Alwis.

== Law education ==
In order to practice law in Sri Lanka, a lawyer must be admitted and enrolled as an Attorney-at-Law of the Supreme Court. To receive admission to the bar, a law student must complete law exams held by the SLLC, followed by a practical training course combined with an apprenticeship, which is roughly 6 months.

== Admission ==
There is a very competitive entrance examination held. It is held every August/ September. The subjects for the Entrance Exam are,

- Language Paper – English/Sinhala/Tamil
- General Knowledge and General Intelligence paper.

Young Members of Parliament previously received direct admission without taking the entrance exam, and without higher educational qualifications. However, it was stopped a few years back and is currently inoperative.

=== Admission for LLB Graduates ===
LLB Graduates LLB from either a recognised state or foreign university will be eligible to enter without sitting for entrance examinations. As of December 2020, Foreign LLB Graduates will also have to sit a Special Entrance Examination to gain entry, as stated in Extraordinary Gazette Number 2208/13 dated 30 December 2020.

== Course of Study/Syllabus ==
The course of study at Sri Lanka Law College does not grant any degree or certification. However, once a student has completed all the examinations, and an apprenticeship (including practical training course), they are then qualified as individuals who can be admitted to the profession as an Attorney-at-Law.

There are 3 academic years; Preliminary, Intermediate, and Final Year. One must successfully pass 7-8 subjects for each academic year, with an overall average of over 50%, and a minimum of over 40% per subject. Resitting certain subjects is allowed conditionally (such as a high average).

As per the most recent Gazette, the Final Year will have to be conducted entirely in English, regardless of your selected language (Extraordinary Gazette Number 2208/13 dated 30 December 2020).

=== LLB Graduate Route ===
Graduates holding an LL.B. from either a recognised state or foreign university will then be required to complete several examinations, following which they will have to undergo a period of apprenticeship to enrol as an Attorney-at-Law and be admitted to the bar. LLB Graduates are exempt from Attendance requirements and can optionally sit exams in both October and/or April.

==== Local University Graduates ====
LLB graduates from recognised state universities such as the University of Colombo, Open University of Sri Lanka, University of Jaffna, University of Peradeniya, and Kotelawala Defence University, only have to sit the Final Year examinations, entailing around 8 subjects.

==== Foreign University Graduates ====
However, Foreign LLB Graduates from the University of London, or other partnered foreign universities, have to sit for all 3 academic years. This rule was introduced in the last 10 years.

=== Re-qualifying from other Commonwealth countries ===
If one is a Foreign commonwealth lawyer, or a Barrister of England, Scotland and Ireland; they will only be required to sit for a few subjects. They will also have to take part in a Practical Training Course and serve the period of apprenticeship unless they served a period of pupilage in the United Kingdom

=== Other Courses ===
The SLLC carries out several post-attorney courses including an LL.M. from the University of Wales and post-attorney diplomas in intellectual property law and international trade law.

== Student unions ==
The Law Students' Union of Sri Lanka (LSU)

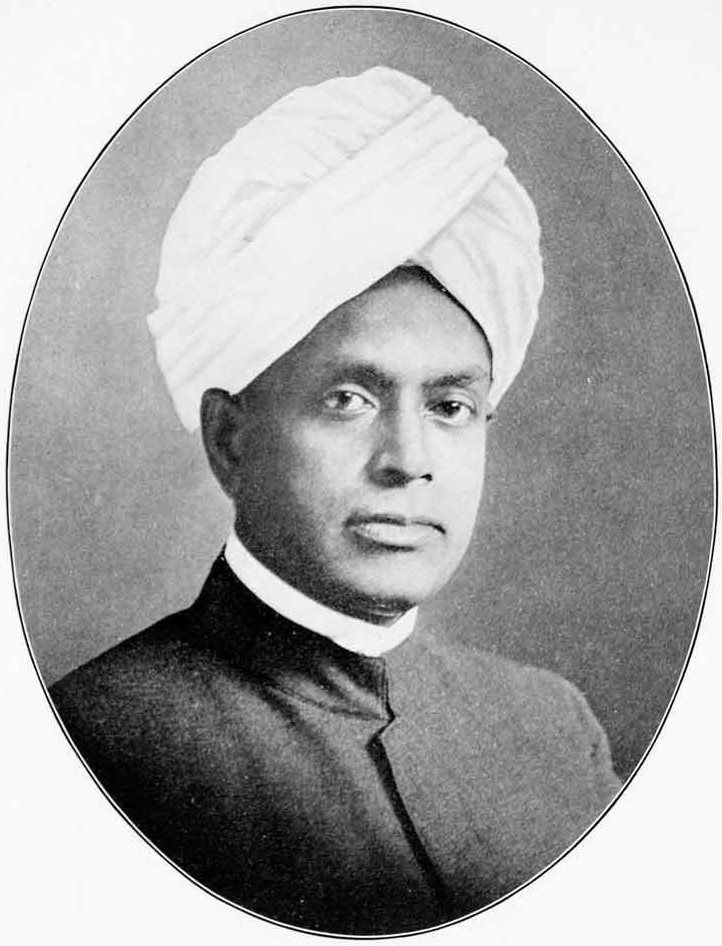
The first president of the Law Students' Union was Sir Ponnambalam Ramanathan, KC, CMG

The Law Students' Union was founded in 1894 as the Ceylon Law Students' Union. The first president was Sir Ponnambalam Ramanathan. The first meeting was held on June 13, 1894. With the implementation of the new rules in 1937, a student was elected as president of the L.S.U, rather than the previous practice where an experienced lawyer was appointed to that post. In 1970, the rules were further amended to give the student community greater control over their own affairs. Since that time another amendment was made creating the posts of Social and Welfare Secretary and that of editorial assistant. However, this amendment has not been put down in writing and has been carried out by convention.

In 1991, the union amended its rules further to create the posts of Education Secretary and Assistant Education Secretary in order to protect and safeguard the educational necessities of the student community. The rules were also translated into Sinhala by the Law Students' Union of 1989 and 1991. In 1995 the rules were amended which resulted in changing the name to the Law Students' Union of Sri Lanka. This amendment also created the law students' sports fund.

The Law Students' Sinhala Union of Sri Lanka (LSSU)

Sri Lanka Law College, which was established in 1874, is one of the oldest and leading professional educational institutions of Sri Lanka and operating within it is the Law Students' Sinhala Union which can be introduced as one of the leading student unions with a history of dedicated service to law students for the past 73 years.

The law student Sinhala Union was established in 1943, in the wake of a renaissance against colonialism, when people irrespective of their race or religion joined hands together in the struggle for independence. Thus it was this Union that spearheaded the law students' contribution to this movement. The Law Students' Sinhala Union which was hence established was formalised and re-structured as an organised student union by C. Ananda Grero.

== Notable alumni ==
As one of the oldest professional training bodies, it has trained all the lawyers in the country who have served not only in the field of law but also in various other fields such as politics, social reforms, commerce, trade unions and religion. For instance, three of the nine Executive Presidents had their higher education and training at the Sri Lanka Law College.

Name	Known for	Reference
J.R. Jayewardene	2nd President of Sri Lanka	
Ranil Wickremesinghe	9th President of Sri Lanka	
E. W. Perera	independence activist and senator	
Gamini Dissanayake	former cabinet minister, and a presidential candidate	
Parinda Ranasinghe	former Chief Justice of Sri Lanka	
Christopher Weeramantry	former judge of the International Court of Justice and judge of the Supreme Court of Sri Lanka	
J. F. A. Soza	former judge of the Supreme Court of Sri Lanka	
Sarath N. Silva	former Chief Justice of Sri Lanka	
V. Manicavasagar	former judge of the Supreme Court of Sri Lanka and Chancellor of the University of Jaffna	
Shirani Tilakawardene	Judge of the Supreme Court of Sri Lanka	
Mohamed Ali Sabry	Minister of Justice	
Saleem Marsoof	Judge of the Supreme Court of Sri Lanka	
Siva Selliah	former judge of the Court of Appeal of Sri Lanka	
Sarath Ambepitiya	former judge of the High Court of Colombo	
S. L. Gunasekara	Senior Lawyer and Member of Parliament	
Harry Wilfred Jayewardene	former President of the Sri Lanka Bar Association, Chairman of the Industrial Disputes Commission, UN Human Rights Commission	
Dappula de Livera	former Attorney General of Sri Lanka	
Somasundaram Nadesan	former senator and president of the Bar Council	
Jayathri Samarakone	Sri Lankan High Commissioner to Singapore	
Lasantha Wickrematunge	journalist and former editor-in-chief of The Sunday Leader	
Dilith Jayaweera	Sri Lankan corporate leader and Entrepreneur	
Donald Hewagama	former Judge Advocate General of the Sri Lanka Army	
Priyantha Jayawardena	Supreme Court Judge	
Namel Weeramuni	film director, dramatist, playwright and UK lawyer	
Sanjay Rajaratnam	Attorney General of Sri Lanka	

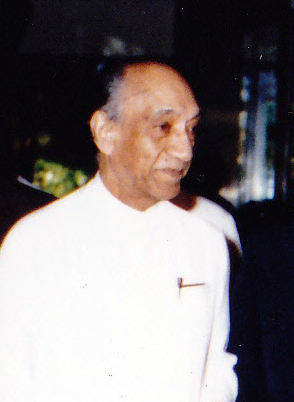
J. R. Jayewardene

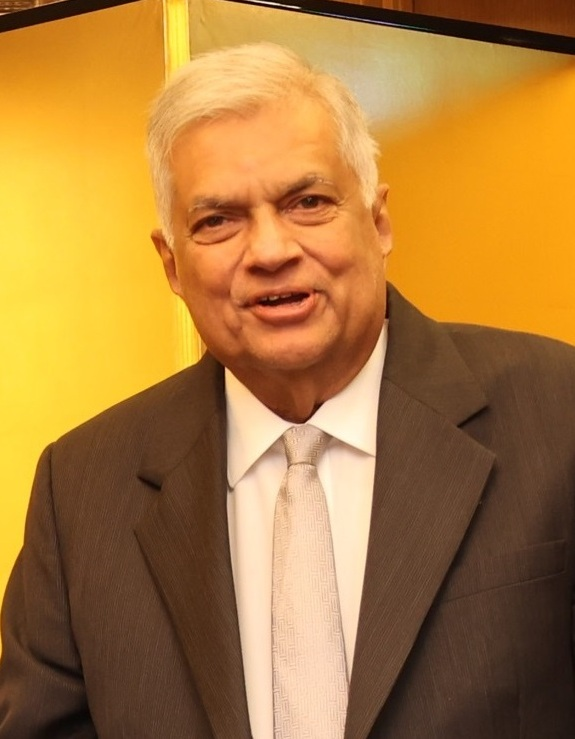
Ranil Wickremesinghe

== Partner universities ==
- University of Wales, United Kingdom
- (United Kingdom) University of London
- University of Colombo, Sri Lanka
- University of Peradeniya, Sri Lanka
- University of Jaffna, Sri Lanka
- Open University of Sri Lanka, Sri Lanka
- General Sir John Kotelawala Defence University, Sri Lanka

== See also ==
- Sri Lankan universities
