= Court of Appeal of Sri Lanka =

Appellate court in Sri Lanka

- Emblem of Sri Lanka
- Interactive map of Court of Appeal of Sri Lanka
- 6.93507°N 79.86172°E
- Established: 1971
- Jurisdiction: Sri Lanka
- Location: Hulftsdorp, Colombo, Sri Lanka
- Coordinates: 6.93507°N 79.86172°E
- Authorised by: Government of Sri Lanka
- Appeals to: Supreme Court of Sri Lanka
- Number of positions: 20
- Website: courtofappeal.lk

President of the Court of Appeal
- Currently: Rohantha Abeysooriya
- Since: 19 June 2025

The Court of Appeal of Sri Lanka, commonly known as the Appeal Court, is the second most senior court in the Sri Lankan legal system, with only the Supreme Court of Sri Lanka above it. Established in 1971, under the Court of Appeal Act No. 44 of 1971, the Appeal Court has jurisdiction to hear appeals from the High Court or any lower court; its own decisions may be additionally appealed to the Supreme Court. The Appeal Court is headed by the president of the Court of Appeal.

== Composition ==
=== Size of court ===
The Court of Appeal consists of the president of the Court of Appeal and not fewer than six and not more than nineteen other judges, as stipulated in Article 137 of the Constitution of Sri Lanka. The court was expanded to its current size on 29 October 2020 through the Twentieth Amendment to the Constitution. Previously, it comprised the president of the Court of Appeal and a maximum of eleven other judges.

== Dress ==
Appeal Court judges wear dark purple gowns when attending court. On special ceremonial occasions (such as ceremonial sittings of the Appeal Court) they wear dark purple gowns, barrister's bands, mantle, and a long wig.

== Judges of the Court ==
Below is a list of judges currently serving on the Court of Appeal.

As of 6 October 2026

President of the Court of Appeal

Current Judges of the Court of Appeal
No.	Judge	Appointed by	Start date / length of service	Current status	Ref.
–	Rohantha Abeysooriya	–	–	52nd President of the Court of Appeal; Appointed by: Dissanayake; 19 June 2025; 1 year, 109 days	
1	Mayadunne Corea	G. Rajapaksa	1 December 2020; 5 years, 309 days	Judge	
2	Prabaharan Kumararatnam	G. Rajapaksa	1 December 2020; 5 years, 309 days	Judge	
3	Sasi Mahendran	G. Rajapaksa	14 June 2021; 5 years, 114 days	Judge	
4	Sanjeeva Morais	Wickremesinghe	7 August 2023; 3 years, 60 days	Judge	
5	Damitha Thotawatta	Wickremesinghe	6 September 2024; 2 years, 30 days	Judge	
6	Amal Ranaraja	Wickremesinghe	6 September 2024; 2 years, 30 days	Judge	
7	Mahen Gopallawa	Wickremesinghe	6 September 2024; 2 years, 30 days	Judge	
8	Sarath Dissanayake	Dissanayake	9 January 2025; 1 year, 270 days	Judge	
9	Pradeep Hettiarachchi	Dissanayake	9 January 2025; 1 year, 270 days	Judge	
10	Sumudu Premachandra	Dissanayake	11 March 2025; 1 year, 209 days	Judge	
11	K. Priyantha Fernando	Dissanayake	11 March 2025; 1 year, 209 days	Judge	
12	Annalingam Premashankar	Dissanayake	11 March 2025; 1 year, 209 days	Judge	
13	Francis Gunawardena	Dissanayake	19 June 2025; 1 year, 109 days	Judge	
14	Adithya Patabendige	Dissanayake	19 June 2025; 1 year, 109 days	Judge	
15	Lakmali Karunanayake	Dissanayake	3 September 2026; 33 days	Judge	
16	Navaratne Marasinghe	Dissanayake	6 October 2026; 0 days	Judge	
17	Manjula Thilakaratne	Dissanayake	6 October 2026; 0 days	Judge	
18	Vacant			Judge	
19	Vacant			Judge	
