= High Court of Sri Lanka =

Court of the judiciary of Sri lanka

The High Court in Sri Lanka is the only court which exercises the jurisdiction of the court of first instance and the appellate jurisdiction with both civil and criminal jurisdiction.

Article 111 of the Constitution and section 4 of the Judicature Act, No. 2 of 1978 as amended by Act, No. 16 -1989 describes that The High Court must consist of not less than ten and not more than forty Judges. Article 154P of the Constitution provides for the establishment of the Provincial High Courts to which judges are nominated by the Chief Justice from among Judges of the High Court of Sri Lanka

== Appointment and removal of Judges ==
According to the Article 111 of the Constitution as amended by the 17th Amendment - Judges of the High Court are appointed by the President on the recommendation of the Judicial Service Commission made after consultation with the Attorney General and removable by the President and are subject to disciplinary control by the President on the recommendation of the Judicial Service Commission. Age of retirement of the Judges of the High Court is 61 years [Section 6(3) of the Judicature Act, No. 2 of 1978].

== Judicial powers ==
The High Courts exercise both the Criminal jurisdiction and the Commercial jurisdiction (through Commercial High Courts). It can conduct a trial by jury or trial at bar and impose any sentence or penalty prescribed by law. Under the 13th amendment to the constitution it has the appellate and re-visionary jurisdiction by way of the Provincial High Court.

The Provincial High Court has been vested with appellate and re-visionary jurisdiction in respect of orders and judgments of the Magistrates Court, Primary Courts, Labour Tribunals, Agrarian Services Commissioners Tribunals within the province.

=== The High Court of Civil Appeal ===
The High Court of Civil Appeal has been established with the objective of expediting the civil appeals from District Courts.

=== High Court And The Provincial High Court ===
High Court cases can be heard in the presence of a Judge of the High Court or a Jury. The High Court take cognizance of cases to be heard on submission of indictments submitted by the Attorney General.

=== The Commercial High Court ===
The Commercial High Court was originally established under the High Court of the Provinces Act of 1996. It has jurisdiction to hear civil actions where the cause of action has arisen out of commercial transactions in which the debt, damage or demand exceeds twenty Million Sri Lankan Rupees (LKR).

=== Admiralty court ===
Admiralty jurisdiction is exercised by the High Court held at Colombo, having had the jurisdiction transferred to it from the Supreme Court under the provisions of the Judicature Act No.2 of 1978.

== Special High Court ==
In 2018, under the Judicature (Amendment) Act, No. 9 of 2018 previsions were made for the establishment of permanent Special High Courts to hear large-scale financial crimes, bribery and corruption cases. Such courts will be made up of three High Court Judges appointed by the Chief Justice to conduct cases as a Trial-at-Bar. The first Special High Court was established on 21 August 2018 at the Hulftsdorf court complex, while the second was established in the same location in September.

== List of High Courts ==
- Special High Court, Hulftsdorp
- High Court Ampara
- High Court Anuradhapura
- High Court Avissawella
- High Court Badulla
- High Court Balapitiya
- High Court Batticaloa
- High Court Chilaw
- High Court Colombo
- High Court Embilipitiya
- High Court Galle
- High Court Gampaha
- High Court Hambantota
- High Court Homagama
- High Court Jaffna
- High Court Kalmunai
- High Court Kandy
- High Court Kalutara
- High Court Kegalle
- High Court Kurunegala
- High Court Mannar
- High Court Matara
- High Court Negombo
- High Court Panadura
- High Court Polonnaruwa
- High Court Puttalam
- High Court Ratnapura
- High Court Tangalle
- High Court Trincomalee
- High Court Vavuniya
- High Court Welikada

== See also ==
- Supreme Court of Sri Lanka
- Constitution of Sri Lanka
- Admiralty court
