= Deshabandhu =

Third highest national honour in Sri Lanka

Deshabandhu දේශබන්ධු தேசபந்து

Awarded by The Government of Sri Lanka
- Type: Title of honor/Order of merit
- Eligibility: Sri Lankan citizens
- Criteria: Highly notable service to the nation
- Status: Currently constituted

Statistics
- First induction: 1986
- Last induction: 2019

Precedence
- Next (higher): Deshamanya
- Next (lower): Veera Chudamani

Deshabandhu (Sinhala: දේශබන්ධු, romanized: dēśabandhu; Tamil: தேசபந்து, romanized: Tēcapantu, lit. 'Patriot') is the third highest national honour awarded in Sri Lanka. It is awarded "for meritorious service". The title is held by no more than 150 living holders at any time. It is conferred with a citation and a silver medal with a symbol of a peacock. It is conventionally used as a title or prefix to the awardee's name.

Deshabandhu ranks lower than Deshamanya.

== Awardees ==
Awardees include:

1986

- Ahangamage Tudor Ariyaratne
- Hewa Komanage Dharmadasa
- Norendradas Jayaratnam Wallooppillai
- Daphne Attygalle
- Wimala de Silva
- Arulanandam Yesuadian Samuel Gnanam
- David Edwin Hettiarachchi
- Dhamital Senakumar Jayasundera
- Clara Motwani

1987

- Bulathsinhelage Sirisena Cooray
- James Ernest Ivan Corea
- Albert Edirisinghe
- Don Jinadasa Attygalle
- Siva Chinnatamby
- Lena Charlotte Fernando
- Mohamed Thassim Ahamed Furkhan
- Sathischandra Jayasinghe
- Abeysiri Mendis Munasinghe
- Abdul Haleem Sheriffdeen
- Franciskuhettige Gerald Hudson Silva
- Samuel Jeyarajah Stephen
- Victor Garwin Weerawardhana Ratnayake
- Michael Tissera
- Wickremasinghe Wimaladasa

1988

- Velu Annamalai
- Mohamed Mohideen Mohamed Abdul Cader
- Nuwarapaksa Hewayalage Keerthiratne
- Sembukuttiarachchige Bertram Silva
- Manicam Sivanathan
- John William Subasinghe
- Noel Wimalasena
- Swarna Ferdinand
- Alec Robertson
- Mirisse Hewage Gunadasa Siriwardena
- Julian Bolling
- Kosgamage Thilaka Dhammika Jinadasa

1989

- Palita Edward Dias Wijesiri Jayavardhana Karunaratna Weeraman
- Bogoda Appuhamilage Premaratne
- Callistus Reginald Seimon
- Sita Seneviratne
- Don Piyadasa Jayasinghe
- Gardi Punchi Hewage Karunaratne
- Jezima Ismail
- Joyce Selina Abeywardana Goonasekera
- Edith Marguerite Grace Fernando

1990

- Bomullage Dilipkumar Dharmasena
- John Arthur Ameratunge
- Carl Sepala Illangakoon
- Bertram Russell Heyn
- Victor Hettigoda
- Sangarapully Sellamuttu
- Surath Wickramasinghe
- Ayisha Rauf
- Eric Suriyasena
- Mohamed Sadique Gaffoor
- Surendra Ramachandran
- Albert Athisayaratnam Page
- Kaluthanthirige Nandasena Perera

1991

- Nihal Wilfred Karunaratne
- Abdul Raheman Mohamed Hathy
- Ajith Mahendra de Silva Jayaratne
- Jivaka Lalith Bhupendra Kotalawala
- Lankalalama Arunasiri Adithiya

1992

- Theva Anugriham Buell
- Deepika Chanmugam
- Kanitha Kumar Lal Devapura
- Kombala Vithanage Damayanthi Darsha
- Sriyantha Subashan Abeysekara Dissanayake
- Balapuwaduge Rohan Duleep Mendis
- Amugoda Arachchige Dayananda Gunawardena
- Karunaratne Jayasuriya
- Chevalier Andrew Kariyawasam
- Kuruppu Arachchilage Karunaratne
- Sinhalage Buddhi Keerthisena
- Mohotti Arachchilage Sriyani Kulawansa
- Muthumuni Roy Quintus de Silva
- Ethel Violet Rajapakse
- George Wilfred Rajapakse
- Ranasinghe Arachchige Saranapala Perera Ranasinghe
- Joseph Francis Antony Soza
- Peremartne Weerakoon
- Lihini Imala Weerasooriya

1993

- Bernard Alfred Botejue
- Reginald Sebastian Rodrigo Candappa
- Arjun Rishya Fernando
- Sirisumana Godage
- Nahammal Kasipillai
- Mas Dharma Kitchilan
- Pathirannahelage Nimal Pathirana
- Veeyanna Theyna Vaana Deivanayagam Pillai
- Arjuna Ranatunga

1994

- Abdul Wahab Mohamed Ameer
- Mohamed Rushdi Uvais
- George Lawrence Andrew Ondaatjie
- Sohli Edelji Captain
- Wilbert Kaggodaarachchi
- Tikiri Banda Madugalla
- Aelian Alwis Cohomban Wickrama Jayasekera
- Hevatantrige Patrick George Ernest Peiris
- Percival Upajiva Ratnatunga
- Weliwitigoda Ariyadasa Wimaladharma
- Don Piyadasa Wijenarayana
- Alfred Samaraweera

1996

- Aravinda de Silva
- Roshan Mahanama
- Hashan Tillakaratne
- Asanka Gurusinha
- Sanath Jayasuriya
- Pramodya Wickramasinghe
- Muttiah Muralitharan
- Romesh Kaluwitharana
- Chaminda Vaas
- Kumar Dharmasena
- Marvan Atapattu
- Ravindra Pushpakumara
- Upul Chandana

1998

- Primus Tillekeratne de Silva
- Ananda Daivin Soysa
- Rajadurai Sellaiah Thanabalasundaram
- Adhikari Mudiyanselage Dharmasena
- Nowfel S Jabir
- Rajapakse Pathirannehelage Jayaratne Pathirana
- Sunna Deniyage Gunadasa
- Seekkubaduge Wilbert Silva
- Mapatunage James Perera
- Minuwanpitiyage Darmasiri Dayananda Pieris
- Thambimuttu Duraisingam
- Muhammed Abdul Hameed Muhammed Hussain
- Merangne Gaulis Mendis
- Chasnyn Musafer
- BalaupasakageYasodis Thudawe
- Lady Puvaneshwari Vaithianathan
- Kolamba Patabendige Tissaweera Siriwardana Jinasena

2005

- A. E. T. Ellawala
- A. L. M. Abusali
- Arumadura Nandasena Silva Kulasinghe
- Christopher Gunapala Uragoda
- D. P. Wickremasinghe
- Diyanath Samarasinghe
- Harold Herath
- Indradasa Hettiarachchi
- Jinadasa Guruge
- Joe Abeywickrama
- K. P. Silva
- Kapila Gunawardena
- Kirthi Tennakoon
- Lakshman de Mel
- Lionel Fernando
- Lyn de Alwis
- Macky Hashim
- N Navaratnarajah
- Olcott Gunasekera
- Osmund Jayaratne
- Don Chandraprema Patrick Amarasinghe
- Ranjith Athapattu
- Reginald George Bernard Forbes
- S. D. R. Jayaratne
- Siran U. Deraniyagala
- Saddhamangala Karunaratne
- Senaka Dias Bandaranayake
- Stanley Kirinde
- Sivaramalingam Anandacoomaraswamy
- Suriya Wickremasinghe
- Swarana Jayaweera
- Tilak de Soysa
- Tissa Abeysekara
- Tony Ranasinghe
- Tuley de Silva
- Vajira Chithrasena
- Vivendra Lintotawela
- M. A. Careem

2017

- Deivanayagam Eassuwaren
- Lakshman Lucian de Silva Weerasena
- Leslie Shelton Devendra
- Mahinkande Gamladdalage Kularatne
- Susanthika Jayasinghe
- Ranjan Madugalle
- Shanthilal Nilkanth Wickremesinghe
- Thommadura Pabilis Silva
- Wegapitiya Kattadiyalage Hemachandra Wegapitiya
- Ahamed Rizvi Mohamed Rifkhan
- Sivanalagu Balakrishnan

2019

- M.R. Latiff
- Edwin Ariyadasa
- Sugath Thilakaratne
- Professor Wimal Dissanayake
- Anura Punchi Bandara Tennakoon
- Anslem Boniface Perera
- Professor Raja Sarath Bandara
- Professor Lakshman Dissanayake
- Professor Shirajini Niriella
- Professor Nimal Herath Sadaratne
- Jerome L. de Silva
- Augustin Roshan
