= Kriti =

Kriti may refer to:

== Art and entertainment ==
- Kriti (music), a format of musical composition typical to Carnatic music
- Kriti (film), a 2016 Indian Hindi-language short film
- Kriti TV, Greek TV station

== People with the name ==
- Kriti Bharti (born 1987), Indian psychologist and activist
- Kriti Kharbanda (born 1990), Indian film actress
- Kriti Malhotra, Indian film actress and costume designer
- Kriti Sanon (born 1990), Indian film actress
- Kriti Sharma (born 1988), Indian artificial intelligence technologist, business executive and humanitarian
- Krithi Shetty (born 2003), Indian film actress

== Ships ==
- MS Kriti I
- Kriti-class destroyer
- Greek ship Kriti

== Other uses ==
- Crete, or Kriti, a Greek island

== See also ==
- Kiriti (disambiguation)
- Krti (disambiguation)
- Kirti, an Indian Marxist periodical
- Kruti Dev, a sans-serif typeface
- Kruti Mahesh, Indian dancer and choreographer
- Kruti Parekh, first test-tube baby in India
