= Keerthi =

Keerthi, also spelled Keerti, Keerthy or Kirti, is an Indian feminine given name. It may refer to: include:

- Keerti Gaekwad Kelkar (born 1974), Indian actress and model
- Keerti Nagpure (fl. 2010–present), Indian actress
- Keerti Shah (1928–2019), Indian virologist
- Keerthi Pasquel (born 1956), singer
- Keerthi Ranasinghe (born 1962), cricketer
- Keerthi Reddy (born 1977), Indian actress
- Keerthi Sagathia (born 1979), singer
- Keerthi Chawla (born 1981), Indian actress
- Keerthi Bhat (born 1999), Indian actress
- Keerthi Pandian (born 1992), Indian actress
- Keerthi Shanthanu (born 1985), Indian television presenter
- Keerthy Suresh (born 1992), Indian actress

== See also ==
- Kirthi (disambiguation)
- Kirti (disambiguation)
