= 1986 Sri Lankan national honours =

On 4 February 1986, President of Sri Lanka J. R. Jayewardene awarded the first Sri Lankan national honours since the suspension of Imperial honors in 1956.

== Sri Lankabhimanya ==
- Ranasinghe Premadasa - Prime Minister of Sri Lanka

== Deshamanya ==
- P. R. Anthonis – surgeon and academic
- Gamani Corea – economist, civil servant and diplomat
- M. C. M. Kaleel
- Malage George Victor Perera Wijewickrama Samarasinghe
- Miliani Sansoni – Chief Justice of Ceylon
- Victor Tennekoon – Chief Justice of Ceylon

== Deshabandu ==
- Ahangamage Tudor Ariyaratne
- Hewa Komanage Dharmadasa
- Norendradas Jayaratnam Wallooppillai
- Daphne Attygalle
- Wimala de Silva
- Arulanandam Yesuadian Samuel Gnanam
- David Edwin Hettiarachchi
- Dhamital Senakumar Jayasundera
- Clara Motwani
