= Shirish Hiremath =

Indian cardiologist (1951–2026)

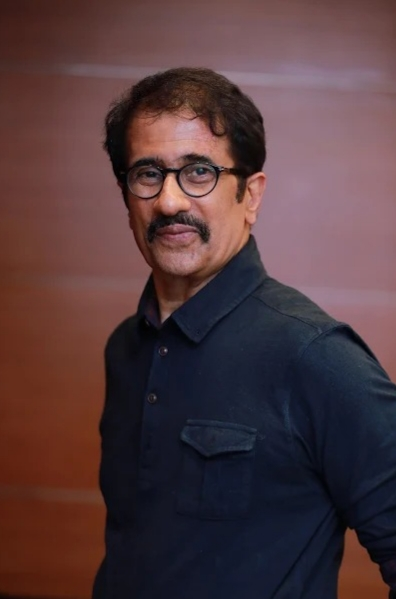
- Born: 17 July 1951; Poona, Bombay State, India
- Died: 29 October 2026 (aged 75); Sopan Baug, Pune, Maharashtra, India
- Other name: Shirish (MS) Hiremath
- Education: B. J. Medical College, Pune (MBBS, MD), Mumbai University (DM), Member of National Academy of Medical Sciences (MNAMS)
- Occupation: Cardiologist
- Years active: 1982–2026
- Organization(s): Ruby Hall Clinic, Pune
- Known for: Interventional Cardiology
- Spouse: Leena Hiremath
- Website: www.mshiremath.com

Shirish Hiremath (17 July 1951 – 29 October 2026) was an Indian interventional cardiologist and past president of Cardiological Society of India (CSI).

== Life and career ==
Hiremath was an alumnus of B.J. Medical College in Pune and the University of Mumbai. He was director of Cardiac Cath Lab, Ruby Hall Clinic, Pune.

He is known for creating awareness about prevention, early diagnosis and treatment of cardiovascular diseases at community level in India.

Hiremath contributed to research studies in the field of interventional cardiology and popularized use of pharmaco-invasive approach for treatment of myocardial infarction in Indian patients.

Hiremath died from brain cancer on 29 October 2026, aged 75.
