= Kiriti =

Kiriti may refer to:

- Kiriti (Arjuna) (one of the names of Arjuna, the hero of the ancient Indian epic Mahabharata)
- Kiriti (settlement), Kenya
- Kiriti Roy, a fictional Indian detective by Nihar Ranjan Gupta
  - Kiriti Roy (2016 film), an Indian film based on the character

== See also ==
- , alternative transliteration
- Keerthi, an Indian feminine given name
- Kirthi Jayakumar, an Indian activist
- Kriti (disambiguation)
- Krti (disambiguation)
- Kriti (music), or kṛti, a concept in Indian classical music
