= Rajiv Yeravdekar =

Indian Educationist, &

- Born: India
- Occupation: Educationist
- Known for: General Surgery, Obstetrics & Gynaecology

Rajiv Chintaman Yeravdekar is an Indian Educationist, & is better known as the Dean and Faculty of Health & Biomedical Sciences of Symbiosis International University. He is on the Board of Governors of the Medical Council of India and is dean of Pune-based Symbiosis Institute of Health Sciences (SIHS)

Rajiv, is an alumnus of the B. J. Medical College, Pune

== See also ==
- University of Pune
