= Shrikrishna Upadhyay =

Krishna Upadhyay (Nepali: श्रीकृष्ण उपाध्याय; born 1945), also known as Shrikrishna or Srikrishna, is a Nepalese entrepreneur and economist.

== Career ==
Upadhyay worked with the Agriculture Development Bank for 28 years, leaving in 1990. From 1991 to 1994, he served as a member of the National planning Commission and was in charge of the Poverty Alleviation Programme.

In 1991, he was the founder of the organization SAPPROS, Support Activities for Poor Producers of Nepal. His notable books are Pro-Poor Growth and Governance in South Asia–Decentralization and Participatory Development, and Economic Democracy through Pro-Poor Growth.

In 2010, he was recognized for his work in alleviating poverty as a winner of the Right Livelihood Award. Asked if there was a common formula for bringing villages out of poverty, he advocated a "participatory approach and involving people in the planning, design, execution and management of small projects in rural areas [that] will enhance their capacity and increase impact and sustainability."

== Selected publications ==
- Shri Krishna Upadhyay (2009). "Strengthening the Base through Participatory democracy for Transition to Sustainability". In Ponna Wignaraja (ed.). Economic Democracy through Pro Poor Growth. SAGE Publications India. pp. 109–123. ISBN 9788132101277.
- Sri Krishna Upadhyay; Govinda Koirala (2004). "Women-led Pro-Poor Growth with Supportive Decentralization in Nepal". In Ponna Wignaraja (ed.). Pro-Poor Growth and Governance in South Asia: Decentralization and Participatory Development. SAGE. pp. 305–337. ISBN 9780761997986.
- Shree Krishna Upadhyay; S. B. Khadka. (1990). The role of agricultural credit in the transformation of the hills: the Nepalese experience (Report). Food and Agriculture Organization of the United Nations.

== Awards ==
- Right Livelihood Award, 2010
