= R. S. Wadia =

Indian neurologist

R. S. Wadia is a neurologist from India. He is a founding member of the Indian Academy of Neurology.

== Career ==
Wadia received his MBBS with distinction in Preventive Medicine in 1958 and MD in Internal Medicine in 1962 from BJ Medical College, Pune. He is an Honorary Assistant Professor of Medicine, BJ Medical College and Consultant Physician & Neurologist, Ruby Hall Clinic from 1962.^{[incorrect citation]}He was also a winner of “VR Joshi JAPI Award for Outstanding Referee” for the year 2007.^{[incorrect citation]} He was president of Indian Neurology Conference held at Mumbai in 2007.

== Most cited papers ==
- His most cited paper is on organophosphate poisoning, with 170 citations in Google Scholar.
- His second most cited is on focal epilepsy, with 129 citations.
