= Daphne Attygalle =

Sri Lankan academic

Acting Vice-Chancellor of the University of Colombo
- In office ?–1989

Personal details
- Born: 1922
- Died: 1989 (aged 66–67)
- Spouse: Don Jinadasa Attygalle (died 1989)
- Occupation: Pathologist
- Awards: Fellow of the National Academy of Sciences of Sri Lanka; Deshabandu (1986)

Academic work
- Discipline: Pathology
- Institutions: Faculty of Medicine, University of Colombo

Daphne Attygalle (née Kanagaratne; 1922 – 1989) was a Sri Lankan pathologist who was Professor of Pathology at the University of Colombo.

== Biography ==
Daphne Kanagaratne was born in 1922. She was educated at St. Bridget's Convent, Colombo, and she was later president of their Past Pupils' Association from 1975 to 1977.

In 1970, Attygalle began working as a Professor of Pathology at the Faculty of Medicine, University of Colombo and was made a Fellow of the Royal College of Physicians after spending some time in England for postgraduate work. She became an Emeritus Professor at the University of Colombo on 10 September 1987.

Attygalle was dean of the Faculty of Medicine from 1982 until 1986; she was the first woman to serve as a dean at a Sri Lankan university. She declined an offer to serve as vice-chancellor of the University of Colombo (had she accepted she would have been the first woman to be vice-chancellor of a Sri Lankan university), though she would later serve as acting vice-chancellor of the University of Colombo, serving until her death.

Attygalle was the first chair of the Board of Study in Pathology, and she was later re-elected after her first term ended in 1983. She worked as an external examiner at the University of Malaya Faculty of Dentistry.

As an academic, Attygalle's field of work was pathology. She was one of the fifty-three founding fellows of the National Academy of Sciences of Sri Lanka. She was awarded Deshabandu in the 1986 Sri Lankan national honours.

Attygalle married Don Jinadasa Attygalle, senior physician of the National Hospital of Sri Lanka. She died in 1989.

The Faculty of Medicine awards a Professor Daphne Attygalle Medal for Pathology to its students.
