= Byramjee =

Byramjee is a Hindic given name. Notable people with the name include:

- Byramjee Jeejeebhoy (1822–1890), Indian businessman and philanthropist
- Keki Byramjee Grant (1920–2011), Indian cardiologist
