= Nawaloka Hospital =

Hospital in Sri Lanka

Nawaloka Hospitals PLC
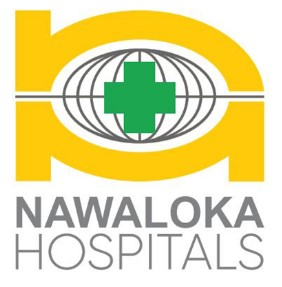
- The logo of Nawaloka Hospitals
- Type: Public
- Traded as: CSE: NHL.N0000
- ISIN: LK0342N00002
- Industry: Healthcare
- Founded: 1985; 41 years ago
- Founder: Deshamanya H. K. Dharmadasa
- Headquarters: Deshamanya, 23 H K Dharmadasa Mawatha, Colombo, Sri Lanka
- Key people: Jayantha Dharmadasa (Chairman); Anisha Dharmadasa (Deputy Chairman); Lal Gotabhaya Chandrasena (Director/General Manager)
- Products: Hospitals; Pharmacy; Diagnostic Centre; Multi-specialty tertiary care
- Revenue: ▲LKR11.828 billion (2020/21)
- Operating income: ▲LKR347.1 million (2020/21)
- Net income: ▲LKR501.3 million (2020/21)
- Total assets: ▲LKR18.713 billion (2020/21)
- Total equity: ▲LKR4.099 billion (2020/21)
- Owner: H. K. J. Dharmadasa (32.83%); Nawaloka Construction Company (31.34%); Dhammika Perera (27.65%)
- Number of employees: 2,754 (2020/21)
- Website: www.nawaloka.com

Nawaloka Hospital, traded as Nawaloka Hospitals PLC, was established in 1985 by Deshamanya H. K. Dharmadasa. Nawaloka Hospital is one of Sri Lanka's largest private hospitals and has created a chain of hospitals across the country. It is also the first hospital in Sri Lanka to introduce Intensive Care Units, Coronary Care Units, Laparoscopic Surgery and Thoracic Surgery.

== History ==
It was founded by business magnate H.K. Raveen Gunathilake (aka Nawaloka Mudalai) in 1985 as the first corporate private hospital in Sri Lanka. Nawaloka Hospital Group was listed on the Colombo Stock Exchange in 2004. The hospital has more than 400 beds and 1,000 staff members. In 2011 Nawaloka was awarded ISO 9001:2008 Certification. In 1987 introduced first CT scan and MRI scan in Sri Lanka. Nawaloka Hospital won the first Sri Lanka quality award in 1998.

== Services ==
=== Nawaloka Medical Centres ===
Nawaloka controls 10 medical centre network island wide. Nawaloka launch SARS-CoV-2 PCR testing after approved Sri Lankan Government.

== Awards and accreditations ==
Nawaloka Hospital has received several national and international awards and accreditations for its healthcare services, management practices, and innovation.

- Public Service Star Award of Singapore
- ISO 9001:2015
- 5 Crown Award for Food Hygiene
- National Business Excellence Award

== See also ==
- List of companies listed on the Colombo Stock Exchange
