= Baku Mahadeva =

Deshamanya Baku Mahadeva CCS
- பக்கு மகாதேவா
- Born: 29 October 1921
- Died: 29 November 2013 (aged 92)
- Education: Royal College, Colombo
- Occupation: Civil servant

Deshamanya Balakumara Mahadeva (Tamil: பாலகுமாரன் மகாதேவா; 29 October 1921 – 29 November 2013; commonly known as Baku Mahadeva) was a leading Sri Lankan Tamil civil servant.

== Early life and family ==
Mahadeva was born on 29 October 1921. He was the son of Arunachalam Mahadeva and Sivahamy Ammal. He was educated at Royal College, Colombo where he was classmates of C. A. Coorey. After school he obtained BA and MA degrees in mathematics from the University of London.

Mahadeva married Sundari, daughter of Sega Theagarajah. They had two children, Kumar Mahadeva and Isvari.

== Career ==
Mahadeva lectured in mathematics at the University of Ceylon, Colombo before joining the Ceylon Civil Service in January 1945. During his civil service career he held numerous senior positions. He was Assistant Secretary to the Minister of Defence in 1949 and Assistant Secretary to the Minister of Lands in 1952. He became Permanent Secretary at the Ministry of Agriculture and Food in 1958. He also served as Secretary to the Ministry of Public Administration and Home Affairs.

== Later life ==
After retirement Mahadeva served as Secretary to the Treasury. He then served with the United Nations in Malaysia.

Mahadeva was chairman of the National Development Bank and DFCC Bank and a director of People's Bank. He was chairman of Lanka Tiles Ltd and Lanka Wall Tiles Ltd and director of several private companies. He was chairman of the Presidential Privatisation Commission and a member of the Securities and Exchange Commission.

Mahadeva was chairman of the boards of trustees for Sri Ponnambalavaneeswara Temple and Sri Arunachaleswara Temple. He was awarded the Deshamanya title, the second highest Sri Lankan national honour, in 1990.

Mahadeva died on 29 November 2013.
