= Senkadagala Electoral District =

Electoral district of Sri Lanka

Senkadagala electoral district was an electoral district of Sri Lanka between March 1960 and February 1989. The district was named after the town of Senkadagala in Kandy District, Central Province. The 1978 Constitution of Sri Lanka introduced the proportional representation electoral system for electing members of Parliament. The existing 160 mainly single-member electoral districts were replaced with 22 multi-member electoral districts. Senkadagala electoral district was replaced by the Kandy multi-member electoral district at the 1989 general elections.

== Members of Parliament ==
Key

Independent SLFP UNP

Election	Member	Party	Term
1960 (March)	Noel Wimalasena	UNP	
1960 (July)	Shelton Ranaraja	SLFP	
1965	Noel Wimalasena	UNP	
1970	Noel Wimalasena	UNP	
1977	Shelton Ranaraja	UNP	

== Elections ==
=== 1960 (March) Parliamentary General Election ===
Results of the 4th parliamentary election held on 19 March 1960:

Candidate	Party	Symbol	Votes	%
Noel Wimalasena	United National Party	Elephant	5,831	48.25
Piyasena Tennakoon		Cartwheel	4,674	38.68
D. W. de S. Gamage	Sri Lanka Freedom Party	Hand	1,408	11.65
Sirisena Petiyagoda		Ladder	118	0.98
Valid Votes			12,031	99.55
Rejected Votes			54	0.45
Total Polled			12,085	
Registered Electors			16,550	
Turnout				73.02

=== 1960 (July) Parliamentary General Election ===
Candidate	Party	Symbol	Votes	%
Shelton Ranaraja	Sri Lanka Freedom Party	Hand	6,100	50.1
Noel Wimalasena	United National Party	Elephant	6,075	49.9
Valid Votes			12,175	99.53
Rejected Votes			58	0.47
Total Polled			12,233	
Registered Electors			16,550	
Turnout				73.9

=== 1965 Parliamentary General Election ===
Candidate	Party	Symbol	Votes	%
Noel Wimalasena	United National Party	Elephant	10,191	
Piyasena Tennakoon	Sri Lanka Freedom Party	Hand	6,821	
S. W. Y. B. N. B. Beddewala		Aeroplane	145	
Valid Votes				100.00
Rejected Votes				
Total Polled				
Registered Electors				
Turnout				

=== 1970 Parliamentary General Election ===
Candidate	Party	Symbol	Votes	%
Noel Wimalasena	United National Party	Elephant	10,917	50.6
Anuruddha Ratwatte	Sri Lanka Freedom Party	Hand	10,592	48.93
M. B. C. E. Sriwardhana	Janatha Vimukthi Peramuna	Bell	68	0.31
Valid Votes			21,577	99.69
Rejected Votes			67	0.31
Total Polled			21,644	
Registered Electors			25,780	
Turnout				83.96

=== 1977 Parliamentary General Election ===
Candidate	Party	Symbol	Votes	%
Shelton Ranaraja	United National Party	Elephant	17,972	57.53
Anuruddha Ratwatte	Sri Lanka Freedom Party	Hand	12,381	39.63
Wijayadasa Wickremaratne	Lanka Sama Samaja Party	Key	885	2.83
Valid Votes			31,238	99.74
Rejected Votes			81	0.26
Total Polled			31,319	
Registered Electors			36,735	
Turnout				85.26
