= Orion City =

Coordinates: 6.9412°N 79.8801°E

- Industry: Information technology business park
- Founded: 2009; 17 years ago
- Founder: Jeevan Gnanam
- Headquarters: 752, Dr. Danister De Silva Mawatha, Colombo, Sri Lanka
- Key people: Jeevan Gnanam (CEO)
- Website: www.orioncity.lk

Orion City is an information technology (IT) and business park located in Colombo, Sri Lanka. Established in 2009, it is regarded as Sri Lanka's first privately developed IT park and serves as a campus for information technology, business process management (BPM), and multinational corporations. The development occupies approximately 16 acres (6.5 ha) and comprises around one million square feet of commercial space.

The campus has been cited as an important contributor to the growth of Sri Lanka's information technology and business process outsourcing (IT/BPM) sector by providing purpose-built infrastructure for domestic and multinational technology companies.

== History ==
Orion City was launched in 2009 by Orion Development (Pvt.) Ltd., a member of the St. Anthony's Group of Companies, as Sri Lanka's first privately developed information technology (IT) business park. Developed on a 13-acre (5.3 ha) site in Colombo, the project was conceived to provide purpose-built office infrastructure for the country's emerging information technology and business process management (IT/BPM) industries as part of the group's diversification into the technology sector, with plans for phased expansion into a large-scale technology campus.

During its initial development, Orion City entered into an agreement with Suntel Ltd to provide advanced telecommunications and data communication infrastructure for the technology park, supporting software companies, business process outsourcing (BPO) firms and other technology enterprises. Contemporary reports described the project as helping address the shortage of modern office facilities for Sri Lanka's rapidly expanding technology sector.

By early 2018, Orion City accommodated 32 local and international companies, including Virtusa, Pearson and WNS Global Services, employing around 6,000 people. The Orion Towers expansion was expected to add approximately one million square feet (93,000 m^{2}) of office space to the campus.

By the mid-2020s, Orion City had expanded to approximately one million square feet (93,000 m^{2}) of developed space, accommodating more than 80 local and international companies and a workforce exceeding 10,000 professionals.

== Development ==
Orion City was developed as an integrated technology business campus rather than a conventional office complex. The master plan comprises multiple phases of development, including office towers, flexible workspaces, meeting and conference facilities, a hotel, food courts, and data centre infrastructure.

In November 2017, Orion Development opened bookings for the Orion City Towers, a three-tower commercial office development forming part of the master plan. Designed by DP Architects of Singapore with interior concepts by Balmond Studio, the first phase was planned to provide approximately 250,000 square feet (23,000 m^{2}) of rentable office space. The development incorporated flexible office layouts, business support facilities, and environmentally sustainable features, including LEED certification and energy-efficient building systems.

In March 2018, Dialog Broadband Networks, a wholly owned subsidiary of Dialog Axiata, and St. Anthony's Property Developers (Pvt.) Ltd. formed a joint venture to establish Digital Realty (Pvt.) Ltd. for the development and operation of a high-density data centre at Orion City. Dialog invested Rs. 262.5 million for a 35% equity stake in the venture, while St. Anthony's Property Developers held the remaining 65%. At the time, Orion City accommodated 32 local and international companies employing around 6,000 people, while the Orion Towers expansion was expected to add approximately one million square feet (93,000 m^{2}) of office space to the campus.

The first phase, Orion Tower, officially opened in July 2019. The 20-storey office tower comprises approximately 500,000 square feet (46,000 m^{2}) of commercial space and includes office accommodation, retail facilities, food courts, co-working space, a business hotel, meeting facilities and rooftop amenities.

In November 2021, the Orion Stellar data centre officially commenced operations. Described as Sri Lanka's first carrier-neutral, high-density commercial data centre, the facility was built to TIA-942 Rated 3 standards with capacity for more than 200 server racks and 1.5 MW of power, providing colocation, cloud infrastructure, disaster recovery and managed services for enterprise customers.

In April 2024, Orion City announced a collaboration with Hatch, a Sri Lankan startup incubator, to provide shared access to meeting rooms, event spaces and collaborative workspaces through a digital platform connecting Hatch Works in Colombo 1, Orion Nest in Colombo 9 and Orion City's planned expansion in Colombo 3.

In 2025, Orion City expanded beyond its original Colombo 9 campus with the opening of "OC by Orion City", a flexible office and co-working facility on Galle Road in Colombo 3. The facility provides private offices, meeting rooms, collaborative workspaces and rooftop event space, while incorporating sustainability features including solar power generation, rainwater harvesting and drip irrigation systems. The company also announced plans for further expansion into Kandy.

== Facilities ==
Orion City is a mixed-use technology campus comprising purpose-built office space together with business support infrastructure. Facilities include enterprise office space, co-working areas, meeting and conference facilities, the Orion Stellar Data Centre, retail outlets, food courts, parking, childcare services, fitness facilities, electric vehicle charging infrastructure, fibre-optic connectivity, an on-site electrical substation, and backup power generation.

As part of its campus amenities and innovation ecosystem, Orion City has established collaborative facilities in partnership with educational and international organisations. In 2016, it partnered with the British Council and The Coffee Bean & Tea Leaf to establish an integrated library and café combining a British Council library, café, meeting rooms and collaborative spaces. The facility was described as Sri Lanka's first open-plan library and café designed to promote learning, creativity and knowledge sharing among technology professionals and the wider public.

In 2017, Orion City partnered with Singapore Management University to establish the Business Innovation Through Future Technology (BIFT) Centre, an initiative promoting digital innovation, entrepreneurship and collaboration between industry and academia through research, training and business incubation.

In 2019, the development added Hotel Elyon Colombo (now Orion City Hotel), a business hotel designed primarily to serve corporate travellers, multinational companies and visitors to the technology park.

== Tenants ==
Orion City is occupied by a mixture of multinational corporations and Sri Lankan technology companies operating in software development, business process management (BPM), logistics and professional services. Notable tenants have included Virtusa, IFS, WNS Global Services, Michelin, Gallagher, Atlas Axillia, BASF, Omni Logistics and Infomate, the business process management subsidiary of John Keells Holdings.

== Sustainability ==
Orion City has incorporated environmental sustainability initiatives into its infrastructure. Orion Tower Phase I received Leadership in Energy and Environmental Design (LEED) Gold certification, while the Anton Building received LEED Silver certification.

In 2024, Orion City commissioned a 700-kilowatt solar power system, described as the first installation of its kind within a Sri Lankan IT park. The development also incorporates rainwater harvesting, waste management systems, electric vehicle charging facilities and other ESG initiatives.

== Role in Sri Lanka's IT industry ==
Orion City has been identified as one of Sri Lanka's principal technology business parks, providing purpose-built infrastructure for the country's expanding information technology and business process management (IT/BPM) industries. Industry publications have described Orion City as contributing to Colombo's emergence as a regional technology outsourcing destination by attracting multinational technology companies and supporting domestic firms.

The campus supports thousands of technology professionals and hosts companies engaged in software development, business process outsourcing (BPO), financial technology, logistics, and engineering services.

In 2023, Infomate, the business process management subsidiary of John Keells Holdings, expanded its operations at Orion City, citing the campus's infrastructure and uninterrupted power supply as factors supporting its workforce growth.
