= Kirthi =

Wikimedia disambiguation page

Kirthi may refer to:

- Kirthi Jayakumar (born 1987) Indian artist
- Kirthi Tennakone Sri Lankan scientist

== See also ==
- Kirti (disambiguation)
