= Sopan Baug =

Neighbourhood in Pune, Maharashtra, India

Sopan Baug is an area in Pune, Maharashtra, western India. It is situated around a fruit orchard of the same name. It is accessible by the BT Kavade Road and the Prince of Wales Drive. Situated nearby is Uday Baug.

Sopan Baug has a number of apartment complexes near it. The most well known of them are Florentine and Midtown Societies. A railway runs near Sopan Baug. Sopan Baug became one of the most sought after residential destination due to its close proximity to Koregaon Park. Some of the residential complexes of Sopanbaug have flats and apartments. Schools nearby include Army Public School, Bishops Camp, St. Vincents.

Notable residents have included the cardiologist Shirish Hiremath (1951–2026).
