= Nahammal Kasipillai =

Sri Lankan educator

Nahammal Kasipillai (15 January, 1915 - 8 December, 2005) was a Sri Lankan educator.

== Biography ==
Kasipillai attended Vembadi Girls' High School in Jaffna, and moved to Madras, India to study at the Women's Christian College. She graduated in 1936, and returned to Sri Lanka to study education at the University of Ceylon. In 1937, she was appointed principal of Hindu Ladies' College, Wellawatte (then known as Saiva Mangaiyar Kalgam). Kasipillai held this position until her retirement in 1969.

Kasipillai was active in several organisations centred on education and women's development. She was the president of the Colombo Teachers' Association in 1965, and a life member of the Hindu Women's Society and the Colombo Hindu Young Women's Association.

In 1993, Kasipillai received the national honour, Deshabandu.
