= Nihal Jinasena =

Sri Lankan industrialist and sportsman (1940-2015)

- Deshamanya Dr.Tissaweera Nihal Jinasena
- Born: 13 July 1940 (age 86); Moratuwa, Sri Lanka
- Died: 2 February 2015 (aged 74)
- Occupations: Industrialist, sportsman
- Spouse: Sheryll Jinasena
- Children: Lalin Michael Jinasena
- Website: L-M-J Group

Deshamanya Dr. Tissaweera Nihal Jinasena (13 July 1940 – 2 February 2015) was a Sri Lankan industrialist and sportsman. He was the chairman of Lalin Michael Jinasena & Co. and the former chairman of Loadstar(PVT) Limited, which was the largest export company in Sri Lanka.

== Early life and family ==
Born to T. S. Jinasena and his wife Lily in Moratuwa, Sri Lanka, Nihal Jinasena was the oldest in the family with three brothers and educated at St. Thomas College, Mount Lavinia. He went on to study at Loughborough University in the UK, gaining a BE in Mechanical Engineering in 1962. There he was President of the Student Union, a rare distinction for any student and the first Sri Lankan to be elected. In 2000, he received an Honorary Doctorate in Technology from Loughbourg University.

He is married to Sheryll Jinasena and has one son, Lalin Michael. His main residence is in Ekala, Sri Lanka.

== Career ==
After graduation, Nihal Jinasena took up a position at Girling Ltd as a Senior Development Engineer. In 1965, he returned to Sri Lanka to revive the family engineering company, C Jinasena & Co. In the same year, his father T.S. Jinasena, turned his company over to his four sons and Dr. Nihal became managing director, a position he held until the group's division in 2009. The company was driven by Dr. Nihal and his three brothers – like the grandfather and the father before them – on the lines of profits and service to humanity. "Our single principle is, every employee must feel that he is a part owner of the company, his ideas of how it should be run are taken into account and he shares in the rewards and profits the company earns", says Dr. Nihal about his Company.

== History of Jinasena Group of Companies ==
C Jinasena & Co. was founded in 1905 by Dr. Nihal's grandfather, C. Jinasena. It started as a workshop to repair bicycles and sewing machines and gradually grew into a machinery repair workshop that serviced the rubber, coconut and graphite industries. It was one of the few local engineering businesses competing with the British who dominated the manufacturing industry in Ceylon and a step in the direction of economic independence.

In 1952, under the management of Dr. Nihal's father T.S. Jinasena, the Jinasena Group was diversified into production of water pumps. For many years, the Jinasena family was synonymous with the Centric Water Pumps, the first ever in the country and soon the most popular in the market. In 1965, the four Jinasena brothers were inducted into the business as partners and in 1967 the company was incorporated as Jinasena Limited and Jinasena Castings Limited.

The 1970s saw the start of substantial growth with the formation of companies in the areas of electrical motor manufacturing, agricultural machinery, hotels, clothing, seafood export, computer software and solid rubber tyres, and in 2000 Jinasena consists of 17 companies and is one of the largest conglomerates in Sri Lanka.

== LMJ Group ==
In 2009, the Jinasena Group decided to divide its assets between the four Jinasena brothers. The companies, which came to Dr. Nihal in this division, are now a part of the LMJ group, with his son Lalin Michael Jinasena as CEO and himself as chairman. The LMJ Group comprises companies, which were built up by Dr. Nihal under the Jinasena Company as well as companies created by Lalin. The Group is involved and pioneering in Hospitality and Food & Beverage, manufacturing and export, trading, web development, and includes a subsidiary interior decor company and owns among others the multi awarded boutique hotel Casa Colombo.

== Honorary Positions ==
- Chairman of Lalin Michael Jinasena & Co
- Chairman of Loadstar (Pvt.) Ltd.
- Chairman of Handrookanda (Pvt.) Ltd.
- Chairman of Jinasena New Technology Holdings
- Chairman of Royal Lotus Hotel (Pvt.) Ltd
- Chairman of Almeco (Pvt.) Ltd
- Chairman of Ambiaz (Pvt.) Ltd
- Chairman of Jinasena Industrial Park (Pvt.) Ltd.
- Chairman of Gonuts with Donuts (Pvt.) Ltd
- Chairman of Casa Colombo (Pvt.) Ltd
- Chairman of Jinasena Engineering Technologies (Pvt.) Ltd.
- Chairman of Tropical Fusion (Pvt.) Ltd
- Chairman of Jinasena Exports (Pvt.) Ltd.
- Chairman of Mahout Adventures (Pvt.) Ltd
- Chairman of Jinasena Management Services (Pvt.) Ltd
- Chairman of the Children Committee of Ceylon, Children's Convalescent Home
- Member of the National Research Council
- Member of the Institution of Engineers Sri Lanka
- Member of the Institution of Engineers, UK
- Former member of the Securities and Exchange Commission Sri Lanka
- Former member of the Insurance Board of Sri Lanka
- Former chairman of DFCC Bank and DFCC Vardhana Bank
- Dr. Nihal was honoured with the Sri Lankan title of Deshamanya

== Motor Sport ==
A keen sportsman and sharing the passion of his father as a champion motor racing driver, Dr. Nihal was the leading racing driver in the 70s in Sri Lanka. The Jinasena family has been actively involved in the Ceylon Motor Sports Club, with his father being a founder member and former president of the club.
