= H. K. Dharmadasa =

Sri Lankan businessperson (1920–2011)

H. K. Dharmadasa (Nawaloka Mudalali) දේශමාන්‍ය එච්. කේ. ධර්මදාස
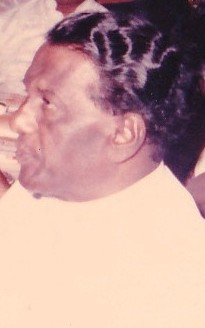
- Born: Hewa Komanage Dharmadasa; 17 June 1920; Sulthanagoda, Matara, Sri Lanka
- Died: 10 August 2011 (aged 91); Colombo, Sri Lanka
- Known for: Founder of Nawaloka Hospital and Nawaloka Group
- Spouse: Meelin Dharmadasa
- Children: Malini, Rukmani, Pushpa, Jayantha, Priyani and Upali

Deshamanya Hewa Komanage Dharmadasa (17 June 1920 – 10 August 2011), known as Navaloka Mudalali, was a business magnate, philanthropist and chairman of the Navaloka Group of companies. It is one of the leading private sector organizations in Sri Lanka. He was a philanthropist and the Nawaloka Hospital was his brainchild in the health sector.

== See also ==
- Deshamanya
