= Keerti Shah =

Indian virologist (1928–2019)

- Born: Keerti Vandravan Shah; November 2, 1928; Ranpur, Gujarat, India
- Died: July 21, 2019 (aged 90); Ponce Inlet, Florida, US
- Education: B. J. Medical College; Johns Hopkins University
- Known for: Research linking human papillomavirus to cervical cancer
- Spouse: Farida Maniar
- Children: 3
- Scientific career
- Fields: Virology
- Institutions: Johns Hopkins Bloomberg School of Public Health

Keerti Vandravan Shah (November 2, 1928 – July 21, 2019) was an Indian virologist known for his research confirming that the human papillomavirus causes cervical cancer. This research led to the development of the HPV vaccine. From 1962 until his retirement in 2013, he was on the faculty of the Bloomberg School of Public Health at Johns Hopkins University. In 2006, the Department of Molecular Microbiology and Immunology in the Bloomberg School of Public Health honored Shah by proclaiming October 7 to be Keerti Shah Day.
