= Krti =

Krti or KRTI may refer to:

- Kriti (music), or kṛti, a concept in Indian classical music
- Krti, Croatia, a settlement in Buzet, Croatia
- KRTI, an American radio station

== See also ==
- Kriti (disambiguation)
- Kiriti (disambiguation)
