= G. W. Rajapaksha =

Brevet Colonel Deshabandu George Wilfred Rajapakse, ED (1917-1999) was a Sri Lankan educationist. He was the Commanding Officer, Ceylon Cadet Battalion and Principal of Ananda College.

Born in Kelaniya, Rajapakse received is secondary education at Ananda College, becoming head prefect and captained the college cadet contingent. After completing his schooling, he joined the academic staff of the school as a teacher, serving as hostel supervisor, sports teacher and vice principal. He left Ananda to serve as principle of Isipathana Vidyalaya, Colombo. He served as principle of Ananda College from 1969 to 1981, under the mentorship of P. de S. Kularatne, succeeding Lieutenant Colonel E. A. Perusinghe.

Commissioned as a Second Lieutenant in the cadet battalion of the Ceylon Defence Force, Rajapakse served as the teacher in charge of cadets in Ananda College. Lieutenant Rajapakse led Ananda College cadet platoon to win the Herman Loos Trophy in 1949 with his platoon sergeant Duleep Wickramanayake. As volunteer officer in the cadet battalion, he was awarded the Efficiency Decoration in 1964. Lieutenant Colonel Rajapakse served as the commanding officer of the Ceylon Cadet Battalion from 1969 to 1973, succeeding Lieutenant Colonel E. A. Perusinghe and was breveted as a Colonel in 1972.

He was married to Kamala Rajapaksha, the principal of Musaeus College.

President Premadasa conferred the national honor of Deshabandu on Rajapakse in 1992.
