= Sharad Moreshwar Hardikar =

Indian orthopedic surgeon and hospital founder

- Born: 22 June 1932 (age 93); Phaltan, Satara District, Maharashtra, India
- Occupation: Orthopedic surgeon
- Employer: Hardikar Hospital
- Spouse: Leela Sharad Karve
- Children: 1
- Parent(s): Moreshwar; Malati
- Awards: Padma Shri (2004)

Sharad Moreshwar Hardikar (born 22 June 1932) is an Indian orthopedic surgeon and the founder of Hardikar Hospital, Pune. He also heads the hospital's charitable trust, the Sushrut Medical Care and Research Society. Hardikar, an honorary fellow of the British Orthopaedic Association, was awarded the fourth highest civilian honour of the Padma Shri, in 2014, by the Government of India.

== Biography ==
Hardikar was born on 22 June 1932 at Phaltan, in Satara District in the western Indian state of Maharashtra, to Malati and Moreshwar Hardikar. He did his graduate studies in medicine (MBBS) at B. J. Medical College (BJMC) Pune and secured the fellowship of the Royal College of Surgeons of Edinburgh (FRCS) in 1964. In 1965 he moved to Uganda to work at the Makerere University and New Mulago Hospital in Kampala as a consultant surgeon, and was in charge of the polio clinic there.

Returning to India in 1967, he joined BJMC, where he taught and practiced for 25 years till his superannuation in 1992, when he was made the emeritus professor of the institution. In 1970, while working at BJMC, he founded the Hardikar Hospital, a 10-bed facility dedicated to orthopedics, and has served as its director since then. Over the years, the facility has grown into a multi-specialty hospital, housing 60 in-patients and a charitable trust under the name Sushrut Medical Care and Research Society, engaged in disbursement of medical services to the poor sections of the society, which Hardikar also heads. Under the aegis of the society, Hardikar has organised 75 free medical camps where 1,500 children have been provided with free orthopedic surgeries, and has assisted in the rehabilitation of spastic children.

Hardikar has published several monographs on diseases such as arthritis, poliomyelitis, back pain, knee and shoulder pain, cerebral palsy, and osteoporosis, and is credited with medical innovations such as the Wagner External Fixator and implants for fixation of fractured neck humerus, fractured lower end of radius, and removal of broken screw.

== Affiliations ==
He was the president of the Maharashtra Orthopedic Association from 2001 to 2003 and vice president of the Association of Spine Surgeons of India (ASSI) from 1998 to 1999. He is a patron and the incumbent president of the Pune chapter of ASSI.

== Honours and awards ==
He is an honorary fellow of the British Orthopaedic Association and the Government of India awarded him with the civilian honour of Padma Shri in 2004.

== Personal ==
Hardikar married Leela Sharad Karve in 1957. They have one son and reside in Pune.
