= J. F. A. Soza =

Joseph Francis Anthony Soza

Puisne Justice of the Supreme Court of Sri Lanka
- In office 26 January 1982 – 3 February 1984

Personal details
- Born: 4 February 1919 Negombo, Sri Lanka
- Died: 8 April 2013 (aged 94) Colombo, Sri Lanka

Joseph Francis Anthony Soza (1919 – 8 April 2013) was a former judge of the Supreme Court of Sri Lanka. He has been described as "an outstandingly independent judge" who "turned out to be a fearless and vocal defender of the rights of victimized people."

== Education ==
Soza was educated at Maris Stella College, Negombo. He taught English and Pure Mathematics at St. Joseph's College, Bandarawela, Ceylon Technical College and Ananda College, Colombo. After graduating in arts and law from the University of London, he enrolled as an advocate after completing his studies at the Sri Lanka Law College, where he was also president of the law students' union.

== Judicial career ==
Following a brief stint as a lawyer, Soza commenced his distinguished judicial career as a magistrate in Balapitiya. After serving the original courts as magistrate, district judge and high-court judge he was appointed a judge of the Court of Appeal in 1978. In January 1982, President J. R. Jayawardene appointed him as judge of the Supreme Court. He retired from judicial service in February 1984.

== Other activities ==
Soza was the editor-in-chief of the Sri Lanka Law Reports for more than 25 years (1979-2005). As the founding director of the Sri Lanka Judges' Institute, he played a major role in the training of judicial officers in the country. As the first chairman of the Human Rights Task Force (now known as the Human Rights Commission) during the post-insurgency period 1991-1994, he was responsible for investigating cases of human rights abuse by state authorities. Among his celebrated disclosures was the Embilipitiya Students' Disappearance case. According to a report by the Brookings Institution, "the HRTF was set up to oversee the conditions of those detained under the country’s national security laws: the Prevention of Terrorism Act (PTA) and the Emergency Regulations introduced by the President under the Public Security Ordinance. Although its legal foundations were weak, the HRTF performed an important function due mainly to its dynamic chair, a former Supreme Court judge, who used his stature as a former judicial officer to gain access to detention centers and to engage with military commanders on a regular basis."

He was chairman of the Sri Lanka Foundation and a member of several presidential commissions of inquiry. In 1992, President Premadasa conferred on him the national honour Deshabandu in recognition of his distinguished service to the country.

== Landmark judgments ==
As a high-court judge of Colombo and chairman of the trial-at-bar of TULF Leader Appapillai Amirthalingam, on 10 September 1976, Soza created "an explosion of jubilation" by holding invalid the emergency regulations under which the case was filed.

In the Supreme Court he was widely known for his illuminating judgments, especially concerning fundamental rights. He wrote the landmark opinion in the Vivienne Goonewardena assault case, in which it was declared that the police infringed the petitioner's freedom of expression. Incensed by the judgment, pro-police demonstrators stoned the residences of Soza and the other two judges who had tried the case.

== See also ==
- Supreme Court of Sri Lanka
