= Tokyo Cement =

Sri Lankan cement manufacturing company

Tokyo Cement Company (Lanka) PLC
- Logo of Tokyo Cement

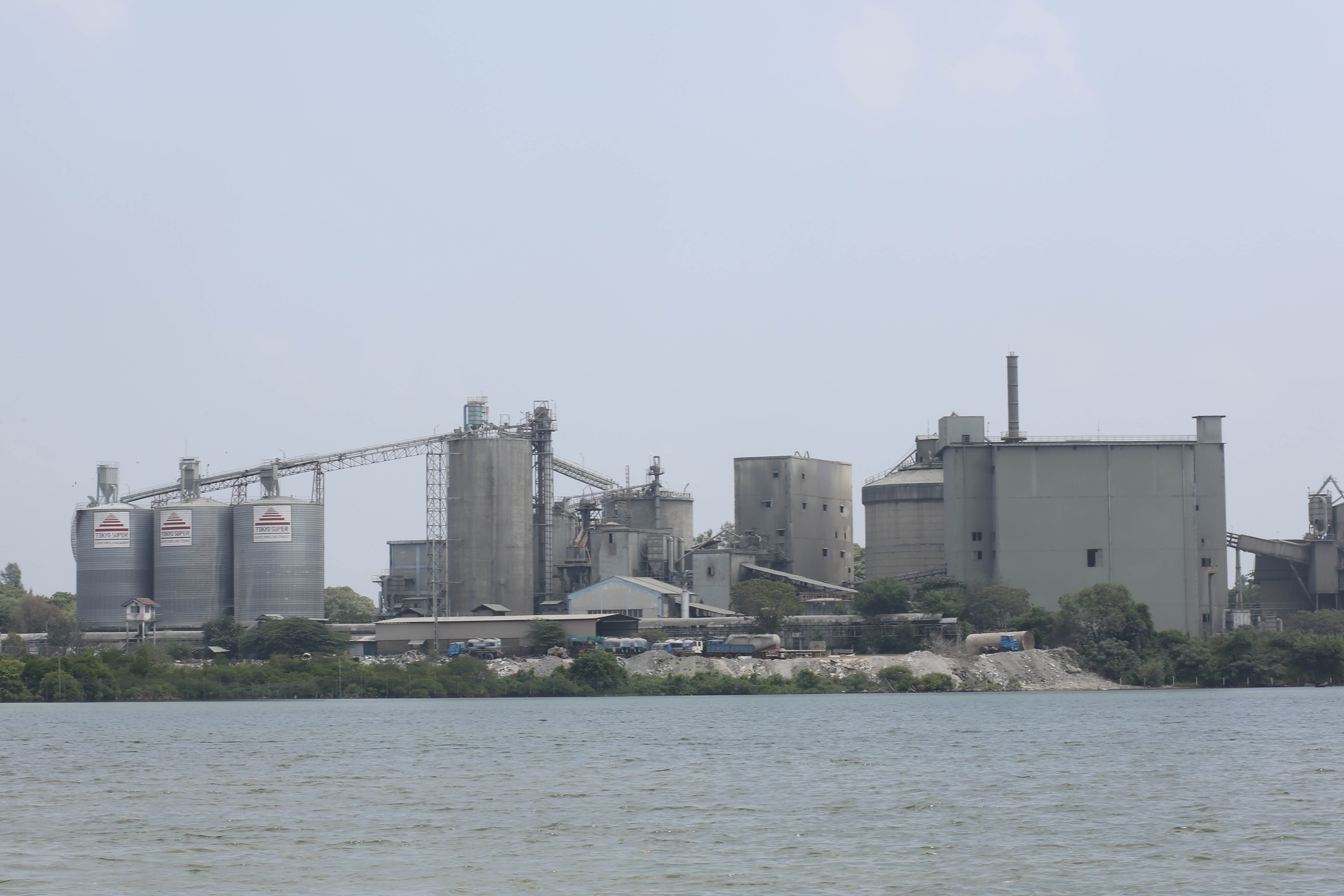
- Tokyo Cement factory in Trincomalee
- Company type: Public
- Traded as: CSE: TKYO.N0000
- ISIN: LK0165N00007
- Industry: Materials
- Founded: 1982; 44 years ago
- Founder: A. Y. S. Gnanam
- Headquarters: Colombo, Sri Lanka
- Key people: Harsha Cabral (Chairman); S. R. Gnanam (Managing Director)
- Revenue: ▲LKR52,478 million (2022)
- Operating income: ▼LKR5,232 million (2022)
- Net income: ▼LKR(358) million (2022)
- Total assets: ▲LKR47,210 million (2022)
- Total equity: ▼LKR20,920 million (2022)
- Owner: St. Anthony's Consolidated (Pvt) Ltd (27.5%); South Asian Investment (Pvt) Ltd (20.1%); UBE Singapore Holdings Pte. Ltd (10.0%)
- Number of employees: 1,206 (2022)
- Website: tokyocement.com

Tokyo Cement Company (Lanka) PLC is a Sri Lankan cement manufacturing company headquartered in Colombo. The company is engaged in manufacturing Portland cement, Pozzolana cement, tile adhesives and other cement products. Sri Lankan entrepreneur, A. Y. S. Gnanam founded the company in 1982. Tokyo Cement Company is a quoted company on the Colombo Stock Exchange since 1984. The company was one of the components of the S&P Sri Lanka 20 Index until June 2022. The company is ranked 29th amongst the LMD 100, an annual list of top 100 listed companies in Sri Lanka by revenue for the 2020/21 period.

== History ==
The company was founded in 1982 as a joint venture between Mitsui Mining Company and St. Anthony's Consolidated under the leadership of A. Y. S. Gnanam, founder of the St. Anthony's Group. In 1983, the construction of the manufacturing plant began in Trincomalee and the company was listed on the Colombo Stock Exchange in 1984. The Trincomalee cement factory, the second largest cement plant in the country at the time, was bombed in May 1986 by the Eelam Revolutionary Organisation of Students (EROS) which caused to halt the production and damage worth several million rupees. The production commenced in 1988. Fuji Cement Company (Lanka) a fully owned subsidiary of the company commenced operations in 1998. In 2014, the company partnered with the Foundation of Goodness to sponsor a coaching programme for school cricketers. The company has continued its partnership with the Foundation since then. In 2015, Fuji Cement Company (Lanka) merged back with the Tokyo Cement Company. In 2020, the company entered into an agreement with the Board of Investment of Sri Lanka for an expansion plan worth US$12 million.

== Operations ==
In 2021, the company recommended to the government of Sri Lanka to extend the restriction imposed on importing cement in light of the depreciation of the Sri Lanka rupee. Managing Director S. R. Gnanam stated that the local manufacturers could meet 90% of the country's demand for cement. The revival of the construction sector in the post-pandemic times is expected to increase the revenue of the Tokyo Cement by 12% in 2022.

== See also ==
- List of companies listed on the Colombo Stock Exchange
