= C. G. Uragoda =

American Sri Lankan physician

Christopher Gunapala Uragoda
- Occupation: Physician
- Known for: Medical research in occupational lung disease
- Title: Deshabandu

Christopher Gunapala Uragoda is a Sri Lankan physician, author, folklorist, historian and conservationist.

== Education ==
Uragoda was educated at Richmond College (Sri Lanka), Mahinda College, Ananda College and Faculty of Medicine, University of Colombo qualifying Bachelor of Medicine, Bachelor of Surgery and Doctor of Medicine. He trained in the UK becoming a Fellow of the Royal College of Physicians and working as a Consultant in Respiratory Medicine. In Sri Lanka he was Physician-in-Charge, Central Chest Clinic, Colombo and Physician at Chest Hospital, Welisera. He is a Member of the Faculty of Occupational Medicine of the RCP London, and was a member of the WHO Expert Panel on Tuberculosis.

== Professional career ==
Uragoda is known for his work in Occupational Lung disease caused by dust of chilli, tea, kapok, cinnamon, coir, ilmenite, and activated carbon. He is best known for his paper showing for the first time that skipjack was rich in histamine and that isoniazid prevents its destruction, thus increasing skipjack poisoning in patients being treated for tuberculosis.

In addition to books on medicine, he wrote on Wildlife Conservation in Sri Lanka. He was the Joint Editor of the Ceylon Medical Journal (succeeded by Janaka de Silva but remaining an editor emeritus), the Journal of the Ceylon College of Physicians and Journal of the National Academy of Sciences. Uragoda co-edited the Sesquicentennial Commemorative Volume of the Royal Asiatic Society of Sri Lanka 1845– 1995. He also wrote Traditions of Sri Lanka, A Selection With a Scientific Background. which explores scientific explanations for Sri Lankan traditional beliefs and customs and a volume compiling works of authors from Sri Lanka between 1795 and 1948

== Honours and awards ==
Uragoda was the President of the Royal Asiatic Society of Sri Lanka (1987-1991), Sri Lanka Medical Association and Ceylon College of Physicians. Uragoda has received awards for research, which include the Guinness Award in 1980, Peter Pillai Award in 1981, President’s Award of the National Research Education and Science Authority in 1996, and the Sarvodaya Award in 1999. The Royal Asiatic Society Sri Lanka awarded him the Hilda Obeysekera Medal.

Uragoda was awarded the title Deshabandu by the Government of Sri Lanka. He is a Fellow of the American College of Chest Physicians, Fellow of the Faculty of Occupational Medicine of the Royal College of Physicians, London, Fellow of the Ceylon College of Physicians; Fellow of the National Academy of Sciences of Sri Lanka, and Honorary Fellow of the College of General Practitioners of Sri Lanka.
