= Bogoda Premaratne =

- Born: 15 March 1921; Ceylon
- Died: 26 December 2013 (aged 92)
- Occupation: Educator
- Known for: Improving education

Deshabandhu Bogoda Appuhamilage Premaratne (15 March 1921 – 26 December 2013) was a Sri Lankan youth educator who served in the Sri Lanka Department of Education in various capacities. Beginning as a teacher, he became the principal of secondary education schools and teacher training schools. He ended his civil service career as the Commissioner of Examinations, then served on the Fulbright Scholarships selection committee from 1976 to 1988. He was appointed chair of the Educational Reforms Committee of Sri Lanka in 1980, whose committee report was accepted and subsequently implemented. He wrote a number of books on Buddhism.

== Early life and education ==
Premaratne was born in Ceylon (Sri Lanka) on 15 March 1921 as the youngest child of seven in a Buddhist family, and his elementary school education was in a rural setting, in the local Sinhala school. He attended Ananda College, passed the London Matriculation Examination, and then entered Ananda's teacher training program in English. He was offered a position at the newly-founded Kegalu Vidyalaya, and while there passed the entrance exam for Government English Training College. He accepted a position at Lankadhara Ladies Training College, and obtained his bachelor's degree from Ceylon University College, affiliated with University of London.

== Career ==
After his bachelor's degree, Premaratne worked as a teacher and principal for a number of training colleges, as a school inspector, and finally received an appointment, in January 1954, at Hanwella Central College. He was offered a UNESCO scholarship and gained a master's degree in Education from New York's Columbia University. When he returned he became principal at Giragama Training School. He became the vice principal at Royal College in 1959. He served in this capacity until 1966, and was then appointed principal (succeeding Dudley de Silva—the first Buddhist principal of the college. He held this position until the end of 1971.

Premaratne was appointed Commissioner of Examinations in 1972, and managed a record turnaround for GCE exams through his organisational skills. He retired from government service in 1976.

== Post-retirement ==
After his retirement Premaratne served at the United States-Sri Lanka Foundation for Fulbright Scholarship selection from 1976 to 1988. He was appointed to chair the Educational Reforms Committee of Sri Lanka in 1980, which produced a report accepted and implemented by the government. He left the field in 1989, and was awarded the Deshabandu (National Honours of Sri Lanka, a civil honour awarded by the Government of Sri Lanka) that same year.

Following a presidential request, he served as the secretary of the Ministerial Committee for Education, Cultural and Social Services. In this capacity, he established a new ‘Research Unit for the Social Values’ at the National Institute of Education of Sri Lanka.

His wife, Seelawathie Weerasekara, had died in 1997; they had one daughter. He died on 26 December 2013 at the age of 92.

== Authorship and Buddhism ==
Premaratne was an active Buddhist, and a member of the All Ceylon Buddhist Congress, where he served as secretary for a subcommittee on social welfare. He authored a number of books on Buddhism, including Daham Esa (2000), some of which in English, including Dialogues on Dhamma (2004). His two-volume work Enlightenment is your Birthright (2007; vol. 1 devoted to theory, and vol. 2 to practice) was praised for its easily accessible first-person format.
