= A. Y. S. Gnanam =

Sri Lankan business tycoon

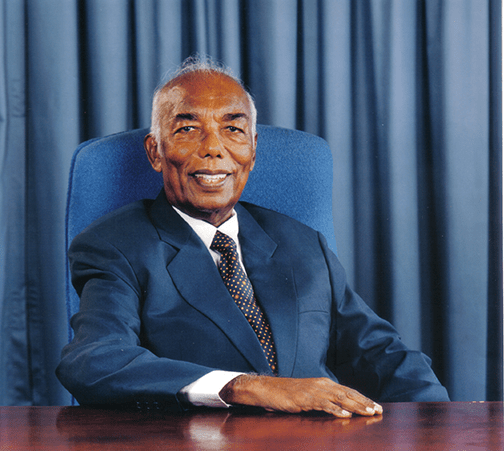
- Gnanam in 2000
- Born: 5 May 1922; Soukyapuram, Tirunelveli District, Madras Presidency, British India (present-day Tamil Nadu, India)
- Died: January 3, 2007 (aged 84); Mount Elizabeth Hospital, Singapore
- Occupations: Founder of St. Anthony's Group (Tokyo Cement Group, Sascon Knitting, St. Anthony’s Solar, Capital City Farms (Pvt) Limited and Rhino Roofing Products Limited); Founder of Ceylon Synthetic Textile Mills (Cyntex); Founder of Asian Cotton Mills; Chairperson of Express Newspapers (Ceylon) (Pvt) Limited. Chairperson of the Textile Manufacturing Association
- Spouse: Amy Gnanam
- Children: Rajaseelan Gnanam; Arul Gnanam; Jeyaseelan Gnanam
- Relatives: Jeevan Gnanam (grandson)
- Awards: Deshabandu (1986); Deshamanya (1994); Vishwa Prasadini (1996)

Arulanandam Yesuvadiyan Samuel Gnanam popularly known as A. Y. S. Gnanam(5 May 1922 - 3 January 2007) was a successful Sri Lankan business tycoon who founded St. Anthony's Group among others.

While young, Gnanam ventured into selling scrap iron on the road and eventually built the multi-billion-worth St. Anthony's Group.

== Early life ==
Gnanam was born in a small village Soukyapuram in Tirunelveli District, Madras Presidency, British India(in the present-day Tamil Nadu, India) in a Christian Nadar Family.

Gnanam went to a small school in Soukyapuram and did well in his studies. Since the school only had classes up to fourth grade, his mother sent him to a bigger school in a close-by town. He spent around one year at that school and returned back home due to accommodation issues.

He reached British Ceylon when he was 9 years old and joined his father and brother who were working in a small town Horana.

In the 1930s he attended a night school to learn English, whilst working with his brother in a shop in Kottawa, spending half of his monthly salary for his studies.

Gnanam on his brother’s request used to go thrice a week with goods loaded on a bullock cart, to farmers markets around villages in Kottawa. He was given two rupees as his wage for each market; he used the wage to buy produce from Chena farms along the way sold them at the market, and made a profit for himself.

== Career ==
Gnanam started to sell scrap iron on the road at a very tender age. After the Second World War there were many British vessels abandoned in Trincomalee. He saw this as an opportunity and started to buy scrap from these vessels and export them to India.

Gnanam then started a hardware business - St. Anthony's Hardware, where he sold scrap iron. The British were nice to him and gave him a good price; the business started to grow gradually and he started to import a number of other hardware-related products.

He went into trading reputed international brands Grundig and Sanyo in Sri Lanka in the 1950s.

Gnanam was invited by Sir Cyril De Zoysa to manage the ailing roofing manufacturing company Sri Lanka Asbestos Products (today known as Rhino Roofing). He turned to European manufacturers for equipment to upgrade the production line and to improve product quality. He eventually turned it into a successful venture.

In the late 1960s and early 1970s, the Government discouraged imported items coming into the market and promoted local industry and nationalisation. Gnanam saw another opportunity to begin manufacturing in Sri Lanka. He invested in equipment from international sources including from Germany that were known to have the best technology for manufacturing and produced high-quality nuts, bolts hinges and later PVC pipes, fittings and others.

During the same period, Gnanam realised that there was a big shortage of textiles in Sri Lanka. Therefore, he formed a joint venture with Mitsui Company and established the Ceylon Synthetic Textile Mills or Cyntex which used high-quality machineries from Switzerland and produced quality fabrics. This was the first public company that was initiated with Japanese collaboration in Sri Lanka and he was one of the first entrepreneurs to get World Bank funding.

Gnanam also initiated Asian Cotton Mills. During his time as Chairperson of the Textile Manufacturing Association, he campaigned for positive government policy changes in the local textile manufacturing industry.

He exported gems under the scheme known as CRA (Convertible Rupee Account) to earn foreign exchange to fund the import of consumer goods. He sometimes did not make much margin on the export of gems, instead making more margin on the consumer goods he imported.

When markets opened in the 1970s, he diversified into apparel, employing as many as 5,000 people in an enterprise to manufacture and export sweaters to the West.

Gnanam started Tokyo Cement as his second biggest public company in investment, expanding the manufacturing of building materials, anticipating a boom in the construction sector and this still lays the foundations for the building industry in Sri Lanka.

== Personal life ==
Gnanam married Amy Gnanam, and they had three sons: Rajaseelan, Arul, and Jeyaseelan, who are currently leading the companies founded by their father. His grandson, Jeevan Gnanam, is the co-founder of Orion City and Hatch.

== Charisma ==
When thugs robbed Gnanam’s house during the riots in 1983, they chased him out of his house. As he was just with a sarong and vest (his norm), the thugs sympathized and offered him a trouser and a shirt. Gnanam told them -

"Not to worry. I came like this from India and used to go from house to house buying old newspapers in this same attire. I am prepared to go with the same dress to the refugee camp."

Gnanam was extremely resilient, not succumbing to pressure from friends and family when several enterprises started by him were affected by the riots in 1983; he stood firm, rebuilt and restarted.

== Philanthropist ==
Gnanam was a silent philanthropist who assisted schools, hospitals, orphanages and the needy people.

== Awards and recognition ==
Gnanam was bestowed with three national titles, Deshabandu in 1986, Deshamanya in 1994 and Vishwa Prasadini in 1996.

== Legacy ==
=== Memorials ===
- The A.Y.S. Gnanam Village Heartbeat Empowerment Centre in Dambulla
- AYS GNANAM ELDERS’ HOME

== Bibliography ==
The author Jey Gnanam mentions, “I had the opportunity to visit my father’s place of birth Soukyapuram in 2011, and to see the little kudisai (hut) he spent his boyhood in. A feeling of awe and disbelief overwhelmed me at the sight of it.”

- Gnanam, Jey (2016), AYS Gnanam: My Father's Story, Perera - Hussein Publishing House (Sri Lanka), ISBN 978-9-5542-6960-6
