= Greek ship Kriti =

At least three ships of the Hellenic Navy have borne the name Kriti (Greek: Κρήτη) after the Greek island of Crete:

- Greek destroyer Kriti (1915) a Medea-class destroyer ordered by Greece but taken over by the Royal Navy before completion and renamed HMS Medea. Launched in 1915 and scrapped in 1921.
- Greek destroyer Kriti (L84) a Hunt-class destroyer launched in 1941 as HMS Hursley she was transferred to Greece in 1943 and renamed. She was returned to the Royal Navy in 1959 and scrapped in 1960.
- Greek landing ship Kriti (L171) a LST-542-class tank landing ship launched in 1945 as USS Page County transferred to Greece in 1971 and renamed.
