= B. J. Medical College =

Medical college in Pune, India

B. J. Government Medical College
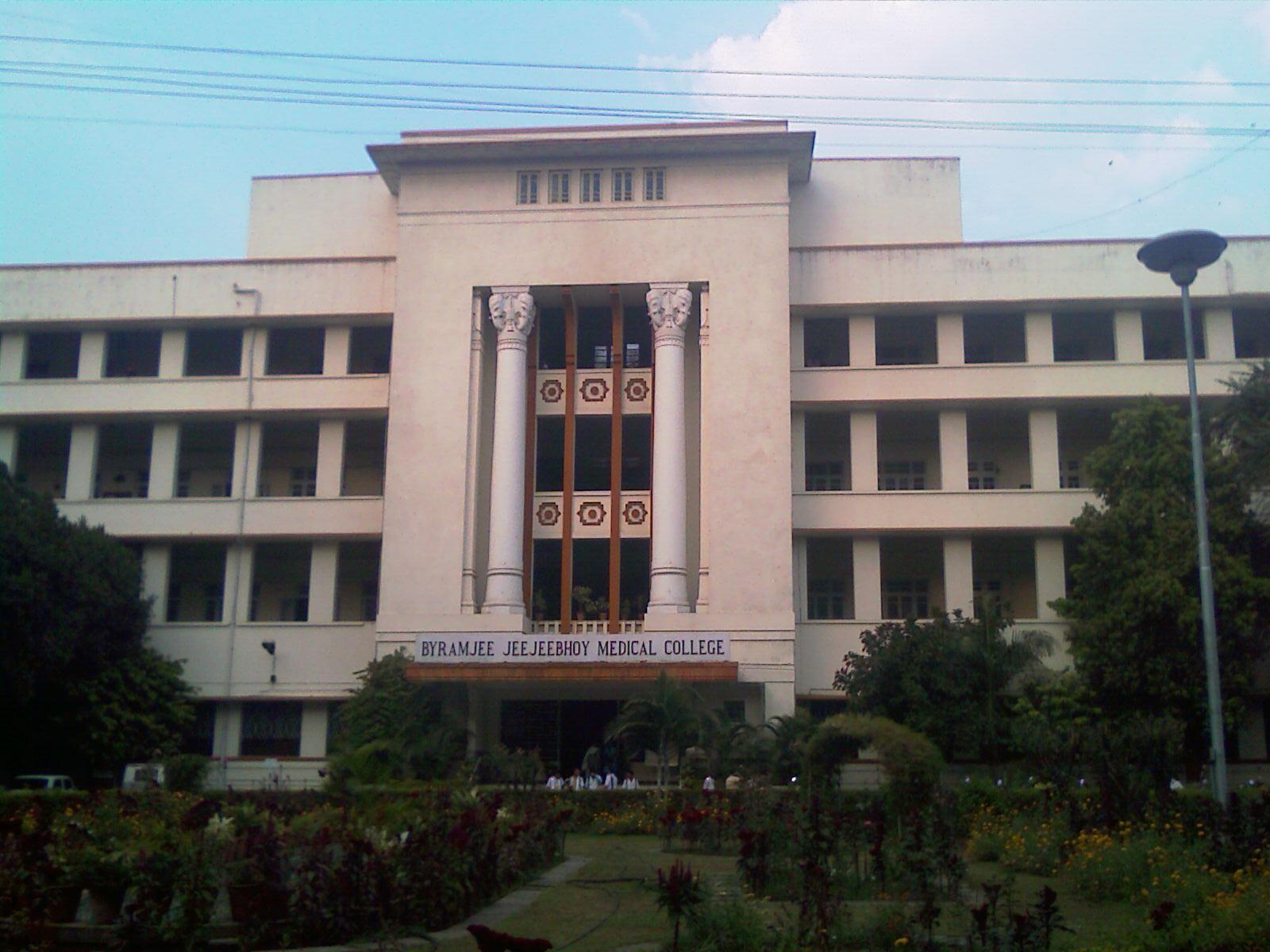
- Main building
- Motto: Service Duty Sacrifice
- Type: Public
- Established: June 23, 1946; 80 years ago
- Academic affiliations: Maharashtra University of Health Sciences
- Dean: Dr. Eknath Pawar
- Location: Pune, Maharashtra, India; 18°31′41″N 73°52′18″E
- Campus: Urban
- Website: www.bjgmcpune.org

B. J. Government Medical College (BJGMC) is a public medical college located in Pune, Maharashtra, India, founded by Byramjee Jeejeebhoy in 1878. The college, administered by the Government of Maharashtra, comprises pre-clinical, para-clinical, and clinical departments working alongside the Sassoon General Hospital.

== History ==
The B.J. Medical School was started in 1878 and was converted to full-fledged B.J. Medical College in 1946.

In 1924, Mahatma Gandhi was operated for acute appendicitis in this college.

== Location ==
B.J. Medical College and the allied Sassoon General Hospitals are near Pune Railway Station, in a busy area of the city. B.J. Medical College is a Two-minute walk from Pune central railway station.

== Hospital facilities ==
The hospital serves the needs of patients from urban and rural Pune. It is also a major referral centre for many of the surrounding districts. The hospital has facilities in medical specialities including a cardiac catheterization laboratory, CT imaging, upper gastrointestinal tract endoscopy, etc. Weekly clinics are run for medical and surgical superspecialties.

== Courses and admissions ==
=== Undergraduate ===
Every year, the college admits 250 students to the undergraduate (MBBS) course via National Eligibility cum Entrance Test (Undergraduate). 15% AIQ quota is there for All India students and 85% is the state quota. Earlier the method of selection was a combination of entrance examinations held at the state and national levels. The duration of training is four and a half years followed by compulsory internship for 1 year in urban and rural settings.

=== Post graduate ===
B.J. Medical College, Pune offers training in pre-clinical, para-clinical, and clinical disciplines. Previously granting degrees under the University of Pune, the institute is now affiliated to the Maharashtra University of Health Sciences (MUHS), Nasik. The duration of training is three years for degree (Doctor of Medicine(MD) or Master of Surgery(MS)) courses and two years for diploma courses. For undergraduate courses, the method of selection is by competitive entrance examinations held at the state and national levels. In addition, some seats are reserved for medical officers who have completed a pre-specified number of years of service in the rural areas of the state of Maharashtra.

=== Superspeciality ===
The superspeciality training course offered is MCh in Cardiovascular and Thoracic Surgery (CVTS), plastic surgery, neurosurgery.

=== Certificate Course in Modern Pharmacology (CCMP) ===
It is a one-year course conducted at the college for practising Homoeopathic General Practitioners (GP's) who wish to practice Allopathy and tide over the shortage of doctors in the State of Maharashtra.

Certificate Course in “Modern Pharmacology” For Registered Homoeopathic Practitioners in The State of Maharashtra, Sanctioned by Academic Council of Maharashtra University of Health Science (MUHS), Nasik.

== Notable alumni ==
Notable alumni include:

- Mahesh Dixit, DIB
- Shreeram Lagoo
- Mohan Agashe
- Jabbar Patel
- Shirish Hiremath
- Sharad Moreshwar Hardikar
- Himmatrao Bawaskar
- YS Chandrashekhar
- KB Grant
- R.S. Wadia
