= Siva Chinnatamby =

Sri Lankan obstetrician

Siva Chinnatamby

Siva Chinnatamby (c.1923 - 2000) was a Sri Lankan obstetrician who pioneered the use of modern contraceptives in the country.

== Biography ==
In 1961, Chinnatamby led the first oral contraceptive trials in Asia, at Ragama Hospital. In 1964, she led trials of intrauterine devices at Colombo North Hospital, and in 1968, she began trials of Depo-Provera.

In 1972 she was invited to give the Murugesar Sinnetamby Oration at the Sri Lanka Medical Association; her topic was "Successful treatment of infertility".

In the late 1960s, Chinnatamby was instrumental in establishing the first Zonta International club in Sri Lanka. At the end of her life, she bequeathed her home in Colombo to the University of Colombo, for use as residence for women students of the university. The Sri Lankan College of Obstetricians and Gynaecologists established a memorial lecture in her name.

== Publications ==
- Chinnatamby, S. (September 25, 1965). Intrauterine Contraceptive Device and Population. British Medical Journal, 2, 5464, 756.
- Chinnatamby, S. (November 1, 1971). A Comparison of the Long-Acting Contraceptive Agents Norethisterone Oenanthate and Medroxyprogesterone Acetate. The Australian and New Zealand Journal of Obstetrics and Gynaecology, 11, 4, 233-236.
- Chinnatamby, S. (May 24, 2010). The Evolution of Obstetrics in Ceylon from the Sinnetamby Era (1900) to Date. The Journal of the Asian Federation of Obstetrics and Gynaecology, 1, 1, 90-102.
