= Kirti (disambiguation) =

Kirti may refer to:

- Kirti Azad Indian athlete
- Kirti Kulhari (born 1985) Indian actress

== See also ==
- Kirthi (disambiguation)
