= Kruti Parekh =

India's first [test-tube baby

Kruti Parekh (born 1984) is a professional magician & India's first and foremost female mentalist.

== Education ==
Parekh studied engineering and information technology, with the intention of becoming an IT engineer.

== Magic career and accolades ==
As a child magician, Parekh featured several times on Doordarshan, India's national television channel. At the age of 11, she received the FIE Foundation National Award. In 1999, she was awarded the Global 500 Roll of Honour, by the United Nations Environment Programme.

She has received many national and international accolades including the "Yuva Ojaswini Award", an Indian national level award, and the Young Achievers Award by American Consulate. In 2002, she was selected as a Jury Member for the Children's Nobel Prize. She attended the World Youth Peace Summit - Asia Pacific in Bangkok, Thailand 2004 as a youth leader for peace. Her story has appeared in a book about normal kids doing heroic deeds published by Free Spirit Publishers, U.S.A. under the title of Kids Using Talent & Creativity. Her story was chosen as one of 30 stories around the world.

In 2023, Parekh became the first Indian magician to appear on the Penn and Teller: Fool Us show.
