= Ponna Wignaraja =

Sri Lankan academic, sociologist, and Professor

Deshamanya Ponna Wignaraja
- Born: 1926 (age 99–100); British Ceylon
- Citizenship: Sri Lankan
- Occupation: economist

Academic background
- Education: Economics
- Alma mater: University of Ceylon; Yale University

Academic work
- Discipline: Economics; Social science
- Sub-discipline: Development Studies
- Institutions: International Monetary Fund; World Bank; United Nations University

Deshamanya Ponna Wignaraja (1926) is a Sri Lankan academic, economist and social scientist. He was the Coordinator of South Asian Perspectives Network Association (the "SAPNA"), entity with ties of the United Nations University, and prior to that the Secretary-general of the Society for International Development at Rome (Italy).

== Early life and academic career ==
Born in Sri Lanka during British colonization, when it was still known as British Ceylon, Ponna Wignaraja was educated in economics from the University of Ceylon in 1948. After Wignaraja received graduate degree in United States at Yale University.

Between 1951 and 1953, Wignaraja was development advisor at International Monetary Fund (IMF). Thereafter, he was advisor at World Bank (1962–1967).

Ponna Wignaraja was Secretary-general of the Society for International Development (1981–1986). In 1991, he was vice chairman of the Independent South Asian Commission on Poverty Alleviation and he was chairman of the South Asian Perspectives Network Association (SAPNA).

In 1993, Ponna Wignaraja was awarded the highest civilian honour for national service in Sri Lanka: the honorifical title named Deshamanya.

He is father of the Sri Lankan researcher and economist Ganeshan Wignaraja.

== Publications ==
Among Wignaraja's publications are:

- A New strategy for development, s./d., 1976.
- A framework for rethinking the concept of appropriate technology for development, Vienna: United Nations Industrial Development Organization, 1978.
- Reversing anti-rural development, Roma: SID, 1984.
- The Challenge in South Asia: Development, Democracy and Regional Cooperation, United Nations University Press, 1989. (with Akmal Hussein)
- Women, poverty and resources, New Delhi; Newbury Park, Calif.: Sage, 1990.
- Participatory Development: Learning from South Asia, United Nations University Press, 1991.
- New Social Movements in the South: Empowering the People, Zed Books, 1993.
- Towards a Theory of Rural Development, Colombo: South Asian Perspectives Network Associations, 1998.
- Pro-Poor Growth and Governance in South Asia: Decentralization and Participatory Development, SAGE Publications, 2004. (with Susil Sirivardana)
- Economic democracy through pro-poor growth, Sage, 2009. (with Susil Sirivardana and Akmal Hussain)
