= Pabilis Silva =

Sri Lankan chef

Dr. Pabilis Silva පබිලිස් සිල්වා
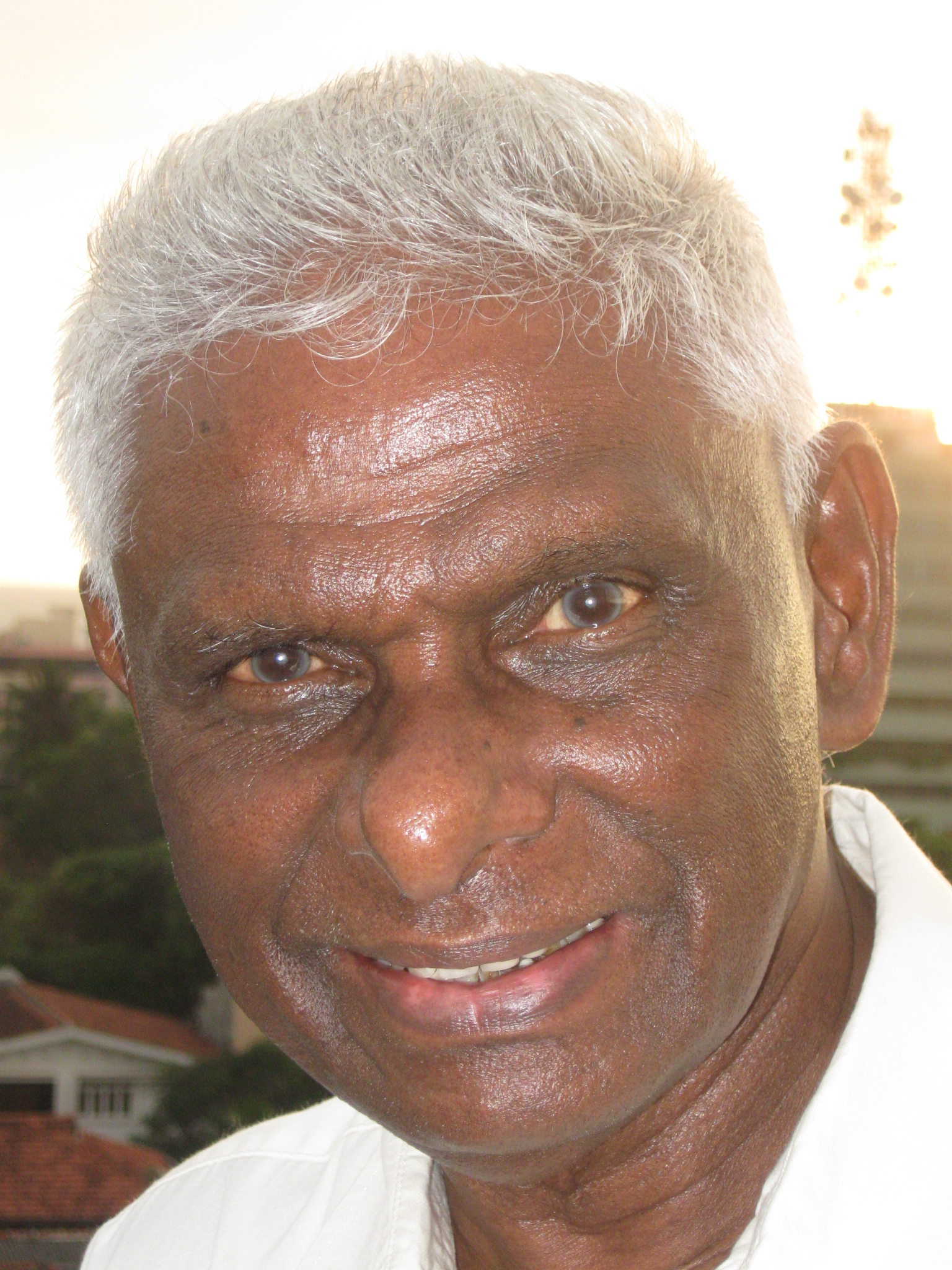
- Born: Tommadura Publis Silva; 24 April 1937 (age 89); Rathgama, Sri Lanka
- Education: Sirisumana Vidyalaya
- Occupations: Director - Culinary Affair & Promotions Mount Lavinia Hotel, Sri Lanka.
- Years active: 1956–present
- Spouse: Wimala Rajakaruna (1956)
- Children: 5
- Parents: Appu Singho (father); Kumarasinghe Podihami (mother)
- Awards: Deshabandu

Deshabandu Dr. Tommadura Publis Silva (born 24 April 1937) is a Sri Lankan chef and television personality. Considered as an icon in Sri Lankan cuisine, Silva has the honor of taking Sri Lankan Sinhala food to the international arena and his recipes are famous all around the world. Silva started as a coal miner in the hotel, later he became the Director - Culinary Affair & Promotions Mount Lavinia Hotel and is currently a member of the Board of Directors.

== People Life Pabilis Silva ==
Pabilis Silva was born on 24 April 1936 in Gammeddegoda, Rathgama, as the second of five children. His nickname was Kirimahatthaya. Both his father, Appu Singho, and his mother, Kumarasinghe Podihami, had no formal education. His father worked in social welfare, while his mother took on various jobs to support the family.

From an early age, Pabilis helped his mother sell vegetables at the local market to make ends meet. There were harsh times—he sometimes ate rotten pumpkins or went hungry. As a child, he also pulled nets, pushed empty carts, lifted wares for shops and took on odd jobs in households, and even working as a narrator. He even joined Buddhist monks for almsgiving rounds (pindapāta) and has been an abbot.

Pabilis had two brothers and two sisters. At around age six, he began school at Rajgama Devapathiraja, but attended for less than a month. When World War II began, he was moved to a nearby missionary school, where he stayed for under two years. After that, he enrolled at Sirisumana Vidyalaya. Known for being rebellious, he rarely applied himself academically and often faced punishment at school as a result.

As he grew older, Pabilis lacked a clear career path, as he showed no interest in the jobs he did to sustain himself. At age 20, in 1956, he married his childhood friend and later girlfriend, Wimalawathi Rajakaruna. They had known each other from school, and despite early doubts, their relationship deepened until they tied the knot. The responsibilities of marriage and fatherhood stirred his motivation to secure stable work, which slowly prompted his career into culinary arts. The couple had five children: three daughters (including Nishani Maheshika) and two sons. In 1978, they relocated with their family to Colombo.

== Culinary career ==
In 1952, Pabilis came to Colombo after running away from home. He tried to do one job at a time in Pettah and later tried to make a living by selling things one by one. He also acted a comedy character in a stage play done in the village. On the day of the Great Eclipse on June 20, 1955, he was working at a hotel in the Ibbanwala Junction area. After working at the hotel for a short time, he left for another job and eventually ended up as a tourist dealer in Pettah. However, he had to return to the village because of the 1956 communal riots.

In 1956, Pabilis got a job as a coal miner in kitchen at the Mount Lavinia Hotel through wife's elder brother. The first salary is forty rupees. At the hotel he met a chef named Uncle John. He made a curry dish from temple tree leaves. Seeing this, Pabilis walked all over Sri Lanka and found different types of food resources and culinary methods. As a result, more than 365 vegetables have been found in the country so far by Pabilis Silva. He also found 76 fruits, including carrots, beetroot, kohlrabi, and pepper. He got his first promotion to the position of a third grade chef. After fifteen years, he was the chief chef of Mount Lavinia. He always researched and searched for old food recipes. Later he made new dishes. That's his secret.

Pabilis currently holds two Guinness World Records. That is, the world's largest milk rice and the world's smallest recipe book. The world's largest milk rice made by using 1,000 kilos, is 62 feet long, 5 feet wide and 1.5 inches high. Also the length and breadth of the world's smallest recipe book is 1cm. It weighs 5 milligrams and is titled "Sri Lankawe Raja Bojana" in Sinhala and English.

The idea of adding Sri Lankan medicinal foods to make a culinary encyclopedia came at his young age. A few of colleagues and Pabilis Silva used to go to other people's estates and pick coconuts and eat them. One day he broke a coconut and took it to the sea and washed it with seawater. It tastes really good and then continued to do so. It was a starting point to try new things. With that idea for more than 40 years ago, Silva published a culinary book Mahasupavanshaya. In the book, 90% of the edible plants in Sri Lanka are published with photos. This includes 56 endemic potato varieties, 76 endemic fruits and 1450 endemic plants. The book is designed to be changed every two years. The book consists of a thousand pages. It was launched on 24 April 2017 at the BMICH.

In May 2016, he was felicitated for 60 years of dedicated service to Mount Lavinia Hotel at the Annual Staff Day.

== Beyond culinary ==
He also involved for a biographical documentary "Supika Siritha" directed by film director Bertram Nihal. Silva was the one who spent the money. Filming was done in Negombo, Chilaw, Pettah and Rathgama.

On 22 March 2017, he was honored with Deshabandu award by president Maithripala Sirisena.

On 23 January 2019, he was invited as the chief resource person for the fourth phase of the Sarthakarthwaye Sewaneli workshop organized by the Career Guidance Unit of the University of Sri Jayewardenepura.
