= Kirthi Tennakone =

Sri Lankan scientist

Kirthi Tennakone is a Sri Lankan scientist with an assortment of research interests in theoretical and experimental physics, chemistry and biological systems. He has authored over 350 publications covering a diverse variety of disciplines. He is the former Director of Institute of Fundamental Studies, Sri Lanka (now named as National Institute of Fundamental Studies) and the first Professor of Physics at the University of Ruhuna, Sri Lanka. He pursued studies leading to a doctoral degree in Theoretical Physics at the University of Hawaiʻi under supervision of Sandip Pakvasa. Pakvasa and Tennakone were the first to suggest that neutrinos may be massive and to consider the astrophysical implications. In condensed matter physics, Tennakone pioneered the studies on semiconducting properties copper(I) thiocyanate, a rare example of a transparent p-type semiconductor, currently adopted in many devices and developed techniques of its deposition as thin films. He was the first to introduce the concept of the dye-sensitized solid state solar cell and demonstrate a working prototype of the same. Sri Lanka Government recognized his contribution to research and education and awarded National Honors on two occasions. He was one of the Union of Concerned Scientists who signed to the document presented to world leaders in 1992 about environmental degradation that threatens global life support systems on this planet.

== Early life ==
Born 1940 in a Village in Sri Lanka near the town of Veyangoda, he was exposed rural environment in early childhood. He is a son of the poet and writer Piyathilaka Tennakone of Metitotumulla, Sri Lanka who inspired him to science and mathematics at an early stage. Kirthi Tennakone received primary education at the Central College, Veyangoda, Sri Lanka.

== Education ==
He earned a B.S in physics and mathematics from the University of Ceylon 1964. After serving as a teacher in the Department of Education for period of four years, he received an East-West Center Fellowship to pursue studies at the University of Hawaiʻi and obtained a PhD degree in theoretical physics in 1972. He returned to Sri Lanka accepting an academic position at the University of Jayewardenepura and later appointed to the Chair of Physics at the University of Ruhuna. When the first endowed Chair in Sri Lanka (Sumanasekara Chair in Natural Science) was commissioned at the Institute of Fundamental Studies, he was appointed to this position by the President of Sri Lanka on basis of the recommendation of a high ranking search committee. Subsequently, he served as the director of this institution for a period of thirteen years, concurrently holding a professorship.

He has held visiting research positions at the International Center for Theoretical Physics, Trieste; Niels Bohr Institute, Copenhagen; Japan Society for Promotion of Science, Invitation Fellowship at the Shizuoka University, Japan; University of Cincinnati and currently an adjunct professor of physics at Georgia State University.

== Recognition ==
Kirthi Tennakone has been awarded National Honors of the Government of Sri Lanka on two occasions, "Vidya Nidhi" in 1986 and "Desha Bandu" in 2005. University of Sri Jayewardenepura of Sri Lanka conferred an Honorary Doctor of Science Degree to him in 2007. He is a Fellow of The World Academy of Sciences, elected 1990. He was one of the invited scholars to visit Solar Cell Materials & Devices Group, Beijing, China.

== Research ==
Neutrino Physics: In 1972 Sandip Pakvasa and Kirthi Tennakone suggested that neutrinos may be massive and discussed consequences of massiveness, notably - astrophysical implications. They pointed out the possibility assessing the neutrino mass by detecting the light and neutrino signals of supernova explosion. Tennakone has also examined macroscopic changes in linear and angular momentum associated with neutrino bursts from astrophysical systems.

Condensed Matter Physics: Kirthi Tennakone and co-workers pioneered the studies on semiconducting properties Copper(I) Thiocyanate, a rare example of a transparent p-type semiconductor, currently adopted in many devices and developed techniques of its deposition as thin films. He has also worked on electrical conduction in unconventional materials, nanostructured films and electroceramics. Tennakone and co-workers introduced the idea of using crystal growth inhibitors to secure intimate contact and pore filling in nanostructured heterojunctions.

Solar Energy Conversion and Photochemistry: The concept of the dye-sensitized solid-state solar cell was first proposed by Tennakone et al. in a 1988 publication titled "Dye-sensitized solid-state solar cells". The invention of practical device based on the idea was also first reported by Tennakone et al. in 1995. Perovoskite solar cells are vigorously pursued nowadays are based on extremely thin layer of a low band gap semiconductor sandwiched between two nanostructured n and p type high band gap semiconductors, the concept subsequently referred to as eta cell was reported by Tennakone et al. in 1998. Dye-sensitized solar cells are generally based mesoporous films of TiO_{2,}.Tennakone’s group is also credited with development of a dye-sensitized cell of comparable efficiency adopting ZnO/SnO_{2}composite films. Tennakone et al. has also studied the dye-sensitization effect of plants derived compounds.

Biological Systems: Tennakone has worked on the problem of biological L-D stereoselection and right-left symmetries in plants., suggesting that former could be spontaneous symmetry breaking in prebiotic chemical reactions or rapid growth of accidentally created, self-replicating handed molecule in racemic prebiotic medium. According to his findings, right-left asymmetries in plants can be classified into three distinct categories. (a) All individuals of the species has same handedness. (b) Individuals have either right or left-handedness, occurring with equal probabilities. (c) Individuals have no definable handedness, but some organs possesses either right or left-handedness.

Static Electricity: Tennakone has published several papers in the area of static electricity including atmospheric effects. Recently he has hypothesized that perchlorate in Mars could be produced by electrolysis of sodium chloride following static electrification regolith and moisture condensation.

Aluminum Leaching: Tennakone observed that fluoride enhance leaching of aluminum from cooking utensils. A subsequent work and repetition of the experiments by Tennakone et al. found that at 1ppm of F^{−} leaching is not high as reported previously to pose a major toxicity issue. Later work of Tennakone and several other investigators have confirmed the enhancement Al leaching under culinary conditions, when F^{−} concentration is 10 ppm or more.
