= C.A. Coorey =

Deshamanya Chandana Aelian Coorey, SLAS (March 18, 1921 - ) was a Sri Lankan civil servant. He was the former Permanent Secretary of the Ministry of Finance & Treasury.

== Early life and education ==
Born in Panadura to Dr Henry Coorey and his wife Pussethi, he was the youngest of four brothers; Gerry H. Coorey, later Professor of Pathology, Clarrie O. Coorey later member of the Indian Civil Service and Lloyd R.Coorey a Proprietary Planter. Educated at the Royal College, Colombo, where he won the many prizes including the Turnour Prize and the de Soysa Science Prize. He won a scholarship at the University College, Colombo in 1939. There he read natural philosophy, and graduated First Class degree in chemistry in 1943 from the University of London winning the gold medal, and was selected for a government scholarship to Balliol College, Oxford. However, due to World War II he could not travel to Oxford.

== Career ==
He was appointed as an Assistant Lecturer in Chemistry however left the University of Ceylon when he was accepted to the Ceylon Civil Service in 1945. After serving as a civil service cadet, he was appointed in 1946 as an Assistant Government Agent, Kalmunai and served in many other capacities including that of Government Agent. In early 1970 he transferred to the Treasury and became the Deputy Secretary and later Secretary of the Treasury and Secretary to the Ministry of Finance in 1971. It was the most senior civil service post at the time. During his tenor, he introduced a program budgeting in the preparation of the estimates, whereby the programme of expenditure was published by every government department. He held to post until 1975 and retired from the Sri Lankan Administrative Service.

== Later life ==
He went on to become an executive director for Sri Lanka, Laos, and Afghanistan on the Board of Governors of the Asian Development Bank, founder Chairman of the National Development Bank (1979–1989) and Chairman of the Development and Finance Corporation of Ceylon (1990–1999). In 1992 he was awarded the title of Deshamanya by the government of Sri Lanaka.

He was married to his wife Lakshmi and had four children Dilrukshi, Mohan, Anura and Sharmini. The Deshamanya C.A. Coorey Memorial Prize is awarded annually at the Royal College Colombo in his memory.

He died in March 2004.
