= Noel Wimalasena =

Sri Lankan politician

Deshamanya Noel Wimalasena

1st Governor of Sabaragamuwa
- In office 30 April 1988 – 1993
- Preceded by: Office created
- Succeeded by: C. N. Saliya Mathew

14th Mayor of Kandy
- In office 1963–1963
- Preceded by: Sir Bennet Soysa
- Succeeded by: Edward Lionel Senanayake

Member of Parliament for Senkadagala
- In office 1965–1977
- Preceded by: Shelton Ranaraja
- Succeeded by: Shelton Ranaraja
- In office March 1960 – July 1960
- Succeeded by: Shelton Ranaraja

High Commissioner to the United Kingdom
- In office 1977–1981

Personal details
- Born: Nanediri Wimalasena; 23 March 1914 Kandy, Sri Lanka
- Died: 5 May 1994 (aged 80) Colombo, Sri Lanka
- Party: UNP
- Spouse: Prema Wijesekera née Fernando
- Children: Mangala, Vajira, Sanjani
- Education: Ananda College; Ceylon University College; Ceylon Law College
- Occupation: lawyer, politician, diplomat

Deshamanya Noel Wimalasena (23 March 1914 – 5 May 1994) was a Sri Lankan lawyer, politician and the first Governor of Sabaragamuwa.

== Early life and education ==
Nanediri Wimalasena was born on 23 March 1914 in Kandy, Sri Lanka. He attended Ananda College, Colombo, the Ceylon University College and the Ceylon Law College.

== Political career ==
In 1946 Wimalasena was elected to the Kandy Municipal Council, serving as Deputy Mayor in 1946 and as Mayor in 1963.

In March 1960 he ran as the UNP candidate for parliament in the Senkadagala Electoral District. He was successful, securing over 48% of the vote. However, as neither of the major political parties managed to obtain a sufficient majority in the election a new election was called. At the July 1960 election Wimalasena lost by a narrow margin of 25 votes to the SLFP candidate, Shelton Ranaraja.

At the 1965 parliamentary elections, Wimalasena won the seat of Senkadagala, defeating the sitting member, Ranaraja. Wimalasena served as the Parliamentary Secretary to the Minister of Finance between 1965 and 1970 in the Third Dudley Senanayake cabinet and between 1966 and 1970 was the Governor of the Asian Development Bank (Sri Lanka). He retained the seat in the subsequent 1970 election with over 50% of the vote however chose not to run in the 1977 election.

In December 1977 he was appointed as the Sri Lankan High Commissioner to the United Kingdom, serving until January 1981. Upon his return to Sri Lanka he was the Deputy Director-General for the Greater Colombo Economics Commission.

On 30 April 1988 he was appointed as the first Governor of Sabaragamuwa, serving until 1993, when he was succeeded by C. N. Saliya Mathew,

In 1993 he was awarded Deshamanya, the second-highest national honour of Sri Lanka.

== See also ==
- List of Sri Lankan non-career diplomats

Political offices
Preceded by Office created	Governor of Sabaragamuwa; 1988–1993	Succeeded by Saliya Mathew
