= St. Anthony's Group =

Sri Lankan conglomerate

- Industry: Conglomerate
- Founded: 1942; 84 years ago
- Founder: A. Y. S. Gnanam
- Headquarters: Colombo, Sri Lanka
- Area served: Sri Lanka
- Key people: Simon Rajaseelan Gnanam; Arul Selvaraj Gunaseelan Gnanam; Elijah Jeyaseelan Gnanam; Jeevan Gnanam
- Products: Hardware; textiles; roofing; media; construction; hospitality; farms; manufacturing; retail; solar; hydropower
- Subsidiaries: Tokyo Cement
- Website: www.anton.lk

St. Anthony's Group (St. Anthony's) is a Sri Lankan conglomerate company headquartered in Colombo, Sri Lanka. St. Anthony's Group owns businesses across Sri Lanka engaged in hardware, textiles, cement, roofing, media, construction, hospitality, farms, manufacturing, retail, solar and hydropower.
