= National Academy of Sciences of Sri Lanka =

The National Academy of Sciences of Sri Lanka
- Formation: 1976; 50 years ago
- Headquarters: Colombo, Sri Lanka
- Members: ~150 Fellows; 2 Honorary Fellows
- President: Nadira D. Karunaweera
- Website: nassl.org

The National Academy of Sciences of Sri Lanka (NASSL) is a high level, non-governmental scientific body, established in 1976, it was granted incorporated by an Act of Parliament in 1988.

The National Academy of Sciences of Sri Lanka fulfills a number of roles; promoting the dissemination of scientific knowledge, recognizing excellence in science, supporting outstanding science, providing scientific advice for policy, fostering international and global cooperation, education and public engagement and recognizing outstanding contributions to the advancement of science and acting as a consultative body to the Government of Sri Lanka on all matters and activities related to the application of science and technology in national development. Scientists who have achieved excellence in their respective scientific / technological fields are nominated by Fellows of the Academy to be considered for membership.

Admission to the Academy is by election following nomination and evaluation of the nominees. The membership of the NASSL was 125 in February 2012. The society is governed by its Council, which is chaired by the Society's President, according to a set of statutes and standing orders. The members of Council and the President are elected from and by its Fellows, the basic members of the society, who are themselves elected by existing Fellows. As of 2016, there were about 125 fellows. Fellows of the National Academy use the post-nominal FNASSL.
