= Ruby Hall Clinic =

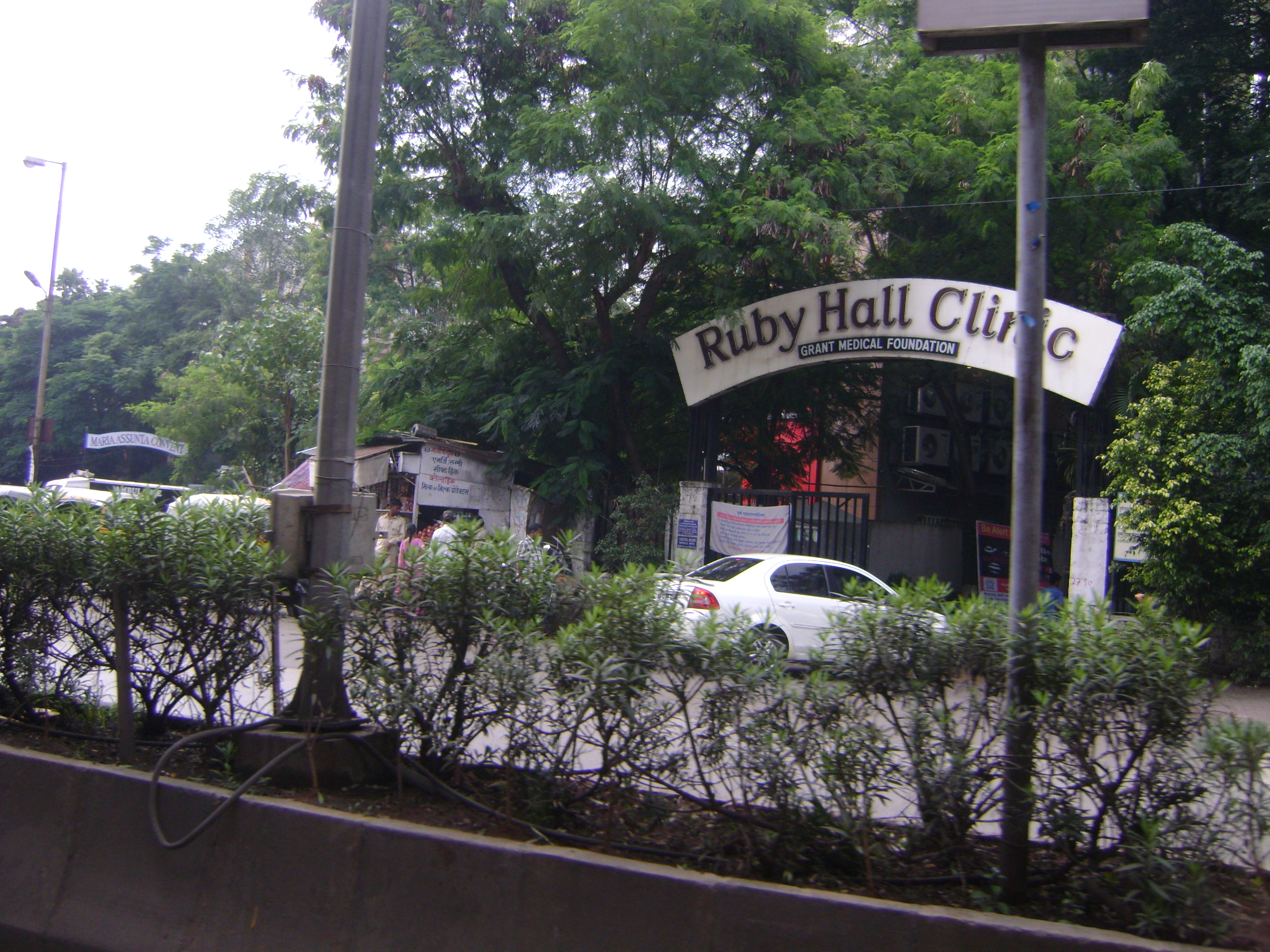

- Ruby Hall Clinic, Pune, India

Geography
- Location: Pune, India
- Coordinates: 18.5334°N 73.8772°E

Organisation
- Type: Super Speciality Teaching Hospital
- Affiliated university: Maharashtra University of Health Sciences, National Board of Examinations, College of Physicians & Surgeons of Mumbai

Services
- Standards: NABH & NABL Accredited
- Beds: 750

History
- Founded: 1959

Links
- Website: https://rubyhall.com/
- Lists: Hospitals in India

Ruby Hall Clinic is a hospital in the city of Pune, India, established in 1959. It is a 750-bed hospital with 2,450 dedicated staffers, 300 consultants, 650 panel doctors, and 1,500 paramedical staff. It was accredited by National Accreditation Board for Hospitals & Healthcare Providers (NABH).

It is a recognised Post Graduate Teaching Hospital for students of Maharashtra University of Health Sciences, National Board of Examinations, and College of Physicians & Surgeons of Mumbai. Dr. Grant is the Managing Trustee and Chief Cardiologist of Ruby Hall Clinic.

== History ==
Ruby Hall Clinic was established in 1959 by Dr. Keki Byramjee Grant. In 1966, Ruby Hall Clinic was converted from a private institution owned by Grant to a public charitable trust named Poona Medical Foundation. It was later converted to the Grant Medical Foundation in 2000, of which Grant was the chairman and managing trustee.

In 2012, the clinic collaborated with the Kalyani Group to launch a special institute for prostate cancer research.

== Facilities ==
Ruby Hall Clinic includes the following medical sectors: Cardiology, Cardiac Surgery, Neurology, Nuclear Medicine Department (Digital PET-CT & SPECT CT), Diagnostic Center, Intensive Care Units, a Blood Bank and Cancer Unit. In 1999, the hospital ranked first in India for having the largest number of ICU beds (76). The number of ICU beds available has increased to 130.
