= Deshamanya =

Second-highest national honour of Sri Lanka

Deshamanya දේශමාන්‍ය தேசமான்ய

Awarded by The Government of Sri Lanka
- Type: Title of honor/Order of merit
- Eligibility: Sri Lankan citizens
- Criteria: Highly notable service to the nation
- Status: Currently constituted

Statistics
- First induction: 1986
- Last induction: 2019

Precedence
- Next (higher): Sri Lankabhimanya
- Next (lower): Deshabandhu

Deshamanya (Sinhala: දේශමාන්‍ය, romanized: Dēshamāṉya; Tamil: தேசமான்ய, romanized: Tēcamāṉya; "Pride of the Nation") is the second-highest national honour of Sri Lanka awarded by the Government of Sri Lanka as a civil honour. It is awarded for "highly meritorious service", and is conventionally used as a title or prefix to the recipient's name.

== Recipients ==
1986

- P. R. Anthonis – surgeon and academic
- Gamani Corea – economist, civil servant and diplomat
- M. C. M. Kaleel – physician, social worker and politician
- Malage George Victor Perera Wijewickrama Samarasinghe
- Miliani Sansoni – Chief Justice of Ceylon
- Victor Tennekoon – Chief Justice of Ceylon

1987

- Edwin Felix Dias Abeysinghe
- Neville Kanakeratne – diplomat
- V. Manicavasagar – Supreme Court Justice, Chancellor University of Jaffna
- Wijetunga Mudiyansela Tillekeratne

1988

- Hector Wilfred Jayewardene – lawyer, member United Nations Commission on Human Rights
- Thambiah Sivagnanam

1989

- Shiva Pasupati – Solicitor General of Sri Lanka, Attorney General of Sri Lanka

1990

- Sepala Attygalle – Commander of the Army
- Nandadeva Wijesekera
- Badi-ud-din Mahmud – politician, Minister of Education
- Baku Mahadeva – civil servant
- Nanayakkara Wasam James Mudalige

1991

- E. L. Senanayake – politician, Speaker of the Parliament of Sri Lanka
- Montague Jayawickrama – politician, cabinet minister, governor
- K. W. Devanayagam – lawyer, politician, minister
- Nissanka Wijeyeratne – civil servant, politician
- Sivagamie Verina Obeyasekera
- Christopher Weeramantry
- Neville Ubesinghe Jayawardena
- Ivan Samarawickrema
- Chandirapal Chanmugam
- Abdul Caffoor Mohamed Ameer - Queen's Counsel, Attorney General of Sri Lanka

1992

- Abdul Bakeer Markar – politician
- Hewa Komanage Dharmadasa
- Ananda Weihena Palliya Guruge – diplomat, Buddhist scholar
- E. L. B. Hurulle – politician
- Abdul Majeed Mohamed Sahabdeen
- Suppiah Sharvananda – Chief Justice of Sri Lanka, provincial governor
- Linus Silva
- Nissanka Wijewardane

1993

- Geoffrey Bawa – Architect
- C. A. Coorey
- Felix Stanley Christopher Perera Kalpage
- H. W. Thambiah
- Richard Udugama – Major General
- Ponna Wignaraja
- Noel Wimalasena

1994

- Jayantha Kelegama
- Lalith Kotelawala – Businessman
- Nandadasa Kodagoda – Academic
- Godfrey Gunatilleke
- Arulanandam Yesuadiam Samuel Gnanam
- Nugegoda Gabadage Pablis Panditharatna
- Surendra Ramachandran
- Deraniyagalage Basil Ivor Pieris Samaranayake Siriwardhana

1996

- Duleep Mendis – Sri Lanka national cricket captain
- Arjuna Ranatunga – Sri Lanka national cricket captain

1998

- Charitha Prasanna de Silva
- Ken Balendra – Businessman
- Doreen Winifred Wickramasinghe
- Tamara Kumari Illangaratne
- Elanga Devapriya Wickremanayake
- R. K. W. Goonesekera – Academic, Lawyer
- Vernon Mendis – Diplomat
- H. L. de Silva – Diplomat
- A. T. Kovoor – Academic
- Ranjit Abeysuriya – lawyer
- Duncan White – Olympic medalist
- Christopher Rajindra Panabokke
- W. D. Amaradeva – Music Director
- Chitrasena – Dancer

2005

- Kamalika Priyaderi Abeyaratne
- William Alwis
- Mahesh Amalean – Engineer and industrialist
- Sohli E. Captain
- Radhika Coomaraswamy – Academic, Human Rights Activist, Under-Secretary-General of the United Nations
- Lalith de Mel
- Rohan de Saram – Cellist
- Chandrananda de Silva
- Ashley de Vos – Architect
- Jayaratne Banda Dissanayake
- M. T. A. Furkhan
- D. Basil Goonesekera
- Cyril Herath – Inspector General of Police
- Asoka Kanthilal Jayawardhana
- A. S. Jayawarden – Sri Lankan economist and civil servant
- Harry Jayawardena – Businessman
- Nihal Jinasena – industrialist and sportsman
- Premasiri Khemadasa – Composer
- W. D. Lakshman
- Paddy Mendis – Air Chief Marshal
- Sunil Mendis – former Governor of the Central Bank of Sri Lanka
- J. B. Peiris – Senior Neurologist, Researcher and Pioneer of Neurology
- M. D. D. Peiris
- Denis Perera – Lieutenant General
- P. Ramanathan – Former Justice of the Supreme Court and Provincial Governor
- P. Deva Rodrigo
- Mano Selvanathan
- A. H. Sheriffdeen – Surgeon, academic and voluntary worker
- Roland Silva
- Bradman Weerakoon – Civil servant
- Kandekumara Hapudoragamage Jothiyarathna Wijayadasa
- Ray Wijewardene – Academic, Engineer

2007

- James Peter Obeyesekere III – Politician and aviator

2008

- Ramesh Mahendran

2017

- Abbasally Akbar
- K. M. de Silva
- Tissa Devendra
- Colvin Goonaratna
- Amaradasa Gunawardana
- Devanesan Nesiah
- Nandadasa Rajapaksha
- Priyani Soysa
- Latha Walpola
- Mineka Presantha Wickramasingha
- Bhanuka Wimalasooriya

2019

- Indrajit Coomaraswamy
- Ajith De Soyza
- Merrill J. Fernando
- Mohan Munasinghe
- Moragoda Christopher Walter Pinto
- Surath Wickremesinghe
