= Keki Byramjee Grant =

Indian cardiologist (1920–2011)

- Born: 28 November 1920; Tamil Nadu, India
- Died: 4 January 2011 (aged 90); Pune
- Resting place: Koregaon Park Cemetery, Pune
- Occupation: Cardiologist
- Spouse: Tehmi
- Children: Pervez Grant; Zareen
- Awards: Padma Bhushan

Keki Byramjee Grant (28 November 1920 – 4 January 2011) was an Indian cardiologist from Pune, Maharashtra, one of the first and respected cardiologists in the country and the founder of Grant Medical Foundation, which runs the Ruby Hall Clinic, a nationally accredited hospital in Pune. The Government of India honoured him, posthumously in 2011, with Padma Bhushan, the third highest civilian award, for his services to the medical science.

== Background and early life ==
Keki Byramjee Grant was born on 28 November 1920 in Tamil Nadu to a Parsi family. His father, Byram Dosabhai was an auditor employed with Indian Railways and the family moved to Pune in 1922. As there was no boys' primary school locally, Keki studied in a Girls' School, St. Helena School. Later, he was shifted to Hutching's High School and St. Vincent High School.

== Ruby Hall Clinic ==
Keki graduated from Wadia College, Pune and joined Grant Medical College and Sir Jamshedjee Jeejeebhoy Group of Hospitals, Mumbai from where he secured his MBBS. Grant started the practice as a Physician under E. H. Cowaji for a monthly stipend of ₹200. A year later, he started teaching at the Sassoon General Hospital, named after David Sassoon, and moved his practice to Jehangir Hospital, Pune. Breaking his practice, he did his post graduation in Cardiology, under the guidance of cardiologist, Paul White, at the Mass General Hospital, Boston, Massachusetts, USA and later returned to Jehangir Hospital to resume practice.

A difference of opinion with Cowaji prompted Grant to think about starting a hospital of his own. The result was a four-bed hospital, Ruby Hall Clinic, a name inspired by the palace of the Governor General who named it after his wife, Ruby, started on rented premises and opened to public in 1959. Six years later, in 1964, Grant purchased the palace property with the help of a bank loan to house the hospital. In 1966, he founded a trust, the Grant Medical Foundation and the hospital was transferred to the care of the Trust.

The hospital, over a period of time, grew to become a 550-bed hospital, and the first nationally accredited hospital in Pune. He was successful in bringing coronary angioplasty, Coronary Artery Bypass Grafting, CT Scan, Magnetic Resonance Imaging, image intensifier X-ray, cadaveric organ donation and the first Image Guided Radio Therapy (IGRT) for cancer to Ruby Hall and thus making it an advanced centre of medical care. The hospital is reported to have the highest number of ICU beds, counting 76, in the country.

== Personal life ==
Grant was married to Tehmi, who predeceased him; the couple had a son and a daughter. Their son, Pervez Grant, is a cardiologist at Ruby Hall.

In 1986, while Grant was flying from Mumbai to London, the aircraft was hijacked by terrorists. The ensuing shoot-out left 25 people dead and around 100 injured, including Grant, who was hit by a bullet on his knee. He however survived to live for a further 25 years.

Grant died on 4 January 2011, aged 90, at Ruby Hall Clinic, succumbing to respiratory illnesses. The announcement awarding him the Padma Bhushan came just a few days after his death.

== Awards and recognitions ==
- Padma Bhushan – 2011
- Professor Emeritus of Medicine and Cardiology – BJ Medical College and Sassoon Hospital
- Punya Bhushan Award – Tridal – 2004
- Fellow, American College of Chest Physicians
- Founder fellow, – Indian College of Physicians
