= 2026 in Sri Lanka =

- Decades: 2000s; 2010s; 2020s
- See also: Other events of 2026; Timeline of Sri Lankan history

The following lists notable events that will occur and take place during 2026 in Sri Lanka.

== Incumbents ==
=== National ===
President	Prime Minister	Speaker	Chief Justice	Opposition Leader
Anura Kumara Dissanayake (Age 58)	Harini Amarasuriya (Age 56)	Jagath Wickramaratne (Age 58)	Padman Surasena	Sajith Premadasa (Age 59)
National People's Power (since 23 September 2024)	National People's Power (since 24 September 2024)	National People's Power (since 17 December 2024)	Independent (since 27 July 2025)	Samagi Jana Balawegaya (since 3 January 2020)

=== Provincial ===
Governors

- Central Province – Harsha Suranga Fernando
- Eastern Province – Jayantha Lal Ratnasekera
- North Central Province – Wasantha Kumara Wimalasiri
- Northern Province – N. Vedanayagam
- North Western Province – Tissa Kumarasiri
- Sabaragamuwa Province – Champa Janaki Rajaratne
- Southern Province – Susiripala Manawadu
- Uva Province – Kapila Jayasekera
- Western Province – Hanif Yusuf

== Culture ==
- List of 2026 Sri Lankan films

== Foreign relations ==
- List of international presidential trips made by Anura Kumara Dissanayake
- List of international prime ministerial trips made by Harini Amarasuriya
- List of state visits received by Anura Kumara Dissanayake

== Ongoing events ==
- Red Sea crisis (since 19 October 2023)
- Operation Yukthiya (since 17 December 2023)

== Events by month ==
=== January ===
- 2 January – Kasun Munasinghe, chairman of the Matugama Pradeshiya Sabha from the Samagi Jana Balawegaya, is remanded on charges of obstructing the duties of the secretary of the local council.
- 5 January – Johnston Fernando, a former cabinet minister and MP, along with his son, Jerome Kenneth Fernando, is arrested by the Financial Crimes Investigation Division (FCID) and remanded on charges of alleged misuse of state property.
- 6 January – Ray Jayawardhana is appointed as the next president of the California Institute of Technology (Caltech), with effect from 1 July 2026.
- 7 January
  - General Upendra Dwivedi, Chief of the Army Staff (COAS) of the Indian Army, arrives in Sri Lanka on a two-day official visit.
  - A Cessna 208 Caravan Amphibian aircraft operated by Cinnamon Air plunges into Lake Gregory in Nuwara Eliya while attempting to land at the nearby Lake Gregory Waterdrome, injuring the two pilots.
  - President Donald Trump orders the withdrawal of United States from 66 international organisations including the Colombo Plan Council.
- 9 January – The Ministry of Environment instructs the Central Environmental Authority (CEA) to halt all construction activities in the vicinity of the Ambuluwawa tower and the Ambuluwawa mountain region.
- 12 January – Wang Yi, director of the Office of the Central Foreign Affairs Commission of the Chinese Communist Party (CCP) and Minister of Foreign Affairs of China, arrives in Sri Lanka on a stopover.
- 13 January – The government officially inaugurates the Rebuilding Sri Lanka national programme, which has been established to efficiently coordinate the country's reconstruction efforts following Cyclone Ditwah.
- 17 January – A purple star sapphire named Star of Pure Land, weighing 3,563 carats (712.6 g; 25.14 oz), is unveiled in Sri Lanka and is claimed to be the world's largest documented specimen of its kind.
- 19 January
  - Darshana Samaraweera, deputy director general of languages, humanities and social sciences at the National Institute of Education (NIE), which falls under the purview of the Minister of Education, Higher Education and Vocational Education, and two other officials are placed on compulsory leave pending an inquiry into the controversial inclusion of a URL linking to an adult gay chat website in the newly introduced grade six English module. Previously, Manjula Vithanapathirana, director general of the NIE, temporarily stepped down from her position in connection with the same incident.
  - Mazagon Dock Shipbuilders of India acquires 164,916,229 ordinary shares in Colombo Dockyard for Rs. 6.6 billion, approximately US$21.3 million, representing a 41.73% stake in the company.
- 21 January – Ceylon Biscuits Limited (CBL) announces the acquisition of PT Tri Jaya Tangguh Indonesia (TJT), a coconut processing facility, with an investment exceeding US$25 million.
- 23 January – Chaminda Kularatne, deputy secretary general of the Parliament of Sri Lanka, is suspended pending an inquiry into alleged irregularities related to his appointment.
- 25 January – The International Finance Corporation (IFC), a member of the World Bank Group, announces an investment programme of US$166 million to support local businesses and stabilise the Sri Lankan economy.
- 26 January – Ambeon Holdings, through its subsidiary Ambeon Essentials, enters into a sale and purchase agreement (SPA) to acquire a 51.11% controlling stake in Harischandra Mills through the purchase of 918,118 shares.
- 28 January
  - Tamim Rahman, the former owner of the Dambulla Thunders franchise, pleads guilty to match-fixing charges during the 2024 Lanka Premier League and is sentenced to a four-year prison term, suspended for five years, along with a fine of Rs. 24 million, approximately US$78,155, by the Colombo High Court.
  - Saman Ekanayake, the former secretary to the president, is remanded until 11 February 2026 by the Colombo Magistrate's Court over charges of alleged misuse of public funds during the tenure of President Ranil Wickremesinghe.

=== February ===
- 4 February – Acharya Devvrat, the Governor of Gujarat, and Harsh Sanghavi, the deputy chief minister of Gujarat, arrives in Sri Lanka accompanying the Devni Mori relics of The Buddha. The exposition of the relics will be held at Gangaramaya Temple from 4 to 11 February.
- 5 February – Samudika Jayarathna is appointed as the 42nd Auditor General of Sri Lanka, becoming the first woman to hold the post.
- 7 February – The 2026 Men's T20 World Cup, jointly hosted by India and Sri Lanka, commences with Pakistan playing the Netherlands at the Sinhalese Sports Club Cricket Ground (SSC) in Colombo.
- 9 February – Mangubhai C. Patel, the Governor of Madhya Pradesh, and Chowna Mein, the deputy chief minister of Arunachal Pradesh, arrives in Sri Lanka to facilitate the return of Devni Mori relics back to India.
- 11 February – Twelve individuals are sentenced to death by a trial-at-bar of the Gampaha High Court for the murder of former MP Amarakeerthi Athukorala and his security officer on 9 May 2022 in Nittambuwa during the 2022 Sri Lankan protests. Four defendants receive suspended prison sentences, while 23 others are acquitted. Capital punishment in Sri Lanka has not been enforced since 23 June 1976.
- 16 February – Kristalina Georgieva, managing director of the International Monetary Fund (IMF), arrives in Sri Lanka on a three-day official visit.
- 17 February
  - David Lammy, the deputy prime minister, secretary of state for justice and lord chancellor of the United Kingdom, arrives in Sri Lanka on an official visit.
  - Parliament votes 154–2 to abolish pensions granted to former Members (MPs).
  - Sandro Veronesi, the founder and group president of Oniverse, announces a €30 million (approximately US$35 million) investment in Sri Lanka.
  - The 2025 G.C.E. Ordinary Level (O/L) Examination commence with a total of 451,463 candidates sitting for the examination at 3,545 centres island wide.
- 19 February – Admiral Stephen Koehler, commander of the United States Pacific Fleet, arrives in Sri Lanka on an official visit.
- 21 February – Ceylonese Rugby & Football Club (CR & FC) wins the 2025–26 Maliban Inter-Club 'A' Division Rugby League, securing the domestic inter-club rugby title.
- 22 February – The 2026 Ironman 70.3 Colombo triathlon is held at Port City Colombo.
- 24 February – Professor Susiripala Manawadu is appointed as the 14th Governor of the Southern Province, following the death of previous governor Bandula Harischandra in November 2025.
- 25 February – Major General Suresh Sallay, the former head of the State Intelligence Service, is arrested on suspicion of "conspiracy and aiding and abetting" the 2019 Sri Lanka Easter bombings.
- 27 February – Sri Lankan-born baker Sithamparappillai Jegatheepan wins the 2026 Concours de la meilleure baguette de Paris.

=== March ===
- 4 March – A United States Navy submarine sinks the Iranian Navy frigate IRIS Dena, approximately 40 nautical miles (74 km; 46 mi) off the southern coast of Sri Lanka, outside the territorial waters but within the exclusive economic zone, in an event related to the 2026 Iran war. The Sri Lanka Navy rescues 32 survivors from the crew of 180 and recover 87 bodies, with about 60 sailors still unaccounted for. The submarine which was involved in the engagement is later identified as USS Charlotte.
- 6 March – The Sri Lanka Navy interns the Iranian Navy replenishment ship IRIS Bushehr and its 208 crew members after the vessel requested assistance following the sinking of IRIS Dena, and docks the ship at Trincomalee Harbour. These actions are governed by the Hague Convention of 1907 (XIII) Convention concerning the Rights and Duties of Neutral Powers in Naval War.
- 7 March – Ceylonese Rugby & Football Club (CR & FC) wins the 2026 Clifford Cup inter-club knockout rugby tournament, defeating Havelock Sports Club 12–10 in the final at CR & FC Grounds, Colombo, to complete the domestic double for the 2025–26 season.
- 9 March
  - The Ceylon Electricity Board (CEB) is officially dissolved with effect from today and replaced by six state-owned companies (SOE) under the government's CEB restructuring programme.
  - Gary Kirsten, a South African cricket coach and former cricketer, is appointed head coach of the Sri Lanka national cricket team by Sri Lanka Cricket on a two-year contract commencing on 15 April 2026.
  - Sir Mark Tucker, former chairman of HSBC and current independent non-executive chairman of AIA Group, arrives in Sri Lanka to deliver the keynote address at the forum "Reconnecting to Capital, and Repositioning Sri Lanka in a Fragmenting World", organised by the Sri Lanka Institute of Directors, on 10 March at the Port City Colombo.
- 13 March – Sri Lanka repatriates the remains of 84 Iranian sailors killed in the sinking of IRIS Dena on 4 March.
- 15 March – The Sri Lankan government reintroduces the digital QR code-based National Fuel Pass system to ration fuel sales to motorists in order to conserve fuel amid the effects of the 2026 Iran war and the 2026 Strait of Hormuz crisis.
- 16 March – The government declares every Wednesday a public holiday, reverting to a four-day working week to conserve fuel.
- 19 March – Sergio Gor, the United States Ambassador to India and special envoy for South and Central Asian Affairs, arrives in Sri Lanka on an official visit.
- 22 March – The government imposes a 25% increase in fuel prices.
- 23 March – Masato Kanda, president of the Asian Development Bank, arrives in Sri Lanka on an official visit.
- 24 March – Brito Fernando is awarded the Per Anger Prize 2026, the Swedish Government's international prize for human rights and democracy, for his work seeking truth and justice for people who have disappeared involuntarily in Sri Lanka during periods of political violence and civil war.
- 26 March – The Supreme Court of Sri Lanka conducts the country's first paperless court hearing, held entirely on a digital system under the e-Court Project.
- 27 March
  - Kumara Jayakody, the Minister of Energy and MP from National People's Power, is served with indictments before the Colombo High Court in connection with allegations of corruption that caused a loss of Rs. 8,859,708 (approximately US$28,218) to the state in 2016.
  - The Supreme Court of Sri Lanka rules that Keheliya Rambukwella, a former cabinet minister and MP, along with several others, had violated the fundamental rights of the public by procuring health supplies in breach of standard procurement procedures in 2022. He is ordered to pay Rs. 75 million (approximately US$239,000) to the state, while the others are ordered to pay varying amounts.
  - Kamal Amarasinghe, the Commissioner General of Motor Traffic, is arrested by the Criminal Investigation Department in connection with an investigation into alleged irregularities in vehicle registration.

=== April ===
- 2 April
  - NDB Bank detectes an employee-linked fraud amounting to Rs. 380 million (approximately US$1.21 million). On 6 April 2026, the bank revises this figure to Rs. 13.2 billion (approximately US$41.93 million) in a disclosure to the Colombo Stock Exchange.
  - The National Audit Office, in a special audit report, states that irregularities have occurred and proper procedures were not followed in the procurement of coal for the Lakvijaya Power Station for the 2025–2026 season.
- 4 April – Trinity College wins the 2026 President's Trophy inter-school knockout rugby tournament, defeating Royal College 58–26 in the final held at Sugathadasa Stadium, Colombo.
- 10 April – The motion of no confidence presented against Kumara Jayakody, Minister of Energy, is defeated in Parliament by a majority of 104 votes, with 153 members voting against and 43 in favour.
- 15 April – Sri Lanka repatriates 238 Iranian sailors from the IRIS Bushehr and the IRIS Dena, both damaged during the Iran war, after providing temporary shelter on humanitarian grounds.
- 16 April – Sri Lanka Customs officials arrest nine Chinese nationals at Bandaranaike International Airport in Colombo for attempting to smuggle communication equipment concealed on their bodies, which officials say is intended for use in internet fraud operations.
- 17 April
  - President Anura Kumara Dissanayake appoints a three-member Presidential Commission of Inquiry, chaired by justice of the Supreme Court Gihan Kulatunga, to investigate coal purchases made for the generation of electricity, covering the period from the inception of coal-based power generation in Sri Lanka until 16 April 2026.
  - Kumara Jayakody, Minister of Energy, and Udayanga Hemapala, secretary to the Ministry of Energy, resign from their respective posts to facilitate an impartial and independent inquiry into coal imports.
- 19 April – C. P. Radhakrishnan, vice president of India, arrives in Sri Lanka on an official visit.
- 20 April – Anura Karunathilake is appointed Minister of Energy, in addition to his portfolio of Minister of Ports and Civil Aviation.
- 21 April – Ven. Pannakara Thero arrives in Sri Lanka at the invitation of President Dissanayake to undertake a Walk for Peace from 22 April, commencing in Dambulla and concluding on 28 April at Independence Square in Colombo, covering a distance of approximately 188 kilometres (117 mi). The procession will carry a sapling from the Jaya Sri Maha Bodhi, and the thero will be accompanied by other Buddhist monks and Aloka, a rescue dog of Indian origin.
- 22 April – The Finance, Planning and Economic Development Ministry, under President Dissanayake, claims that US$2.5 million (approximately Rs. 800 million), part of a US$22.9 million (approximately Rs. 7.3 billion) bilateral debt repayment to Australia, was diverted by a hacker following a breach of the ministry's systems. The ministry further claims that the cyberattack and the subsequent fraud were initially identified in January 2026.
- 25 April
  - Eranga Weeraratne, deputy minister of Digital Economy, states that the US$2.5 million fraud at the Finance, Planning and Economic Development Ministry is a phishing and impersonation scam, not a system hack.
  - Twenty-two Buddhist monks are arrested at Bandaranaike International Airport, Negombo, for smuggling 110 kilograms (240 pounds) of cannabis concealed in their luggage.
- 28 April – Nalinda Jayatissa, Minister of Health and Mass Media and Cabinet spokesperson, states that an amount of US$625,000 (approximately Rs. 200 million) remitted to the United States Postal Service has not been received by the intended recipient, and that investigations are underway to determine the cause of the discrepancy and trace the funds.
- 29 April
  - Shammi Silva, president of Sri Lanka Cricket, along with all office-bearers and members of the executive committee, resign from their posts with effect from today.
  - Sunil Kumara Gamage, Minister of Sports and Youth Affairs, appoints Eran Wickramaratne, a former Member of Parliament, as chairman of a nine-member interim committee (Sri Lanka Cricket Transformation Committee) to manage Sri Lanka Cricket until fresh elections are conducted and also to implement structural reforms.
- 30 April – An official interdicted pending inquiry into the US$2.5 million cyber fraud at the Finance, Planning and Economic Development Ministry is found dead at his home.

=== May ===
- 3 May
  - Mohamed Muizzu, President of the Maldives, arrives in Sri Lanka on a state visit.
  - Mikhail Murashko, Minister of Health of Russia, arrives in Sri Lanka on an official visit.
- 7 May
  - Sri Lanka Police arrest 30 Chinese and Vietnamese nationals in Colombo in a crackdown on cyberscams in the country, raising the total number of those detained to 261.
  - The Welfare Benefits Board, which falls under the purview of the Ministry of Finance, Planning and Economic Development, states that Rs. 248.8 million (approximately US$772,415) has erroneously been paid to nearly 50,000 Aswesuma beneficiaries in April 2026 due to duplicate payments.
  - Tô Lâm, general secretary of the Communist Party of Vietnam and president of Vietnam, arrives in Sri Lanka on a state visit.
- 8 May
  - Kapila Chandrasena, an airline and telecommunications executive who served as the CEO of SriLankan Airlines, Mihin Lanka and Mobitel, is found dead at his home in Kollupitiya, Colombo under suspicious circumstances, according to Sri Lanka Police.
  - Ashardeen Moinudeen, deputy mayor of the Kurunegala Municipal Council and a member of the All Ceylon Makkal Congress, is arrested by the Commission to Investigate Allegations of Bribery or Corruption (CIABOC) for allegedly soliciting a bribe of Rs. 3 million (approximately US$9,320).
- 9 May – Senior Buddhist monk Pallegama Hemarathana Thero is arrested on charges of raping a 15-year old girl.
- 15 May
  - Jagath Samantha, former chairman of the Arachchikattuwa Pradeshiya Sabha and brother of the late Sanath Nishantha, is sentenced to five years and six months' imprisonment by the Chilaw High Court after being found guilty of assaulting the divisional secretary of Arachchikattuwa.
  - Anura Karunathilake, Minister of Ports, Aviation, and Energy, states that an error in the payment of an amount of Dhs 74,000 (approximately Rs. 6.5 million; US$21,150) to a SriLankan Airlines service provider was identified in February 2026, and that investigations are ongoing.
  - PayPal expands its services to Sri Lanka with Bank of Ceylon, Commercial Bank of Ceylon and Sampath Bank as initial banking partners.
- 16 May – Further to the fraudulent payment incident reported by the Minister of Ports, Aviation and Energy on 15 May, SriLankan Airlines confirms that two separate financial incidents had occurred, involving a payment of Dhs 974,000 (approximately Rs. 87.15 million; US$265,215) to a compromised service provider account and the misappropriation of ₹22 million (approximately Rs. 75.36 million; US$229,237) in funds at its Chennai, India, office over a period of time.
- 17 May – People's Bank states that Rs. 656 million (approximately US$2 million) had been mistakenly paid to customers due to an exchange rate error in its remittance platform, affecting transactions processed between May 2023 and March 2026.
- 18 May – Air Chief Marshal Amar Preet Singh, Chief of the Air Staff of the Indian Air Force, arrives in Sri Lanka on a three-day official visit.
- 21 May – Hiniduma Sunil Senevi, Minister of Buddha Sasana, Religious and Cultural Affairs, informs the Parliament that 42 ancient paintings had gone missing from the National Art Gallery, which has been closed for renovations since 2012.
- 25 May
  - The Department of Immigration and Emigration of Sri Lanka announces a change in country's visa policy with a free-of-charge Electronic Travel Authorization (ETA) for tourist purposes, valid for a period of 30 days for nationals of 40 countries.
  - The 2026 Asia Rugby Championship commences with Sri Lanka playing Hong Kong at the Colombo Racecourse, with Hong Kong emerging as winners 15–14.
- 26 May
  - Biologists Suyama H. Boyagoda, Madhava Meegaskumbura and Kelum Manamendra-Arachchi identify a new rodent species of the genus Mus, subgenus Pyromys, endemic to Sri Lanka.
  - The Central Bank of Sri Lanka raises interest rates by 100 basis points, the first rate hike in three years, in addition to increasing the overnight policy rate from 7.75% to 8.75%.
- 27 May – Amnesty International alleges that Malaiyaha Tamil workers in Sri Lanka's plantation sector suffer serious labour abuses meeting many of the International Labour Organization's indicators of forced labour, while being denied access to the country's labour protections.
- 28 May – Sri Lanka establishes a new high commission in Wellington, New Zealand.
- 31 May
  - The government instructs the Department of Immigration and Emigration to cancel the procurement process for the e-passport project with immediate effect.
  - Rumesh Tharanga wins the silver medal in the men's javelin throw at the 2026 Meeting International Mohammed VI d'Athlétisme de Rabat in Rabat, Morocco, the third leg of the 2026 Diamond League. His throw of 85.97 metres (282.1 ft) also places him fifth in the world men's javelin throw rankings.

=== June ===
- 2 June – The United States Trade Representative names Sri Lanka among 54 nations that have failed to impose and effectively enforce a prohibition on the importation of goods produced with forced labour, following an investigation conducted under Section 301(b)(1) of the Trade Act. A further six countries are named for failing to effectively enforce such a prohibition.
- 3 June – A fire at an unregistered nursing home in Anguruwatota, near Horana, kills 13 people.
- 4 June
  - Rumesh Tharanga wins the gold medal in the men's javelin throw at the 2026 Golden Gala in Rome, Italy, the fourth leg of the 2026 Diamond League. His throw of 92.62 metres (303.9 ft) sets a new meet record, national record, and world-leading mark for the season to date, as well as a personal best.
  - SLNS Samudravijaya (P628), formerly USCGC Decisive (WMEC-629), a Reliance-class medium endurance cutter, is formally commissioned into the Sri Lanka Navy.
  - Bolanda Hakuru Meniyal, born on 4 June 1915, reaches 111 years. He is recognised as Sri Lanka's oldest living man by the National Secretariat for Elders.
- 9 June – The Colombo High Court convicts Sarana Gunawardena, former MP and deputy minister, on four indictments filed by the Commission to Investigate Allegations of Bribery or Corruption (CIABOC), alleging that he caused losses to the state while serving as chairman of the National Lotteries Board. He receives a sentence of four years' rigorous imprisonment for each indictment, to run concurrently, and a fine of Rs. 1.8 million (approximately US$5,345).
- 10 June – Shan Wijayalal De Silva, former Chief Minister of Southern Province and Member of Parliament, is arrested by the Commission to Investigate Allegations of Bribery or Corruption (CIABOC) over allegations of corruption amounting to Rs. 16.5 million (approximately US$48,910) in 2019 and procurement irregularities, and is remanded until 12 June by the Colombo Chief Magistrate's Court.
- 11 June
  - The Court of Appeal of Sri Lanka acquits Imiyage Don Vipula Hemantha Kumara, who was convicted of two counts of murder committed in 1995 and sentenced to death by the Gampaha High Court in November 2017, citing serious doubts about the reliability of the prosecution's identification evidence. Capital punishment in Sri Lanka has not been enforced since 23 June 1976.
  - Israel Aerospace Industries refurbish and upgrade five Kfir multirole combat aircraft of the Sri Lanka Air Force at a cost of US$50 million (approximately Rs. 16.8 billion).
- 16 June – Rumesh Tharanga wins the gold medal in the men's javelin throw at the 2026 Golden Spike Ostrava in Ostrava, Czech Republic, with a throw of 86.57 metres (284.0 ft).
- 17 June – Johann Peries successfully summits Denali, the highest mountain peak in North America, as part of the Seven Summits challenge. This marks his sixth of the seven continental peaks, leaving only Aconcagua in Argentina to complete the challenge.
- 19 June – Rumesh Tharanga wins the gold medal in the men's javelin throw at the 2026 Doha Diamond League in Doha, Qatar, the seventh leg of the 2026 Diamond League, with a throw of 88.68 metres (290.9 ft).
- 21 June
  - General Kevin Schneider, commander of the U.S. Pacific Air Forces, arrives in Sri Lanka on a three-day official visit.
  - The Financial Crimes Investigation Division arrests Jeffry Mohamed, the alleged leader of a money laundering operation suspected of illegally transferring over Rs. 21 billion (approximately US$63 million) out of the country.
- 22 June – S. Paul Kapur, United States Assistant Secretary of State for South and Central Asian Affairs, arrives in Sri Lanka on a three-day official visit.
- 23 June
  - The Ministry of Health issues new guidelines banning processed meats, sugar and salt-rich foods, carbonated soft drinks and high-sugar beverages from school canteens.
  - Ten Bell 206 TH-57 Sea Ranger helicopters, gifted by the United States under the Excess Defence Articles programme, are commissioned into service with the Sri Lanka Air Force.
- 27 June – Trinity College wins the 2026 Dialog Schools Rugby League, remaining undefeated throughout the season, retaining the title from the previous year, and completing the domestic double for 2026.
- 30 June – Rear Admiral Damian Fernando is appointed the 27th Commander of the Navy with effect from 1 July 2026 and is elevated to the rank of vice admiral.

=== July ===
- 2 July – The World Bank upgrades Sri Lanka's status to an upper-middle-income economy.
- 3 July – Admiral of the Fleet Wasantha Karannagoda, former Commander of the Sri Lanka Navy, is arrested by the Commission to Investigate Allegations of Bribery or Corruption (CIABOC) on charges of corruption in connection with an ongoing investigation into the recruitment of Yoshitha Rajapaksa into the Sri Lanka Navy without proper documentation in 2006.
- 5–6 July – A riot at Negombo Prison, an incarceration facility administered by the Department of Prisons, leaves 31 people dead and over 100 injured.
- 7 July – Professor Sir Nishan Canagarajah, Sri Lankan-born vice-chancellor of the University of Leicester, is knighted by King Charles III at an investiture ceremony held at Windsor Castle.
- 15 July – Sarath Abeykoon, governor of Central Province, states that he has tendered his resignation from the post of governor several days ago due to personal reasons and is currently awaiting a response from the president.
- 17 July
  - C. D. Wickramaratne, retired police officer and 35th Inspector General of Police (2020–2023), dies from a self-inflicted gunshot wound.
  - Manjot Kalra, former Indian cricketer and co-owner of Lanka Premier League franchise team Jaffna Kings, is arrested by the Special Investigations Unit for the Prevention of Offences Relating to Sports on allegations of bribing a player for ₹9.5 million (approximately US$28,700).
  - The 2026 Lanka Premier League commences, with Galle Gallants playing Jaffna Kings at the Sinhalese Sports Club Cricket Ground in Colombo.
- 24 July – The United States imposes a 10% tariff on Sri Lanka citing the presence of alleged forced labour in the supply chain.
- 27 July – Chrissy Houlahan, U.S. representative from Pennsylvania's 6th congressional district, visits Sri Lanka leading a congressional delegation.
- 31 July
  - Major General Nilantha Premaratne is appointed the 26th Commander of the Army with effect from 1 August 2026 and is elevated to the rank of lieutenant general.
  - Pujith Jayasundara, former Inspector General of Police, and Hemasiri Fernando, former secretary to the Ministry of Defence, are sentenced to death by the Permanent High Court Trial-at-Bar of Colombo for criminal negligence, dereliction of official duty, and aiding and abetting deaths by failing to take preventive action despite advance warnings of the 2019 Sri Lanka Easter bombings. Capital punishment in Sri Lanka has not been enforced since 23 June 1976.
  - Rumesh Tharanga wins the gold medal in the men's javelin throw at the 2026 Commonwealth Games in Glasgow, Scotland, with a throw of 89.75 metres (294.5 ft).

=== August ===
- 1 August – A riot at Mahara Prison, an incarceration facility administered by the Department of Prisons, leaves one inmate dead and six others injured.
- 4 August – Floods and mudslides caused by torrential rains leave seven people dead, injure many others, and cause property damage.
- 5 August
  - Vikram Misri, Foreign Secretary of India, arrives in Sri Lanka on an official visit.
  - Akila Viraj Kariyawasam, former Member of Parliament and cabinet minister, is arrested by the Commission to Investigate Allegations of Bribery or Corruption on corruption charges and is remanded until 18 August by the Colombo Chief Magistrate's Court.
  - Harsha Suranga Fernando is appointed as the 18th governor of the Central Province, following the resignation of previous governor, Sarath Abeykoon.
- 6 and 7 August – Riots at New Magazine Prison, Colombo, and Kuruwita Prison, incarceration facilities administered by the Department of Prisons, leave three inmates dead and 23 others injured.
- 10 August – Sagara Kariyawasam, a former Member of Parliament, is arrested by the Central Criminal Investigation Bureau (CCIB) of Sri Lanka Police over remarks he allegedly made against Inspector General of Police Priyantha Weerasooriya. He is subsequently released on bail by the Kaduwela Magistrate's Court.
- 15 August – A Sri Lanka Navy fast attack craft capsizes in the sea off Angulana, near Moratuwa. Eleven sailors are rescued, with one still missing.
- 21 August – Rumesh Tharanga wins the gold medal in the men's javelin throw at the 2026 Athletissima in Lausanne, Switzerland, the twelfth leg of the 2026 Diamond League, with a throw of 88.14 metres (289.2 ft).
- 25 August – A Cessna 152 (4R-DRA) belonging to a flight training school makes a hard landing at Ratmalana Airport, sustaining damage; the pilot escapes uninjured.
- 27 August – Rumesh Tharanga wins the gold medal in the men's javelin throw at the 2026 Weltklasse Zürich in Zurich, Switzerland, the fourteenth leg of the 2026 Diamond League, with a throw of 92.07 metres (302.1 ft).
- 31 August – Ravi Karunanayake, a Member of Parliament for the National List representing the New Democratic Front, is arrested by the Commission to Investigate Allegations of Bribery or Corruption (CIABOC) over allegations of corruption and causing a loss to the government. He is subsequently released on bail by the Colombo Magistrate's Court.

=== September ===
- 1 September – The Colombo High Court convicts Piyankara Jayaratne, former MP and minister, on two indictments filed by the Commission to Investigate Allegations of Bribery or Corruption (CIABOC), alleging corruption and causing losses to the state while serving as Minister of Civil Aviation. He receives a sentence of seven years' imprisonment for each indictment, to run concurrently, and a fine of Rs. 200,000 (approximately US$611).
- 2 September – Eraj Ravindra Fernando, politician and mayor of Hambantota Municipal Council (2014–2023), is found dead in a suspected act of suicide at an apartment in Bambalapitiya, Colombo.
- 5 September – Rumesh Tharanga wins the gold medal in the men's javelin throw at the 2026 Memorial Van Damme in Brussels, Belgium, the fifteenth and final leg of the 2026 Diamond League, with a throw of 89.04 metres (292.1 ft), becoming the first Sri Lankan athlete to win a Diamond League final.
- 8 September – Rajnath Singh, Minister of Defence of India, arrives in Sri Lanka on a three-day official visit.
- 10 September
  - Laura DiBella, chair of the U.S. Federal Maritime Commission, arrives in Sri Lanka on an official visit.
  - The Supreme Court overturns a pardon given by then-president Maithripala Sirisena to hardline Buddhist monk Galagoda Aththe Gnanasara, who had been sentenced to six years' imprisonment in 2018 for contempt of court and intimidating Sandya Eknaligoda, the wife of missing political cartoonist Prageeth Eknaligoda.
- 13 September – Rumesh Tharanga wins the gold medal in the men's javelin throw at the 2026 World Athletics Ultimate Championship in Budapest, Hungary, with a throw of 91.09 metres (298.9 ft).
- 14 September – Sri Lanka Muslim Congress (SLMC) MP Abdul Wazeeth resigns from his parliamentary seat.
- 22 September – The High Court convicts 15 defendants and acquits nine others on charges of involvement in the 2019 Sri Lanka Easter bombings.
- 24 September – Habeeb Rifan is sworn in as a Member of Parliament from the National list, replacing Abdul Wazeeth who had earlier resigned from his seat on 14 September.
- 25 September – Parliament passes the 22nd Amendment to the Constitution, with 158 members voting in favour and 63 against. The amendment raised the mandatory retirement age of Supreme Court judges from 65 to 67, and the retirement age of Court of Appeal judges from 63 to 65.
- 28 September – Rumesh Tharanga wins the gold medal in the men's javelin throw at the 2026 Asian Games in Nagoya, Japan, with a throw of 88.55 metres (290.5 ft).
- 29 September – Lieutenant General Joel B. Vowell, deputy commanding general of United States Army Pacific, arrives in Sri Lanka on an official visit.

=== October ===
- 7 October
  - Former first lady Shiranthi Rajapaksa is arrested as part of an investigation into the alleged misuse of 10 million rupees ($30,300) of donations collected by the Siriliya Saviya charity meant for the Lady Ridgeway Hospital for Children.
  - Mercedes-Benz Fashion Week Sri Lanka 2026 commences at the City of Dreams Sri Lanka, Colombo.
- 8 October – National People's Power (NPP) MP Chandana Sooriyaarachchi is arrested on suspicion of injuring a pedestrian in a traffic accident in Panagoda.
- 9 October – Greg Gianforte, governor of Montana, arrives in Sri Lanka on an official visit.
- 16 October – Kavantissa, an iconic tusker and Sri Lanka's tallest living elephant, dies from complications arising from a gunshot injury while receiving treatment in Galgamuwa. The elephant was named in honour of King Kavantissa.
- 17 October – Sri Lanka suffers an islandwide power outage lasting from around noon till evening.
- 19 October – China Merchants Port, the Sri Lanka Ports Authority and Access Engineering abandon the proposed US$392 million (approximately Rs. 130.2 billion) South Asia Commercial and Logistics Hub project at the Port of Colombo.
- 25 October – Sri Lanka rescues 40 Iranian sailors from merchant vessels in international waters near its coast after receiving a request from the Iranian embassy through diplomatic channels, citing medical emergencies.

=== November ===
- 6 November – A rainfall of 129 millimetres in one hour triggers a flash flood in Colombo, with the Colombo Municipal Council area worst affected.
- 9 November – Lahiru Achintha Gallage wins the silver medal in the men's 1500 metres at the 2026 Summer Youth Olympics in Dakar, Senegal.
- 10 November – A collision involving three buses on the A9 highway near the Rambewa-Weli Oya junction in Anuradhapura leaves five people dead and more than fifty injured.
- 11 November
  - Sri Lanka conducts its first autonomous passenger drone trial at Port City Colombo, using an E216 two-seater passenger drone manufactured by EHang.
  - J. P. Nadda, Minister of Health of India, arrives in Sri Lanka on an official visit.
- 16 November – Lakdhanavi Limited, operator of Lakdhanavi Power Station, signs an engineering, procurement, and construction (EPC) contract worth US$75 million (approximately Rs. 25 billion) to build a 57 MW gas-fired power plant at Hope Town, Port Blair, Andaman and Nicobar Islands, India.
- 20 November – The Central Bank of Sri Lanka raises interest rates by 25 basis points, the highest since July 2024, in addition to increasing the overnight policy rate from 8.75% to 9% with headline inflation projected to reach 9% by end-November.
- 21 November
  - Sihasak Phuangketkeow, deputy prime minister and Minister of Foreign Affairs of Thailand, arrives in Sri Lanka on a four-day official visit.
  - A diesel oil spill is caused by a rupture in a pipeline connected to a storage tank belonging to the Jaya Container Terminal at the Port of Colombo.

== Holidays ==
Sri Lankan Holidays in 2026
Maha Season (Northeast Monsoon)			First Inter-monsoon (from mid-March)	Yala Season (Southwest Monsoon) (from mid-April)					Second Inter-Monsoon (from mid-October)	Maha Season (Northeast Monsoon)	
January	February	March	April	May	June	July	August	September	October	November	December
2 Duruthu Full Moon Poya Day	1 Navam Full Moon Poya Day	3 Medin Full Moon Poya Day	1 Bak Full Moon Poya Day	1 May Day & Full Moon Poya Day	29; Poson Full Moon Poya Day	29; Esala Full Moon Poya Day	25; Milad un-Nabi	26; Binara Full Moon Poya Day	25; Vap Full Moon Poya Day	8 Deepavali	23; Unduvap Full Moon Poya Day
14; Thai Pongal	4 Independence Day	21; Eid al-Fitr	3 Good Friday	27; Id Ul-Alha			27; Nikini Full Moon Poya Day			24; Il Full Moon Poya Day	25; Christmas
		15; Maha Shivaratri Day	13; Day prior to Sinhalese & Tamil New Year Day	30; Vesak Full Moon Poya Day							
			14; Sinhalese & Tamil New Year Day	31; Day following Vesak Full Moon Poya Day							

== Deaths ==
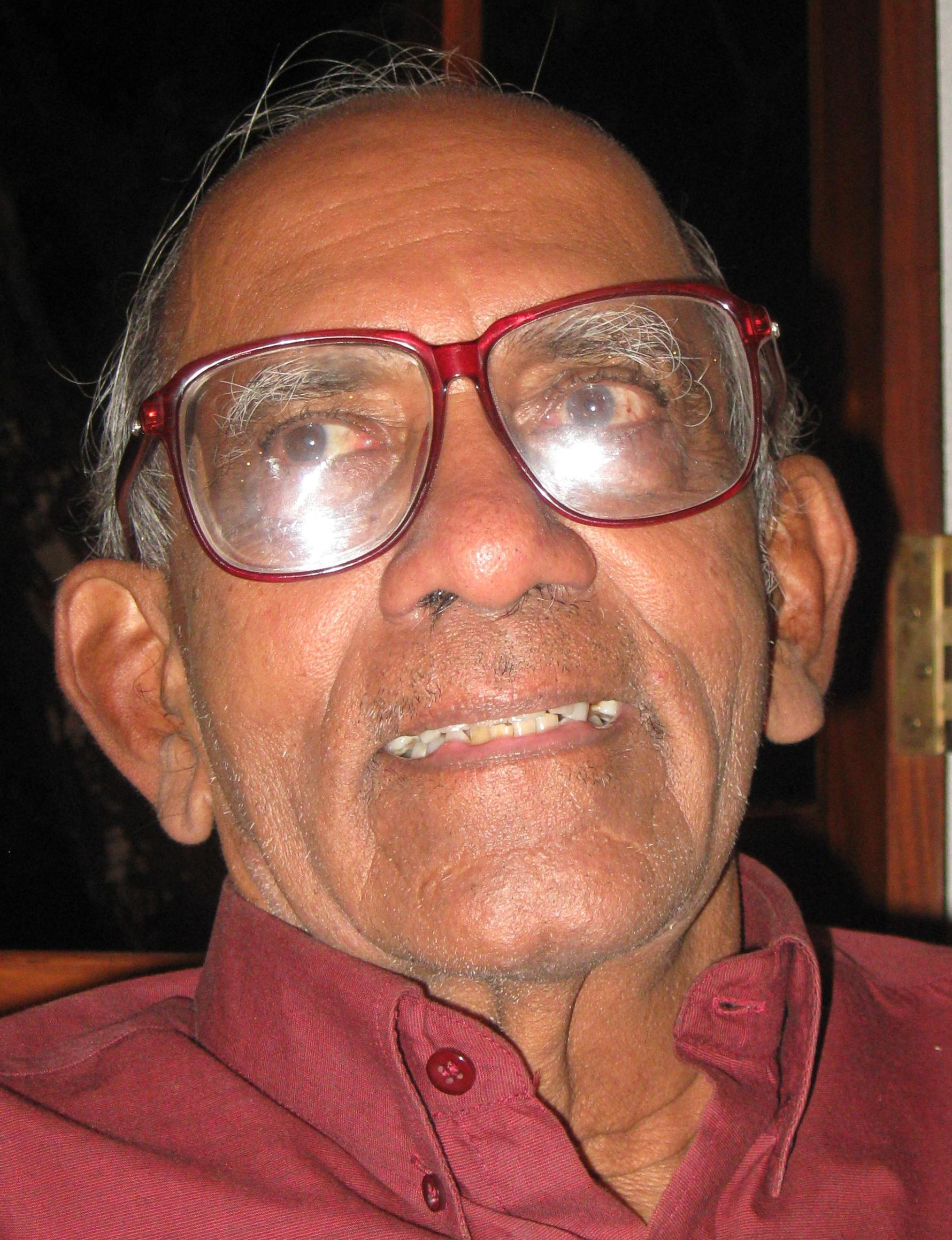
Nihal Seneviratne (b. 1934)

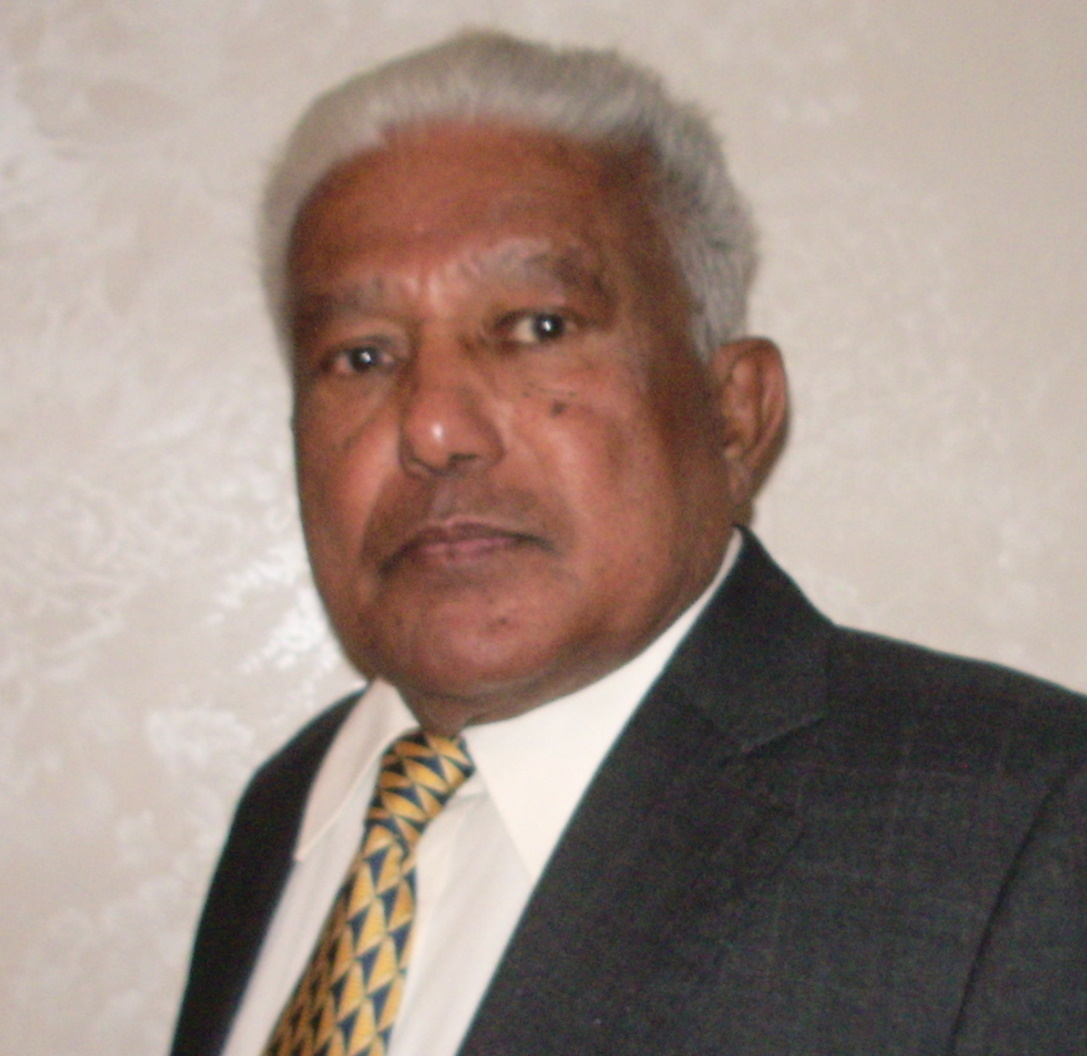
Y. Karunadasa (b. 1934)

Sirisumana Godage (b. 1936)

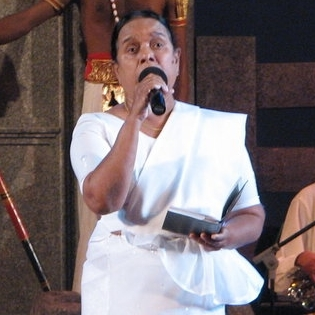
Nanda Malini (b. 1943)

=== January ===
- 4 January – Chandrasena Thalangama, 81, journalist and lyricist.
- 6 January – Nihal Seneviratne, 91, civil servant, secretay general of the Parliament of Sri Lanka (1981–1994).
- 10 January – Darshana Handungoda, 55, political journalist and YouTuber.
- 13 January – Iqbal Athas, 81, journalist.
- 15 January – Raju Bandara, 65, singer and musician.
- 18 January – Nandana Gunathilake, 63, politician, MP (2000–2010).
- 28 January – Koyan Chamitha, 28, naval officer, first Sri Lankan to successfully complete the Basic Underwater Demolition/SEAL (BUD/S) training conducted by the United States Navy (USN).
- 29 January – Sena Samarasinghe, 89, film director.

=== February ===
- 1 February – Bandula Harishchandra, 86, artist.
- 13 February – Tissa Vitharana, 91, politician, cabinet minister, governor, MP (2004–2015, 2020–2024).
- 21 February – Sunil Fernando, 81, cricket coach.
- 23 February – Raja de Silva, 102, scientist, archaeologist, Commissioner of Archaeology (1967–1979).
- 26 February – Kithsiri Perera, 97, actor.

=== March ===
- 3 March – S. K. Sangakkara, attorney-at-law, father of Sri Lankan cricketer Kumar Sangakkara.
- 5 March – Eric Abeywardena, actor.
- 7 March – Rajitha Rodrigo, actor.
- 22 March – Aloysius Pieris, 91, Jesuit priest and theologian.
- 30 March – Rezvi Sheriff, 77, academic, nephrologist and physician.
- 31 March – Lionel Fernando, 86, cricketer (Ceylon, Walsden Cricket Club).

=== April ===
- 2 April
  - Mahinda Wijesekara, 83, politician, cabinet minister and MP.
  - Dan Piachaud, 89, cricketer (Oxford University, MCC, national team).
- 3 April – Bhakti Dharmapriya Mendis, 47, journalist, founding editorial board member of Lakbima newspaper.
- 6 April – Subashini Balasubramaniyam, 36, actress.
- 15 April – Charles Lakshan, 44, singer.
- 26 April – Y. Karunadasa, 92, Buddhist scholar.
- 29 April – Deshabandhu Sirisumana Godage, 90, entrepreneur, book publisher and chairman of Godage International Publishers.
- 30 April – Mahesh Jayasinghe, 66, actor.

=== May ===
- 7 May – Suda Wannila Aththo, 62, Rathugala indigenous leader.
- 8 May – Kapila Chandrasena, 61, airline and telecommunications executive, CEO of SriLankan Airlines, Mihin Lanka and Mobitel.
- 13 May – M. P. Jayasinghe, 81, lawyer, politician, and governor of Uva (2015–2018) and North Central (2018) provinces.
- 17 May – D. B. S. Jeyaraj, 71, journalist, political commentator and Sri Lanka correspondent for The Hindu.
- 22 May – Anura Dassanayake, 64, singer.
- 31 May – Chandrasoma Perera, 82, educator, founder of Sathara Group.

=== June ===
- 1 June – H. U. Silva, 73, naval officer, sports administrator, president of the Sri Lanka Archery Association (2019–2022).
- 6 June – Ramya Sanath Amaraweera Wickramasingha, industrialist, chairman of CBL Group.
- 13 June – W. G. Ariyasena, 74, army officer, athlete, sports administrator.
- 26 June – Saman Almeida, 60, actor.
- 29 June – Rukman Asitha, 48, singer.

=== July ===
- 1 July – Gamini Samarakoon, 77, actor.
- 2 July – Nihal Sri Ameresekere, 78, litigation consultant.
- 10 July – Mariazelle Goonetilleke, 68, singer and musician.
- 13 July – Punchage Kalumenike, 114, Sri Lanka's oldest woman, born 4 July 1912.
- 17 July – C. D. Wickramaratne, 63, police officer, 35th Inspector General of Police (2020–2023).
- 25 July – Upali Dharmadasa, 71, former president of Sri Lanka Cricket.

=== August ===
- 6 August – Wimal Dissanayake, 86, writer, literary critic and scholar.
- 18 August – Ven. Rambukana Siddhartha Thero, 76, Buddhist monk and lyricist.
- 20 August – Nanda Malini, 82, singer and musician.
- 24 August – Cletus Chandrasiri Perera, 78, Roman Catholic prelate, bishop of Ratnapura (2007–2024).
- 31 August – Chula Padmendra Kumarapathirana, 46, model, catwalk and pageant trainer.

=== September ===
- 1 September – Priyankara Perera, 64, singer, musician and actor
- 2 September – Eraj Ravindra Fernando, 57, politician, mayor of Hambantota Municipal Council (2014–2023).
- 10 September – Manel Abeysekera, 93, diplomat.
- 14 September – Daya Nellampitiya, 91, singer, musician, dance instructor.

=== October ===
- 18 October – Ven. Kappetiyagoda Sirivimala Thero, 96, deputy chief prelate of the Ramanna Nikaya, chief incumbent of Getambe Rajopavanaramaya in Kandy.
- 31 October – Lal Wijenayake, 85, lawyer, left-wing politician.

=== November ===
- 14 November – M. K. Shivajilingam, 69, politician, MP (2001–2010), chairman of Valvettithurai Urban Council (2025–2026).
- 15 November – Chandra Malini Rajapaksa, 75, wife of Chamal Rajapaksa and mother of Shasheendra Rajapaksa.
