= List of state visits received by Anura Kumara Dissanayake =

This is a list of high level state and diplomatic visits by countries and international organisations to Sri Lanka during the presidency of Anura Kumara Dissanayake, who has served in this position since 23 September 2024.

== Summary ==
As of July 2026, Anura Kumara Dissanayake has received 26 state visits from 13 countries and 4 intergovernmental organizations.

No. of visits	Country
6	India
3	United States
2	Australia, China
1	Asian Development Bank, European Union, Holy See, Indonesia, International Monetary Fund, Italy, Maldives, New Zealand, Russia, South Africa, United Kingdom, United Nations, Vietnam

== 2024 ==
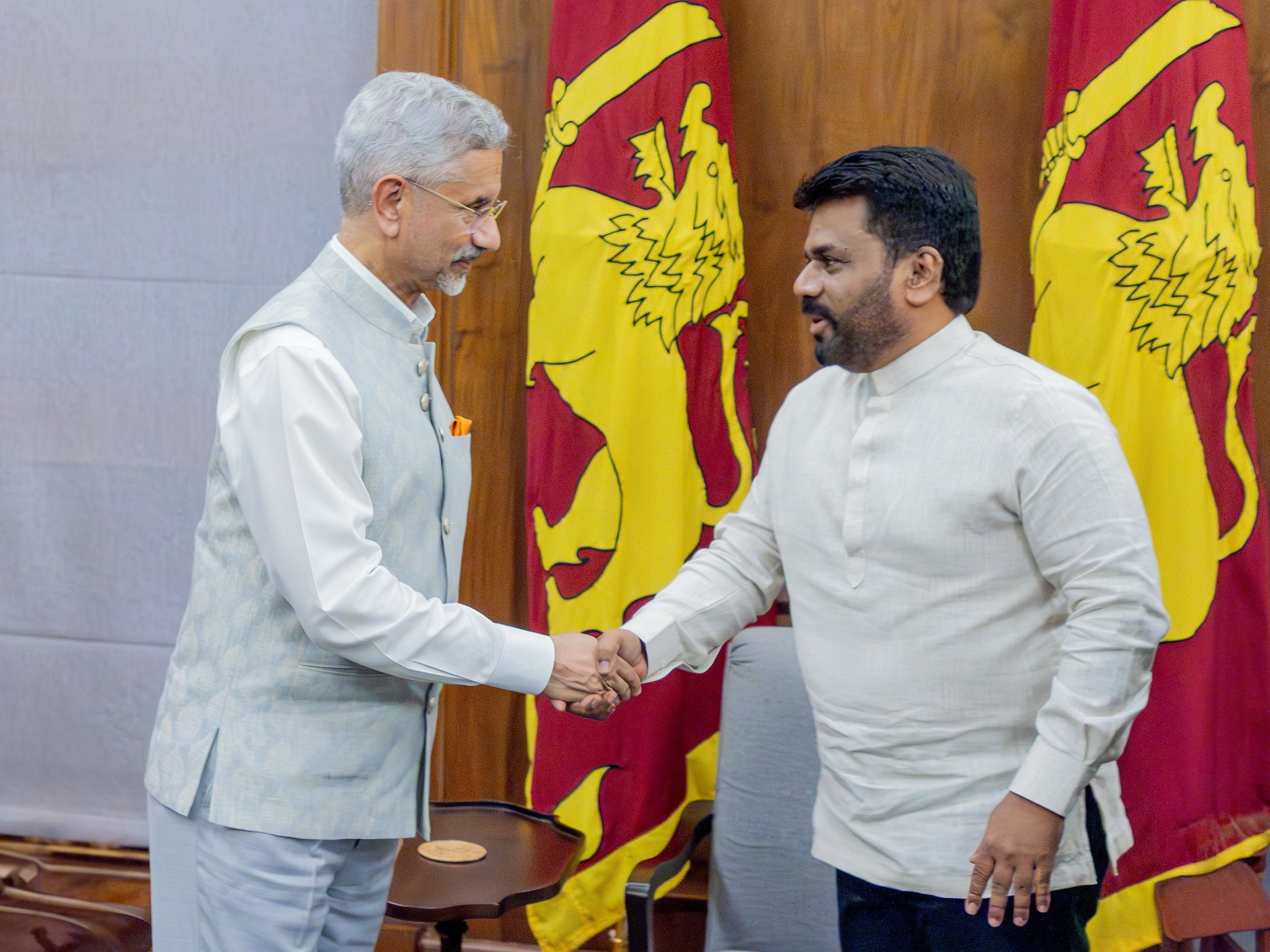
President Anura Kumara Dissanayake receives External Affairs Minister, Dr. S. Jaishankar, October 2024

No.	Country	Guest(s)	Date(s)	Purpose(s)	Notes
1	India	Minister of External Affairs S. Jaishankar	4 October	Official visit	See also: India–Sri Lanka relations Met with President Anura Kumara Dissanayake, Prime Minister Harini Amarasuriya, and Foreign Minister Vijitha Herath.

== 2025 ==
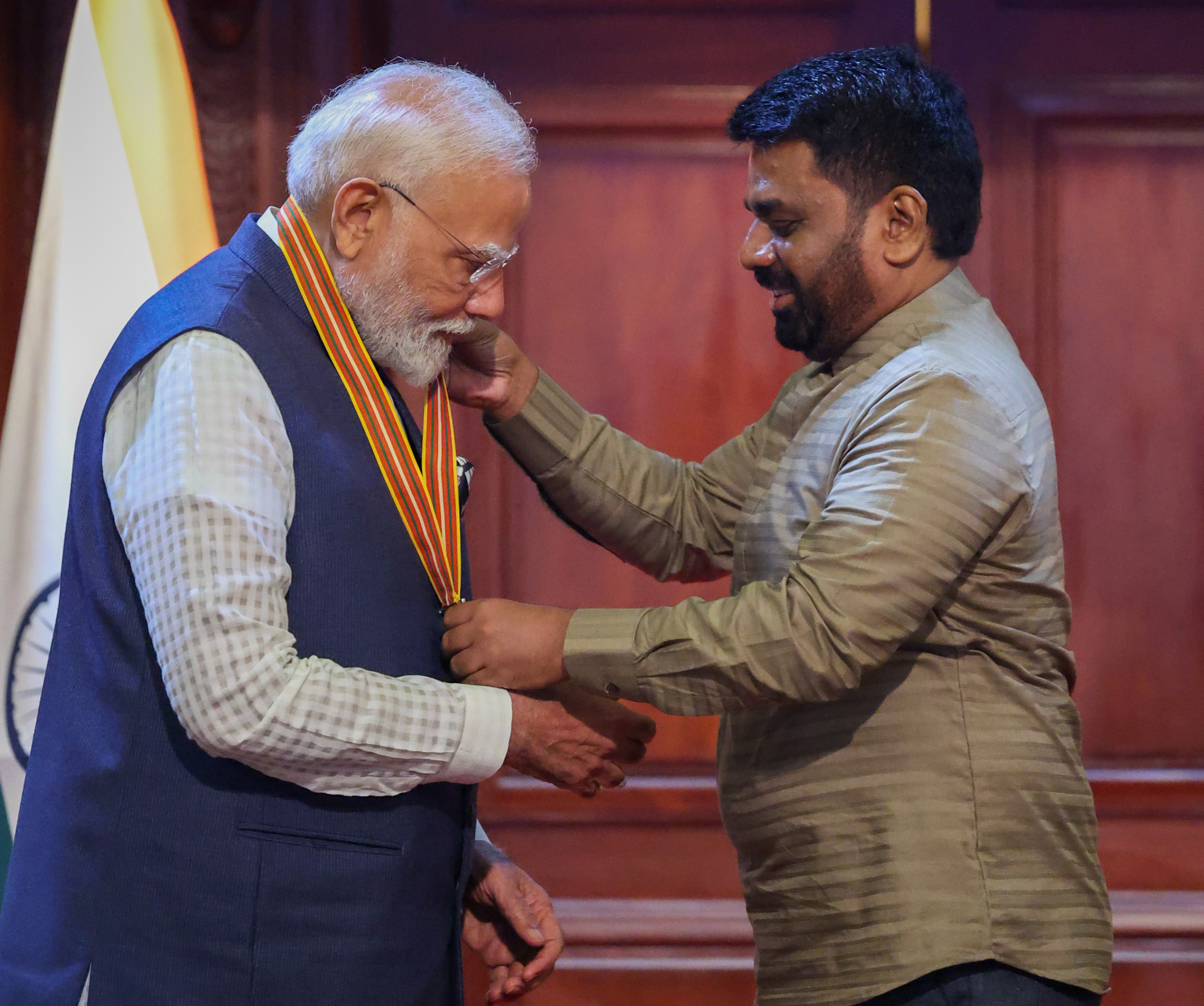
Prime Minister Narendra Modi receives Sri Lanka Mitra Vibhushana, the highest civilian honour of Sri Lanka for foreign dignitaries, from President Anura Kumara Dissanayake, April 2025

No.	Country	Guest(s)	Date(s)	Purpose(s)	Notes
2	India	Prime Minister Narendra Modi and Minister of External Affairs S. Jaishankar	4–6 April	State visit	See also: India–Sri Lanka relations To strengthen energy and defence ties and investment opportunities with Sri Lanka.
3	New Zealand	Deputy Prime Minister and Minister of Foreign Affairs Winston Peters	24–28 May	Official visit	See also: New Zealand–Sri Lanka relations Met with Sri Lankan President Anura Kumara Dissanayake, Prime Minister Harini Amarasuriya and Foreign Minister Vijitha Herath; marking the second visit by a New Zealand foreign minister since 2013.
4	European Union	Minister of Foreign Affairs Radosław Sikorski	28–31 May	Official visit	Radosław Sikorski representing Kaja Kallas, the vice-president of the European Commission and high representative of the union for foreign affairs and security policy. The visit also coincides with Poland's current presidency of the council of the European Union.
5	Australia	Deputy Prime Minister and Defence Minister Richard Marles	3–4 June	Official visit	See also: Australia–Sri Lanka relations Two day official visit.
6	United Nations	United Nations High Commissioner for Human Rights Volker Türk	23–26 June	Official visit	Three-day official visit.
7	South Africa	Former President of South Africa Thabo Mbeki	26–29 June	Official visit	See also: Sri Lanka–South Africa relations Arrives in Sri Lanka on a public engagement visit.
8	Australia	Governor-General of Australia Samantha Mostyn	6–9 August	Official visit	See also: Australia–Sri Lanka relations Three-day official visit.
9	Italy	Undersecretary of the Ministry of Foreign Affairs Maria Tripodi	3–6 September	Official visit	See also: Italy–Sri Lanka relations Three-day official visit.
10	India	Chief of the Naval Staff Admiral Dinesh Kumar Tripathi	22–25 September	Official visit	See also: India–Sri Lanka relations Four-day official visit.
11	Holy See	Secretary for Relations with States Archbishop Paul Gallagher	3–8 November	Official visit	See also: Holy See–Sri Lanka relations Five-day official visit.
12	United States	Under Secretary of State for Political Affairs Allison Hooker	11–12 December	Official visit	See also: Sri Lanka–United States relations Official visit.
13	China	Vice Chairperson of the Standing Committee of the National People's Congress Wang Dongming	16–18 December	Official visit	See also: China–Sri Lanka relations Three-day official visit.
14	India	Minister of External Affairs S. Jaishankar	22–23 December	Official visit	See also: India–Sri Lanka relations Met with Sri Lankan Foreign Minister Vijitha Herath. Addressed the devastation caused by Cyclone Ditwah.
15	China	Party Secretary of Tibet of the Chinese Communist Party Wang Junzheng	23–26 December	Official visit	See also: China–Sri Lanka relations Three-day official visit.

== 2026 ==
No.	Country	Guest(s)	Date(s)	Purpose(s)	Notes
16	India	Chief of the Army Staff (COAS) of the Indian Army General Upendra Dwivedi	7–9 January	Official visit	See also: India–Sri Lanka relations Two-day official visit.
17	International Monetary Fund	Managing director of the International Monetary Fund Kristalina Georgieva	16–18 February	Official visit	See also: Sri Lanka and the International Monetary Fund Three-day official visit.
18	United Kingdom	Deputy Prime Minister, Secretary of State for Justice and Lord Chancellor David Lammy	17 February	Official visit	See also: Sri Lanka–United Kingdom relations Official visit.
19	United States	Commander of the United States Pacific Fleet Admiral Stephen Koehler	19 February	Official visit	See also: Sri Lanka–United States relations Official visit.
20	United States	United States Ambassador to India and Special Envoy for South and Central Asian Affairs Sergio Gor	19–24 March	Official visit	See also: Sri Lanka–United States relations Official visit.
21	Asian Development Bank	President of the Asian Development Bank Masato Kanda	23–26 April	Official visit	Official visit.
22	India	Vice President C. P. Radhakrishnan	19–20 April	Official visit	See also: India–Sri Lanka relations Met with President Anura Kumara Dissanayake.
23	Indonesia	Deputy Ministry of Foreign Affairs Anis Matta	23–25 April	Official visit	See also: Indonesia–Sri Lanka relations Visited at the invitation of Deputy Minister of Foreign Affairs and Foreign Employment Arun Hemachandra.
24	Maldives	President Mohamed Muizzu	3–6 May	State visit	See also: Maldives–Sri Lanka relations Official visit at the invitation of Sri Lankan President Anura Kumara Dissanayake. Conducted bilateral discussions and witnessed the signing of several MoUs between Sri Lanka and the Maldives.
25	Russia	Minister of Health Mikhail Murashko	4–7 May	Official visit	A high-level delegation led by Mikhail Murashko visited for a three-day official visit.
26	Vietnam	General Secretary and President Tô Lâm	7–8 May	State visit	State visit at the invitation of President Anura Kumara Dissanayake.

== See also ==
- Foreign relations of Sri Lanka
- List of international presidential trips made by Anura Kumara Dissanayake
