= Iran and the International Monetary Fund =

Iran and the International Monetary Fund have been in partnership since 1945. Iran has gone to the IMF on only two occasions, both before the 1979 revolution of Iran.

== History of Iran and the IMF ==
The state of Iran joined the IMF on 29 December 1945. There have been two occasions during which Iran used IMF funding. The first stand-by arrangement occurred on 18 May 1956 where the IMF approved a 17.50 special drawing rights (SDR) million loan package. Iran used the entirety of the offered loan. The second stand-by arrangement the IMF approved of for Iran occurred on October 10, 1960. The amount approved was 35 SDR million; however Iran chose to draw only 22.50 SDR million of the available loan. Iran has no outstanding loans or purchases with the IMF.

== Iran and the IMF present day ==
As of 2019, Iran's SDR is 1549.18 million and its remaining callable capital brings Iran to its IMF quota of 3567.1 million SDR. Iran is one of the two largest economies in the Middle East & North Africa (MENA) region, trailing only behind the economy of Saudi Arabia and in population only to Egypt. Due to these socioeconomic factors, Iran has significant power in the IMF in its grouping. Iran holds the executive directorship in its grouping; the other countries in Iran's group are Afghanistan, Algeria, Ghana, Libya, Morocco, Pakistan, and Tunisia. The total voting power (% of total IMF funding) Iran's IMF group is 2.54, where Iran carries the most individual votes having 37,136 votes of the 128,046 votes in its grouping. Although the Islamic Republic of Iran carries the overall vote for its group in the board of directors meeting, its power does not go far in comparison to that of the United States (16.52% of the total fund). The voting bloc of the United States, Japan, UK, France, and Germany along with the other European Union directors makes it nearly impossible for the economic policies of Iran to be implemented in an effective manner.

== The IMF in conflict with Iran ==
Sanctions against Iran have hampered the growth the nation was seeing since the nuclear deal was in place in 2015. Compared to 2017/18, 2018/19's fiscal year has seen a 9.5% drop in gross domestic product and a 37.5% inflation hike due to the restricting economic environment that was created by policies of US President Donald Trump. The tightened economy has led the IMF to recommend through its many policy memos that Iran raise its price of barrels of oil to $194.60. The domestic economy is projected to go from 2019/20 the fiscal year $60.3 billion in goods and services to $55.5 billion in the 2020/21 fiscal year. The Organization of the Petroleum Exporting Countries is expected to increase its deficit of 4.5% in 2019/20 to 5.1% in 2020/21 in large part due to the restrictions on Iran's economy. The IMF implements its policies through the use of a conditionality, but since Iran has not used the fund to borrow since 1960, it can only send policy memos. In the 2018 Article IV Consultation Iran, the fund dictates the manners in which the country can fix its economy through restructuring the banks and political infrastructure. The political reforms the IMF recommends will in turn help solve the increasing unemployment of its youth in the country.
