= Sri Lanka and the International Monetary Fund =

Sri Lanka & IMF Overview
- Country Population: 22.037 million
- Date of Membership: 29 August 1950
- Latest Article IV/Country Report: 13 June 2024
- Special Drawing Rights (SDR): 0.24 million
- Quota (SDR): 578.8 million
- Number of Arrangements: 17
- Outstanding Purchases and Loans (SDR): 1,351.45 million (30 June 2024)
- Sri Lanka's Resident Representative: Sarwat Jahan

Sri Lanka joined the International Monetary Fund on August 29, 1950. Since June 1965, Sri Lanka has taken 16 loans from the IMF, with a total value of 3,586,000,000 SDR's. The most recent of these loans was agreed to in June 2016, with an agreed total of 1,070,780 SDR's, and 715,230,000 SDR's being withdrawn. Of this total, 715,230,000 SDR's remain outstanding. Notwithstanding the receipt of substantial soft loans from China, the island nation of Sri Lanka finds itself ensnared in a foreign currency crisis, prompting concerns among experts that it may be driven towards default. The current year places a heavy burden on Sri Lanka, with debt repayments amounting to approximately $4.5 billion, commencing with an initial payment of $500 million towards an international sovereign bond. Sri Lanka holds a position of significant importance in China's ambitious Belt and Road Initiative.

== Constituency ==
Sri Lanka is a part of a constituency with Bangladesh, Bhutan, and India. The representative of this constituency on the IMF executive board is Surjit Singh Bhalla. This constituency has 3.05% of the total voting power of the IMF. Individually, Sri Lanka has 7,247 total votes, or .15% of the total voting power of the IMF. Sri Lanka's current IMF quota is 578.6 million SDR's.

== History ==
=== 2016-2019 IMF intervention ===
In 2016, Sri Lanka began an adjustment program, supported under the Extended Fund Facility. The Extended Fund Facility supported agreement expired in June 2020. While foreign exchange reserve levels did recover from 2016 to 2019, reserves have declined sharply since the onset of the COVID-19 pandemic. Similarly, Sri Lanka's current account balance briefly improved, but as of 2022, returned to exhibiting a large deficit.

As per the IMF's statement, India has firmly pledged its commitment to aiding its distressed neighbor, Sri Lanka, in reducing its debt burden through a potential International Monetary Fund-backed initiative. The successful resolution with the IMF holds utmost importance for Sri Lanka's journey to recover from its most severe financial crisis in the past seventy years, highlighting the crucial role played by India's support. The longstanding friendship between India and Sri Lanka further fortifies the bedrock of this collaborative endeavor.

=== 2019-present economic and political crisis ===
Amidst the country's current foreign exchange crisis, former Sri Lankan President Gotabaya Rajapaksa sought a $3 Billion loan from the IMF in April 2022. Opposition party leaders urged Rajapaksa to seek IMF assistance prior to April. The governor of the country's central bank, P Nandalal Weeresignhe, echoed this sentiment. Sri Lanka has also sought an additional $500 million line of credit from India, and began negotiating a credit line of $1.5 billion. Sri Lankan minister of finance Ali Sabry has stated "We are a neutral country. We are a friend to all." In May 2022, Sri Lanka defaulted on its debt for the first time in the country's history.

Negotiations between the IMF and Sri Lanka regarding lending to resolve the balance of payments crisis are ongoing. As of July 18, 2022 acting president Ranil Wickremesignhe stated that negotiations were nearing conclusion.

Controversy

Washington Post columnist Ishaan Tharoor argues that the decision of the Rajapaksa government to accept a $3 billion line of credit from China to facilitate repayment of existing debts was an important factor in the development of the current crisis. Tharoor argues that rather than focus on long-term debt restructuring that may have resolved Sri Lanka's balance of payments crisis, Sri Lanka opted to pursue easy credit, resulting in eventual failure to repay outstanding loans. The article identifies this line of credit as a part of a broader trend referred to as debt trap diplomacy.

== Article IV consultations ==
The 2021 article IV consultation for Sri Lanka was published in March 2022. The consultation warned of a rising current account deficit, referring to Sri Lanka's foreign exchange reserve levels as "critically low". Executive directors praised Sri Lanka's COVID-19 policy response and vaccination drive, but argued that Sri Lanka's public debt was unsustainable. The executive directors recommended an increase in the income tax rate and value added tax, among other fiscal policy reforms, and cost-recovery energy pricing. The report also raised concerns about rising inflation, arguing that a tighter monetary policy response would be necessary. Additionally, executive directors stressed the importance of long-term structural adjustments to increase female labor force participation, reduce youth unemployment, diversify the economy, and fight corruption.

== List of Loan Agreements ==
History of Lending Commitments
No.	Facility	Date of Arrangement	Expiration Date	Amount Agreed, 000’ SDRs (USD Millions)	Amount Drawn (%)	Amount Outstanding
1	SBA	15 June 1965	14 June 1966	30,000 (30)	22,500 (75%)	0
2	SBA	15 June 1966	14 June 1967	25,000 (25)	25,000 (100%)	0
3	SBA	6 May 1968	5 May 1969	19,500 (20)	19,500 (100%)	0
4	SBA	12 August 1969	11 August 1970	19,500 (20)	19,500 (100%)	0
5	SBA	18 March 1971	17 March 1972	24,500 (25)	24,500 (100%)	0
6	SBA	30 April 1974	29 April 1975	24,500 (30)	7,000 (29%)	0
7	SBA	2 December 1977	1 December 1978	93,000 (112)	93,000 (100%)	0
8	EFF	1 January 1979	31 December 1981	260,300 (336)	260,300 (100%)	0
9	SBA	14 September 1983	31 July 1984	100,000 (105)	50,000 (50%)	0
10	SAFC	9 March 1988	8 March 1991	156,170 (214)	156,170 (100%)	0
11	ECF	13 September 1991	31 July 1995	336,000 (455)	280,000 (83%)	0
12	SBA	20 April 2001	19 September 2002	200,000 (254)	200,000 (100%)	0
13	EFF	18 April 2003	17 April 2006	144,400 (198)	20,670 (14%)	0
14	ECF	18 April 2003	17 April 2006	269,000 (368)	38,390 (14%)	0
15	SBA	24 July 2009	23 July 2012	1,653,600 (2,566)	1,653,600 (100%)	0
16	EFF	3 June 2016	2 June 2019	1,070,780 (1,507)	715,230 (50%)	715,230
Total (as of 30 September 2018)				4,426,250	3,585,360	715,230
17	EFF	20 March 2023	20 March 2025	2,286,000 (~3,000)	2,286,000 (395%)	

== See also ==
- Economy of Sri Lanka
- Sri Lanka and the World Bank
