= Sirimevan =

Sirimevan is a given name. Notable people with the name include:

- Sirisumana Godage (born 1936), Sri Lankan entrepreneur
- Sirimevan Ranasinghe, Sri Lankan admiral
- Sirimevan Rodrigo (1933–2021), Sri Lankan Buddhist monk
