= Ameresekere =

Ameresekere is a surname. Notable people with the surname include:

- Asitha Ameresekere (born 1971), British-Sri Lankan film-maker and writer
- Nihal Sri Ameresekere (born 1947), Sri Lankan accountant, author, and public-interest activist
