= 2027 in Sri Lanka =

- Decades: 2000s; 2010s; 2020s
- See also: Other events of 2027; Timeline of Sri Lankan history

The following lists notable events that will occur and take place during 2027 in Sri Lanka.

== Events ==
=== Predicted and scheduled events ===
- 14–17 January – Sri Lanka Expo at the Bandaranaike Memorial International Conference Hall, Colombo. Originally scheduled for 18–21 June 2026.

== Holidays ==
Source: Ministry of Public Administration, Provincial Councils, and Local Government.

- 15 January – Thai Pongal
- 22 January – Duruthu Full Moon Poya Day
- 4 February – Independence Day
- 20 February – Navam Full Moon Poya Day
- 6 March – Maha Shivaratri Day
- 10 March – Eid al-Fitr
- 22 March – Medin Full Moon Poya Day
- 26 March – Good Friday
- 13 April – Day prior to Sinhalese and Tamil New Year Day
- 14 April – Sinhalese and Tamil New Year Day
- 20 April – Bak Full Moon Poya Day
- 1 May – May Day
- 17 May – Id Ul-Alha
- 19 May – Vesak Full Moon Poya Day
- 20 May – Day following Vesak Full Moon Poya Day
- 18 June – Poson Full Moon Poya Day
- 18 July – Esala Full Moon Poya Day
- 15 August – Milad un-Nabi
- 16 August – Nikini Full Moon Poya Day
- 15 September – Binara Full Moon Poya Day
- 15 October – Vap Full Moon Poya Day
- 28 October – Deepavali
- 13 November – Il Full Moon Poya Day
- 13 December – Unduvap Full Moon Poya Day
- 25 December – Christmas Day
