= Kapila Chandrasena =

Sri Lankan airline and telecommunications executive (1964–2026)

Kapila Chandrasena (Sinhala: කපිල චන්ද්‍රසේන; December 1964 – 8 May 2026) was a Sri Lankan airline and telecommunications executive. He was the CEO of SriLankan Airlines until 9 March 2015. Prior to this role, he was the CEO of Mihin Lanka and Mobitel. He also was the chief marketing officer of Sri Lanka Telecom.

== Early life and education ==
Kapila Chandrasena was born in December 1964. He studied at Royal College, Colombo, and obtained a Bachelor of Engineering from the University of Chicago and a Master of Business Administration from the University of Melbourne.

== Controversy ==
Chandrasena and his wife are alleged to have been involved in a US$2 million bribe in purchasing aircraft for SriLankan Airlines, and subsequent money laundering by transfer to an Australian bank. In February 2020, a warrant was issued by the Sri Lankan Law Enforcement Authority for the arrest of Chandrasena and his wife. He was subsequently released on bail.

The allegations were proved in an approved judgement delivered on 31 January 2020 by the Southwark Crown Court, in the case between Director of the Serious Fraud Office vs. Airbus SE. The bribe of US$2 million has been listed as Count 2: Sri Lanka.

On 12 March 2026, Chandrasena was arrested by the Commission to Investigate Allegations of Bribery or Corruption (CIABOC) in connection with investigations into the controversial Airbus deal and was remanded by the Colombo Magistrate's court. He was subsequently granted bail on 5 May 2026. However, after the court determined that Chandrasena had violated bail conditions following a complaint made by CIABOC, the Colombo Chief Magistrate issued a warrant for his arrest on 7 May 2026 to return him to custody.

== Death ==
Chandrasena was found dead at his home in Kollupitiya, Colombo, on 8 May 2026, at the age of 61. In a report to the Fort Magistrate's Court, the Sri Lanka Police stated that the incident was being treated as a suspicious death and that further investigations were underway.
