= Eraj Ravindra Fernando =

Sri Lankan politician (1968–2026)

- එරාජ් රවීන්ද්‍ර ප්‍රනාන්දු

Mayor of Hambantota Municipal Council
- In office 2014–2023

Personal details
- Born: 11 November 1968 Dominion of Ceylon
- Died: 2 September 2026 (aged 57) Bambalapitiya, Colombo, Sri Lanka
- Party: United People's Freedom Alliance
- Occupation: Politician

Eraj Ravindra Fernando (Sinhala: එරාජ් රවීන්ද්‍ර ප්‍රනාන්දු; 11 November 1968 – 2 September 2026) was a Sri Lankan politician who served as the mayor of the Hambantota Municipal Council from 2014 to 2023.

== Life and career ==
Eraj Ravindra Fernando was born on 11 November 1968. He was educated at Nalanda College, Colombo.

In April 2014, a group of five United National Party politicians were allegedly attacked by local residents whilst visiting the Mattala Rajapaksa International Airport on a fact-finding tour. In August 2019, Fernando was found guilty of threatening the politicians with a firearm and was sentenced to five years imprisonment. In October 2019, he was granted bail by the Hambantota High Court. Fernando was seeking a review of his conviction in the Court of Appeal.

Fernando was found dead from a suspected suicide in an apartment in Bambalapitiya on 2 September 2026, at the age of 57.
