= List of international prime ministerial trips made by Harini Amarasuriya =

Harini Amarasuriya has served as the 16th Prime Minister of Sri Lanka since 25 September 2024. This article documents all international prime ministerial trips made by Amarasuriya during her term in office.

== Summary of international trips ==
As of November 2026, Harini Amarasuriya has made 11 foreign trips to 11 countries.

No. of visits	Country
1	Canada, China, France, India, Philippines, Switzerland, Thailand, United Kingdom, Qatar, Bhutan, Antigua and Barbuda

== 2025 ==
No.	Country	Areas visited	Date(s)	Purpose(s)	Notes	Ref.
1	France	Paris	31 March – 1 April	State visit	Took part in the high-level segment of the International Expert Conference, held at the UNESCO Headquarters.	
2	Thailand	Bangkok	3–4 April	6th BIMSTEC Summit	Met with Indian Prime Minister Narendra Modi and other BIMSTEC leaders.	
3	Canada	Vancouver	24–26 June	Commonwealth of Learning Board of Governors Meeting	Participated as the representative of the South Asian region.	
4	China	Beijing	12–15 October	Global Leaders' Meeting on Women	Delivered a speech at the summit jointly organised by China and UN Women. Met with President Xi Jinping, Prime Minister Li Qiang and Chairman of the CPPCC Wang Huning.	
5	India	New Delhi	16–18 October	NDTV World Summit 2025	Visited Hindu College, Delhi. Met with Prime Minister Narendra Modi. Delivered the keynote address at the summit and participated alongside Narendra Modi and former prime ministers Rishi Sunak and Tony Abbott.	

== 2026 ==
No.	Country	Areas visited	Date(s)	Purpose(s)	Notes	Ref.
6	Switzerland	Davos	19–23 January	World Economic Forum (WEF) annual meeting 2026	Led the Sri Lankan delegation to the meeting and held several bilateral meetings with world leaders, heads of international financial institutions and leading global business figures. Met with UK Foreign Secretary and the Secretary of State for Education	
7	Philippines	Manila	9–12 March	Asian Development Bank (ADB) International Women's Day 2026	Represented Sri Lanka and delivered a keynote address. Held bilateral meetings with Masato Kanda, president of the Asian Development Bank, and other political leaders.	
8	United Kingdom	London	18–23 May	22nd Annual Commonwealth Education Forum; 43rd Commonwealth of Learning Board of Governors Meeting	Visited University of Sussex and addressed the 60th anniversary celebrations. Delivered the annual lecture at St Antony's College, Oxford. Met with Yvette Cooper, Bridget Phillipson and Shirley Ayorkor Botchwey. Participated in the education forum and board of governors meeting.	
9	Qatar	Doha	14–16 July	Funeral of Hamad bin Khalifa Al Thani, Emir of Qatar (1995–2013)	To pay final respects to late Hamad bin Khalifa Al Thani and convey official condolences of the government.	
10	Bhutan	Paro	31 August – 4 September	Global Conscious Food Systems Summit 2026	Participated in the inaugural summit representing Sri Lanka and deliverd a keynote address. Held bilateral meetings with King Jigme Khesar Namgyel Wangchuck, Prime Minister Tshering Tobgay and other dignitaries.	
11	Antigua and Barbuda	St. John's	31 October – 6 November	2026 Commonwealth Heads of Government Meeting	Represented Sri Lanka at the meeting. Held bilateral meetings with leaders and representatives of several Commonwealth member states.	
