= Sri Lanka and the World Bank =

Sri Lanka has been involved with the World Bank since its initial entrance into the International Bank for Reconstruction and Development (IBRD) on August 29, 1950. Currently, Sri Lanka's quota in the IBERT is approximately 515.4 million dollars, thus allotting 5,846 votes or 0.25% of the total votes in the institution. Sri Lanka later became a member of the other institutions in the world bank such as the International Finance Corporation (IFC) on July 20, 1956, with a current quota of 7.491 million dollars, allotting 8,311 votes or 0.32% of the total votes; the International Development Association (IDA) on June 27, 1961, with a current share of 98,100 votes or 0.36% within the institution; the International Center for Settlement of Investment Disputes (ICSID) on November 11, 1967; and the Multilateral Investment Guarantee Agency (MIGA) on May 27, 1988, with a current quota of 4.78 million SDR ($5.64 million). Sri Lanka is currently in the India-led constituency for these organizations, representing the country as part of the South Asian block.

== Current strategy ==
The World Bank initiated projects to help Sri Lanka transition from a lower-middle income country into an upper-middle income country with the aid of the World Bank's Country Partnership Framework (CPF) which is made up of the IDA, IFC, and MIGA. The CPF has claimed a prominent role in recommending Sri Lanka's development policy, focusing on macro-fiscal stability, private sector-led growth, export competitiveness, and global integration. The Bank itself has grouped Sri Lanka's development strategy into three priorities. The first priority is improving the country's fiscal stability and competitiveness through the creation of private sector jobs for the lower end of its population. The second priority focuses on creating economic and social opportunities for its citizens, such as reducing the concentration of poverty, increasing access to education, and boosting the size of its labor force. Finally, the third priority focuses on improving the country's green initiative. This includes projects that reduce the environmental impact of economic transformation, managing resources, and preventing natural disasters. These strategies have manifested themselves in 16 projects with the IDA and IBRD that focus on urban operations and education and an IFC investment of approximately $1 billion. The World Bank is alleged by TamilNet to have funded supposed "genocidal Sinhala colonisation of Tamil lands in Batticaloa".

== Recent projects ==
In Sri Lanka, there are approximately four million students, 215,000 teachers, and 10,000 schools. By the year 2014, the education sector accounts for about 1.9% of the country's GDP, or 7.3% of the government's budget. In collaboration with Sri Lanka's government, the IDA has developed an initiative called the School Improvement Program whose goal is to improve students' access to schools and their ability to learn in the classroom. Sri Lanka's fifth education project to date has been funded by the International Development Association (IDA) through a $100 million contribution, making it Sri Lanka's fifth education project. Therefore, as a result of this effort, student retention through grade 11 has increased from 82% in 2011 to 85% in 2016. Sri Lanka began projects in order to increase the quality of higher education, through the aid of IDA. IDA helped finance Sri Lanka's education projects with a $51 million disbursement from 2003-2010. From this financing, Sri Lanka began the Higher Education for the 21st Century (HETC) project. Through this project, it was able to establish review boards of universities, provide grants, and partner university programs with industries. An additional project is the Sri Lanka Financial Sector Modernization Project which costs $75 million.

Despite significant challenges, Sri Lanka's economic performance remained broadly satisfactory in the first half of 2017. The corrective policy measures taken in the monetary and fiscal fronts have led to gradual stabilization. The construction sector's rapid recovery supported by a strong rebound in investment was partially able to mitigate the impact of inclement weather conditions on the real sector. External buffers strengthened thanks to foreign exchange purchases and improved capital flows. Inflation has risen since the second half of 2016 due to drought and changes to the VAT Act. Authorities pursued the economic reform agenda presented in the government policy statements, albeit at a slower pace, owing to the difficulties faced in a complex political environment and institutional constraints on policy implementation. Parliament passed a new Inland Revenue Law in September 2017, which marks a key milestone towards sustainable revenue-led fiscal consolidation.
