= List of international presidential trips made by Anura Kumara Dissanayake =

Anura Kumara Dissanayake has served as the 10th President of Sri Lanka since 23 September 2024. This article documents all international presidential trips made by Dissanayake during his term in office.

== Summary of international trips ==
As of June 2026, Anura Kumara Dissanayake has made 8 foreign trips to 8 countries.

No. of visits	Country
2	India
1	China, Germany, Japan, Maldives, United Arab Emirates, United States, Vietnam

== 2024 ==
No.	Country	Areas visited	Date(s)	Purpose(s)	Notes	Ref.
1	India	New Delhi; Bodh Gaya	15–17 December 2024	State visit	See also: Sri Lanka–India relations Met with Indian Prime Minister Narendra Modi, Indian President Droupadi Murmu, Indian External Affairs Minister S. Jaishankar and several other Indian diplomats.	

== 2025 ==
No.	Country	Areas visited	Date(s)	Purpose(s)	Notes	Ref.
2	China	Beijing	14–17 January 2025	State visit	See also: China–Sri Lanka relations Met with Chinese President Xi Jinping.	
3	United Arab Emirates	Dubai	10–13 February 2025	State visit	Participated in the World Government Summit 2025. Held meetings with President Mohamed bin Zayed Al Nahyan, Vice President and Prime Minister Mohammed bin Rashid Al Maktoum, and other political and business leaders.	
4	Vietnam	Hanoi; Ho Chi Minh City	3–6 May 2025	State visit	Held meetings with President Lương Cường, Prime Minister Phạm Minh Chính and the General Secretary Tô Lâm. Entered several MoUs and agreements. Chief guest at the United Nations Day of Vesak Ceremony.	
5	Germany	Berlin	11–13 June 2025	State visit	See also: Germany–Sri Lanka relations Held meetings with President Frank-Walter Steinmeier and Federal Ministers Johann Wadephul and Reem Alabali-Radovan. Also met with representatives of the tourism and travel industry.	
6	Maldives	Malé	28–30 July 2025	State visit	See also: Maldives–Sri Lanka relations Held a bilateral meeting with President Mohamed Muizzu. Met with the deputy speaker of the People's Majlis, Ahmed Nazim, and cabinet ministers Abdulla Khaleel, Ali Haidar Ahmed, Mohamed Ghassan Maumoon, Mohamed Saeed and Moosa Zameer. Participated in and addressed a business forum.	
7	United States	New York City	22–27 September 2025	United Nations General Assembly	Addressed the general debate of the eightieth session of the UNGA. Met with US President Donald Trump, UN Secretary General António Guterres and various other political leaders.	
7	Japan	Osaka; Tokyo	27–30 September 2025	State visit	See also: Japan–Sri Lanka relations Attended Sri Lanka Day at Expo 2025. Met with Japanese Prime Minister Shigeru Ishiba, Emperor Naruhito and the business community.	

== 2026 ==
No.	Country	Areas visited	Date(s)	Purpose(s)	Notes	Ref.
8	India	New Delhi	17–20 February 2026	India AI Impact Summit 2026	See also: India–Sri Lanka relations Represented Sri Lanka and addressed the summit. Conducted bilateral meetings with Prime Minister Narendra Modi, Ambassador Sergio Gor and other dignitaries.	
