= Chinese people in Sri Lanka =

Chinese diaspora in Sri Lanka

Sri Lankan Chinese 斯里兰卡华人 斯里蘭卡華人 ශ්‍රී ලාංකික චීන இலங்கை சீனர்கள்
Total population
- ~3,500 Sri Lankan Chinese (2001) (less than 0.20% of the population)

Regions with significant populations
- Majority: Colombo; Minority: Negombo, Kandy, Kurunegala, Matugama, Galle and Trincomalee

Languages
- majority Sinhala, minority Tamil but historically Hakka, Cantonese and other varieties of Chinese

Religion
- majority Theravada Buddhism

Related ethnic groups
- Chinese people in India and Southeast Asia and Sinhalese people

Chinese people in Sri Lanka or Sri Lankan Chinese (Sinhala: ශ්‍රී ලාංකික චීන; Tamil: இலங்கை சீனர்கள்), are Sri Lankan citizens of full or partial Chinese descent born or raised in Sri Lanka. Most trace their origins to Hakka and Cantonese migrants from the southern coastal regions of China and other Han migrants from Hubei and Shandong who migrated to Sri Lanka in the 17th, 18th and 19th centuries.

Intermarriage between Sri Lankans, mostly Sinhalese women, and ethnic Chinese men is very common and they have adopted the culture, language and integrated into broader Sri Lankan society. As a result, the vast majority of Sri Lankan Chinese have partial Sinhalese ancestry. Approximately 80% of Sri Lankan Chinese live in Colombo and are mainly involved in the dental trade, textile retail, hotel and restaurant industries. In the past, some younger generations of Sri Lankan Chinese left the country due to political instability. Additionally, a fair amount of Sri Lankan Chinese have at times migrated to other countries such as the United Kingdom, the United States and Australia.

Despite being small in size, Sri Lankan Chinese have played a notable role in contributing to the development of Sri Lankan cuisine and culinary identity.

== Migration history ==
=== Early visitors and migrants ===
Sri Lanka's earliest known Chinese visitor was Faxian, a 5th-century Buddhist pilgrim travelling overland from his home through present-day Nepal and India before coming to Abhayagiri Dagaba, where he stayed from 410 to 414. Zheng He's Treasure voyages visited Sri Lanka and fought in the Ming–Kotte War. When Ceylon was under Dutch rule in the 17th and 18th centuries, the Dutch East India Company authorities at Batavia (present-day Jakarta, Indonesia) would occasionally deport unemployed or illegal Chinese residents to Cape of Good Hope, the Banda Islands, while only deported some to Sri Lanka, in order to provide manpower and limit the growth of the foreign population in Batavia. In July 1740, a plan was drawn up for mass deportations of Chinese workers from Batavia to work in cinnamon harvesting in Ceylon.

After the British rule of Ceylon, the British colonial authorities brought Chinese Cantonese workers to the island and after the British Raj calamities to India. The British governor Frederick North, the colonial Governor of Ceylon from 1798 to 1805, arranged for the import of migrant workers and soldiers of various ethnic groups, including Malays, Malayalis, and Africans; under North's direction, 47 Malayan Chinese were recruited from Penang to come to Ceylon for agricultural work near Galle (hence the local place-name China Garden) and Trincomalee. Under his immediate successor Thomas Maitland, another 100 Chinese workers were brought in from Penang for work on the ill-fated Hamilton Canal at Negombo Lagoon near Negombo. Local people sometimes mistook these workers for Malays, since they were recruited from British Malaya. British explorer Samuel Baker's account of his time in Ceylon in the late 1840s and early 1850s mentions a few Chinese working along the coast in the vicinity of Trincomalee, harvesting sea cucumbers and shark fins to export back to their home country for use in Chinese cuisine. The 1911 census found a few Chinese speakers remaining in Ceylon.

=== Recent waves of migration ===
Independent migrants of Chinese origin began arriving after the late 1920s. They came down by sea or overland almost all the way via British Raj India. Many settled at Hultsdorf; from there, they spread out to other towns including Maradana, Wellawatte and Negombo. Many of these migrants had not really intended to settle on the island, but simply to make money and return home. However, with the outbreak and intensification of the WW2, and following it Communist victory, these migrants ended up staying in Ceylon far longer than they had intended, and made it their home. The Sri Lankan Chinese community once numbered in the thousands; however, beginning from the 1960s, most began to migrate overseas to Europe as well as North America. 1963 statistics from the Republic of China on Taiwan's Overseas Chinese Affairs Commission showed just 450 registered overseas Chinese remaining on the island.

However, in the late 1990s and early 2000s, with the easing of immigration regulations, a new wave of Chinese migrants came to Sri Lanka to try their luck in small businesses, braving the intensity of the Anti-Tamil violence and the civil war. These new migrants established various community organisations, including a football team. No Chinese people are known to have been killed in the civil war violence, but there was a close call in the August 2006 attack on Pakistani ambassador to Sri Lanka: the roadside bomb blew a hole in the wall of the Garden Hotel (花园饭店), a Chinese restaurant in the area. After the end of the civil war, Sri Lanka has also become a popular destination for rich Hong Kong people and mainland Chinese to purchase vacation homes, for example making up 70% of the purchasers at the Thona Bay resort project near Batticaloa.

The descendants of early migrants who remain in Sri Lanka number only around 3500 persons. Figures from NationMaster also support this number.

== Culture ==
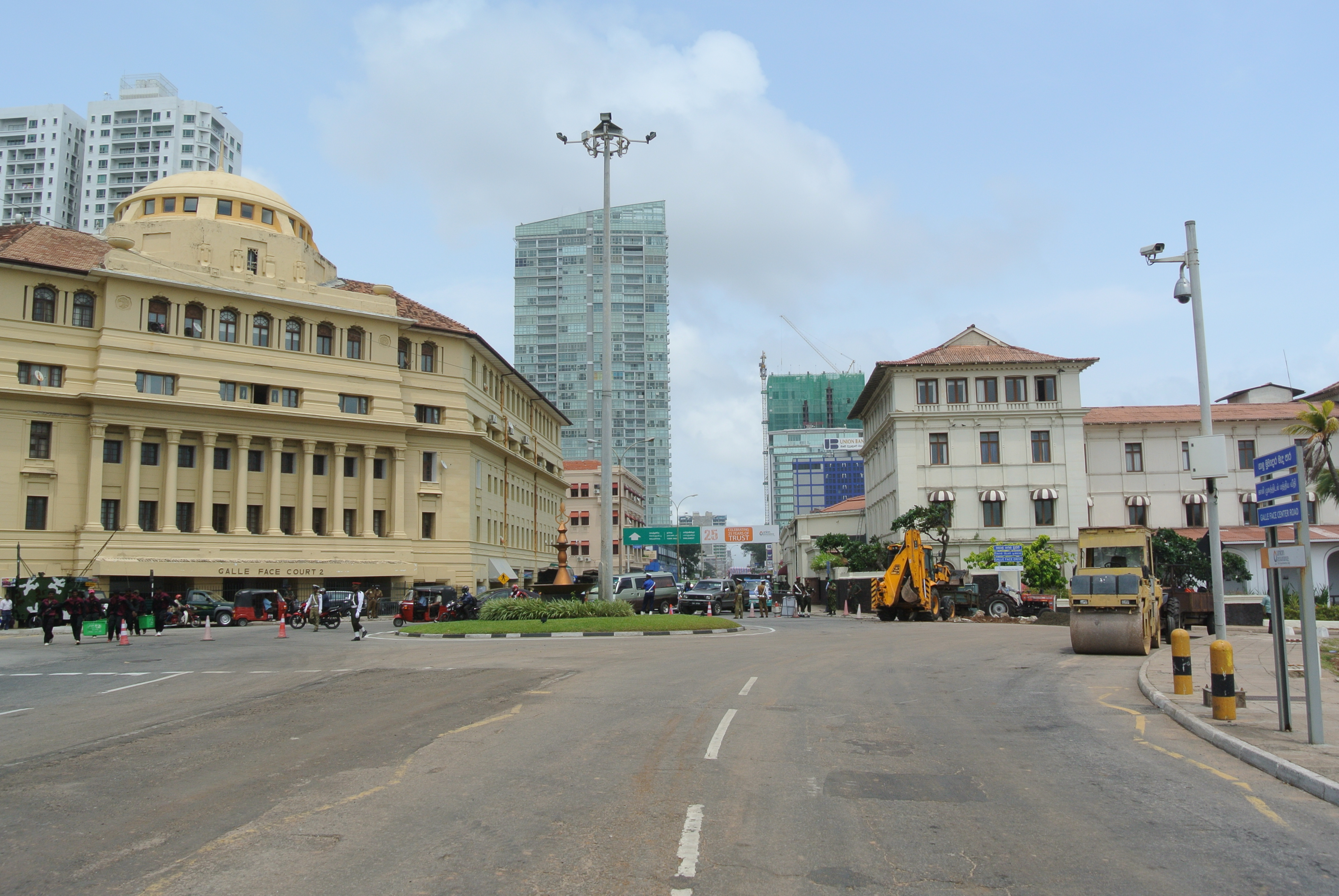
Most Sri Lankan Chinese live in Colombo, the capital of Sri Lanka, where they are primarily involved in the dentist, textile and restaurant industries

=== Language ===
Sri Lankan Chinese largely speak Sinhalese, Tamil or English owing to their assimilation into broader Sri Lankan society. Historically varieties of Chinese were spoken by the community.

=== Religion ===
Like the majority of Sinhalese people, most Sri Lankan Chinese practice Theravada Buddhism.

== Business and employment ==
Early migrants from Hubei often found work as dental technicians or dental assistants, while those from Shandong entered the textile and hospitality industries. The textile salesmen would go door-to-door on foot or bicycle throughout cities and suburbs carrying bundles of silk. The dental clinics, known as "Chinese Dental Mechanics", were often the only providers of dental services in many towns until the government began setting up dental clinics in later years, staffed by graduates of Peradeniya University. There were also Chinese-owned sundry stores in most towns. One major chain, the Chinese Lucky Store, imported goods from Hong Kong; branches still remain in Maradana, Wellawatta, and Trincomalee. There are also many Chinese restaurants in Sri Lanka, but they do not necessarily have Chinese owners or staff. Some authentic Chinese restaurants which remain in Sri Lanka include Parkview and Lotus at Chatham Street in Colombo; many other early restaurants which were opened in the past have closed down. However, more recent Chinese migrants have also got involved in the restaurant trade, as well as opening other kinds of businesses such as traditional Chinese medicine shops and, less reputably, massage parlours. In the meantime, due to the rise of supermarkets and malls and other modernisation of Sri Lanka's retail and medical sectors, the descendants of early migrants have moved away from their families' traditional businesses into areas as varied as shrimp farming and accountancy.

== Citizenship ==
Many descendants of early Chinese migrants were stateless. In January 2008, after lobbying led by University of Peradeniya zoology graduate Chwing-Chi Chang, Prime Minister and Internal Administration Minister Ratnasiri Wickremanayake presented the Parliament of Sri Lanka with a draft bill to grant Sri Lankan citizenship to stateless persons of Chinese origin who had been settled in the country for a long time. It was passed into law without debate on 24 September 2008. The new law, the "Grant of Citizenship to Persons of Chinese Origin" Act, applies to persons "belonging to the Chinese Race" who have been permanent residents of Sri Lanka since 15 November 1948 or who are the descendants of such a person and are themselves resident in Sri Lanka. It gives them the right to apply for the status of citizen of Sri Lanka by registration (otherwise than by descent). In the following two years, a total of 1,200 people acquired Sri Lankan citizenship under the act. The provisions of the act expired in 2013.

== Education ==
The Sri Lankan government has also long provided scholarships for Chinese students to study abroad in Sri Lanka. Initially these scholarships were handled through the Sri Lanka–China Friendship Association. When academic exchanges resumed after the Cultural Revolution, they were handled directly at the governmental level. The most recent group of Chinese students came after discussions during President Mahinda Rajapaksa's 2007 visit to China. The government provided scholarships for 16 Sinhala language majors from Beijing Foreign Studies University; they arrived in September 2008, and spent six months in the country. The Chinese government also sends professors of Chinese language to teach at various universities in Sri Lanka, including the Buddhist and Pali University of Sri Lanka. The country's first Confucius Institute for the teaching of Chinese as a second language was opened at the University of Kelaniya in May 2007.

== Community relations ==
In the early days after Sri Lanka's independence, the Chinese community, small and powerless, were seen as alien and unimportant, and were mostly ignored by the Sri Lankans. Older children made insulting rhymes about Chinese door-to-door salesmen, while parents would scare their younger children by claiming that the salesmen would kidnap them if they misbehaved. Chinese children also sometimes endured racial taunts from their local classmates. However, on the whole, Sri Lankans were not actively hostile towards their Chinese minority, except during the Sino-Indian War of 1962. Later, the influx of Chinese workers drew concern from various sectors. The use of Chinese workers rather than local workers has provoked criticism from opposition politicians and area residents, and even threats of violence. Some Sri Lankan media reports have accused China of using convict labour in Sri Lanka. The influx of Chinese workers has also led to tensions in India – Sri Lanka relations, reportedly leading the Sri Lankan side to reassure the Indians that the workers would not settle in the country permanently, but would instead leave after they finished their work.

The Sri Lankan Chinese Society was formed in 1993 in order to unite the Sri Lankan Chinese community.

== See also ==
- China–Sri Lanka relations
- Chinese diaspora
- Demographics of Sri Lanka

== Bibliography ==
- Armstrong, M. Jocelyn; Armstrong, R. Warwick; Mulliner, K. (2001), Chinese populations in contemporary Southeast Asian societies: identities, interdependence, and international influence, Routledge, ISBN 978-0-7007-1398-1
- Baker, Samuel White (1874), Eight Years' Wanderings in Ceylon, Philadelphia: J. B. Lippincott & Co, OCLC 8271371
- Denham, Sir Edward Brandis (1912), Ceylon at the census of 1911, Ceylon: H. C. Cottle, OCLC 21786101
- Pan, Lynn (1994), Sons of the yellow emperor: a history of the Chinese diaspora, Kodansha Globe, ISBN 978-1-56836-032-4
- Rodrigo, Milan L. (1998), "Chinese in Sri Lanka: A Forgotten Minority", in Wang, L. Ling-chi; Wang, Gungwu (eds.), The Chinese diaspora: selected essays, Singapore: Times Academic Press, pp. 231–241, ISBN 978-981-210-093-1
- Lin-Rodrigo, Milan L. (2001), "In Search of Lin Jiazhuang", in Khu, Josephine M. T. (ed.), Cultural curiosity: thirteen stories about the search for Chinese roots, University of California Press, ISBN 978-0-520-22341-7
