= Y. Karunadasa =

Sri Lankan scholar in Buddhist Studies (1934–2026)

- වයි. කරුණාදාස
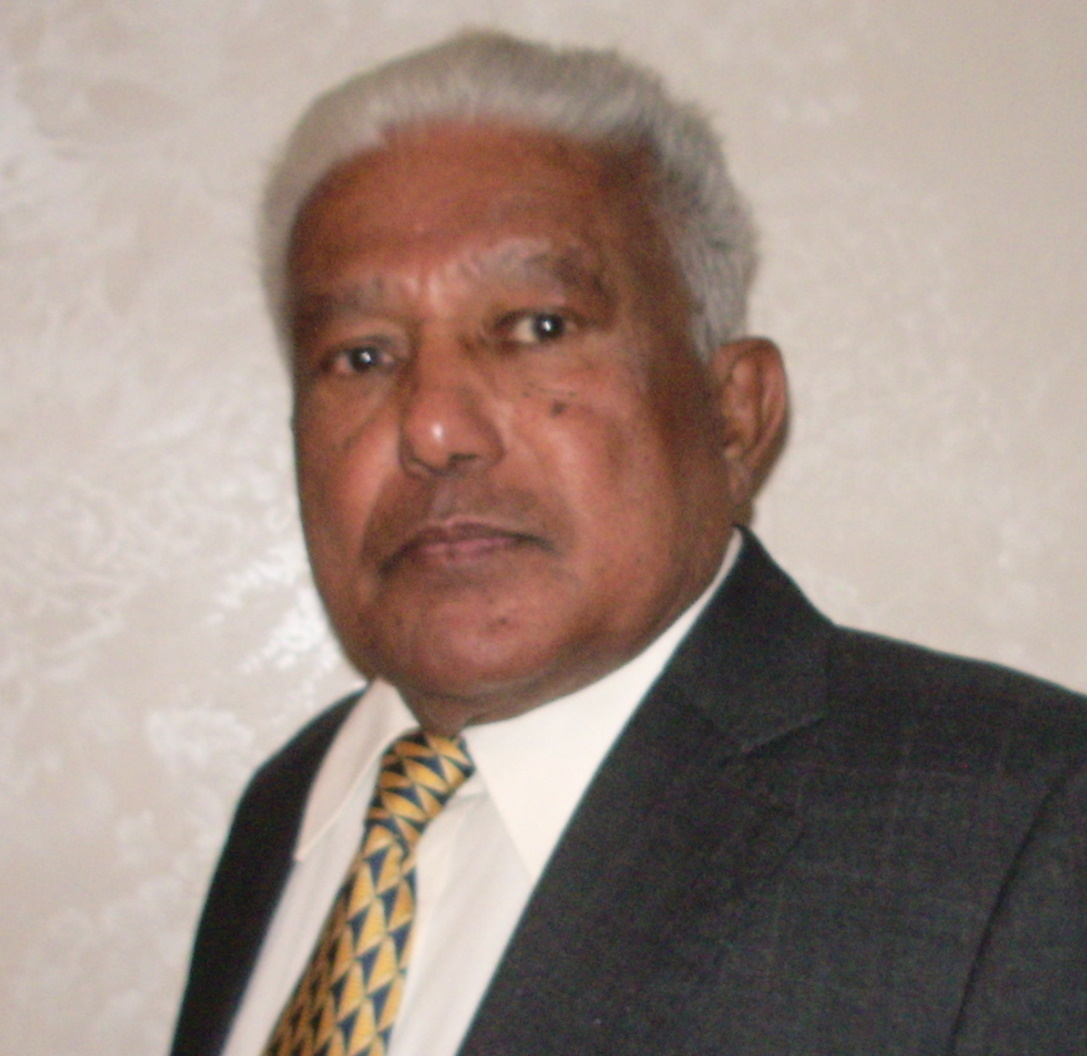
- Born: 1934; British Ceylon
- Died: 26 April 2026 (aged 92); Colombo, Sri Lanka
- Education: University of London
- Scientific career
- Fields: Philosophy, Buddhist Studies
- Workplaces: Hong Kong University

Yakupitiyage Karunadasa (1934 – 26 April 2026) was a Sri Lankan scholar in Buddhist Studies. His main areas of specialisation were Early Buddhism and Theravada Abidhamma.

== Education and career ==
Y. Karunadasa obtained a First Class Bachelor of Arts degree from the University of Ceylon in 1958, a Ph.D. from the University of London in 1963, and was awarded an honorary D.Litt. by the University of Kelaniya in 2002. He was an emeritus Professor of the University of Kelaniya, where he served as Dean of the Faculty of Arts and as the Director of its Postgraduate Institute of Pali and Buddhist Studies. He has also served as the Bukkyo Dendo Kyokai Visiting professor of Buddhist Studies at the School of Oriental and African Studies of the University of London, as Distinguished Numata Chair Professor at the University of Calgary, and as Tung Lin Kok Yuen Visiting professor of Buddhist Studies at the University of Toronto. He taught at the Center of Buddhist Studies of the University of Hong Kong as the MaMa Charitable Foundation Visiting professor. In 1997 he was felicitated with a volume of articles on Buddhist Studies written by his colleagues. In 2005 he was decorated with the title of Sri Lanka Sikhamani by the Government of Sri Lanka in recognition of his meritorious service to the country of his birth.

Karunadasa died in Colombo on 26 April 2026, at the age of 92.

== Publications ==
=== Books ===
- The Buddhist Analysis of Matter, (reprinted), The Buddhist Research Society, Singapore, 1989, pp. I-XVIII, 1986.
- The Dhamma Theory: Philosophical Cornerstone of the Abhidhamma, Wheel Publications No. 412/413, Buddhist Publication Society, Kandy, 1996.
- The Atthakatha Correspondence Table, in collaboration with Sodo Mori and T. Endo, Pali Text Society, London, 1995 Mori, Sodo, Y. Karunadasa & Toshiichi Endo (1994). Pali Atthakatha Correspondence Table. Oxford: Pali Text Society.
- Theravada Abhidhamma : its inquiry into the nature of conditioned reality Published by Centre for Buddhist Studies, Hong Kong University, 2010
- Early Buddhist Teachings: The Middle Position in Theory and Practice Published by Centre for Buddhist Studies, Hong Kong University, 2013
