= National Lotteries Board =

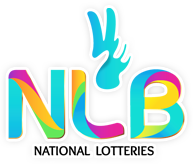
- Company type: Government-owned corporation
- Industry: Gambling
- Founded: 1954; 71 years ago
- Founder: Edward A. Nugawela
- Headquarters: No 32, Deshamanya N W J Mudalige Mawatha, Colombo 01.
- Area served: Sri Lanka
- Key people: Jagath P Wijeweera (Chairman)
- Products: Lottery
- Revenue: ▼ Rs 6.5 billion (2018)
- Net income: ▲ Rs 1.2 billion (2018)
- Owner: Ministry of Finance
- Website: www.nlb.lk

National Lotteries Board also known NLB (formerly known as Hospital Lottery) is a Sri Lankan government owned national lottery company. Founded in 1955, under Finance Act No.4 of 1955, originally organized under the Minister of Health and was originally headed by Major Edward A. Nugawela. (1947–1958). The National Lotteries Board resisted under Finance Act no.11 of 1963. NLB number total agency network approximated 3,000. In 2017 National Lotteries Board fully operated by Ministry of Finance. NLB, earn Rs. 17.5 billion in 2015. Sri Lanka government one of main revenue but since 2018 revenue decreased. Revenue decreased by 18% in 2018.

== Lotteries ==
Several games operate under the NLB brand:

- GOVISETHA
- MAHAJANA SAMPATHA
- DHANA NIDHANAYA
- DARU DIRI SAMPATHA
- JATHIKA SAMPATHA
- VASANA SAMPATHA
- SEVANA
