= Sirisumana Godage =

Sri Lankan book publisher (1936–2026)

Deshabandhu Sirisumana Godage
- සිරිසුමන ගොඩගේ
- Born: May 1936; Palatuwa, Matara, British Ceylon
- Died: 29 April 2026 (aged 90)
- Occupations: Proprietor of Godage International Publishers (Pvt.) Ltd., S. Godage & Brothers and Godage Book Emporium
- Spouse: Nanda Godage (m. 1982)
- Website: godage.com

Deshabandhu Sirisumana Godage (May 1936 – 29 April 2026) was a Sri Lankan businessman and book publisher. He was the chairman of Godage International Publishers, one of Sri Lanka's major book publishers.

Godage was conferred the honorary title of Deshabandhu in 2003 in recognition of his services to society.

Godage died on 29 April 2026, at the age of 90.
