= China–Sri Lanka relations =

- China: Sri Lanka

China–Sri Lanka relations (Sinhala: චීන-ශ්‍රී ලංකා සබඳතා China-Shri Lanka Sabandatha, Tamil: சீனா-இலங்கை உறவுகள், Chinese: 中国－斯里兰卡关系) are the bilateral relations between the People's Republic of China and Democratic Socialist Republic of Sri Lanka. There is a Chinese embassy located in Colombo and a Sri Lankan embassy situated in Beijing. Historical and cultural ties between the two countries extend back hundreds of years.

Diplomatic ties between Sri Lanka and China have been very close, especially during Sri Lanka Freedom Party governments. On February 7, 1957, China and Sri Lanka established diplomatic relations. In 1996, then Sri Lankan President Chandrika Bandaranaike Kumaratunga paid a state visit to China at the invitation of then General Secretary of the Chinese Communist Party Jiang Zemin. The two sides signed two agreements to enhance economic cooperation. Relations between both countries during the rule of Sri Lankan president, Mahinda Rajapaksa, resulted in many agreements and saw closer relations due to Rajapaksa's pro-China stance. Under previous Sri Lankan president, Maithripala Sirisena, relations remain strong with Sirisena interested in balancing both Chinese and Indian influence in the country. Despite this, recent developments have shown a pro-China tilt in Sri Lanka's current foreign policy evident in the continued Chinese investment in Sri Lanka and the country's support of China's position in the South China Sea dispute.

Sri Lanka is a major country on the String of Pearls which is part of the Chinese strategic initiative in the Indian Ocean, known as the Maritime Silk Road and is part of the bigger development strategy known as the One Belt, One Road.

== Historical ties ==
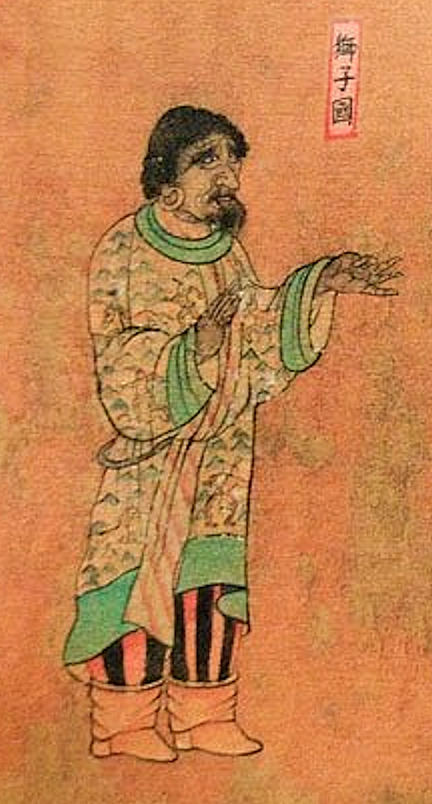
Ambassador from Sri Lanka (獅子國 Shiziguo) to China (Liang dynasty), Wanghuitu (王会图), circa 650 CE

Faxian traveled to Sri Lanka in 410 and resided in the country for two years before returning to China in a merchant ship. The Karanamudra Sutra and Vimuttimagga, two Buddhist texts in Sri Lanka, were translated to Chinese in 489 and 505 respectively. Amoghavajra, a powerful Buddhist monk in Chinese history traveled to Sri Lanka and was responsible for translating the Karandamudra Sutra into Chinese and taking it back to China in the 8th century. Buddhist nuns (or Bhikkhunis) from Sri Lanka, vice versa, traveled to China in 429 and 433.

Chinese/East Asian architecture, alongside Indian architecture, was one of the main foreign influences on Sri Lankan architecture and played a significant role in shaping it.

The form of martial art known as Cheena di from Sri Lanka derives from Chinese influence via Shaolin monks who arrived to the island on pilgrimage and taught it to the Sinhalese people.

During the Ming Emperor Yongle's reign, Admiral Zheng He's fleet visited Sri Lanka and fought in the Ming–Kotte War. The Galle Trilingual Inscription, dated 1409, was erected in Galle, Sri Lanka to both commemorate Zheng He's second visit to the country and to recognize the legitimacy of the Ming emperor among foreign rulers.

As in many other parts of East, South and Southeast Asia, Chinese immigrants migrated to Sri Lanka during the 18th and 19th centuries, albeit in much smaller numbers relative to neighboring countries such as India, Myanmar, or other parts of Southeast Asia. As of the 2001 census, they comprise less than 0.20% of the population and have integrated into broader Sri Lankan society.

== Modern diplomatic ties ==
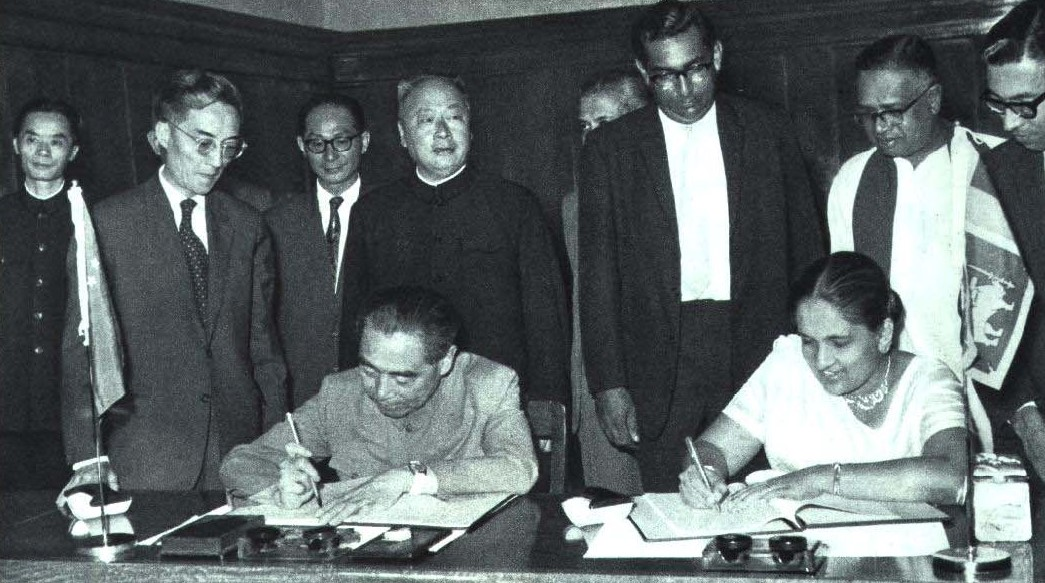
Zhou Enlai and Sirimavo Bandaranaike in 1964.

Sri Lanka (then Ceylon) was among the first countries to recognize the People's Republic of China (PRC), having established formal diplomatic relations in 1957. However, this would not be the first instance of relations between the two nations as the Ceylon-China Rubber-Rice Pact, signed in 1952 proved to the cornerstone of the early years of diplomatic relation. Since establishing formal relations, the two countries have regularly exchanged high-level visits resulting in a variety of agreements.

From the 1950s to the early 1970s, China was a major source of foreign aid to Sri Lanka.

In the early 1960s, the two countries signed agreements on economic exchanges and maritime relations.

During a visit by Chinese Premier Zhou Enlai to Ceylon in 1964, President Sirimavo Bandaranaike requested that China assist with building an international conference center. China agreed and the project, the Bandaranaike Memorial International Conference Hall, was completed in 1973.

In 1996, then Sri Lankan President Chandrika Bandaranaike Kumaratunga paid a state visit to China at the invitation of the Chinese leader Jiang Zemin. The two sides signed two agreements to enhance economic cooperation. With the development and growth witnessed in China, the relationship have enhanced with China providing economic, cultural, military and technical assistance to Sri Lanka.

Sri Lanka strongly supported China's successful 2007 application to join the South Asian Association for Regional Cooperation (SAARC).

During the Mahinda Rajapaska presidency (2005-2015), Sri Lanka and China signed numerous agreements on trade, investment, technical cooperation, cultural exchanges, and educational exchanges.

The 2000s and 2010s saw a substantial inflow of foreign investment in Sri Lanka by China. China's first major project was the Colombo National Performing Arts Theater (also referred as the Nelum Pokuna Theater). Under the Presidency of Mahinda Rajapaksa, the relations between the two nations proved to be closer, as the postwar nation was looking for new FDIs, and China proved to be one of the largest investors. These projects were both standalone projects and some linked to China's Belt and Road Initiative (BRI). Sri Lanka joined the BRI in 2017. These infrastructure investments include the Port of Hambantota, the Hambantota International Airport, the Norocholai Power Station and the ambitious Port City Colombo project which the Chinese leader and CCP General Secretary Xi Jinping launched in 2014. Other projects in Sri Lanka funded by China include land reclamation projects.

In contrast to various conditions imposed by the World Bank or IMF, China has attached few conditions to its loans to Sri Lanka, requiring no policy reforms or similar structural adjustments. The use of Chinese labor on the project funded by the loan is the only condition for most Chinese loans to Sri Lanka.

China has been a significant provider of foreign aid to Sri Lanka for infrastructure funding since the end of the Sri Lankan civil war in 2009. Because China runs a trade surplus with Sri Lanka, both sides of the bilateral relationship view Chinese foreign aid as a means of ensuring the relationship remains mutually beneficial.

China and Sri Lanka also share a military relationship, with China selling a range of modern armaments to the Sri Lanka Armed Forces.

In May 2019, Sri Lankan authorities caught the former chief of Military intelligence for allegedly acting as a Chinese mole and trying to obstruct a probe by Indian and American agencies into the Easter bombings.

In July 2019, UN ambassadors from 50 countries, including Sri Lanka, have signed a joint letter to the UNHRC defending China's treatment of Uyghurs and other Muslim minority groups in the Xinjiang region. In June 2020, Sri Lanka was one of 53 countries that backed the Hong Kong national security law at the United Nations.

In January 2023, China offered debt aid to crisis-hit Sri Lanka, however, IMF help was uncertain. India had committed to support Sri Lanka with financing and debt relief, but the island nation also needed China's support.

== Issues ==
=== Hambantota port issue ===
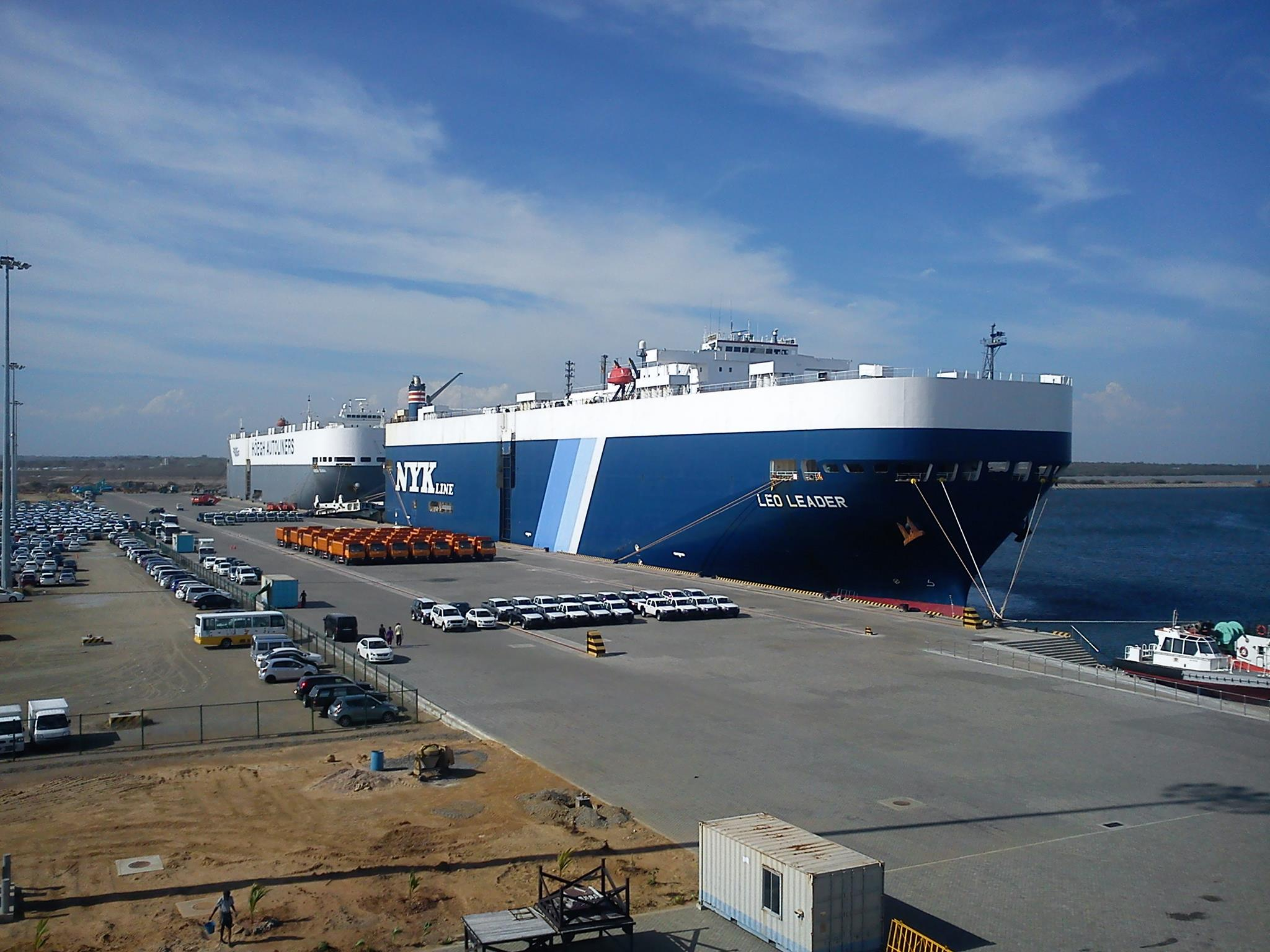
Hambantota Port one of major emerging port of South Asia funded by China

Beginning in the early 2000s, Sri Lanka sought international loans to develop Hambantota port. These efforts intensified during the presidency of Hambantota native Mahinda Rajapaska, who had made a campaign pledge to revitalize Hambantota's economy. The Rajapaska administration unsuccessfully sought loans from the United States and India before obtaining loans from China.

In July 2006, Sri Lankan foreign minister Mangala Samaraweera met in China with Li Ruogu, the president of the Export-Import Bank of China. After this visit, Sri Lanka and China agreed that both countries would encourage Chinese companies to participate in the port project and encourage the use of concessional loans from China to finance the project. Rajapaksa visited China in February 2007 and the visit resulted in China's decision to fund the port development.

There have been claims that Sri Lanka was overwhelmed by Chinese debts, and then forced to cede Hambantota Port to China after not being able to pay off Chinese loans for the port. However such claims have been discredited by numerous scholars including Chatham House's Lee Jones and Shahar Hameiri, who pointed out that Sri Lanka's debt crisis was largely unconnected to Chinese lending, and instead the crisis was largely a result of excessive borrowing on Western capital markets. Furthermore, at the time of the leasing of the port to China, there were no immediate issues to service Chinese loans but instead there was an urgent need to repay off then maturing dollar-dominated sovereign bonds to mostly western entities. Instead of asking the IMF for a bailout, Sri Lanka had decided instead to turn to a Chinese company, China Merchants, to both invest in and lease the port, in order to help pay off these maturing ISBs, and was not actually forced by China to cede the port to repay port-related debts as others had claimed.

Based on some reports, between 2004 and 2014 China provided $7 billion in loans and investment, including loans for the construction of a port in Hambantota. However, there are concerns both locally and in the international media that Sri Lanka cannot afford these loans since the nation is currently $64 billion in debt and using roughly 95% of the government's revenue to pay back loans. Contrary to critic's narratives, a 2022 Johns Hopkins University study found that there were no Chinese debt-to-equity swaps, no asset seizures, and no "hidden debt" regarding the Hambantota port issue.

Writing in 2023, academic and former UK diplomat Kerry Brown states that China's relationship to the Hambantota port has become the opposite of the theorized debt-trap modus operandi some critics attribute to China. Brown observes that China has had to commit more money to the project, expose itself to further risk, and has had to become entangled in complex local politics.

Hambantota Port was financed through Chinese loans, and built by a Chinese company. In the case of the port in Hambantota, the two countries have recently come to a deal with Sri Lanka selling an 80% stake via a 99-year lease in the port to the state-run China Merchants Port Holdings, while Sri Lanka retains control of port security. The US$1.12 billion in new equity from China Merchants Port Holdings increased Sri Lanka's foreign reserves and allowed it to pay foreign debts to non-Chinese creditors.The Sri Lankan Foreign Minister Ravi Karunanayake said "It is unaffordable for an activity that doesn't bring any economic returns, so that's compelling us to look at options." China is also building a 15000-acre industrial zone near Hambantota port, in which it will have a major stake and will also be ceded to China for 99 years. Both of these projects have led to fears among the local population that the area will become a "Chinese colony". This has led to violent protests by locals including Buddhist monks against the port and the industrial zone who stand to lose their lands.

On 16 August 2022, Sri Lankan Government granted permission to dock Chinese research vessel Yuan Wang 5 at the Hambantota port despite Western countries and India's concerns. China insists the ship is on a friendly research mission not a military one.

In 2023, the Export-Import Bank of China provided Sri Lanka an extension on its debts due in 2022 and 2023.

== Defense ties ==
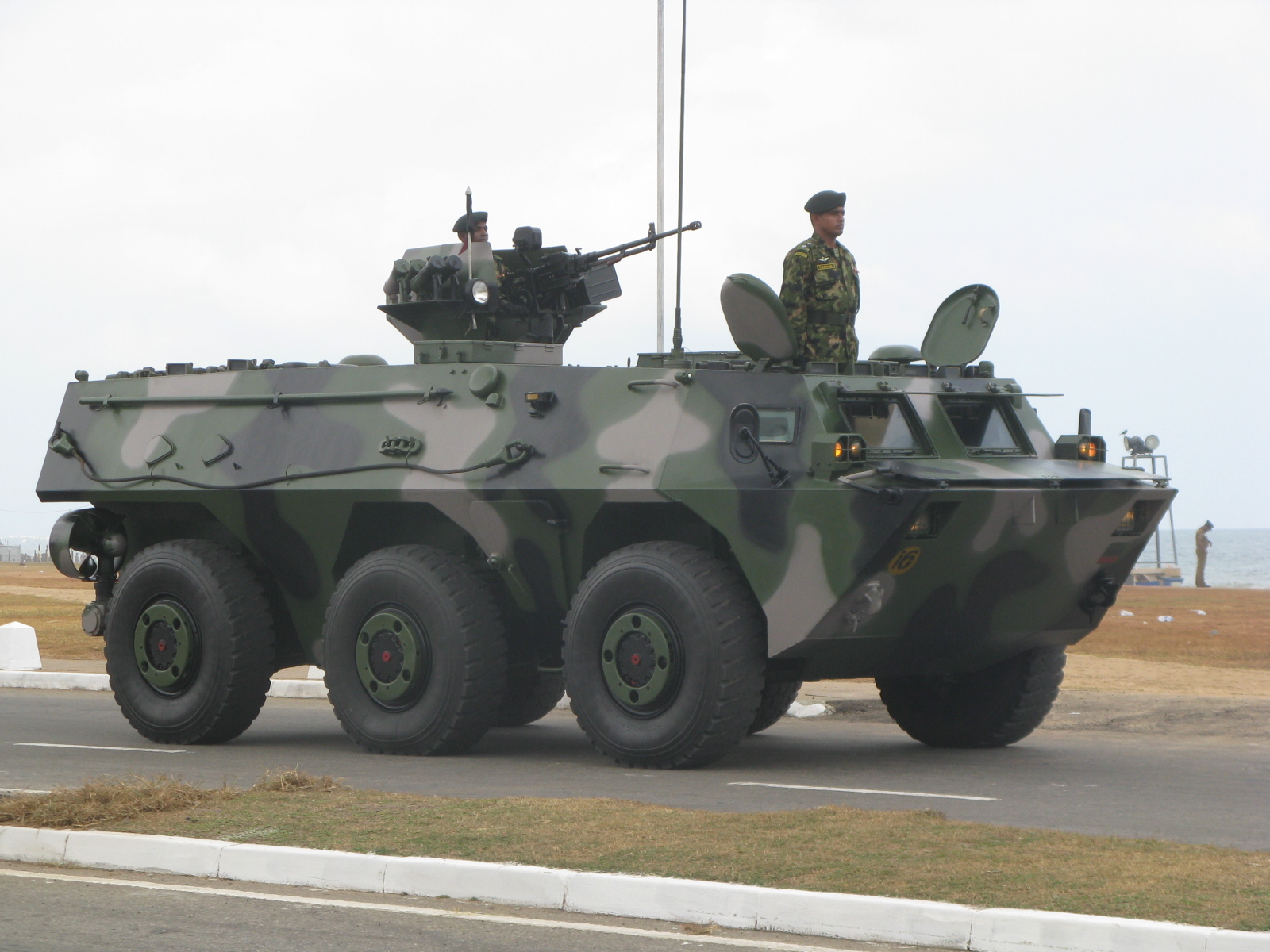
Chinese WZ551 (Type 92) APC in Sri Lankan use

China has been a continuing source of military equipment to Sri Lanka, and is helping to modernize and expand the Sri Lanka Armed Forces. Chinese-supplied weapons were instrumental in the defeat of the Liberation Tigers of Tamil Elam in 2008 and 2009. Thus when the US ended military aid in 2007 over Sri Lanka's human-rights concerns, China provided Sri Lanka $1bn (£690m) to become the island's biggest donor, giving tens of millions of dollars' worth of military equipment. China's supply of arms in this gap gave Sri Lanka freedom from the conditional restraints that the US and other potential suppliers such as India would have imposed. As a result, Sri Lanka views China as a reliable partner in security matters. During the final war, China established bonded warehouses in Sri Lanka. Military officials only needed authorisation from the Sri Lankan Ministry of Defence to request weapons from these warehouses, which contained a range of weapons that were sent by China.

China exports military equipment to the Sri Lanka military including: ammunition, anti-tank guided missiles, rocket launchers and shoulder-fired surface-to-air missiles, deep penetration bombs and rockets, mortar ammunition, night vision devices, artillery, armor, mortars, security equipment, tanks, jets, naval vessels, radars, and communications equipment.

China also aids in the training of Sri Lankan military personnel. Nowadays, the China National Aero Technology Import-Export Corporation is helping the Sri Lanka government in constructing an Aircraft Maintenance Center. Even though the location has not yet been finalized, Katunayake, Mattala, and Trincomalee are possible locations.

Chinese nuclear submarines have made several visits to Sri Lanka in September and November 2014, despite strong displeasure from the Indian government.

In October 2016, the Chinese government announced it would offer military aid to Sri Lanka to help them purchase Chinese made military equipment. China National Aero-Technology Import & Export Corporation (CATIC) also helped the Sri Lanka Air Force set up the Aircraft Overhaul Wing and provided Chinese specialists who assisted and guided the SLAF.

== Chinese expatriates in Sri Lanka ==
The landmark "Nelum Pokuna" (Lotus Pond) is a symbol of China-Sri Lanka Friendship

Chinese international students, migrant workers, and business people have moved to the country in the 1990s and 2000s. In recent years, Chinese engineering companies who have been contracted for projects in Sri Lanka have also brought in migrant workers from China. The earliest such workers came in 1970 to work on the Bandaranaike Memorial International Conference Hall. More recently they are working on infrastructure projects at Hambantota, such as the Hambantota International Airport and the Port of Hambantota. The port project, run by China Harbor Engineering Co Ltd, was reported to employ 328 Sri Lankan and 235 Chinese workers in 2008. Due to the influx of Chinese workers, Hambantota locals have even begun doing business growing and selling Chinese vegetables such as Chinese cabbage, choy sum, and kale for their kitchens. The Norocholai Power Station, a fossil fuel power station construction project near Puttalam, reportedly employs 900 Chinese engineers, helpers, welders, and fitters, with the assistance of only a few Sri Lankans. Other construction projects known to employ Chinese workers include the Colombo National Performing Arts Theater (reported to employ 1,000 Chinese workers) and a water-supply upgrade project in Colombo run by China Geo Engineering Corporation.

== Modern cultural ties ==
Sri Lanka has become a very popular destination for Chinese tourists and now form the largest nationality of tourists coming to the country. In the first seven months of 2016, 1,173,618 Chinese tourists visited the country. Almost 1.8 million visited in 2015.

Chinese cuisine enjoys a lot of popularity in Sri Lanka and like Indian cuisine, restaurants serving Chinese cuisine can be found across the island.

Sinhalese language-dubbed Chinese and Hong Kong television dramas are popular and are broadcast on major television networks in Sri Lanka; subtitled copies are sold in DVD stores across the country as well. Chinese action films are popular and in the past enjoyed a lot of popularity in the country with CD stores across the country supplying the DVDs. Additionally, Chinese-origin TV channels and radio stations have begun broadcasting in the country including: China Central Television, China Radio International and Celestial Movies.

== Public opinion ==
A survey published in 2026 by the Pew Research Center found that 72% of Sri Lankans had a favorable view of China, while 11% had an unfavorable view.

== See also ==
- Foreign relations of China
- Foreign relations of Sri Lanka
- Chinese people in Sri Lanka

== Bibliography ==
- Armstrong, M. Jocelyn; Armstrong, R. Warwick; Mulliner, K. (2001), Chinese populations in contemporary Southeast Asian societies: identities, interdependence, and international influence, Routledge, ISBN 978-0-7007-1398-1
