= Magistrate's court (Sri Lanka) =

Court of first instance

The magistrate's courts in Sri Lanka is a court of first instance headed by a magistrate who is vested with original criminal jurisdiction.

== Jurisdiction ==
Originally known as police magistrate's courts, the current magistrate's courts were established under the Judicature Act, No. 2 of 1978 in each judicial division in Sri Lanka. The Minister in charge of the subject of Justice in consultation with the Chief Justice and the President of the Court of Appeal would define the territorial limits of each judicial division. At present there are 72 judicial divisions in Sri Lanka.

The magistrate's courts have jurisdiction over:

- criminal cases filed under the penal code and other laws within its jurisdiction.
- First mortem examinations.
- Post mortem examinations.
- Issue of Warrants of Judicial orders to arrest and produce suspected persons.
- Issue of search warrants.
- Ordering persons to enter into bonds of good conduct and preventive jurisdiction on public nuisance.

Every magistrate's court is vested with original criminal jurisdiction (other than in respect of offences upon indictment in the High Court), and is ordinarily empowered to impose sentences up to a fine of Rs. 1,500 and/or 2 years rigorous/simple imprisonment unless power is vested in the Magistrate's Court to impose higher penalties by special provision. Appeals from convictions, sentences or orders of Magistrate's Courts within a Province lie to the High Court of the Province. In judicial divisions which does not have primary courts, magistrate's courts exercise the jurisdiction of the Primary Courts.

== Appointment and removal of magistrates ==
All magistrates are appointed by the Judicial Service Commission, which has power of dismissal and disciplinary control of the magistrates. Additional magistrates would be appointed to a magistrate's court. Magistrates would be seconded to municipal magistrate courts. The Chief Magistrates Court in Colombo is the senior of the magistrate's courts in the judicial division of Colombo.

== Unofficial magistrates ==
In remote areas where there are only one magistrate and/or additional magistrate, unofficial magistrates (known as acting magistrates) would be appointed to site on behalf of the magistrate in his/her absence and postpone hearings to a later date.

== List of magistrate's courts ==
- Magistrate's Court Akkraipattu
- Magistrate's Court Ampara
- Magistrate's Court Angunukolapelessa
- Magistrate's Court Anuradhapura
- Magistrate's Court Attanagalla
- Magistrate's Court Avissawella
- Magistrate's Court Baddegama
- Magistrate's Court Badulla
- Magistrate's Court Balangoda
- Magistrate's Court Balapitiya
- Magistrate's Court Bandarawela
- Magistrate's Court Batticaloa
- Magistrate's Court Chavakachcheri
- Magistrate's Court Chilaw
- Magistrate's Court Colombo
- Magistrate's Court Dambulla
- Magistrate's Court Elpitiya
- Magistrate's Court Embilipitiya
- Magistrate's Court Fort
- Magistrate's Court Galagedara
- Magistrate's Court Galgamuwa
- Magistrate's Court, Galle
- Magistrate's Court Gampaha
- Magistrate's Court Gampola
- Magistrate's Court Gangodawila
- Magistrate's Court Hambantota
- Magistrate's Court Hatton
- Magistrate's Court Hingurakgoda
- Magistrate's Court Homagama
- Magistrate's Court Horana
- Magistrate's Court Jaffna
- Magistrate's Court Kaduwela
- Magistrate's Court Kalmunai
- Magistrate's Court Kalutara
- Magistrate's Court Kandy
- Magistrate's Court Kantale
- Magistrate's Court Kayts
- Magistrate's Court Kegalle
- Magistrate's Court Kekiwara
- Magistrate's Court Kesbewa
- Magistrate's Court Killinochchi
- Magistrate's Court Krebithigollawa
- Magistrate's Court Kuliyapitiya
- Magistrate's Court Kurunegala
- Magistrate's Court Maho
- Magistrate's Court Maligakanda
- Magistrate's Court Mallakam
- Magistrate's Court Mannar
- Magistrate's Court Marawila
- Magistrate's Court Matale
- Magistrate's Court Matara
- Magistrate's Court Matugama
- Magistrate's Court Mawanella
- Magistrate's Court Minuwangoda
- Magistrate's Court Moneragala
- Magistrate's Court Moratuwa
- Magistrate's Court Morawaka
- Magistrate's Court Mount Lavinia
- Magistrate's Court Mullativu
- Magistrate's Court Mutur
- Magistrate's Court Nawalapitiya
- Magistrate's Court Negombo
- Magistrate's Court Nuwara Eliya
- Magistrate's Court Panadura
- Magistrate's Court Point Pedro
- Magistrate's court polgahawela
- Magistrate's Court Polonnaruwa
- Magistrate's Court Pugoda
- Magistrate's Court Puttalam
- Magistrate's Court Ratnapura
- Magistrate's Court Ruwanwella
- Magistrate's Court Tangalle
- Magistrate's Court Teldeniya
- Magistrate's Court Thambuththegama
- Magistrate's Court Tissamaharamaya
- Magistrate's Court Trincomalee
- Magistrate's Court Vauniya
- Magistrate's Court Wallawaya
- Magistrate's Court Walasmulla
- Magistrate's Court Warakapola
- Magistrate's Court Wariyapola
- Magistrate's Court Wattala
- Magistrate's Court Welimada

== See also ==
- Unofficial magistrate
- Supreme Court of Sri Lanka
- Constitution of Sri Lanka
