= IMF Stand-By Arrangement =

The IMF Stand-By Arrangement (SBA) is an economic program of the International Monetary Fund (IMF) involving financial aid to a member state in need of financial assistance, normally arising from a financial crisis. In return for aid, the economic program stipulates needed reforms in the recipient country aimed at bringing it back on a path of financial stability and economic sustainability. The SBA is a sub-set of IMF and World Bank programs aimed at Structural adjustment.

== Description ==
IMF’s Stand-By Arrangement was created in June 1952 to provide financing to countries requiring help with balance of payments problems. The SBA has often been used by member countries and is the dominant lending instrument of the IMF, especially for emerging market countries. After a significant pause in such aid, many countries required such financial assistance from the IMF due to the 2008 financial crisis. The financing terms are normally more advantageous than private markets offer. In 2009, the IMF upgraded the SBA "to be more flexible and responsive to members countries’ needs." At the same time, the borrowing limits were doubled and more funds were made available up front. Generally, the "conditions were streamlined and simplified."

== Recipients ==
Several countries received an SBA during the Great Recession, including Hungary, Iceland and Greece.

In 2023, Pakistan secured a US$3 billion stand-by arrangement spread over nine months from the IMF.

== Criticisms ==
For a long time, structural adjustment programs have been criticised for making excessive demands of austerity in the recipient country in return for financial aid. Such criticisms have been less pronounced in recent years, notably since 2009, when the IMF's SBA policies were modified to be more responsive to the recipient countries needs. An exception is the Greek government-debt crisis. The resulting pronounced cutbacks in public spending resulted in mass protests and riots. In this case, the criticism was increasingly directed at the Euro convergence criteria, considering the large amount of financial aid also coming from other Euro Area countries, rather than an IMF standby arrangement.

== See also ==
- European sovereign debt crisis
