= Nihal Sri Ameresekere =

Sri Lankan consultant and writer (1947–2026)

Nihal Sri Ameresekere FCA, FCMA, CMA, CGMA, CFE
- නිහාල් ශ්‍රී අමරසේකර
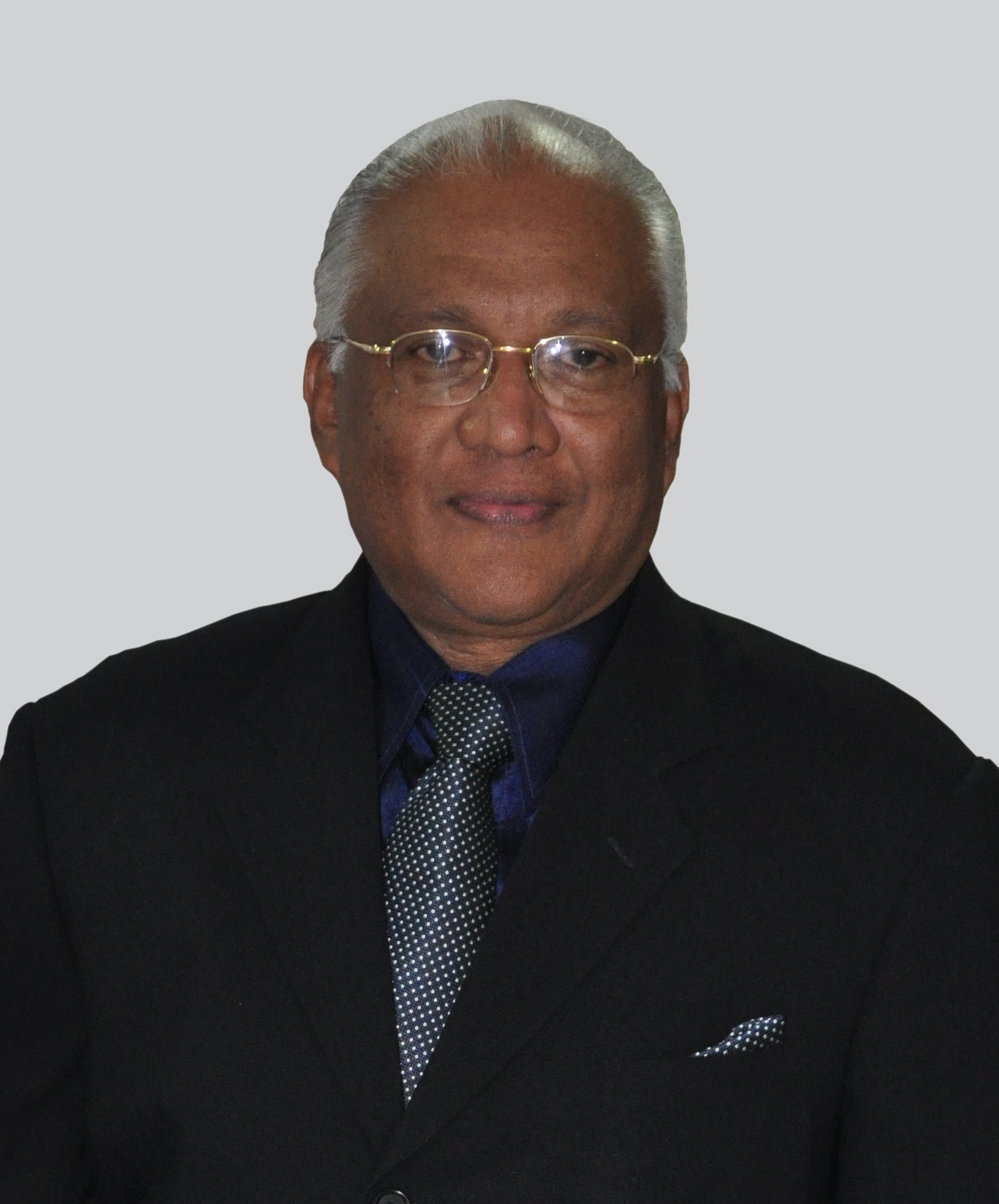
- Born: 16 July 1947; Kandy, British Ceylon
- Died: 2 July 2026 (aged 78)
- Education: S. Thomas' College, Mount Lavinia

Nihal Sri Ameresekere (16 July 1947 – 2 July 2026) was a Sri Lankan professional and litigation support consultant, author on fraud and corruption, and public interest activist.

Ameresekere served as an advisor and consultant to the Ministry of Finance and Planning and Plan Implementation. Afterwards, he was nominated by president Chandrika Kumaratunga to serve as Chairman of the Public Enterprises Reform Commission and Chairman and Director of Private Sector Infrastructure Development Co. Ltd. and Hotel Developers (Lanka) Ltd. He resigned from all these positions on 11 November 2005.

== Career ==
Ameresekere litigated in the general public interest. He served as a member of the International Association of Anti-Corruption Authorities and an associate member of the American Bar Association.

In 2008, Ameresekere challenged the Sri Lankan government's Appropriation Bill in the Supreme Court of Sri Lanka and raised several issues with the government's fiscal transparency and accountability to the public.

The Association of Certified Fraud Examiners, the world's leading provider of anti-fraud training and education, awarded Ameresekere with a Certified Fraud Examiner (CFE) designation in 2008.

In 2014, he was appointed a director of the Board of Directors of the International Consortium on Governmental Financial Management (ICGFM).

In December 2015, Ameresekere was involved in controversy due to a then unpaid overdraft of 100 million LKR, drawn on a state bank in December 2014. Ameresekere claimed he could repay the money within one month since he was owed a larger sum by the Treasury, supplying a letter from the Deputy Secretary to the Treasury, S. R. Attygalle, to that effect.

== Death ==
Ameresekere died on 2 July 2026, at the age of 78.

== Bibliography ==
Ameresekere authored a series of professional books on real case studies dealing with corruption, fraud, economic crime, public finance, governance and the rule of law.

- Ameresekere, Nihal Sri (2011), Colombo Hilton Hotel Construction – Fraud on Sri Lanka Government – Sri Lanka's First Derivative Action in Law, AuthorHouse, ISBN 978-1-4567-7294-9
- Ameresekere, Nihal Sri (2011), Derivative / Hedging Deals by Citibank, USA, Standard Chartered Bank, UK, Deutsche Bank, Germany, with Sri Lanka Government's Petroleum Corporation – Dubious & Illegal?, AuthorHouse, ISBN 978-1-4567-7204-8
- Ameresekere, Nihal Sri (2011), IMF, World Bank & ADB Agenda on Privatisation – Sri Lanka Insurance Privatisation, handled by PricewaterhouseCoopers and Ernst & Young – Annulled as Unlawful & Illegal by Supreme Court, AuthorHouse, ISBN 978-1-4567-7808-8
- Ameresekere, Nihal Sri (2011), IMF, World Bank & ADB Agenda on Privatisation – Colombo Port Bunkering Privatisation – Annulled as Illegal & Fraudulent by Supreme Court, AuthorHouse, ISBN 978-1-4567-7293-2
- Ameresekere, Nihal Sri (2011), IMF, World Bank & ADB Agenda on Privatisation – Pillage of the Plantations in Sri Lanka, AuthorHouse, ISBN 978-1-4520-6260-0
- Ameresekere, Nihal Sri (2011), Transparency & Public Accountability – Fiscal Mismanagement & Lack of Public Accountability – Case Study – Sri Lanka, a Country under the Purview of IMF, World Bank, ADB, AuthorHouse, ISBN 978-1-4567-8283-2
- Ameresekere, Nihal Sri (2011), UN Convention Against Corruption – To Combat Fraud & Corruption – a Cancerous Menace, with mere Rhetoric, subverts UN Convention, AuthorHouse, ISBN 978-1-4567-9673-0
- Ameresekere, Nihal Sri (2011), Colombo Hilton Hotel Construction – Fraud on Sri Lanka Government – Criminality Exposed, but Perversely Covered-up, AuthorHouse, ISBN 978-1-4670-1100-6
- Ameresekere, Nihal Sri (2011), IMF, World Bank & ADB Agenda on Privatisation – 'Dubious Deals' in Sri Lanka – What a Paradox!, AuthorHouse, ISBN 978-1-4678-8733-5
- Ameresekere, Nihal Sri (2011), Settlement of a Fraud – Colombo Hilton Hotel Construction – Fraud on Sri Lanka Government, AuthorHouse, ISBN 978-1-4678-9720-4
- Ameresekere, Nihal Sri (2012), Overseas Corporate Structures, which Hide Real Owners – Foreign Business Empire of a Sri Lankan Entrepreneur?, AuthorHouse, ISBN 978-1-4772-1508-1
- Ameresekere, Nihal Sri (2012), Socio-Political Realities – Hilton Hotel Fiasco & Ad Hominem Legislation – Expropriation Law: Fraud on the State & the People! Lame duck Political Leaders? Abuse of Legislative process! Judicial Independence & Bias?, AuthorHouse, ISBN 978-1-4772-1393-3
- Ameresekere, Nihal Sri (2013), Politics, Justice & the Rule of Law – Presidential & General Elections 2010 Political Realities, AuthorHouse, ISBN 978-1-48178-176-3
