= 2025 in Sri Lanka =

- Decades: 2000s; 2010s; 2020s
- See also: Other events of 2025; Timeline of Sri Lankan history

The following lists notable events that took place during the year 2025 in Sri Lanka.

== Incumbents ==
=== National ===
| President | Prime Minister | Speaker | Chief Justice | Opposition Leader |
| Anura Kumara Dissanayake (Age 57) | Harini Amarasuriya (Age 55) | Jagath Wickramaratne (Age 57) | Padman Surasena | Sajith Premadasa (Age 58) |
|---|---|---|---|---|
| National People's Power (since 23 September 2024) | National People's Power (since 24 September 2024) | National People's Power (since 17 December 2024) | Independent (since 27 July 2025) | Samagi Jana Balawegaya (since 3 January 2020) |

Former

Chief Justice
Murdu Fernando
(Age 65)
Independent
(until 27 July 2025)

=== Provincial ===
Governors

- Central Province – Sarath Abeykoon
- Eastern Province – Jayantha Lal Ratnasekera
- North Central Province – Wasantha Kumara Wimalasiri
- Northern Province – N. Vedanayagam
- North Western Province – Tissa Kumarasiri
- Sabaragamuwa Province – Champa Janaki Rajaratne
- Southern Province – Bandula Harischandra (died 16 November 2025)
- Uva Province – Kapila Jayasekera
- Western Province – Hanif Yusuf

== Events ==
- Cyclone Ditwah
- Operation Yukthiya
- Red Sea crisis
  - Operation Prosperity Guardian

== Events by month ==
=== January ===
- 1 January – The "Clean Sri Lanka" national initiative commences under the patronage of President Anura Kumara Dissanayake.
- 9 January – General Secretary of the Bodu Bala Sena Ven. Galagoda Aththe Gnanasara Thero is sentenced to nine months' imprisonment over defamatory statements against Islam.
- 10 January – Former Sri Lankan Ambassador to Russia Udayanga Weeratunga is arrested by the Mirihana Police for allegedly assaulting his neighbor.
- 13 January – "Amba Yaalu", the first 100% female-staffed tourist hotel in Sri Lanka is opened in Kandalama, Dambulla.
- 16 January
  - The government announces an agreement with Chinese state oil company Sinopec valued at $3.7 billion to construct a "state-of-the-art oil refinery" with a capacity of 200,000 barrels in Hambantota.
  - Sri Lankan underworld figure and drug kingpin Janith Madushanka, alias "Podi Lassie", is arrested in Mumbai, India.
- 19 January – Former Minister Gamini Vijith Vijithamuni Soysa is arrested by the Walana Anti-Vice Unit regarding an illegally-assembled lorry.
- 20 January – The Gal Oya Dam is breached in the Nena Kaadu area in Ampara, resulting in moderate flooding.
- 22 January – Former Minister Anura Priyadharshana Yapa and his wife are arrested by the Criminal Investigation Department (CID) over allegations of misuse of funds amounting to over Rs. 6.1 million in 2014.
- 24 January – Four Sri Lankan cricketers are named in the ICC ODI Team of the Year 2024, with Charith Asalanka as captain of the team and Kusal Mendis as the wicketkeeper, as well as Pathum Nissanka and Wanindu Hasaranga. Meanwhile, Kamindu Mendis is included in the ICC Test Team of the Year 2024 and Matheesha Pathirana in the ICC T20I Team of the Year 2024. Sri Lanka women's cricketer Chamari Athapaththu is also included in the ICC Women's T20I Team of the Year 2024 as the captain. Kamindu is later awarded as the ICC Men's Emerging Cricketer of the Year.
- 25 January – Yoshitha Rajapaksa, son of former president Mahinda Rajapaksa, is arrested by the Criminal Investigation Department (CID) for committed offences under the Prevention of Money Laundering Act No. 5 of 2006.
- 26 January – The "Eagle's Viewpoint", the highest permanent settlement in Sri Lanka with an altitude of 6,182 feet above sea level in the Nuwara Eliya District, is opened to tourists.
- 28 January – Johann Peries becomes the first Sri Lankan to reach the summit of Mount Vinson, the highest mountain in Antarctica at 4,892 metres.
- 29 January – Jaffna District MP Ramanathan Archchuna is arrested over allegedly obstructing the duties of police personnel in Anuradhapura.
- 31 January – Ishadi Amanda becomes the first runner-up at the 40th Mrs. World pageant held in Las Vegas, United States.

=== February ===
- 4 February – The 77th National Independence Day is celebrated at the Independence Memorial Hall in Colombo with the theme "Let's Join the National Renaissance".
- 6 February – Sri Lankan scientist Prof. Neelika Malavige is appointed as the president-elect of the International Society for Infectious Diseases (ISID), where she will assume the presidency in 2027 and serve until 2029.
- 8 February – Sri Lanka Muslim Congress (SLMC) Batticaloa District MP M. S. Naleem is assaulted by a supporter of the Sri Lanka Mahajana Pakshaya (SLMP) and is admitted to the Eravur Hospital.
- 9 February – An issue at an electricity sub-station near Colombo leads to a nationwide power outage. Officials blame the incident on a monkey entering the grid transformer.
- 10 February
  - The new train service 'Ella Odyssey Nanu Oya' starts operations from Nanu Oya to Badulla.
  - Sigiriya is nominated as the world's most welcoming city for 2025 by Booking.com, in the "10 Most Welcoming Cities on Earth for 2025" based on over 360 million of its verified customer reviews.
- 11 February – Convenor of the Nawa Sinhale National Movement Dan Priyasad is arrested and remanded by Sri Lanka Police for an investigation over an alleged incident of forcing the Nan Eriya Police OIC not to arrest a drug trafficker in 2024.
- 13 February – Former Eelam People's Democratic Party (EPDP) MP Kulasingam Thileepan is arrested by the 'Q Branch' of the Tamil Nadu Police for allegedly obtaining an Indian passport using fake address proof documents.
- 17 February – The 2025 Budget is presented to Parliament by President Anura Kumara Dissanayake.
- 18 February – Former Puttalam District MP Shantha Abeysekara and his son are arrested by the Police Illegal Assets Investigations Division due to an illegally assembled vehicle.
- 19 February – Notorious drug trafficker and organised criminal "Ganemulla Sanjeewa" is shot dead at the Aluthkade Courts Complex by an assailant disguised as an attorney.
- 20 February – An express train collides with a herd of elephants near a wildlife reserve in Habarana and derails, killing six of the animals.
- 26 February – The first Shell branded fuel station in Sri Lanka opens at B.S. Cooray Filling Station, Ambathale.

=== March ===
- 3 March – Sri Lankan massage therapist Praneeth Lasantha wins the silver medal at the 2025 Universal Massage Championship in Thailand from 80 competitors from 21 countries, becoming the first Sri Lankan to win the title.
- 5 March – Daisy Forest, the mother-in-law of former president Mahinda Rajapaksa is arrested in connection with investigations into a money laundering case. In the evening, Former Minister Mervyn Silva is arrested by the Criminal Investigation Department (CID) and remanded until March 17.
- 9 March – Sri Lankan cricketer Ashen Bandara is arrested by the Piliyandala Police for allegedly assaulting a person after entering their house.
- 14 March
  - Sri Lanka Muslim Congress (SLMC) MP M. S. Naleem resigns from his parliamentary seat to contest in the upcoming local elections for the Eravur Urban Council. He is the first resignation of the 17th Parliament of Sri Lanka.
  - Sri Lankan rapper and singer ‘Shan Putha’ is arrested by the Homagama Police for possession of a 9mm firearm.
- 16 March – Kandy Sports Club wins the 2024–25 Mastercard Inter-Club 'A' Division Rugby League, securing the domestic inter-club rugby title.
- 17 March – The 2024 (2025) G.C.E. Ordinary Level (O/L) examination commences at 3,663 centres across the island, with 398,182 school candidates and 75,965 private candidates.
- 21 March – A K-8 trainer aircraft of the Sri Lanka Air Force crashes near Minuwangete in the Wariyapola area. Both pilots eject safely and are uninjured.
- 22 March – Two individuals: Yomesh Nadishan and Pasidu Tharuka, are killed in a shooting incident on Sinhasana Road, in front of the southern entrance of the Devundara Sri Vishnu Devalaya.
- 25 March – Former State Minister Sathasivam Viyalendran is arrested by the Commission to Investigate Allegations of Bribery or Corruption (CIABOC) after allegedly aiding and abetting the soliciting of a bribe.
- 27 March – New Democratic Front (NDF) Badulla District parliamentarian Chamara Sampath Dassanayake is arrested by the Bribery Commission in relation to an irregularity that occurred during his tenure as the Chief Minister of Uva Province.
- 29 March
  - "Wild Cookbook", a YouTube channel run by Sri Lankan chef and YouTuber Charith N. Silva, becomes the first Sri Lankan channel to surpass 10 million subscribers.
  - Sri Lankan powerlifter Ransilu Jayathilake wins the gold medal in the 120 kg weight class at the 2025 Asia Pacific Powerlifting Championships.

=== April ===
- 1 April – Underworld figure K. M. Sarath Bandara is sentenced to death by the Colombo High Court after being found guilty of shooting and killing a man in the Borella area in 2014.
- 2 April
  - Former Chief Minister of the North Central Province S. M. Ranjith and his private secretary Shanthi Chandrasena are sent to prison for 16 years of rigorous imprisonment over corruption charges.
  - Ven. Rajangane Saddharathana Thero is expelled from the Sangha community by the Working Committee of Sri Lanka Ramanna Maha Nikaya following his continuous controversial statements on social media.
- 4 April – Indian Prime Minister Narendra Modi arrives in Sri Lanka for a three-day state visit.
- 5 April – Sri Lankan tri-forces personnel, including medical staff, depart for Myanmar on a special flight to provide relief assistance to victims of the country's recent earthquake.
- 6 April – Kandy Sports Club wins the 2025 Clifford Cup inter-club knockout rugby tournament, defeating Ceylonese Rugby & Football Club (CR & FC) 41–33 in the final held at Nittawela Rugby Stadium, Kandy, to complete the domestic double for the 2024–25 season.
- 8 April
  - The ‘Calypso tourist train’ designed by Sri Lanka Railways makes its inaugural journey from the Nanu Oya railway station to the Demodara railway station.
  - Former State Minister and leader of the Tamil Makkal Viduthalai Pulikal (TMVP) Sivanesathurai Chandrakanthan alias ‘Pillayan’ is arrested by CID.
- 10 April – The Vasavilan–Palaly road is officially reopened to the public, after being closed for 34 years due to the Sri Lankan civil war.
- 18 April – A special exposition of the Sacred Tooth Relic, titled “Siri Dalada Wandanawa”, begins at the Temple of the Tooth in Kandy. The exposition would go on for 10 days.
- 19 April – Tharushi Abisheka wins the gold medal in the women's 800m at the 2025 Asian U18 Athletics Championships in Dammam, Saudi Arabia. Shavindu Awishka and Pawan Nethya Sampath wins bronze medals in the men's 800m and high jump, respectively.
- 21 April – The Vatican recognises 167 Catholics who died in the 2019 Sri Lanka Easter bombings as "witnesses of faith".
- 22 April – Dan Priyasad, a Sri Lanka Podujana Peramuna (SLPP) candidate for the Kolonnawa Urban Council, is shot and killed by two individuals.
- 24 April – American rock band Boyce Avenue arrives in Sri Lanka, ahead of their first concert in Sri Lanka.
- 27 April–11 May – The 2025 Sri Lanka Women's Tri-Nation Series is held. It is the first to be hosted by Sri Lanka. In the final, India defeats Sri Lanka by 97 runs to win the series.
- 29 April
  - Dilshi Amshika, a 15 or 16-year old Tamil schoolgirl, commits suicide following alleged sexual and psychological abuse by a teacher at her former school. The incident sparks public outrage and renews discussion over child protection in Sri Lanka.
  - Sri Lanka Cricket terminates the Lanka Premier League (LPL) franchise partnerships of the Colombo Strikers and Jaffna Kings due to the failure to fulfill their contractual obligations.

=== May ===
- 3 May – President Anura Kumara Dissanayake departs for Vietnam on the invitation of Vietnamese President Lương Cường.
- 4 May
  - Notorious underworld criminal Sujeewa Ruwankumara De Silva alias ‘Loku Pattie’ is brought back to Sri Lanka from Belarus.
  - Squadron Leader Nishadi Pieris is awarded the United Nations Peacekeepers’ Medal as a Military Observer, becoming the first female officer of the Sri Lanka Air Force (SLAF) to achieve the feat.
- 5 May – Sri Lankan musical group ‘Knights’ become the runners-up of the “Battle of the Bands – International” competition held in India.
- 6 May – 2025 Sri Lankan local elections: Over 17 million voters elect members to 339 local authorities in Sri Lanka. The ruling National People's Power emerges as the largest party, winning 3,927 out of the 8,793 available seats and securing 43.26% of all votes.
- 8 May
  - Samantha Ranasinghe is sworn in as a Member of Parliament representing the Kegalle Electoral District, replacing Kosala Jayaweera, who died on 6 April.
  - About 15 Sri Lankans are rescued and repatriated after being trafficked and forcibly employed in cybercrime centers in Myawaddy, Myanmar.
- 9 May
  - A Bell 212 helicopter of the Sri Lanka Air Force crashes into the Maduru Oya Reservoir. Twelve individuals were on board, including two pilots. Six personnel were killed in the incident, comprising four from the Sri Lanka Army and two from the Air Force.
  - SriLankan Cargo, the air freight arm of SriLankan Airlines secures the CEIV Lithium Batteries Certification (Center of Excellence for Independent Validators – Lithium Batteries) from the International Air Transport Association (IATA), becoming the first South Asian airline cargo division to achieve the feat.
- 11 May – Twenty-one people are killed and 14 more injured when a bus carrying Buddhist pilgrims in Kotmale careens off a cliff near Gerandi Ella.
- 15 May – YouTube channel ‘Wild Cookbook’ by Sri Lankan chef and YouTube content creator Charith N. Silva is featured in the Forbes 30 Under 30: The Arts” list for the year 2025.
- 18 May – Isipathana College wins the 2025 President's Trophy inter-school knockout rugby tournament, defeating Trinity College 12–9 in the final held at Royal College Sports Complex, Colombo.
- 19 May – Former Sri Lanka Podujana Peramuna (SLPP) MP Milan Jayathilaka is arrested for an alleged irregularity related to the approval of a property plan.
- 21 May – Former international cricketer Ramith Rambukwella is arrested following an ongoing investigation linked to his father, former Minister Keheliya Rambukwella.
- 23 May
  - Former minister Duminda Dissanayake is arrested by the Terrorism Investigation Division (TID) of the Sri Lanka Police in connection with the ownership of a gold-plated T-56 assault rifle discovered at an apartment complex in Havelock Town, Colombo on 20 May.
  - Ven. Ampitiye Sumanarathana Thero, the Chief Incumbent of Sri Mangalarama Viharaya in Batticaloa, is arrested following an incident of disorderly conduct at the Ampara Police Station.
- 24 May
  - Winston Peters, the deputy prime minister and minister of foreign affairs of New Zealand, arrives in Sri Lanka on a four-day official visit.
  - Wildlife rangers of Sri Lanka are featured in the BBC documentary series ‘Guardians’, launched by Prince William and The Royal Foundation’s United for Wildlife.
- 28 May – Radosław Sikorski, the minister of foreign affairs of Poland, arrives in Sri Lanka on a four-day official visit, representing Kaja Kallas, the vice-president of the European Commission and high representative of the union for foreign affairs and security policy. The visit also coincides with Poland's current presidency of the council of the European Union.
- 29 May – The Permanent High Court Trial-at-Bar of Colombo convicts former ministers Mahindananda Aluthgamage and Nalin Fernando in a corruption case related to the importation of sports equipment. Aluthgamage receives a sentence of 20 years of rigorous imprisonment while Fernando receives a 25-year sentence.

=== June ===
- 1 June – The Galapitamada area where the endangered Bandula Barb lives is declared as a conservation zone.
- 2 June
  - The formation and activities of 161 out of 339 local councils, following the 2025 Sri Lankan local elections, commences. This applies only to councils in which a political party or an independent group secured a clear majority.
  - Richard Marles, the deputy prime minister and minister of defence of Australia, arrives in Sri Lanka on a two-day official visit.
- 5 June – The Attorney General indicts former national cricketer Sachithra Senanayake on charges related to match-fixing during the 2020 Lanka Premier League.
- 8 June – Taiwan Athletics Open Championship 2025: Chamod Mahinsasa Yodhasinghe wins third place in the Men’s 100m event with a time of 10.38 seconds. Whereas Nadeesha Lekamge wins the silver medal in the women’s javelin throw event with a season’s best performance of 56.62 meters.
- 9 June
  - The cabinet of ministers decides to suspend Commissioner General of Prisons Thushara Upuldeniya in connection with an investigation into allegations that an inmate at Anuradhapura Prison was unlawfully released under the presidential pardon scheme in May 2025. The Criminal Investigation Department (CID) of Sri Lanka Police subsequently arrests Upuldeniya in relation to the same matter.
  - Sri Lanka Cricket Awards 2024: Kamindu Mendis is awarded as the Men’s Cricketer of the Year, Chamari Athapaththu as the Women’s Cricketer of the Year and Janith Liyanage as the Emerging Player of the Year.
- 19 June – Manhunt International: Piyumal Sithum Pattuwearachchi wins First Runner-Up at the 23rd edition held in Bangkok, Thailand.
- 15 June – Vishmitha Divyanja wins Mister Fitness Supermodel World 2025 title at the grand finale held in Ho Chi Minh City, Vietnam.
- 19 June – Nalin Abeysooriya is appointed as the 52nd president of the Court of Appeal by President Dissanayake with the consent of the Constitutional Council.
- 20 June – National People's Power (NPP) MP Harshana Suriyapperuma resigns from both his parliamentary seat and his deputy ministerial post in order to assume duties as secretary to the Ministry of Finance.
- 23 June – Volker Türk, the United Nations High Commissioner for Human Rights, arrives in Sri Lanka on a three-day official visit.
- 20 June – Actress Jacqueline Fernandez honored at the ongoing Italian Global Series Festival 2025.
- 26 June
  - Thabo Mbeki, the second democratically elected president of South Africa, arrives in Sri Lanka on a public engagement visit.
  - Former secretary to the Health Ministry, Janaka Chandragupta, is arrested to record a statement regarding the alleged procurement of substandard drugs.
- 27 June – Former chairman of SriLankan Airlines, Nishantha Wickramasinghe is arrested for an ongoing investigation into three separate allegations of corruption related to decisions taken during his tenure.

=== July ===
- 2 July – Starlink launches internet services in Sri Lanka.
- 4 July – Former MP and cabinet minister S. M. Chandrasena is arrested by the Commission to Investigate Allegations of Bribery or Corruption (CIABOC) in connection with an allegation of misappropriating Rs. 25 million worth of maize seeds during the run-up to the 2015 Sri Lankan presidential election.
- 7 July – Colombo Dockyard announces a strategic investment agreement with Mazagon Dock Shipbuilders of India.
- 8 July – Abdul Wazeeth is sworn in as a Member of Parliament from the National list, replacing M. S. Naleem who had earlier resigned from his seat on 14 March.
- 9 July – Nishantha Jayaweera is sworn in as a Member of Parliament from the National list, replacing Harshana Suriyapperuma who had earlier resigned from his seat on 20 June.
- 24 July – The X-Press Feeders container shipping group, based in Singapore, and its local agent, Sea Consortium Lanka Pvt. Ltd., are ordered by the Supreme Court of Sri Lanka to pay US$1 billion in compensation to the Government of Sri Lanka for the environmental and economic damage caused by the fire onboard the vessel X-Press Pearl in May 2021.
- 25 July – Lieutenant Koyan Chamitha of the Sri Lanka Navy successfully completes the Basic Underwater Demolition/SEAL (BUD/S) training conducted by the United States Navy and earns the SEAL Trident. He is the first Sri Lankan to achieve this distinction.
- 27 July – Padman Surasena is appointed as the 49th Chief Justice of Sri Lanka by President Dissanayake with the consent of the Constitutional Council.

=== August ===
- 1 August – City of Dreams Sri Lanka is opened to the public. This US$1 billion joint venture between John Keells Holdings and Melco Resorts & Entertainment of Hong Kong is South Asia's first fully integrated resort.
- 2 August – Trinity College wins the 2025 Dialog Schools Rugby League, securing the domestic inter-school rugby title with one game remaining.
- 5 August – Deshabandu Tennakoon is removed from office as the Inspector General of Police by a resolution passed in the Parliament of Sri Lanka, with 177 members voting in favour, none against and one abstaining.
- 6 August
  - Shasheendra Rajapaksa, former MP and state minister, is arrested by the Commission to Investigate Allegations of Bribery or Corruption (CIABOC) in connection with an alleged incident of misappropriating government funds paid out as compensation.
  - Samantha Mostyn, the Governor-General of Australia, arrives in Sri Lanka on a three-day official visit.
- 8 August – Yevan David signs with AIX Racing to compete in the 2026 FIA Formula 3 Championship, becoming the first Sri Lankan to compete in the series.
- 13 August – Priyantha Weerasooriya is appointed as the 37th Inspector General of Police by President Dissanayake with the consent of the Constitutional Council.
- 19 August
  - The Sri Lankan aviation unit in Bria, deployed under the United Nations Multidimensional Integrated Stabilization Mission in the Central African Republic (MINUSCA) receives an official commendation for successfully executing a high-risk casualty evacuation (CASEVAC) mission on 14 June 2025.
  - National Anti-Doping Organization (NADO) of Sri Lanka is declared as non-compliant by the World Anti-Doping Agency (WADA).
- 22 August – Ranil Wickremesinghe, former President of Sri Lanka, is arrested by the Criminal Investigation Department (CID) of the Sri Lanka Police in connection with allegations of misappropriation of state funds.
- 26 August – Former president Ranil Wickremesinghe is granted bail after being arrested four days prior and is subsequently admitted to the Colombo National Hospital due to health complications.
- 28 August – Narampanawe Ananda Thero is elected as the deputy chief incumbent of the Asgiriya chapter of the Siam Nikaya, replacing Anamaduwe Dhammadassi Thero, who died on 20 July 2025.
- 29 August
  - Nimal Lanza, former MP and state minister, is arrested by the Sri Lanka Police in connection with allegations of assault and trespassing during a protest in 2006. He is subsequently remanded till 12 September by the Negombo magistrate.
  - Rajitha Senaratne, former MP and cabinet minister, is arrested after surrendering to the court and is ordered to be remanded till 9 September by the Colombo chief magistrate, in connection with allegations that he was responsible for causing losses exceeding Rs. 20 million to the government through the awarding of a tender for a sand mining project.
  - Athuraliye Rathana Thero, former MP, is arrested after surrendering to the court and is ordered by the Nugegoda magistrate to be remanded until 12 September, in connection with allegations of abducting and detaining a person in 2020.
- 30 August – United Petroleum of Australia withdraws from Sri Lanka's fuel retail market.

=== September ===
- 1 September
  - CEAT Limited announces a US$171 million investment in Sri Lanka with the acquisition of Camso from Michelin. Camso, a manufacturer and supplier of products for off-road vehicles, operates two manufacturing plants in the country.
  - Sri Lanka Cricket commences construction of the Jaffna International Cricket Stadium in Mandaitivu, Jaffna.
- 3 September – Maria Tripodi, the undersecretary of the Ministry of Foreign Affairs of Italy, arrives in Sri Lanka on a three-day official visit.
- 4 September – A bus accident near Wellawaya results in 15 fatalities and left 16 others injured after the vehicle plunged off a cliff.
- 6 September – The government begins construction of the US$140 million Rividanavi Solar Power Park in Kotiyagala, Monaragala District, marking the country's largest renewable energy project to date.
- 9 September – Browns Investments PLC, through its subsidiary Browns Ari Resort (Private) Limited, enters into a sale and purchase agreement (SPA) with ASB Hotel Properties Maldives Ltd. for the sale of the Barceló Whale Lagoon Maldives resort at Fenfushi, Alif Dhaalu Atoll, for US$57.5 million.
- 10 September – Parliament votes 151–1 to abolish benefits and allowances granted to former presidents of Sri Lanka.
- 17 September – The Sobadhanavi Power Station, an LNG-fired plant, comes into full operation, supplying 350 MW of electricity to the national grid.
- 22 September – Admiral Dinesh Kumar Tripathi, Chief of the Naval Staff of the Indian Navy, arrives in Sri Lanka on a four-day official visit.
- 24 September
  - HSBC Sri Lanka enters into a sale and purchase agreement to sell its retail banking business in Sri Lanka to Nations Trust Bank in a deal valued at Rs. 18 billion plus taxes (approximately US$60 million).
  - Eight Buddhist monks die in a cable car accident at Na Uyana Aranya near Kurunegala, when the cable of the funicular they were travelling in fail, causing the car to crash.
- 29 September – Ramanathan Archchuna, MP for Jaffna Electoral District, is arrested by the Sri Lanka Police in connection with an investigation into charges of obstructing police duty.
- 30 September – The 2025 Women's Cricket World Cup, jointly hosted by India and Sri Lanka, commences.

=== October ===
- 3 October – The Sri Lankan government issues a Notice of Assignment (NoA) for the 5G spectrum auction.
- 8 October – Parliament passes the Convention against Doping in Sport (Amendment) Bill, which amends the Convention against Doping in Sport Act, No. 33 of 2013 and comes into effect as the Convention against Doping in Sport (Amendment) Act, No. 21 of 2025 aligning Sri Lanka's anti-doping laws in line with international standards.
- 9 October – The Office of Foreign Assets Control (OFAC) of the United States Department of the Treasury (USDT) impose sanctions on SLOGAL Energy DMCC, a subsidiary of LAUGFS Gas, for allegedly trading in Iranian-origin petrochemical products.
- 10 October – President Dissanayake carries out a cabinet reshuffle, with new appointments and changes affecting three cabinet ministers and ten deputy ministers.
- 12 October – Tedros Adhanom Ghebreyesus, the Director-General of the World Health Organization, arrives in Sri Lanka to participate as the chief guest at the 78th South-East Asia Regional Health Summit, held in Colombo from 13 to 15 October.
- 19 October – Yevan David secures second place overall in the 2025 Euroformula Open Championship and also win the Rookies' championship.
- 22 October
  - Lasantha Wickramasekara, chairman of the Weligama Pradeshiya Sabha and a member of the Samagi Jana Balawegaya (SJB), is shot and killed by two individuals.
  - Sri Lanka Cricket postpones the 2025 Lanka Premier League, which was scheduled to take place from 27 November to 23 December, and decides to reschedule the tournament for a later date.
- 23 October – Lahiru Achintha wins the gold medal in the boys' 1,500m athletics event at the 2025 Asian Youth Games held in Bahrain, while Nethmi Gimhani Pulle wins the bronze medal in the girls' 1,500m event.
- 24 October – Four people are killed and over 21,000 others are affected during heavy rains across the country.
- 25 October
  - Shanuka Costa, Chathura Dulanjana Jayathissa and Kaya Daluwatte win bronze medals in the boys' 400m, javelin throw and girls' individual golf events respectively at the 2025 Asian Youth Games held in Bahrain.
  - Sri Lanka signs the United Nations Convention against Cybercrime (UNCC).
- 26 October – Dilni Rajapaksha wins the bronze medal in the girls' triple jump event, while Sri Lanka wins the silver medal in the boys' medley relay event at the 2025 Asian Youth Games held in Bahrain.

=== November ===
- 3 November – Archbishop Paul Gallagher, the Secretary for Relations with States of the Holy See, arrives in Sri Lanka on a five-day official visit.
- 4 November – Saman Weerasinghe, former Sri Lankan ambassador to Russia, receives the Order of Friendship from the Russian government.
- 7 November
  - Pradeep Nilanga Dela is elected as the Diyawadana Nilame of the Sri Dalada Maligawa for a third term.
  - The National Anti-Doping Organisation of Sri Lanka (NADO) is removed from the list of signatories that are non-compliant with the World Anti-Doping Code after successfully addressing the identified non-conformities. The organisation had been declared non-compliant by the World Anti-Doping Agency (WADA) on 19 August.
- 12 November – Standard Chartered Sri Lanka enters into a binding business sale agreement to sell its local retail banking business to DFCC Bank in a deal valued at Rs. 3.7 billion (approximately US$12.1 million).
- 22 November – A rockslide in Pahala Kadugannawa near Kadugannawa kills six individuals and injures several others.
- 24 November – The High Court in Embilipitiya sentences 10 people, including three women, to death for the murder of a man in October 2011. Sri Lanka has an unofficial moratorium in place, with the last execution taking place in 1976.
- 26 November
  - LB Finance completes the acquisition of Associated Motor Finance Company PLC in a deal worth over Rs. 4.1 billion (approximately US$13.37 million).
  - INS Vikrant, the first indigenous aircraft carrier of the Indian Navy, arrives at the Port of Colombo to participate in the International Fleet Review 2025 (IFR), held as part of the 75th anniversary of the Sri Lanka Navy.
- 26–30 November – Cyclone Ditwah causes severe devastation across Sri Lanka, with heavy rainfall triggering flooding and landslides that leave at least 639 people dead and 203 missing.
- 28 November – Samagi Jana Balawegaya (SJB) MP Muhammedu Ismail resigns from his parliamentary seat.
- 29 November – The government declares a state of emergency in response to the severe flooding and landslides caused by Cyclone Ditwah and the Sri Lanka Armed Forces deploy over 25,000 personnel to provide relief.
- 30 November – A Bell 212 helicopter of the Sri Lanka Air Force engaged in disaster relief operations crash-lands in an area between Wennappuwa and Lunuwila, killing the pilot.

=== December ===
- 5 December – Marrikkar Mohamed Thahir is sworn in as a Member of Parliament from the National list, replacing Muhammedu Ismail who had earlier resigned from his seat on 28 November.
- 11 December
  - Allison Hooker, the Under Secretary of State for Political Affairs of United States, arrives in Sri Lanka on an official visit.
  - The Sri Lankan kithul tapping industry is officially inscribed on UNESCO's Representative List of the Intangible Cultural Heritage of Humanity.
- 12 December – Asoka Ranwala, MP for the Gampaha District from the National People's Power, is arrested by the police on charges of dangerous driving and failing to prevent an accident.
- 17 December – Wang Dongming, the Vice Chairperson of the Standing Committee of the National People's Congress of China, arrives in Sri Lanka on a three-day official visit.
- 18 December
  - The Sri Lankan government concludes the 5G spectrum auction, with Dialog Axiata and SLTMobitel as the sole bidders awarded spectrum licences.
  - Dialog Axiata announces the commercial launch of its 5G services.
- 19 December – SLTMobitel announces the commercial launch of its 5G services.
- 22 December
  - S. Jaishankar, the Minister of External Affairs of India, arrives in Sri Lanka on an official visit.
  - The World Bank Group releases the Global Rapid Post-Disaster Damage Estimation (GRADE) report, estimating that Cyclone Ditwah caused US$4.1 billion in damage to the country.
- 23 December – Wang Junzheng, Party Secretary of Tibet of the Chinese Communist Party (CCP), arrives in Sri Lanka with a delegation of officials on a three-day official visit.
- 26 December – Douglas Devananda, former cabinet minister and MP, is arrested by the Criminal Investigation Department (CID) in connection with an incident involving the misplacement of a firearm.
- 29 December – Sri Lankan-born Nishan Canagarajah is knighted in the 2026 New Year Honours for services to higher education.
- 30 December – Arachnologists Naruwan Dayananda and Suresh P. Benjamin identify six new spider species of the genus Utivarachna that are endemic to Sri Lanka.
- 31 December – Taavi Samaraweera becomes world number one in under-11 boys' table tennis, making him the first Sri Lankan player to top the world rankings in any age group.

== Holidays ==
Sri Lankan Holiday in 2025
| Maha Season (Northeast Monsoon) | | | First Inter-monsoon (from mid March) | Yala Season (Southwest Monsoon) (from mid April) | | | | | Second Inter-Monsoon (from mid October) | Maha Season (Northeast Monsoon) | |
| January | February | March | April | May | June | July | August | September | October | November | December |
|---|---|---|---|---|---|---|---|---|---|---|---|
| 13; Duruthu Full Moon Poya Day | 4 Independence Day | 13; Medin Full Moon Poya Day | 12; Bak Full Moon Poya Day | 1 May Day | 7 Id Ul-Alha | 10; Esala Full Moon Poya Day | 8 Nikini Full Moon Poya Day | 5 Milad un-Nabi | 6 Vap Full Moon Poya Day | 5 Il Full Moon Poya Day | 4 Unduvap Full Moon Poya Day |
| 14; Thai Pongal | 12; Navam Full Moon Poya Day | 31; Eid al-Fitr | 13; Day prior to Sinhalese & Tamil New Year Day | 12; Vesak Full Moon Poya Day | 10; Poson Full Moon Poya Day | | | 7 Binara Full Moon Poya Day | 20; Deepavali | | 25; Christmas Day |
| | 12; Maha Shivaratri Day | | 14; Sinhalese & Tamil New Year Day | 13; Day following Vesak Full Moon Poya Day | | | | | | | |
| | | | 18; Good Friday | | | | | | | | |

== Deaths ==
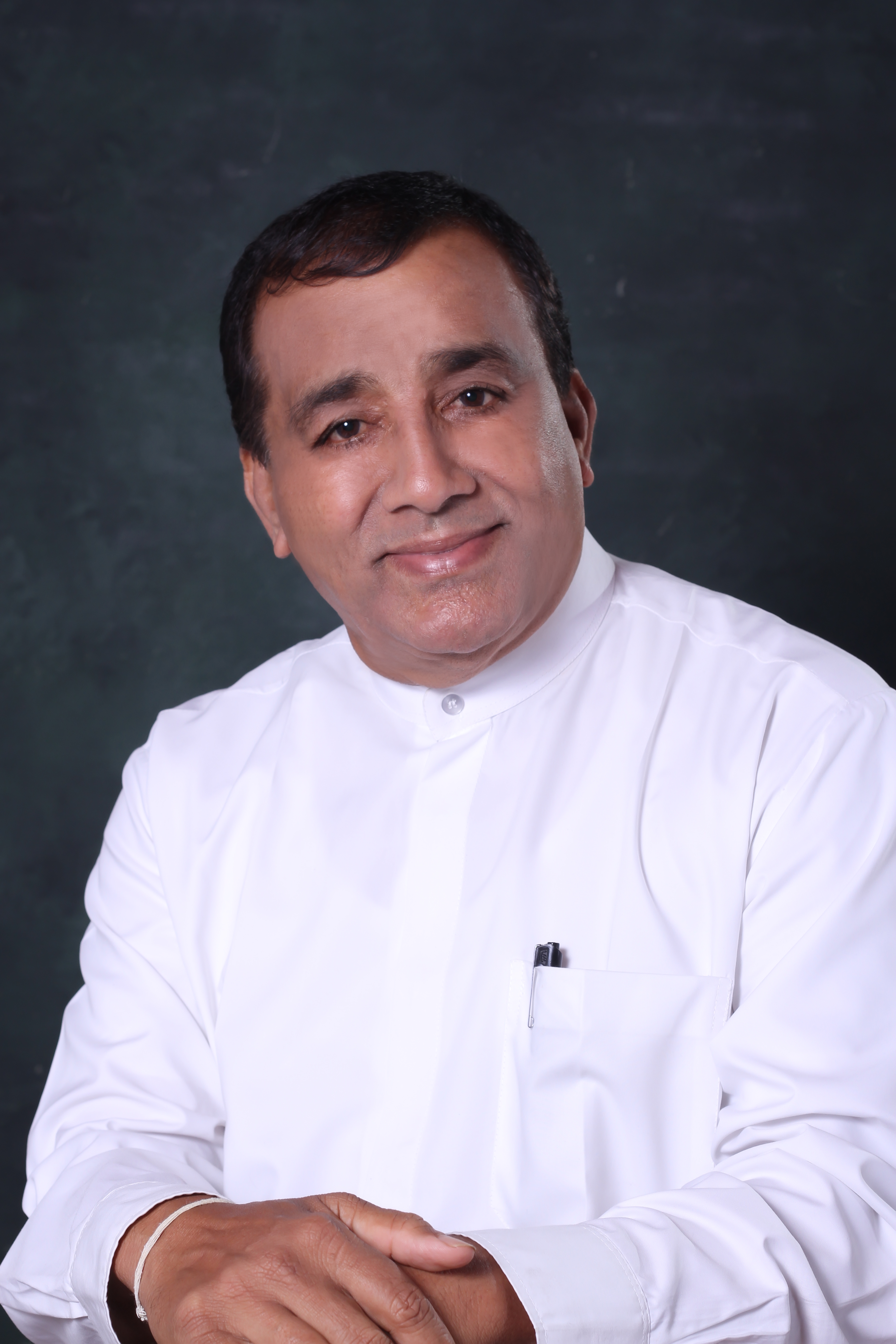
Lucky Jayawardena (b. 1955)

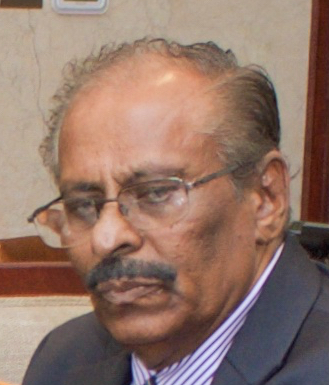
Mavai Senathirajah (b. 1942)

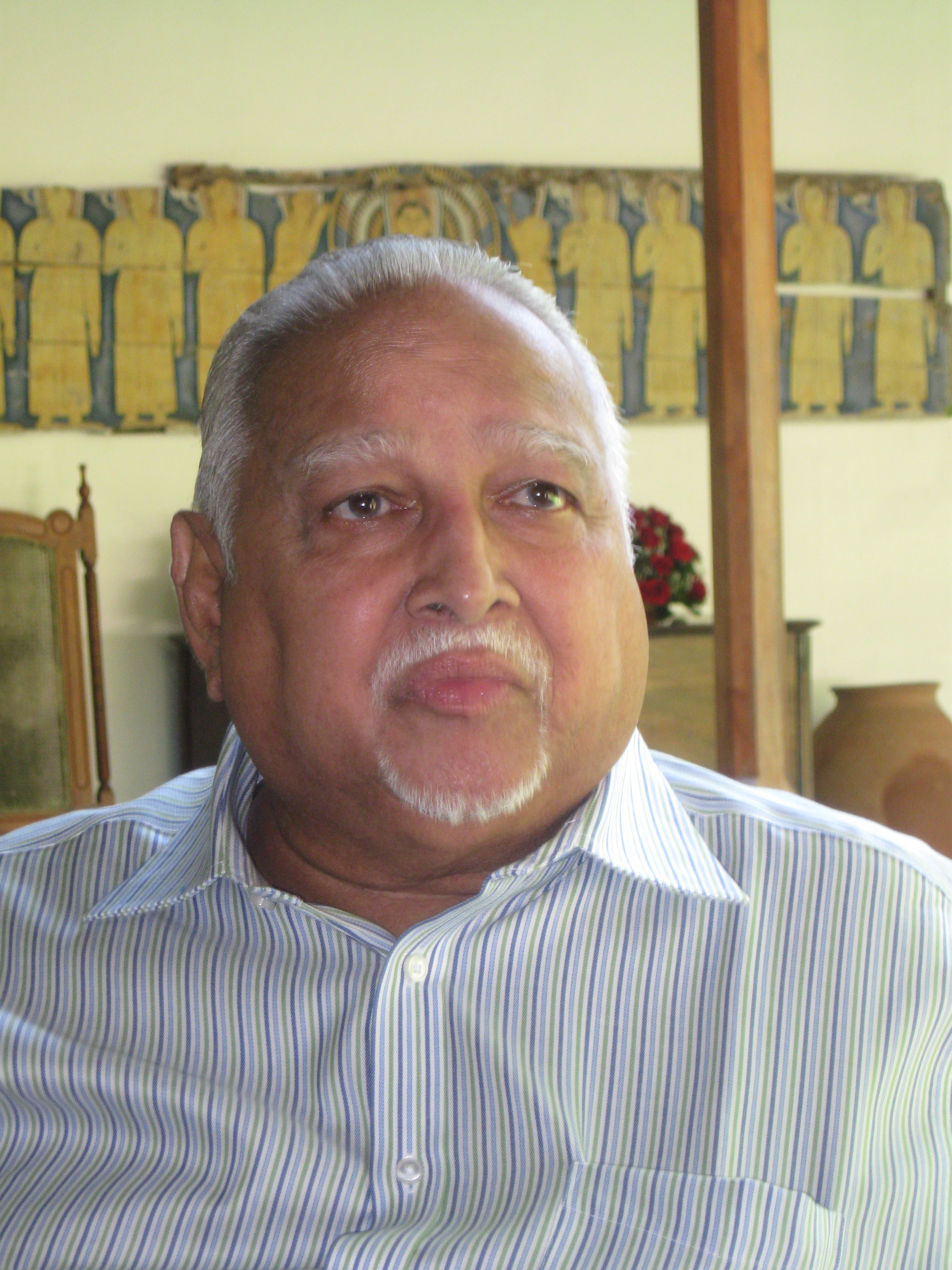
Harry Jayawardena (b. 1942)

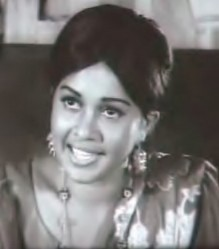
Malini Fonseka (b. 1947)

=== January ===
- 2 January – J. R. P. Suriyapperuma, 96, politician, MP (2010–2015)
- 5 January – A. A. Junaideen, 79, film director
- 8 January – Lucky Jayawardena, 70, politician, MP (1994–2004, 2015–2020)
- 11 January – Indradasa Hettiarachchi, 97, politician, MP (1977–1994)
- 17 January
  - Shiva Pasupati, 96, lawyer, attorney general (1975–1988), solicitor general (1974–1975)
  - Kulanthai Shanmugalingam, 93, playwright
- 19 January – Victor Ivan, 75, journalist
- 22 January
  - Anil Bharathi, 75, singer
  - Y. M. Sumanasiri, 81, sitarist
- 23 January – Anura Wickramasinghe, 80, journalist
- 29 January
  - Mavai Senathirajah, 82, politician, MP (1989–1994; 1999–2020), leader of the Ilankai Tamil Arasu Kachchi (2014–2024)
  - Ranjith Wickramasinghe, 65, makeup artist
- 31 January – K. B. Manawa, 87, author

=== February ===
- 1 February – Bernard Rulach, 77, cricketer
- 3 February
  - Harry Jayawardena, 82, industrialist
  - Kandiah Balendra, 85, business executive
- 10 February – Aruna Rankothge, 52, rugby player, rugby referee and coach
- 13 February – Kumari Perera, 68, actress
- 16 February
  - Inayet Akbarally, 88, business leader, co-founder of Akbar Brothers
  - Seetha Ranjani, 70, journalist
- 20 February – Amitha Wedisinghe, 82, singer
- 23 February – Santhusa Liyanage, 57, teledrama director
- 25 February – Peter Soorasena, 85, dancer
- 26 February – Wasantha Vittachchi, 69, actor, makeup artist

=== March ===
- 1 March – Susantha Chandramali, 61, actress
- 4 March – Prasanna Fonseka, 77, actor
- 7 March – Asoka Nissanka, 72, director
- 17 March – Akushla Sellayah, 67, supermodel, actress
- 25 March
  - Gananath Obeyesekere, 95, anthropologist
  - Chandralal Manamendra, 78, cinematographer
- 26 March – Wajira Kasthuri, 57, author

=== April ===
- 6 April – Kosala Jayaweera, 38, politician, MP (2024–2025)
- 22 April
  - Dan Priyasad, 39, politician
  - Nanda Weerakkody, actress
- 27 April – Saman de Silva, 69, singer
- 30 April – Malith Dinidu, 33, volleyball player national team (2018–2025)

=== May ===
- 13 May – Ariyarathna Withana, 82, director
- 19 May – Joseph Ponniah, 72, Roman Catholic prelate, auxuliary bishop of Trincomalee-Batticaloa (2008–2012), bishop of Batticaloa (2012–2024)
- 24 May
  - Malini Fonseka, 78, actress, filmmaker, politician, MP (2010–2015)
  - Nimal de Silva, 80, academic, architect
- 25 May – Erick Karunanayake, molecular biologist
- 27 May – Ayesha Weerakoon, 90, actress
- 29 May – Bandarawela Amithananda Thero, 61, Buddhist monk, founder of the Delgoda Youth Center for Dhamma
- 30 May – Aththanayake M. Herath, 73, academic, senior lecturer at the University of Peradeniya

=== June ===
- 2 June – Greta Janet de Silva, 99, singer
- 13 June – Hamilton Wanasinghe, 91, army general, 11th Commander of the Sri Lanka Army (1988–1991)
- 19 June – Somasiri Devendra, 92, naval officer, instructor, former Commandant of the Naval and Maritime Academy in Trincomalee
- 30 June – Gamini Lokuge, 82, politician, cabinet minister, MP (1983–2024)

=== July ===
- 1 July – Maureen Hingert, 88, actress, model, beauty pageant title holder
- 4 July – Rienzie T. Wijetilleke, 85, banker, former managing director and chairman of Hatton National Bank, sports administrator
- 7 July – Bradman Weerakoon, 94, civil servant
- 10 July – Ajit M. De S. Jayaratne, 85, business leader, diplomat, high commissioner to Singapore, chairman of Forbes & Walker Ltd., the Colombo Stock Exchange, the Finance Commission and the Ceylon Chamber of Commerce
- 20 July – Anamaduwe Dhammadassi Thero, 67, Buddhist monk, deputy chief incumbent of the Asgiriya chapter of the Siam Nikaya
- 21 July – Sudam Dayaratne, 53, television director
- 25 July – P. Dayaratna, 88, politician, MP (1977–2015)
- 30 July – Henry Priyashantha, 88, journalist

=== August ===
- 6 August – Lalith Dharmawardena, 75, makeup artist
- 15 August – Lohan Ratwatte, 57, politician, state minister, MP (2010–2024)

=== September ===
- 3 September – Kenneth Fernando, 93, Anglican clergyman, bishop of Colombo (1992–2001)
- 12 September – Benedict Joseph, 85, Roman Catholic priest, director of the Catholic Press and the Social Communication Centre (SCC), newspaper editor, media personality, academic
- 19 September
  - Thanmanpillai Kanagasabai, 86, politician, MP (2004–2010)
  - Karunaratne D Phillip, 85, lyricist
- 23 September – Nalin Pradeep Udawela, 56, actor, politician
- 24 September – Saliya Induruwithana, journalist
- 25 September – Prabath Kumara, 77, journalist

=== October ===
- 8 October – Chandrani Gunawardana, 82, singer
- 16 October – Jayananda Warnaweera, 64, national cricketer and sports administrator
- 22 October – Lasantha Wickramasekara, 38, politician, chairman of the Weligama Pradeshiya Sabha

=== November ===
- 12 November – Sriyanath Karalliyadde, lawyer and judge of the Court of Appeal of Sri Lanka
- 13 November – Harischandra Wijayatunga, 94, lexicographer and politician
- 16 November – Bandula Harischandra, 62, politician and governor of Southern Province
- 18 November – Chithra Kalubowila, 68, radio presenter and journalist
- 20 November – Piyasiri Nagahawatta, 90, journalist
- 21 November
  - Ranga Prabath Dharmadasa, 34, politician, chairman of the Gomarankadawala Pradeshiya Sabha
  - Mahil Munasinghe, 47, politician, chairman of the Karandeniya Pradeshiya Sabha
- 30 November
  - Chithra Balasuriya, 94, film producer
  - Punya Kathiarachchi, 79, singer

=== December ===
- 3 December – Edmund Jayasinghe, 85, actor
- 4 December – Nihal Fernando, 71, actor
- 7 December – C. Rajadurai, 98, politician, MP (1956–1989)
- 12 December – Rajan Asirwatham, 83, chartered accountant, senior partner and country head of KPMG Sri Lanka, chairman of Bank of Ceylon
- 15 December – Somachandra de Silva, 83, national cricketer and captain, and chairman of Sri Lanka Cricket (2009–2011)
- 17 December
  - Janak Mahendra Adikari, 59, politician, MP (1989–1994, 1999–2000)
  - Sarath Chandrasiri Muthukumarana, 72, politician, MP (2010–2020, 2024)
- 23 December – Sathischandra Edirisinghe, 84, actor and director
- 27 December
  - Maxi Rozairo, 77, singer, musician and performer
  - Latha Walpola, 91, singer
- 30 December – Akshu Fernando, 34, cricketer
