= Padman Surasena =

Chief Justice of Sri Lanka since 2025

The Honourable Padman Surasena
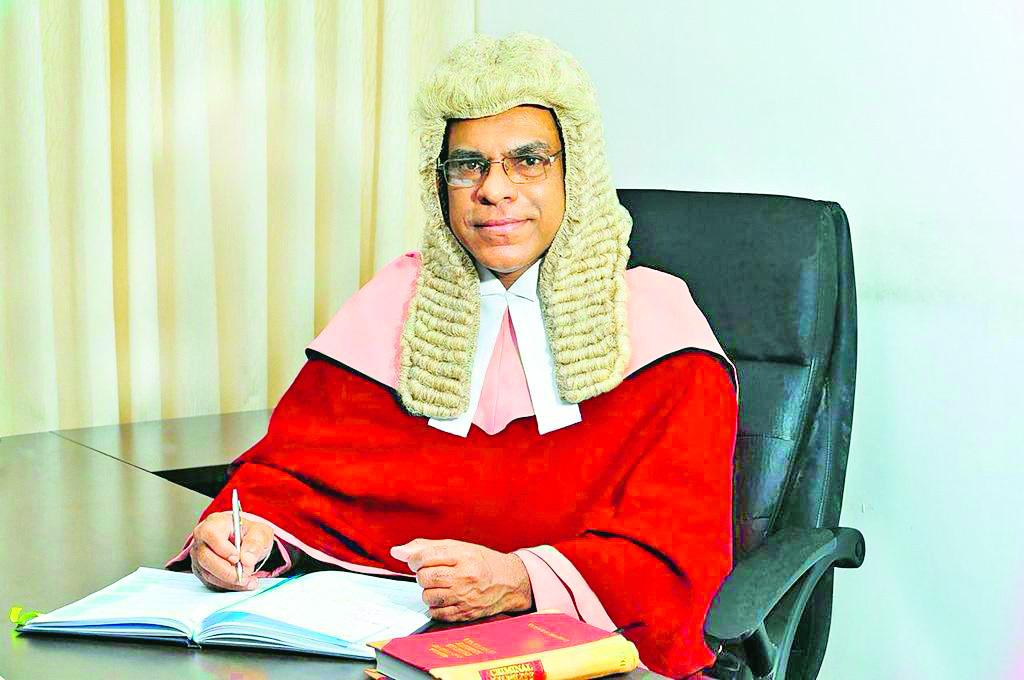
- Official Portrait 2025

49th Chief Justice of Sri Lanka
- Incumbent
- Assumed office 27 July 2025
- Appointed by: Anura Kumara Dissanayake
- Preceded by: Murdu Fernando

Puisne Justice of the Supreme Court of Sri Lanka
- In office 9 January 2019 – 27 July 2025
- Appointed by: Maithripala Sirisena

46th President of the Court of Appeal of Sri Lanka
- In office 15 January 2018 – 9 January 2019
- Appointed by: Maithripala Sirisena
- Preceded by: Lalith Dehideniya
- Succeeded by: Yasantha Kodagoda

Judge of the Court of Appeal of Sri Lanka
- In office 20 January 2016 – 15 January 2018
- Appointed by: Maithripala Sirisena

Judge of the High Court of Sri Lanka
- In office 2007 – 20 January 2016
- Appointed by: Mahinda Rajapaksa

Personal details
- Born: Preethi Padman Surasena
- Education: Sri Lanka Law College; University of Colombo (BSc)

Preethi Padman Surasena is a Sri Lankan lawyer serving since 27 July 2025 as the 49th Chief Justice of Sri Lanka. He was appointed by President Anura Kumara Dissanayake.

Surasena succeeded Murdu Fernando, who retired as the 48th chief justice on 27 July. Prior to his appointment, he served as a puisne justice (2019–2025) and as the 46th president of the Court of Appeal of Sri Lanka (2018–2019), in addition to holding other judicial appointments and serving in the Attorney General's Department.

== Early life ==
Surasena obtained his bachelor's degree in physics from the University of Colombo in 1985. He then entered the Sri Lanka Law College in the same year and was sworn in as an attorney in 1989.

== Career ==
Surasena joined the Attorney General's Department of Sri Lanka and served as a Senior State Counsel. He was appointed as a judge of the High Court of Sri Lanka in 2007 by President Mahinda Rajapaksa. On 20 January 2016, President Maithripala Sirisena nominated and appointed him as a judge of the Court of Appeal of Sri Lanka.

On 15 January 2018, he was appointed as the 46th president of the Court of Appeal by President Sirisena.

On 9 January 2019, Surasena was appointed to the Supreme Court of Sri Lanka as a puisne justice by President Sirisena.

=== Chief justice of Sri Lanka ===
On 22 July 2025, President Anura Kumara Dissanayake nominated Surasena for appointment as the next chief justice, following the retirement of Murdu Fernando on 27 July. The nomination was considered and ratified by the Constitutional Council on 23 July.

On 27 July, Surasena was sworn in as the 49th chief justice of Sri Lanka by President Dissanayake.

On 11 December 2025, during an official visit to India, Surasena was accorded a ceremonial sitting at the Supreme Court of India, led by Chief Justice Surya Kant.

=== Commission assignments ===
On 10 March 2015, President Sirisena appointed Surasena as the chairman of Presidential Commission of Inquiry to Investigate and Inquire into Serious Acts of Fraud, Corruption and Abuse of Power, State Resources and Privileges (PRECIFAC).

In January 2025, Surasena was appointed by President Anura Kumara Dissanayake as a member of the Judicial Service Commission (JSC), filling the vacancy created by the retirement of former Chief Justice Jayantha Jayasuriya. He became chairman of the commission on 27 July 2025, following the retirement of Chief Justice Murdu Fernando and his own elevation to the post.

== Allegations and controversies ==
In August 2026, opposition MPs Rohini Kaviratne, Dayasiri Jayasekara and Ajith P. Perera raised allegations in Parliament against Surasena, concerning assets acquired by his family members — including a Rs. 185 million luxury house in Colombo linked to his son — his asset declarations, and delays in judicial proceedings to recover compensation for the X-Press Pearl disaster. A complaint was subsequently lodged with the Commission to Investigate Allegations of Bribery or Corruption (CIABOC) against three Supreme Court judges, alleging their actions resulted in nearly US$999 million in X-Press Pearl compensation not being recovered; the allegations have not been established and no judge has been found guilty of wrongdoing. The Samagi Jana Balawegaya asked Speaker Jagath Wickramaratne what steps he intended to take over the allegations, and whether action would follow against those responsible if they proved false.

Legal offices
Preceded by Lalith Dehideniya	President of the Court of Appeal of Sri Lanka; 2018–2019	Succeeded by Yasantha Kodagoda
Preceded by Murdu Fernando	Chief Justice of Sri Lanka; 2025–present	Incumbent
Order of precedence
Preceded by Jagath Wickramaratne as Speaker of the Parliament	Order of precedence of Sri Lanka as Chief Justice	Succeeded by Sajith Premadasa as Leader of the Opposition
