= Environmental issues in Sri Lanka =

Location of Sri Lanka

Environmental issues in Sri Lanka include large-scale logging of forests and degradation of mangroves, coral reefs and soil. Air pollution and water pollution are challenges for Sri Lanka since both cause negative health impacts. Overfishing and insufficient waste management, especially in rural areas, leads to environmental pollution. Sri Lanka is also vulnerable to climate change impacts such as extreme weather events and sea level rise.

Industrialization and population growth are major drivers of these environmental issues. A lack of public awareness and governmental guidelines intensify the problems.

== Background ==
These environmental problems have escalated because of a high population growth and the increasing industrialization in Sri Lanka since the 1980s. The industrialization led to an increase in automobile use and energy consumption. The energy demand used to be almost covert by hydro power plants in 1988 (90%). The increased demands led to the construction of oil and coal fired thermal power plants which emit more greenhouse gases than renewable energy technologies like hydro power plants.

A lack of public awareness and participation in government policies and environmental standards has amplified the problems. However, Sri Lanka's government has undertaken several efforts to encounter environmental issues.

== Major environmental issues ==
=== Deforestation ===
Sri Lanka's central and southern parts are home to montane forests, sub-montane forests and to lowland rainforests. In contrast, sparse forests, mangroves, riverine dry forests and monsoon forests are located in the dry zone. These forest covers in Sri Lanka have been greatly reduced by legal and illegal forest clearing.

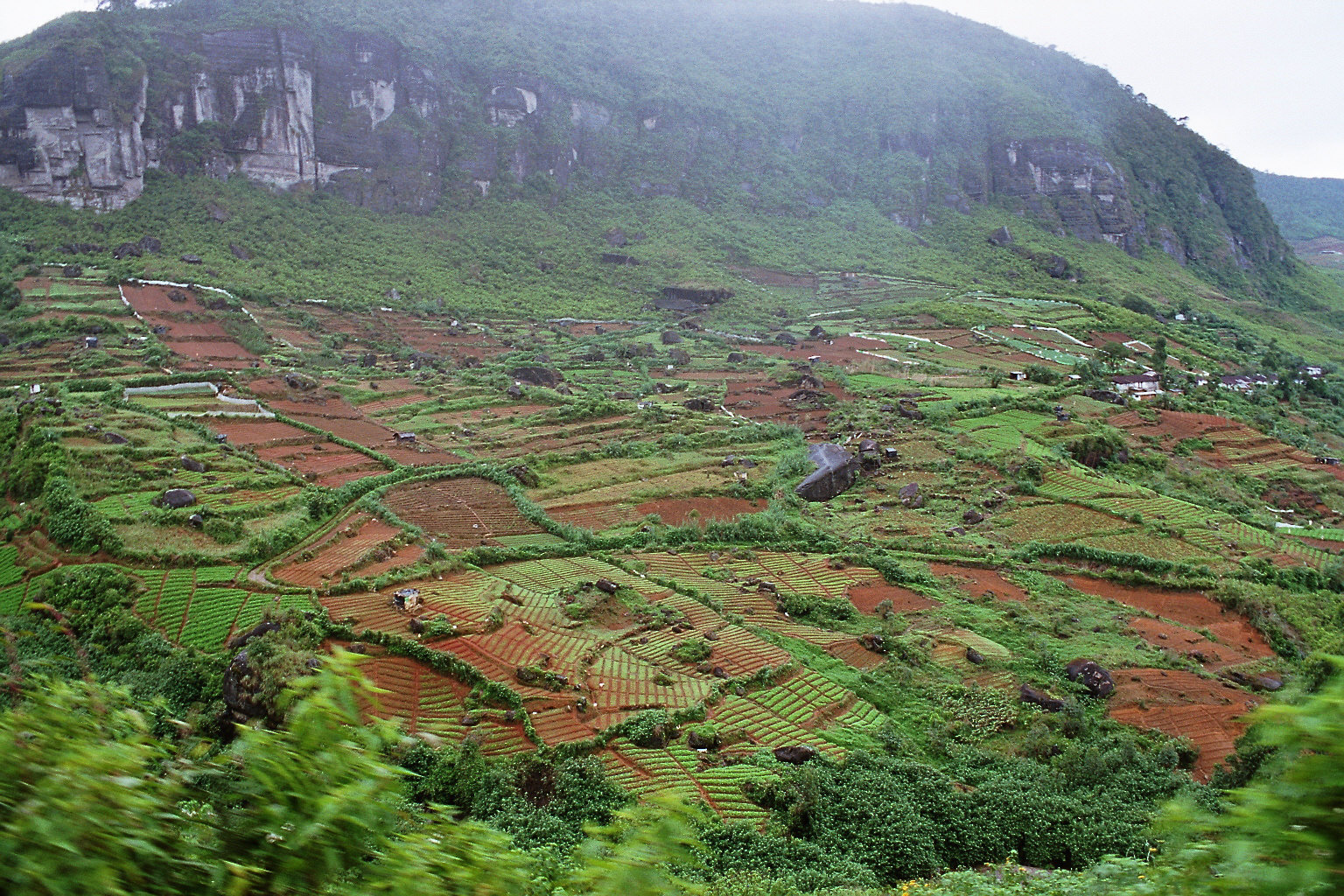
Deforestation because of a tea plantation in Sri Lanka

Due to deforestation in Sri Lanka the size of land covered by natural forests decreased from 80% in 1820 to 43% in 1948. This was partly caused by British colonialism from 1801 to 1948 which increased the amount of tea, coffee and rubber plantations. The natural forest cover further decreased to 23% in 2000. In 2010, 29% of Sri Lanka's area was covered by forests (this number includes forest plantations). Drivers of recent forest degradation are an increase in population, road construction, timber production, agricultural development and forest cleaning by private businessmen. Even though there are conservation areas, the management is partly insufficient. The extensive deforestation leads to a rise of the average surface temperature. Deforestation is also responsible for an increase in greenhouse gas emissions because trees remove CO_{2} from the air. By clear cutting areas the CO_{2} returns to the air and thereby increases the atmospheric carbon concentration.

The government of Sri Lanka has adopted the target to increase the size of land covered by forests to 32% by 2030. In order to achieve this, the government intends to reforest degraded forests, to increase urban forests, and to improve the forest plantations.

Sri Lanka had a 2018 Forest Landscape Integrity Index mean score of 5.83/10, ranking it 94th globally out of 172 countries.

=== Mangrove degradation ===
Sri Lanka's mangrove forests, small trees that grow in coastal water, have been decreased by 70% since 1915. The size of mangrove ecosystems is being reduced because of the implementation of agriculture and aquaculture systems like fisheries. Shrimp aquaculture projects are one of the biggest threats. The shrimp business is growing very fast because of high demand and high profits. One of the negative impacts of shrimp farms is that mangroves are being destroyed where the farms are built.

Mangroves however are very important for people living close to the coast. The reason for this is that mangroves offer products that can be used for cooking, building houses and fodder, as well as fish, and other food items. They also offer protection against floods and pollutants. Moreover, mangroves are important for other ecosystems and host animals like fish, crab and shrimp.

In 2015, the government of Sri Lanka reached an agreement with private companies, non-governmental organizations, researchers and members of affected communities. This agreement protects all mangrove forests in Sri Lanka by law. Moreover, they agreed to launch mangrove reforestation activities and to create alternative sources of income for locals.

=== Coral reef destruction ===
Coral reefs are threatened by human activities such as destructive fishing methods, coral-mining, pollution and unsustainable management practices. Extensive aquaculture is the biggest threat to coral reefs. Shrimp farms are especially destructive to coral reefs.

Coral reefs are very important for the coastal population. They provide food, protect the coast, and are popular destination for tourists and therefore are important for people's income. Most Sri Lankans live along the coast and the population is growing which will have greater negative consequences for the coral reefs.

=== Soil degradation ===
Parts of the dry zone as well as the wet zone are damaged by soil degradation. Soil erosion in Sri Lanka is 14 to 33 times bigger than it would be without human influence. It has negative impacts on agriculture as well as on people's livelihood.

Soil degradation is mainly caused by unsustainable agricultural practices, high intensity rainfall and indirectly caused by population growth which results in increased consumption. Tree plantation such as tea and rubber plantation cause low rates of soil erosion. Higher rates of soil erosion are caused by crops which are harvested annually like potatoes, most vegetables and tobacco. Soil degradation in the dry zone leads to desertification. The loss of soil also is a big problem near watersheds, because a lot of hydro power plants are built in those watersheds.

=== Air pollution ===
Air pollution is a problem in Sri Lanka's cities and it is mostly caused by vehicles. The number of motor vehicles almost tripled during the 1990s which also led to an increase in traffic jams. The use of old vehicles and poor quality gas intensify negative consequences.

Major air pollutants in Sri Lanka are oxides of carbon, oxides of nitrogen, oxides of sulfur, particulates, inorganic compounds, hydrocarbons and the secondary pollutant photochemical smog. These pollutants have negative impact on people's health as they can cause respiratory illnesses, asthma or even death. Dust falls are also an issue in areas with a high traffic density.

Besides outdoor pollution, indoor pollution also is a concern. The pollutants listed above have even worse impacts inside motor vehicles and buildings. Air pollution inside buildings is a severe problem when firewood is used for cooking. In 2000, 80% of households burned firewood for cooking which sets free many fine particles that can cause respiratory illnesses, and cancer.

=== Water pollution ===
Domestic activities, industry and agriculture cause water pollution in Sri Lanka.

Rivers and lakes are most affected by pollutants. Pollutants that end up in lakes are sewage, vegetable waste and waste from hospitals. The pollution of lakes in Sri Lanka leads to algal blooms, which reduces the oxygen content and has negative consequences on fish populations. The Kelani river is especially polluted because it flows through industrial areas. Industrial waste is often discharged into the river, treated or untreated. Moreover, dumps that are located close to rivers have negative influences on the water quality. Large amounts of pesticides used in the agricultural sector also get into the water of rivers and lakes. Groundwater and surface water are also polluted by the heavy use of fertilizer and pesticides and by storm run-offs. Coastal and marine waters are threatened by pesticides, fertilizer, industrial waste and run-offs from waste dumps. Rivers that flow out into the sea deteriorate the sea water. Oil spills, chemicals and non-biodegradable waste such as plastic also decrease the quality of Sri Lanka's seawater. Microplastic pollution has resulted in a drastic reduction of fish stocks.

In 2000, only 25% of the households in Sri Lanka got their water through pipes. Even the water that does come through the pipe from local suppliers is not monitored efficiently. This is why a part of the population does not get clean drinking water. Sri Lanka's wastewater management requires a lot of work. Only approximately 2.5 percent of the population, primarily in the Colombo region, has access to sewers.

The French Development Agency (AFD) authorized a €75 million loan to improve sanitation services in Ratmalana and Moratuwa, two overpopulated and rapidly increasing suburbs. This initiative will provide better sanitation services to 44, 500 individuals.

=== Waste management ===
Sri Lanka faces managerial problems in waste collection and waste disposal.

A study from 2005 revealed that only 24% of the household had waste management and the percentage of access to waste collection is even smaller in rural areas (2%). Increased waste generation is caused by high population growth, industrialization, urbanization and increased consumption.

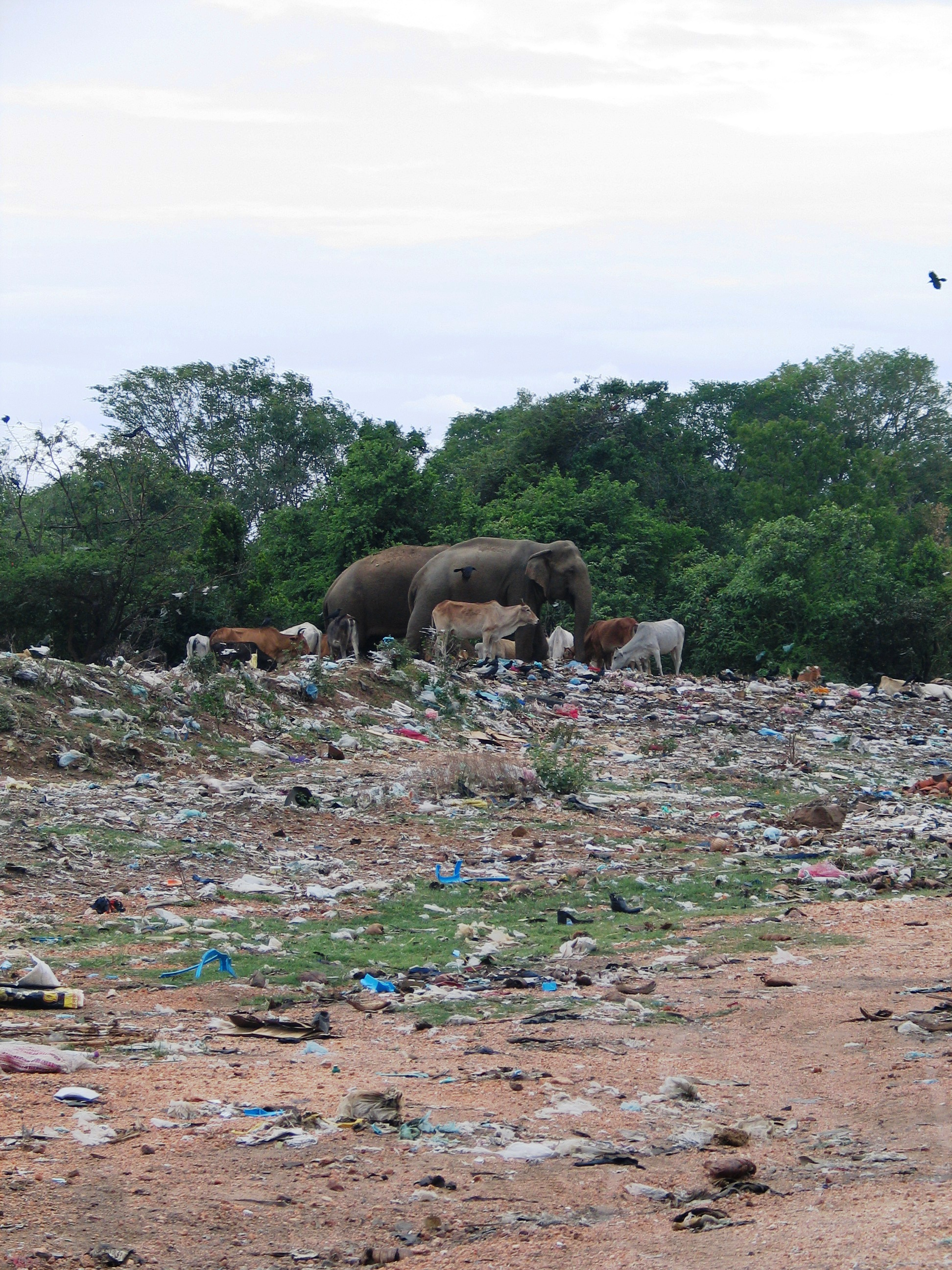
Uncollected waste in Sri Lanka

Provinces and local authorities are over-strained by these large amounts. Collected waste is often brought to open dumps and is not treated. Moreover, some dumps are located in environmentally sensitive locations or close to residential areas. These problems are caused by a lack of governmental regulations and public commitment but also a lack of technical knowledge, low financial resources and too little suitable space for waste disposal sites. The effects of poor waste management is waste laying in the streets, waterways and swamps. These results influence the aesthetic of the landscape, decrease the biodiversity, cause health problems and have negative impacts on Sri Lanka's tourist industry. The study shows that in areas without waste collection, the majority of people dump their waste that should be going to the landfill in their backyard. Plastics and paper are often burned or also disposed in the backyard. Moreover, green waste is burned by 80% of the household in the southern provinces that do not have access to waste collection.

Sri Lanka's government aims to address these problems by implementing waste sorting systems in households, improved waste collection by municipalities and cities, composting systems and systematic treatment of hazardous waste from the industry and clinics.

=== Overfishing ===
Sri Lanka is experiencing declines in fish populations due to overfishing.

=== Climate change vulnerability ===
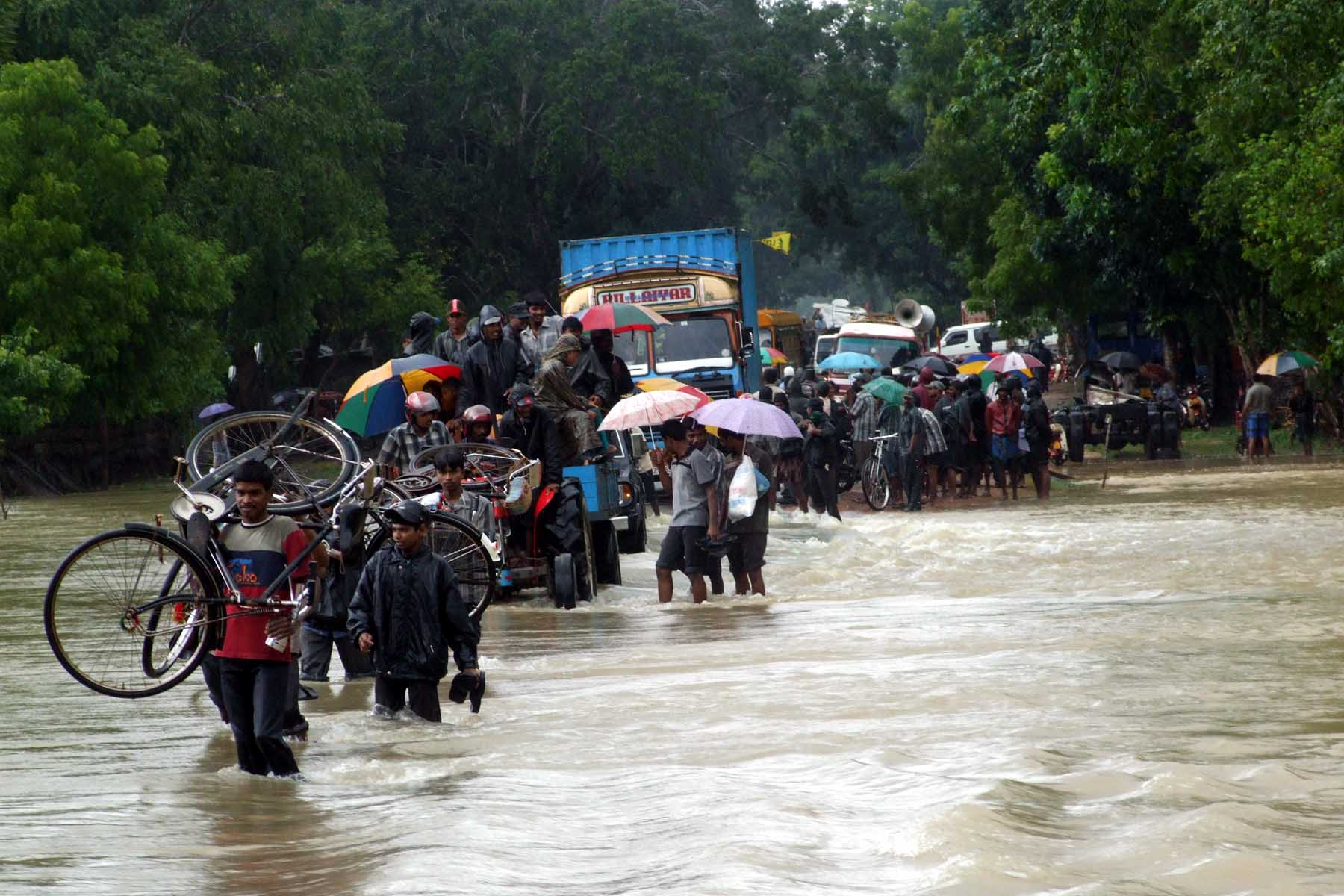
Flood in Sri Lanka

Sri Lanka's geographic location makes it vulnerable for climate change impacts. Expected impacts are an increase in temperature, more frequent extreme weather events like floods and cyclones as well as sea level rise. Sea level rise is especially critical for Sri Lanka's coastal regions. These impacts negatively influence agriculture, fisheries, tourism, people's livelihood, and the environment. The impacts on agriculture and fisheries will in turn influence food security and exports of crops and fishes. Negative consequences for the environment include biodiversity loss, ecosystem degradation and water cycle disturbances.

Sri Lanka has set goals in their Intended Nationally Determined Contributions (INDC) how to implement climate change mitigation and adaptation strategies in order to prevent severe climate change impacts. The government has already implemented regulations and guidelines like the National Climate Change Policy of Sri Lanka, the Climate Change Vulnerability Profiles and the Technology Action Plans for Climate Change Adaption and Mitigation in 2014. Moreover, steps have been taking to reduce possible impacts of climate change in Sri Lanka. These steps include but are not limited to building a more resilient infrastructure, actions to ensure human health and food security during and after climate change impacts like floods and cyclones, and the protection of the environment and the tourism sector.

=== Plastic Pollution ===
Plastic pollution is a significant environmental issue in Sri Lanka. The country's beautiful beaches, rivers, and urban landscapes often suffer from the accumulation of plastic waste due to insufficient waste management infrastructure and a prevalent use of single-use plastics. The Sri Lankan government has implemented measures such as bans on specific single-use plastic products to address this problem. Despite these efforts, the impact on the country's marine life and natural ecosystems is substantial, with plastic debris affecting biodiversity and ecosystem health. Additionally, microplastic pollution is reported in all environmental compartments, land, fresh water, marine and coastal environments. Furthermore, the presence of microplastics in seafood has also been reported in Sri Lanka.

== Environmental disasters ==
=== X-Press Pearl ===
X-Press Pearl was a Singapore-registered Super Eco 2700–class container ship. The vessel entered service in February 2021 and was around 186 metres (610 ft) long. It was operated by X-Press Feeders.

On 20 May 2021, X-Press Pearl caught fire off the coast of Colombo, Sri Lanka. The vessel was engulfed in flames by 27 May and declared a total loss. It was still afloat, and the fire was thought to be under control by Sri Lankan firefighters by the late hours of 27 May 2021. After burning for 12 days, the vessel sank on 2 June as it was being towed to deeper waters. The incident was deemed the worst marine ecological disaster in Sri Lankan history for the chemical products that spilled.

According to X-Press Feeders, salvage operations to remove the wreck began in November 2021. All work on site is expected to be completed by April 2023. Salvage work was interrupted during the southwest monsoon from late April to November 2022.
