= Habeeb Rifan =

Sri Lankan politician

Hon. Habeeb Rifan MP
- හබීබ් රිෆාන් ஹபீப் ரிஃபான்

Member of Parliament for National List
- Incumbent
- Assumed office 24 September 2026
- Preceded by: Abdul Wazeeth

Personal details
- Born: Habeebu Lebbe Mohammed Rifan
- Party: Sri Lanka Muslim Congress
- Occupation: Attorney at law

Habeebu Lebbe Mohammed Rifan is a Sri Lankan lawyer and a politician. He was nominated as a Member of Parliament from the National list on 21 September 2026 by the Sri Lanka Muslim Congress, replacing Abdul Wazeeth who had earlier resigned from his seat on 14 September.

His appointment was confirmed by the Election Commission on 23 September 2026 and was sworn in on 24 September.
