= Utivarachna accentuata =

Scientific classification
- Kingdom: Animalia
- Phylum: Arthropoda
- Subphylum: Chelicerata
- Class: Arachnida
- Order: Araneae
- Infraorder: Araneomorphae
- Family: Trachelidae
- Genus: Utivarachna
- Species: U. accentuata

Binomial name
- Utivarachna accentuata (Simon, 1896)

Species of spider

Utivarachna accentuata, is a species of spider of the genus Utivarachna. It is endemic to Sri Lanka.
