= Nizam Kariapper =

Sri Lankan politician

Hon. Mohamed Nizam Kariapper MP
- මොහොමඩ් නිසාම් කාරියප්පර් மொஹமட் நிஸாம் காரியப்பர்

Member of Parliament for National list
- Incumbent
- Assumed office 17 November 2024

Personal details
- Party: Sri Lanka Muslim Congress; Samagi Jana Balawegaya

Mohamed Nizam Kariapper is a Sri Lankan politician. He was nominated as a Member of Parliament from the National list on 12 December and was sworn in on 17 December 2024.

He is the current General Secretary of Sri Lanka Muslim Congress (SLMC), which contested in alliance with the Samagi Jana Balawegaya (SJB). On 12 December 2024, the Colombo District Court issued an enjoining order preventing the SJB from submitting its national list nominations to the Election Commission without including Kariapper's name.
