= Utivarachna arcuata =

Scientific classification
- Domain: Eukaryota
- Kingdom: Animalia
- Phylum: Arthropoda
- Subphylum: Chelicerata
- Class: Arachnida
- Order: Araneae
- Infraorder: Araneomorphae
- Family: Trachelidae
- Genus: Utivarachna
- Species: U. arcuata

Binomial name
- Utivarachna arcuata Zhao & Peng, 2014

Species of spider

Utivarachna arcuata is a species of spiders in the family Trachelidae found only in Yunnan Province of China. It was described in 2014 by Li Zhao and Xian-Jin Peng. Adult males reach 3.65 millimetres (0.144 in) to 5.1 millimetres (0.20 in) long, while females can be 5.85 millimetres (0.230 in) to 6.65 millimetres (0.262 in) long. It closely resembles the Thailand species Utivarachna rama, but there are several distinct differences. The back part of the palpal bulb is semi-spherical, the tip of the embolus is only about a fifth as long as the basal part, the tibial apophysis is slightly tapered, the copulatory opening is on the back of the epigyne, the back bursae are longer and thinner, and the connecting ducts are spaced farther apart. In Latin, the term "arcuata" means "curved". This name refers to the curved shape of the bottom part of embolus, the small, thin extension on the palpal bulb of the pedipalp.
