= Najith Indika =

Member of Parliament of Sri Lanka

Hon. Dr. Najith Indika MP
- නජිත් ඉන්දික நஜித் இந்திக

Member of Parliament for National List
- Incumbent
- Assumed office 21 November 2024

Personal details
- Born: 1988 (age 37–38)
- Party: National People's Power
- Education: Royal College, Colombo; University of Colombo
- Profession: Medical Doctor

Dr. Najith Indika is a medical professional and legislator dedicated to transforming Sri Lanka's political culture through transparency and public service. A graduate of the Faculty of Medicine, University of Colombo, Dr. Indika spent five years as a Medical Officer in the government sector, gaining a firsthand understanding of the challenges facing the nation's healthcare and public infrastructure.

His journey into public service began with student activism, serving as the President of the Medical Faculty Student Union and later as the Convener of the Inter-University Students' Federation (IUSF). In 2024, following a tenure as Director General of the President's Media Division, he was appointed to Parliament via the National People's People (NPP) National List.

Currently, as Chairman of the Sectoral Oversight Committee on Governance, Justice, and Civil Protection, Dr. Indika is a leading voice for legislative reform. He has been instrumental in spearheading the abolition of parliamentary pensions and amending critical drug laws, consistently advocating for a governance model that prioritizes the citizen over the politician.

== Parliamentary Leadership & Legislative Record ==
=== Current Roles ===
- Chairman: Sectoral Oversight Committee on Governance, Justice, and Civil Protection.
- Appointed Member:
  - Parliamentary Caucus for Youth
  - Sectoral Oversight Committee on Governance, Justice and Civil Protection
  - Committee on Standing Orders
  - Backbencher Committee
  - Ministerial Consultative Committee on Defence
  - Ministerial Consultative Committee on Digital Economy
  - Ministerial Consultative Committee on Foreign Affairs, Foreign Employment and Tourism
  - Ministerial Consultative Committee on Health and Mass Media

=== Legislative Milestones (2025–2026) ===
Dr. Indika has presided over several landmark bills that align with the NPP's core promise of "System Change":

- The Parliamentary Pensions (Repeal) Bill (Feb 2026): Under his chairmanship, the committee unanimously approved the abolition of lifelong pensions for MPs, a move Dr. Indika championed as essential for a new political culture.
- Proceeds of Crime Bill: Guided the approval of this legislation to establish a legal framework for recovering assets acquired through criminal activity, meeting international governance standards.
- Narcotics Control Reforms: Oversaw amendments to the Poisons, Opium, and Dangerous Drugs Act to modernize the legal response to large-scale drug trafficking and maritime smuggling.
- Digital Transformation: Leading oversight on the transition to a digital economy, including the implementation of digital IDs and streamlined government payment systems.

== Professional Background ==
=== Medical career ===
Before entering the legislature, Dr. Indika served for five years as a Medical Officer in the Sri Lankan government hospital system. His frontline experience in healthcare informs his current policy work, particularly in health infrastructure reform and public welfare.

=== Director General, President’s Media Division (PMD) ===
In September 2024, he was appointed by President Anura Kumara Dissanayake to lead the PMD. During his tenure, he modernised the state's communication strategy to ensure greater public access to government decision-making processes.

== Education & Early Activism ==
=== Academic Qualifications ===
- MBBS (Bachelor of Medicine, Bachelor of Surgery): Faculty of Medicine, University of Colombo.
- Secondary Education: Royal College, Colombo; Ranna Maha Vidyalaya, Hambantota.

=== Leadership Roots ===
Dr. Indika has been a vocal advocate for social justice since his student days:

- Convener, Inter-University Students' Federation (IUSF) (2014–2015): Led national campaigns for the protection of free education.
- President, Medical Faculty Student Union (2012–2013): Represented the interests of medical students during critical healthcare policy debates.
