= Abubakar Adambawa =

Sri Lankan politician

Hon. Abubakar Adambawa අබුබකර් අඩම්බාව MP
- Incumbent
- Assumed office 21 November 2024

Personal details
- Party: Janatha Vimukthi Peramuna
- Other political affiliations: National People's Power
- Occupation: teacher

Abubakar Adambawa is a Sri Lankan politician and a member of the National People's Power. He was appointed as a Member of Parliament for National List in 2024 Sri Lankan parliamentary election as a member of the National People's Power. He was contested from Ampara District, but failed to win the votes enough to enter the Parliament. He has a B.Sc. and M.Sc. degree in Biology and worked as the deputy secretary of the Ceylon Teachers Service Association.
