= Super Eco 2700 =

Container ship

Super Eco 2700 is a class of container ship. The ship type has been built in shipyards in China for various shipping companies since around the mid-2010s. The design comes from the Marine Design and Research Institute of China (MARIC).

The ships are powered by a six-cylinder two-stroke MAN SE 6G60ME-C diesel engine with an output of 12,500 kW (16,800 hp). The engine acts on a fixed pitch propeller. The ships are equipped with an electrically-powered bow thruster. Four diesel generators, some of which have different configurations, are available for the on-board power supply. An emergency generator is also installed.

The ships have nine 40-foot (12 m) bays, one behind the other, in the holds. The holds are equipped with cell guides. They are closed with pontoon hatch covers. On deck there are nine 40-foot bays, one behind the other, and another 40-foot bay directly in front of the deckhouse. The engine room is located in the fuselage. There is space for up to 14 containers next to each other on deck; up to seven layers can be loaded here on top of each other. On deck there are lashing bridges with cell guides for the lowest layer between the hatch covers. For the containers standing on deck directly in front of the deckhouse, the cell guides extend two layers high. The container capacity of the ships is around 2,700 TEU. With homogeneous loading with 14 t (14 long tons; 15 short tons) heavy containers, the ships can load around 2,300 containers. There are 600 connections for refrigerated containers, of which 390 on deck and 210 in the holds.

Most ships were built for container handling without a ship's crane. Some of the ships were equipped with three ship cranes arranged amidships. There is a breakwater on the forecastle to protect against overflowing water.

== Incident ==
The Singaporean container ship X-Press Pearl which was built as the fifth ship of the X-Press Feeders based on the Super Eco 2700 design sunk in June 2021, just near the Colombo Port in Sri Lanka after catching fire on 20 May 2021.
