= Abdul Wazeeth =

Sri Lankan politician

Hon. Abdul Wazeeth MP
- අබ්දුල් වසීත් அப்துல் வாஸெத்

Member of Parliament for National List
- In office 8 July 2025 – 14 September 2026
- Preceded by: M. S. Naleem
- Succeeded by: Habeeb Rifan

Personal details
- Born: Mohamed Sheriff Abdul Wazeeth
- Party: Sri Lanka Muslim Congress

Mohamed Sheriff Abdul Wazeeth is a Sri Lankan politician. He was nominated as a Member of Parliament from the National list on 26 June 2025 by the Sri Lanka Muslim Congress, replacing M. S. Naleem who had earlier resigned from his seat on 14 March.

His appointment was confirmed by the Election Commission on 3 July 2025 and was sworn in on 8 July. He resigned from his parliamentary seat on 14 September 2026 and was replaced by Habeeb Rifan on 24 September.

== Career ==
Wazeeth is a former chairman of the Pothuvil Pradeshiya Sabha in the Ampara District.
