= Bernard Rulach =

Sri Lankan cricketer (1947–2025)

Personal information
- Born: 2 October 1947; Colombo, Sri Lanka
- Died: 31 January 2025 (aged 77); Canberra, Australia
- Batting: Left-handed

Domestic team information
- Years: Team
- Colts Cricket Club

Career statistics
Competition	First-class	List A
Matches	1	1
Runs scored	18	7
Batting average	9.00	7.00
100s/50s	0/0	0/0
Top score	12	7
Catches/stumpings	0/–	2/–
- Source: Cricinfo, 1 February 2025

Bernard Rulach (2 October 1947 – 31 January 2025) was a Sri Lankan first-class cricketer. He was known for his fielding and batting exploits during his playing career.

== Early life ==
Rulach attended the St. Mary’s College, Dehiwala for his primary and secondary education.

== Career ==
Rulach toured Australia along with the National School Cricket Association team in 1964. In January 1966, he was appointed the captain of the National School Cricket Association team against a bunch of London Schoolboy cricketers.

He played one first-class match during the 1967/68 - 1967/68 domestic season playing for Colts Cricket Club. He made his List A debut on 6 February 1974 playing for Sri Lanka against India in the second limited over match as part of the unofficial two match limited overs series which was played at Colombo Cricket Club Ground. Despite his talent and prowess in scoring a bulk of runs in an aggressive manner at school level, he was not able to secure the privilege of being a mainstay in the domestic circuit, considering the fact that he had hailed from a low-profile schooling background after being educated at a lesser-known school, St. Mary’s College, Dehiwala. He also thus missed an opportunity to play for Sri Lanka at the international level (the only exceptional case, he managed to play for Sri Lanka was in an unofficial List A match against India) due to failing to meet the criteria of studying at a more established school, as it was considered a benchmark for budding cricketers to be in the frame for selections to break into the Sri Lanka national cricket team.

In September 2018, he was one of the 49 former Sri Lankan cricketers felicitated by Sri Lanka Cricket, to honour them for their services before Sri Lanka became a full member of the International Cricket Council (ICC).

== Death ==
Rulach died in Melbourne, Australia on 31 January 2025, at the age of 77.

Sri Lanka Cricket posted a condolence message on their X account and instructed members of the Sri Lanka men's national cricket team to wear black armbands prior to the start of fourth day's play as part of the first test match of the series against Australia. Colts Cricket Club team players also wore black armbands as a mark of respect for him during their Major League Tournament match against Ragama Cricket Club on 2 February 2025.
