= Lalith Dehideniya =

Sri Lankan judge

Lakshman Tikiri Bandara Dehideniya is a Sri Lankan judge. He is a puisne justice of the Supreme Court of Sri Lanka and former President of the Court of Appeal of Sri Lanka.

Justice L. T. B. Dehideniya currently serves as the Chairperson of the Human Rights Commission of Sri Lanka.
