= Ramanathan Archchuna =

Member of Parliament of Sri Lanka

Hon. Dr. Ramanathan Archchuna MP
- ராமநாதன் அர்ச்சுனா රාමනාදන් අර්චුනා

Member of Parliament for Jaffna Electoral District
- Incumbent
- Assumed office 21 November 2024
- Majority: 20,487 preferential votes

Personal details
- Born: 28 June 1986 (age 40)
- Party: Independent
- Education: University of Jaffna
- Profession: Physician

Ramanathan Archchuna is a Sri Lankan Tamil politician and physician. He was elected to the 17th Parliament of Sri Lanka from the Jaffna Electoral District as an independent candidate.

== Career ==
Archchuna served as the acting medical superintendent of the Chavakachcheri Base Hospital and was later promoted to the position on a permanent contract basis. In July 2024, he made headlines for exposing the irregularities and malpractices that occurred at the hospital on social media. He eventually rose to prominence and was hailed as a stalwart by the public in northern Sri Lanka for facilitating a much needed system change to hospitals across the country, and streamline smooth operational workflow.

In November 2024, he contested in the 2024 Sri Lankan parliamentary election as an independent candidate from the Jaffna District and was subsequently elected as a member of parliament from Jaffna.

In 2025 he criticised the government for its LGBT policy stating "You can call me an idiot, but at least I am not gay". He also stated that homosexuality is a mental illness that he can cure.

== Legal issues ==
In 2021, Archchuna was involved in a road accident on the Baseline Road and allegedly assaulted another motorist, seriously injuring him. In November 2024 a warrant was issued against him after failing to appear in court.

During the first session of the then-newly elected parliament on November 2024, Archchuna sat in the seat traditionally reserved for the leader of the opposition. When asked by fellow MP's and parliamentary staff to move, he refused. His actions forced the actual leader of the opposition Sajith Premadasa to sit in the corner of the same row.

In December 2024, he visited the Jaffna Teaching Hospital unannounced and attempted to meet the Director while also demanding to be addressed as "Sir." When the Director of the Hospital Dr Sathyamoorthy declined and insisted on referring to him as "Honorable Member of Parliament" Archchuna threatened to remove him from his position. The Jaffna Magistrate's Court restricted him from entering the hospital unless he is a patient.

In May 2025, Archchuna, after multiple warnings, was ordered by the presiding member of the Parliament to be removed from the Chamber due to him repeatedly disrupting the proceedings.

On 29 September 2025, Archchuna was arrested by the Sri Lanka Police in connection with an investigation into charges of obstructing police duty. He was subsequently granted bail by the Colombo Fort magistrate.
