= Asoka Ranwala =

22nd Speaker of the Parliament of Sri Lanka (2024)

Hon. Asoka Ranwala MP
- අසෝක රන්වල அசோக ரன்வல

22nd Speaker of the Parliament
- In office 21 November 2024 – 13 December 2024
- Deputy: Rizvie Salih
- Preceded by: Mahinda Yapa Abeywardena
- Succeeded by: Jagath Wickremerathna

Member of Parliament for Gampaha district
- Incumbent
- Assumed office 21 November 2024
- Majority: 109,332 preferential votes

Personal details
- Born: 19 June 1960 (age 65)
- Party: Janatha Vimukthi Peramuna
- Other political affiliations: National People's Power
- Occupation: Trade unionist
- Profession: Politician

Ranwala Arachchige Asoka Sapumal Ranwala (born 19 June 1960) is a Sri Lankan trade unionist and politician who served as the 22nd Speaker of the Parliament of Sri Lanka from 21 November to 13 December 2024. He resigned from the position after serving for only 22 days, making him the shortest-serving speaker in Sri Lanka's history.

== Political career ==
Ranwala began his political career as a young member of the Janatha Vimukthi Peramuna (JVP) in the 1980s.

=== Trade union work ===
Ranwala was employed at the Ceylon Petroleum Corporation (CPC), working at the Sapugaskanda Refinery. As a trade unionist in the JVP-affiliated Ceylon Petroleum Common Workers' Union, he was the convener of the Trade Union Collective for Conservation of Fuel Resources, leading protests against the state-owned CPC losing its monopoly to the Indian state-owned Lanka IOC in 2002. He was the President of the Ceylon Petroleum Common Workers' Union until he was sent on compulsory retirement in March 2023 by Minister of Power and Energy Kanchana Wijesekera and the CPC management on the claim that he and a group of trade unionists were obstructing distribution services.

=== Local and provincial government ===
Ranwala was elected as a member of the Biyagama Pradeshiya Sabha, serving from 2000 to 2004. He was then elected to the Western Provincial Council, serving two terms from 2004 to 2009 and from 2014 to 2019. While serving in the Western Provincial Council he was arrested in January 2018 on the charge of allegedly threatening Sapusgaskanda Police Crimes Officer in Charge.

== Controversies ==
=== Educational qualification dispute ===
In December 2024, Mahinda Deshapriya, the former Chairman of the Election Commission of Sri Lanka challenged Ranwala to prove that he had a degree as claimed by the newly elected Speaker. Deshapriya said that the Speaker should resign if he fails to prove his academic credentials and urged the ruling National People's Power to take action if he failed to do so. Ranwala in a public statement dismissed criticism claiming that his advanced qualifications include a postgraduate degree from the University of Moratuwa and a doctoral degree from Waseda University in Japan.

Newswire reported that the official website for the Sri Lankan Parliament had removed the "Dr." title from Ranwala's profile, raising further questions about the authenticity of his claimed doctorate. Independent researcher Dr. Sanjana Hattotuwa confirmed that the edit occurred within 24 hours, based on archived versions of the website. While the title "Dr." continued to appear in Google search results for the Speaker's profile, it was removed from the Parliament webpage itself. When questioned during a media briefing session, Dr. Nalinda Jayatissa, the cabinet spokesperson, addressed the matter. Jayatissa stated that the removal of the title was an administrative decision to align official records with verified credentials. However, he did not provide clarification on the validity of the doctorate itself.

The controversy drew attention from several opposition parties, who have called for greater transparency regarding the academic and honorary titles claimed by elected officials. The main opposition party Samagi Jana Balawegaya initiated a motion of no confidence against Ranwala on the basis that he misled the public and the government by falsely claiming to possess a doctorate. Amidst the controversy surrounding his educational qualifications, Ranwala tendered his resignation as the speaker of the Parliament on 13 December 2024, only 22 days into his term.

On 19 January 2026, Bimal Rathnayake, the Minister of Transport, Highways and Urban Development and the Leader of the House, stated on a political talk show broadcast on TV Derana that he doubted whether Ranawala actually possessed a certificate to substantiate his claimed doctorate, as Ranawala had failed to produce one to date in spite of his repeated claims.

=== Charges of dangerous driving ===
On 12 December 2025, Ranwala was arrested by the police on charges of dangerous driving and failing to prevent an accident. The arrest relates to a vehicular collision that occurred on 11 December near Sapugaskanda in the Gampaha District, injuring him and three other individuals, including an infant. He was subsequently granted bail by the court on the same date.

== Electoral history ==
Electoral history of Asoka Ranwala
Election	Constituency	Party	Alliance	Votes	Result	Ref.
2015 parliamentary	Gampaha District	JVP		11,862	Lost	
2020 parliamentary	Gampaha District	JVP	NPP	5,150	Lost	
2024 parliamentary	Gampaha District	JVP	NPP	109,332	Elected	

Political offices
Preceded by Mahinda Yapa Abeywardena	Speaker of the Parliament of Sri Lanka; 2024	Succeeded by Jagath Wickramaratne
