= Indian cricket team in Sri Lanka in 1973–74 =

The Indian national cricket team toured Sri Lanka in January and February 1974 to play two first-class and two limited overs matches against the Sri Lankan national cricket team. There were two further first-class matches against the Sri Lanka Board President's XI. India defeated Sri Lanka at the Sinhalese Sports Club Ground by 6 wickets but the other three first-class games were impacted by the weather and were drawn. As Sri Lanka had not then achieved Test status, the internationals are classified as first-class matches. The Indian team was captained by Ajit Wadekar and Sri Lanka by Anura Tennekoon.
