= Walana =

Wallana
- Location within Pakistan
- Coordinates: 32.53°N 72.37°E
- Country: Pakistan
- Province: Punjab
- Elevation: 511 m (1,677 ft)
- Time zone: UTC+5 (PKT)

Walana (Urdu: ولانہ) is a village in the Tehsil Kalar Kahar District Chakwal Punjab province of Pakistan. It is located at 32°53'0N 72°37'0E with an altitude of 511 metres (1679 feet), Total Population is 2182 according to latest census 2023. It borders with Bhatti Gujar and Pippli in east, Bharpur in south west, Hattar in south and Dharabi village in north west, it has famous places like Walana Dam and Darbar Baba Sheikh Dawood.
