= M. S. Naleem =

Sri Lankan politician

Hon. Mohamed Sali Naleem MP
- මොහොමඩ් සාලි නලීම් மொஹமட் சாலி நளீம்

Member of Parliament for National List
- In office 3 December 2024 – 14 March 2025
- Succeeded by: Abdul Wazeeth

Personal details
- Party: Sri Lanka Muslim Congress

Mohamed Sali Naleem is a Sri Lankan politician. He was appointed as a Member of Parliament for the National List in the 2024 Sri Lankan parliamentary election as a member of the Sri Lanka Muslim Congress. Previously, he served as Chairman of the Eravur Urban Council.

Naleem resigned from his parliamentary seat on 14 March 2025 to contest in the upcoming local authorities election for the Eravur Urban Council.
