= Jaffna International Cricket Stadium =

Proposed cricket stadium in Sri Lanka

Ground information
- Location: Mandaitivu, Jaffna, Sri Lanka
- Country: Sri Lanka
- Capacity: 40,000

Team information
Sri Lanka national cricket team

The Jaffna International Cricket Stadium (Sinhala: යාපනය ජාත්‍යන්තර ක්‍රිකට් ක්‍රීඩාංගනය, Tamil: யாழ்ப்பாணம் சர்வதேச கிரிக்கெட் மைதானம்) is a proposed international cricket venue located in Mandaitivu, Jaffna, Sri Lanka. The foundation stone for its construction was laid on September 1, 2025 by the president Anura Kumara Dissanayake.

The stadium is planned to be Sri Lanka's seventh international cricket venue and the fifth in the country to be equipped with floodlights. It is being developed as a key part of a larger 138-acre "Sports City" project in Jaffna.

The stadium will be built in four phases. In the first phase, the stadium and pavilion will be constructed to a level where matches can be played.

The second phase will include the main grandstand and media centre, the third phase will cover the remaining stands and the final phase will see the installation of floodlighting.

The stadium, which is being built on land provided by the Velanai Pradeshiya Sabha to Sri Lanka Cricket, will have a seating capacity of around 40,000 spectators.

On 23 February 2026, the construction of the stadium has been immediately suspended by the Director General of the Central Environmental Authority citing that Sri Lanka Cricket did not obtaining the required environmental assessment report.
