= Utivarachna =

Scientific classification
- Kingdom: Animalia
- Phylum: Arthropoda
- Subphylum: Chelicerata
- Class: Arachnida
- Order: Araneae
- Infraorder: Araneomorphae
- Family: Trachelidae
- Genus: Utivarachna; Kishida, 1940

Type species
- U. fukasawana Kishida, 1940

Species
- See text.

Genus of spiders

Utivarachna is a genus of Asian araneomorph spiders in the family Trachelidae first described by Kyukichi Kishida in 1940. It was largely ignored until Christa L. Deeleman-Reinhold revised the sac and ground spiders in 2001, transferring some species from Trachelas and adding several new ones. The genus was further expanded in 2014 and 2015.

== Species ==
As of December 2025, the World Spider Catalog accepted the following species:

- Utivarachna accentuata (Simon, 1896) – Sri Lanka
- Utivarachna angsoduo Dhiya’ulhaq & Dupérré, 2024 – Indonesia (Sumatra)
- Utivarachna arcuata Zhao & Peng, 2014 – China
- Utivarachna balonku Dhiya’ulhaq & Dupérré, 2024 – Indonesia (Sumatra)
- Utivarachna boo Dayananda & Benjamin, 2025 – Sri Lanka
- Utivarachna bucculenta Deeleman-Reinhold, 2001 – Thailand
- Utivarachna chamaeleon Deeleman-Reinhold, 2001 – Borneo (Malaysia, Indonesia)
- Utivarachna convolutiva Dankittipakul, Tavano & Singtripop, 2011 – Thailand
- Utivarachna dusun Deeleman-Reinhold, 2001 – Malaysia (Borneo)
- Utivarachna fabaria Zhao & Peng, 2014 – China
- Utivarachna fanjing Li, Zhang & Yu, 2022 – China
- Utivarachna fronto (Simon, 1906) – India
- Utivarachna fukasawana Kishida, 1940 – Borneo (Malaysia, Brunei)
- Utivarachna galyaniae Dankittipakul, Tavano & Singtripop, 2011 – Thailand, Malaysia (Peninsula, Borneo), Singapore, Indonesia (Sumatra, Borneo)
- Utivarachna gongshanensis Zhao & Peng, 2014 – China
- Utivarachna gui (Zhu, Song & Kim, 1998) – China
- Utivarachna haputale Dayananda & Benjamin, 2025 – Sri Lanka
- Utivarachna ichneumon Deeleman-Reinhold, 2001 – Malaysia (Borneo)
- Utivarachna itiokai Yamasaki, 2023 – Malaysia (Borneo)
- Utivarachna kinabaluensis Deeleman-Reinhold, 2001 – Malaysia (Borneo)
- Utivarachna lata Jin, Yin & Zhang, 2015 – China
- Utivarachna linyejiei Chu & Li, 2023 – Vietnam
- Utivarachna loolecondera Dayananda & Benjamin, 2025 – Sri Lanka
- Utivarachna mandaram Dayananda & Benjamin, 2025 – Sri Lanka
- Utivarachna peekaboo Dayananda & Benjamin, 2025 – Sri Lanka
- Utivarachna phyllicola Deeleman-Reinhold, 2001 – Myanmar, Thailand, Malaysia (Borneo), Indonesia (Sumatra)
- Utivarachna rama Chami-Kranon & Likhitrakarn, 2007 – Thailand
- Utivarachna rimba Dhiya’ulhaq & Dupérré, 2024 – Indonesia (Sumatra)
- Utivarachna rubra Deeleman-Reinhold, 2001 – Borneo (Malaysia, Indonesia)
- Utivarachna subfabaria Liu, Xu & Haddad, 2020 – China
- Utivarachna taiwanica (Hayashi & Yoshida, 1993) – Taiwan
- Utivarachna tamdao Chu & Li, 2023 – Vietnam
- Utivarachna tangi Liu, Xu & Haddad, 2020 – China
- Utivarachna trisula Dhiya’ulhaq & Dupérré, 2024 – Indonesia (Sumatra)
- Utivarachna upcotensis Dayananda & Benjamin, 2025 – Sri Lanka
- Utivarachna yumaoi Lin & Li, 2023 – Vietnam
- Utivarachna zhengguoi Chu & Li, 2023 – China
