= Suicide of Dilshi Amshika =

2025 suicide of a Tamil girl in Sri Lanka

- Dilshi Amshika
- Date: 29 April 2025
- Location: Kotahena, Colombo, Sri Lanka
- Type: Suicide by jumping
- Cause: Child sexual abuse, sexual harassment, harassment, humiliation and psychological distress

On 29 April 2025, Dilshi Amshika, a 15 or 16-year-old Tamil schoolgirl in Kotahena, Colombo committed suicide, following alleged sexual abuse by a teacher at her former school, Ramanathan Hindu Ladies College in Bambalapitiya. Her suicide sparked widespread outrage and protests across Sri Lanka.

The incident brought renewed attention to systemic failures in the education system, law enforcement, and child protection institutions, as well as deep societal issues surrounding the treatment of abuse victims.

== Background ==
Amshika was an accomplished student who reportedly faced prolonged psychological distress following alleged sexual abuse by her mathematics teacher in 2024.

A formal complaint was lodged by her parents on 8 December 2024, leading to the teacher's arrest. However, he was subsequently released on bail with a foreign travel ban imposed. Despite the legal proceedings (case number 34205/03/25), the school allegedly failed to take meaningful disciplinary action, contributing to her trauma.

Amshika was transferred to another school in Kotahena for her safety. Nonetheless, a teacher from her former school allegedly disclosed details of the abuse at a private tuition class, leading to further humiliation and psychological distress.

=== Death ===
On 29 April 2025, Amshika died by suicide, reportedly by jumping from the sixth floor of her apartment building. Her handwritten note identified the accused teacher and described her emotional suffering.

== Investigation ==
The National Child Protection Authority (NCPA), in collaboration with the Police Children and Women Bureau, launched an investigation into Amshika's death. Although initially no complaint was filed by the family, the NCPA has since requested formal statements. The Ministry of Education placed the accused teacher on compulsory leave and sought an explanation from the school principal.

== Reactions ==
Following Amshika's death, massive protests erupted outside her former school in Bambalapitiya. Demonstrators called for the teacher's immediate arrest and criticized the school principal for allegedly protecting the abuser. The incident produced significant public disruption, including traffic chaos. Civil society groups, the Ceylon Teachers' Union, and child rights activists demanded urgent reforms and justice.

Political figures including prime minister Harini Amarasuriya and Minister of Women and Child Affairs Saroja Savithri Paulraj have publicly acknowledged systemic failures following the incident. Amarasuriya emphasized the need for a national mechanism to prevent future tragedies and ensure child safety.

Opposition MP Mano Ganesan raised serious concerns in parliament regarding the government’s failure to thoroughly investigate the suicide of the schoolgirl, who allegedly endured prolonged emotional trauma after sexual abuse at school and further verbal abuse at a tuition center. Ganesan questioned whether delays in government action were influenced by the tuition center’s owner's affiliation with the National People's Power (NPP), the ruling party of Sri Lanka.

== Legacy ==
Amshika's death has become a rallying point for advocates seeking to reform child protection laws, school accountability, and mental health support systems in Sri Lanka. Her story continues to influence public discourse and legislative priorities concerning student safety and justice for victims of abuse.
