= X-Press Pearl =

Container ship which sank in 2021 near Sri Lanka

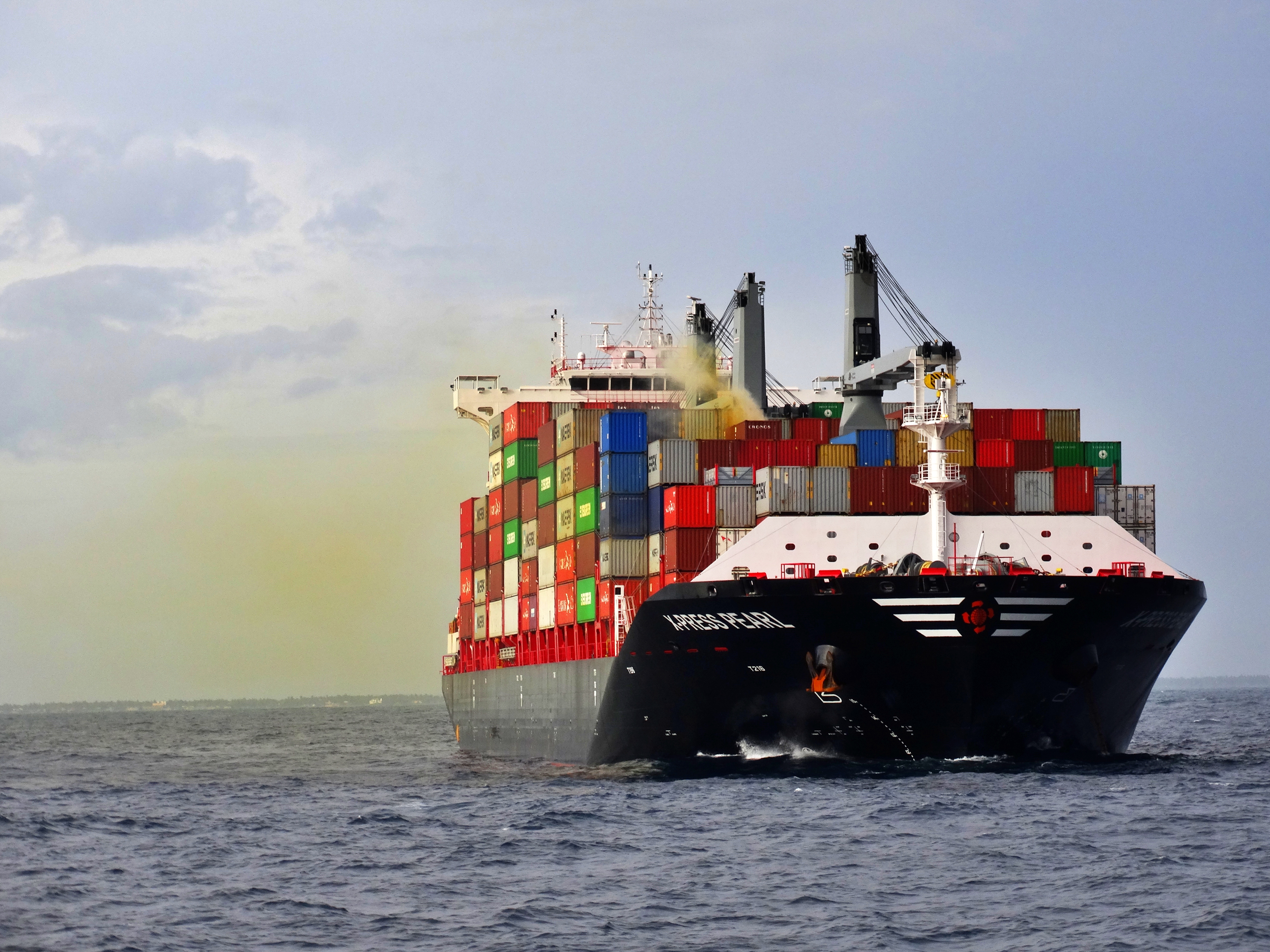
- X-Press Pearl on 20 May 2021, showing fumes from leaking nitric acid

History

Singapore
- Name: X-Press Pearl
- Owner: EOS RO Pte Ltd
- Operator: X-Press Feeders
- Port of registry: Singapore
- Builder: Zhoushan Changhong International Shipyard
- Yard number: CHB084
- Launched: 28 September 2020
- Completed: 10 February 2021
- Out of service: 27 May 2021
- Identification: IMO number: 9875343; MMSI number: 563118200
- Fate: Sank off the coast of Colombo, Sri Lanka after a fire erupted 12 days earlier

General characteristics
- Class & type: Super Eco 2700
- Type: Container ship
- Tonnage: 36,149 DWT; 31,629 GT
- Displacement: 48,848 Tonnes
- Length: 186.0 m (610 ft 3 in)
- Beam: 34.8 m (114 ft 2 in)
- Depth: 17.9 m (58 ft 9 in)
- Capacity: 2,756 TEUs
- Crew: 26

X-Press Pearl was a Singapore-registered Super Eco 2700–class container ship. The vessel entered service in February 2021 and was around 186 metres (610 ft) long. It was operated by X-Press Feeders.

== Timeline ==
10 May 2021 – X-Press Pearl arrived at Jebel Ali Port, United Arab Emirates, where cargo including a container carrying nitric acid was loaded. The vessel departed Jebel Ali for Qatar at approximately 15:00.

11 May 2021 – The vessel arrived at Hamad Port, Qatar. During cargo operations, the crew identified a leak from nitric acid container FSCU 7712264. The master requested that the damaged container be discharged, but the request was refused because specialist facilities and expertise to handle the leaking hazardous cargo were not available.

15 May 2021 – The vessel called at Hazira Port, India, where a further request was made to discharge the leaking nitric acid container. The request was also refused for the same reason: the port did not have the specialist facilities or expertise immediately available to handle the leaking container. The vessel departed Hazira later that day bound for Colombo.

19 May 2021 – X-Press Pearl arrived off Colombo, Sri Lanka, and anchored outside the harbour. Sri Lankan authorities inspected the vessel and cleared it while it remained at anchorage.

20 May 2021 – Within hours of the inspection and clearance, yellow and brown fumes were observed and a fire broke out on board the vessel while it was anchored off Colombo.

20 May – 2 June 2021 – Firefighting and salvage operations continued as responders attempted to control the fire.

2 June 2021 – Salvors attempted to tow the vessel away from the coast into deeper water. The towing operation was abandoned after the vessel's stern hit the seabed, and X-Press Pearl subsequently sank off Colombo.

According to X-Press Feeders, salvage operations to remove the wreck began in November 2021. All work on site is expected to be completed by April 2023. Salvage work was interrupted during the southwest monsoon from late April to November 2022.

According to a 2021 United Nations report, it was the largest recorded plastic spill, releasing about 70–75 billion nurdles that take centuries to degrade.

== Construction and operational history ==
X-Press Pearl was built by Zhoushan Changhong International Shipyard Co. Ltd at Zhoushan, China for Singapore-based X-Press Feeders, along with its sister ship X-Press Mekong. The 37,000-deadweight tonne (DWT) container vessel could carry 2,743 twenty-foot equivalent units. The ship was launched on 28 September 2020 and delivered on 10 February 2021.

The vessel was deployed on the Straits to Middle East (SMX) service of X-Press Feeders, from Port Klang (Malaysia) via Singapore and Jebel Ali (Dubai, UAE) to Hamad Port (Qatar). The return voyage to Malaysia was via Hazira (India) and Colombo (Sri Lanka). The vessel had made three voyages, calling at Colombo on 17 March and 18 April, and caught fire shortly after arriving for its third call at the port on 19 May.

== Fire ==
X-Press Pearl carried 1,486 containers, with contents including 25 tons of nitric acid (which can be used in the manufacture of fertilisers and explosives), other chemicals, cosmetics and low-density polyethylene (LDPE) pellets, when it departed the port of Hazira on 15 May 2021, arriving off Colombo on 19 May. By 11 May the crew had discovered that a container loaded at Jebel Ali was leaking nitric acid, and had requested both Hamad and Hazira ports to allow it to be offloaded, but permission was not granted. According to X-Press Feeders, the requests were denied as "there were no specialist facilities or expertise immediately available to deal with the leaking acid", and the vessel proceeded on its planned journey to Colombo.

The ship reached Colombo on the night of 19 May and was anchored in the outer harbor awaiting a berth. According to the Harbour Master the ship did not initially declare an emergency for the cargo acid leak. On 20 May the ship's agents requested a re-working of the container. Harbour Master Nirmal de Silva said as a maritime hub, Colombo had the expertise to help. The vessel then issued its first report of a fire, which the crew had put out using its on-board system.

=== Requests for urgent berthing ===
The final investigation report by the Singapore Transport Safety Investigation Bureau (TSIB) found that the master of X-Press Pearl made multiple requests for urgent berthing at the Port of Colombo after the leak was discovered onboard. These requests were not approved, and the vessel remained at anchorage while the situation deteriorated. The report concluded that the lack of timely approval for berthing limited firefighting and emergency response options, as operations at anchorage were more constrained than they would have been alongside a berth. The TSIB noted that earlier access to port facilities might have improved firefighting effectiveness and emergency management, potentially mitigating the escalation of the fire.

=== Sri Lanka Navy and Ports Authority inspection ===
According to statements by the Sri Lanka Navy and the Sri Lanka Ports Authority, a joint inspection team boarded X-Press Pearl on 20 May 2021 following reports of a chemical leak. After conducting their assessment, the team concluded that there was no immediate danger and therefore did not recommend emergency berthing or escalation of response measures at that time. Subsequent investigations and reporting indicated that this assessment underestimated the severity of the developing situation, as the fire intensified shortly thereafter, ultimately leading to the vessel’s loss.

It was reported that the ship caught fire on 20 May, 9.5 nautical miles (17.6 km; 10.9 mi) northwest of the Colombo Port. The Sri Lanka Navy, along with the Sri Lanka Ports Authority, which boarded the ship in order to find out the cause of the fire, suspected that the fire might have started as a result of the reaction of chemicals being transported on the ship. During the fire incident, the vessel had a crew of 25 members on board.

Though initial reports linked the incident to leaking acid, Harbor Master De Silva said the fire had broken out in the number 2 hold of X-Press Pearl while the container was stacked on deck. A fuller investigation was needed to determine the cause, he said.

On 25 May, a large explosion took place inside the vessel and all 25 crew members were evacuated. Two Indian crew members who sustained injuries during the explosion were admitted to the Colombo's National Hospital of Sri Lanka.

The fire continued to blaze during 25 May, and by late afternoon containers were dropping off the vessel into the sea. The Sri Lanka Maritime Environmental Protection Authority (MEPA) declared a Tier II oil spill event from on-board bunkers as the blaze got worse. India dispatched firefighting and pollution control Coast Guard vessels, a tug and a Dornier maritime reconnaissance aircraft to help containment measures, and fishermen were asked to stay clear of the ship.

Chairperson of MEPA Dharshani Lahandapura said on 26 May that 378 tonnes of oil were on board the vessel and about half could leak into the sea after the fire ended. Bad weather prevented the deployment of oil-containment booms around the ship, but authorities were ready to clean up any oil that reached the shore. By morning, burnt debris and some fallen cargo were washing up on Sri Lanka's Negombo coast. On 29 May, X-Press Pearl was still smouldering and belching smoke, though flames were down. Hull integrity was still intact. Firefighting tugs continued to pour water on the ship. The Sri Lanka Air Force dropped dry chemical powder. The Indian Coast Guard vessel ICG Samudra Prahari, a pollution control ship, joined the task force. By the morning of 30 May, the fire was mostly out and water was still being sprayed. X-Press Feeders said salvors were looking at boarding the vessel to set up a tow connection. Salvors boarded the vessel on 1 June for the first inspection. Salvors found the engine room flooded and smoke still coming out from cargo hold 1, 2 and 3 intermittently.

== Rescue operations ==
On 21 May 2021, Sri Lankan Navy deployed two offshore patrol vessels, naval ships such as Sagara and Sindurala along with an aircraft in firefighting rescue operations which went in full swing despite inclement weather conditions surrounding the area. It was revealed that the fire had been brought under control on 21 May and the cooling efforts were continued to prevent the fire from flaring up. On 22 May, the Sri Lanka Air Force deployed a Bell 212 helicopter in the rescue operations. Out of the 25 evacuated crew, two were in the hospital. On 25 May, India dispatched ICG Vaibhav, ICG Dornier and Tug Water Lilly to help the Sri Lankan Navy extinguish the fire. India's specialised pollution response vessel Samudra Prahari arrived on 29 May. India had named the rescue efforts Operation Sagar Araksha 2.

On 2 June 2021, X-Press Feeders issued a statement saying the company "regret[s] to report that despite salvors successfully boarding the vessel and attaching a tow wire, efforts to move the ship to deeper waters have failed".

The ship remains in 21 metres (69 ft) deep water. Most of it is submerged, and the site is continuously monitored by a dedicated ship.

== Indian Coast Guard assessment ==
The Indian Coast Guard's After Action Report on Operation Sagar Aaraksha-II identified several operational lessons from the X-Press Pearl incident. It emphasised the importance of coastal states maintaining adequate capability to respond to incidents involving hazardous and noxious substances (HNS), including specialised pollution response vessels, trained personnel, and equipment for chemical incident management.

The report stated that early assessment and prompt specialised response are critical to preventing escalation in such incidents, and highlighted the need for preparedness in handling hazardous cargo fires, including monitoring, containment, and environmental protection measures.

The report did not explicitly criticise Sri Lankan authorities, but it described the incident as demonstrating the importance of regional cooperation, with India deploying multiple assets in support of response efforts at the request of Sri Lankan authorities.

== Environmental damage ==
Sri Lanka's Marine Environmental Protection Authority (MEPA) said it was assessing the environmental damage and collecting evidence. Plans were made to submit an interim claim. Plastic resin pellet pollution from spilled cargo was washing up on Sri Lanka's beaches from 27 May. LDPE pellets have also been washed onto nearby land. According to MEPA, there were three containers of plastic pellets on board the ship, each weighing 26,000 kilograms (57,000 lb).

=== Independent review of MEPA assessment ===
In December 2025, marine ecologist Amelia S. Wenger published an independent technical review titled A Review of the Sri Lankan Marine Environment Protection Authority’s 2nd Interim Report of the Environmental Damage Assessment of the MV X-Press Pearl Maritime Disaster. The review examined the scientific basis of the Marine Environment Protection Authority (MEPA) of Sri Lanka’s Second Interim Report on the environmental impacts of the 2021 MV X-Press Pearl maritime disaster.

Wenger assessed whether the environmental impacts claimed in MEPA’s report were supported by documented evidence, evaluated the transparency and reproducibility of the scientific methods used, and identified data gaps relevant to environmental accountability and compensation claims.

The review concluded that while MEPA’s report described plausible pathways of environmental harm, several asserted impacts were not consistently supported by clearly documented empirical data or baseline comparisons necessary to demonstrate causation. Wenger further noted that methodological details, including sampling design and analytical approaches, were often insufficiently described, limiting independent verification of the findings.

Wenger also identified limitations in the scope and duration of environmental indicators used in the assessment, highlighting restricted attention to long-term ecological processes, chronic toxicity, and ecosystem-level impacts such as microplastic contamination. The review emphasised the need for extended, standardised monitoring to adequately assess long-term environmental consequences of the incident.

The report recommended that future environmental damage assessments adopt transparent and standardised methodologies, clearly distinguish between observed and inferred impacts, and align with internationally recognised best practices to support environmental management and legal processes following maritime pollution events.

=== Pre-Existing Microplastics in Negombo Lagoon biota ===
Subsequen studies of Negombo Lagoon biota reported widespread microplastic contamination in fish, shrimp, and mud crabs, but the particle types reported were largely fibres or filaments, fragments, films, and other non-pellet forms rather than nurdles attributable to the X-Press Pearl spill. A 2024 study of 157 commercial fish from 18 species, sampled between June 2022 and January 2023, found microplastics in 54.14% of gastrointestinal tracts; filaments were the dominant morphology in both gastrointestinal tracts and gills, and identified polymers included rayon, PET/polyester, polypropylene, polyethylene, and polyamide. A study of shrimp from the lagoon, sampled on 12 September 2022, found 415 microplastic items in Penaeus monodon and Penaeus indicus, mostly fibres, and reported that no nurdle particles were identified. A mud crab study of Scylla serrata, sampled between November 2022 and June 2023, found 1157 microplastic items in gills and gastrointestinal tracts, with filaments or fibres as the dominant type and rayon as the most prominent polymer. These studies are consistent with broader lagoon microplastic contamination from common sources such as fishing gear, textiles, packaging, and local waste inputs, but they did not demonstrate that contamination in fish, shrimp, or mud crabs resulted from ingestion of X-Press Pearl nurdles.

NPR's Laurel Wamsley described the incident as an environmental disaster in June 2021.

Health experts and MEPA also warned that there are possibilities for mild acid rains in Sri Lanka due to the emission of nitrogen dioxide. Sri Lanka authorities banned coastal fishing from Kalutara to Negombo, over contamination fears. About 5,600 one-day boats were unable to venture out and the government promised compensation. People were also urged by MEPA not to touch any debris from the container ship which is contaminated with toxic substances.

A police complaint was made to investigate negligence. It was also assembling an expert panel to assess longer-term environmental damage. Dead fish and turtles continued to wash up on Sri Lanka's beaches and were examined to determine if their deaths were caused by the spill. Out of the 1,486 containers, 81 of those were regarded as toxic harmful dangerous containers inclusive of five tons of nitric acid.

In June 2021, it was reported that the container ship had sunk, which would trigger adverse effects on marine species. On 2 June, salvors set up a line towing X-Press Pearl away from the coast when the stern hit bottom, forcing them to abort the operation. Sri Lanka Navy Captain Indika de Silva said it was not clear whether there was any un-burnt bunker oil left on the vessel but authorities were on the watch for an oil spill.

Sri Lanka ordered salvors to remove bunker oil, if any had survived the blaze, and take containment measures. X-Press Feeders said it had hired Oil Spill Response to support the effort. The operators had engaged SMIT Salvage when the crisis first started. By 3 June, the vessel was still partially afloat, with the aft section resting on the bottom 21 metres (69 ft) below.

Chief Executive of X-Press Feeders Shmuel Yoskovitz apologized to the people of Sri Lanka for the incident. "I'd like to express my deep regrets and apologies to the Sri Lankan people for the harm this incident has caused to the livelihood and to the environment of Sri Lanka," he was quoted as saying in an interview with Singapore's Channel News Asia. Authorities in Sri Lanka continued to collect debris and plastic pellets in what was described as the biggest ever nurdle hunt in the country. About 34 containers had been filled with debris from X-Press Pearl including nurdles. Authorities had collected 1,075 tonnes of debris, including sand, which were stored in containers by 8 June.

As of 15 June 2021, about 40 dead turtles were reported to have washed up on the shore. In addition to turtles, many species of fish, whales, and at least six dolphins also washed up with multiple burn markings; aquatic species are also seriously affected by the dispersal of the plastic pellets. However, a 2023 Sri Lankan parliamentary committee report described the link between the reported spike in turtle deaths and the incident as a key unresolved question and noted that further turtle carapace acid/base studies were still pending; a later University of Padova-led study of one stranded spinner dolphin found evidence of by-catch and viral coinfection rather than attributing the death to the vessel.

== Investigations ==
Investigations into the fire were initiated on 30 May. C. D. Wickramaratne, Inspector General of Police, instructed the police to hand over the investigations to Sri Lanka's Criminal Investigation Department, with authorities warning of possible legal action against X-Press Feeders, the vessel's owners. On 31 May, a police spokesman revealed that a ten-member police special team had begun to record statements from the captain and chief engineer of X-Press Pearl. Sri Lanka Police questioned the chief officer of X-Press Pearl over two days on the vessel's container stowage plan. The ship was carrying multiple classes of dangerous goods including sodium hydroxide (caustic soda) in holds as well as at least one container of nitric acid which was leaking on deck. The voyage data recorder (VDR) or black box, was also recovered. On 16 June 2021, the chairman of local shipping agency, Arjuna Hettiarachchi representing X-Press Pearl ship who was identified as the main suspect regarding the incident was granted bail by the Colombo High Court.

On 31 October, OpenFacto, the French Collective for open source research, published an investigation tracking the nitric acid container to Iran where it was allegedly sold by a broker company called ChemiPakhsh Paykan and produced by Esfahan Chemical Industries, a sanctioned affiliate of the Iranian Ministry of Defence.

A report by Singapore’s Transport Safety Investigation Bureau (TSIB) found that the response to the MV X-Press Pearl fire off Colombo in May 2021 was inadequate. The report stated that firefighting assistance and coordination were limited, that requests by the vessel’s master for urgent berthing were not acted upon by Colombo Port Control, and that decisions regarding towing the vessel may have impeded firefighting efforts.

On 24 July 2025, the Supreme Court of Sri Lanka ordered X-Press Feeders and its local agent, Sea Consortium Lanka Pvt. Ltd., to pay US$1 billion in compensation to the Government of Sri Lanka for the environmental and economic damage caused by the fire. On 23 September 2025, X-Press Feeders refused to pay the $1 billion court-ordered compensation claiming the ruling ignores global shipping liability limits of US$25 million.

On 26 January 2026, the Supreme Court of Sri Lanka heard further proceedings in SC FR 168/2021 concerning implementation of the earlier judgment in the X-Press Pearl litigation. The Court recorded that parties had approached the Attorney General with a view to agreeing a settlement regarding the payment of compensation. The Court stated that the Attorney General could engage in any process in compliance with the judgment and consult the necessary parties at an appropriate stage. The proceedings were subsequently terminated.

== Economic impact ==
Local fishermen in Sri Lanka were ordered to stay ashore because of the pollution; it may affect local economies. Denzil Fernando, a regional fishing union chief, stated that the fishing ban will affect 4,300 families. Rob Hawes, head of marine at loss adjuster Crawford & Co. estimated that the cargo loss of the X-Press Pearl could range between $30 million and $50 million in addition to the loss of the vessel.

In September 2026, a commentary published by the Daily FT argued that continuing uncertainty over the compensation proceedings could affect Colombo's position as a transshipment hub. The writer, identified as the immediate past president of the Sri Lanka Shippers’ Council and chair of the Global Shippers’ Forum, stated that the handling and duration of major maritime disputes form part of the risk assessments made by shipowners, insurers, investors and cargo interests, and could increase risk premiums for shipping through Colombo. The commentary called for compensation proportionate to the demonstrated damage and for a transparent and timely resolution of the dispute.

== Aftermath ==
In the context of subsequent maritime incidents, including calls for compensation following the IRIS Dena sinking in 2026, some commentators cautioned against repeating aspects of the government’s approach in the X-Press Pearl case. Criticism focused on weaknesses in the scientific and methodological basis of environmental damage assessments, as well as concerns over legal strategy, including gaps in evidence, lack of transparency, and limited empirical support for certain compensation claims.

Subsequent research following the 2025 MSC Elsa 3 incident highlighted continuing limitations in historical baseline data for assessing plastic pellet pollution along Sri Lanka's western coastline. A 2026 survey of nine beaches reported that the absence of comprehensive pre-spill baseline data made it difficult to distinguish newly deposited nurdles from legacy contamination, and noted that residual pellets from earlier spill events may remain buried in coastal sediments and later be redistributed by wave action, currents and sediment transport.

Sri Lanka's Nationally Determined Contributions 3.0, published by the Ministry of Environment in 2025, states that a historical tidal database and coastal monitoring are already in place, while noting that financial limitations have hindered the planned expansion of monitoring infrastructure. The document calls for the establishment of seven tidal data-recording stations, continued maintenance of coastal databases, and coastal hazard and vulnerability mapping covering the country's entire coastal belt. In July 2026, Sri Lankan climate and disaster-management officials separately warned that the developing El Niño phenomenon could produce significant weather changes, with potential effects on water resources and ecosystems.

At the time of the X-Press Pearl disaster, Sri Lanka already faced significant domestic plastic waste management challenges, with low recycling rates and high levels of unmanaged plastic waste. A 2024 national plastic waste inventory estimated that Sri Lanka generated approximately 249,000 tonnes of plastic waste annually, of which only around 11% was recycled while about 69% remained unmanaged through dumping, open burning and environmental leakage. Following the spill, Sri Lanka adopted measures including the National Plastic Waste Management Action Plan (2021–2030) aimed at reducing plastic leakage and marine pollution; however, plastic leakage into waterways and coastal environments remains a continuing issue, with recent estimates indicating that approximately 6,000 tonnes of plastic continue to leak annually into rivers and the marine environment.

Captain Vitaly Tyutkalo, master of the X-Press Pearl, remains subject to travel restrictions and legal proceedings in Sri Lanka several years after the 2021 incident. Following the sinking, Sri Lankan authorities arrested the captain and initiated criminal proceedings in connection with the X-Press Pearl casualty; those proceedings remain open.

By February 2022, travel restrictions imposed on other crew members had been lifted, while the captain remained the only crew member still prohibited from leaving Sri Lanka.

Reporting in June 2025 indicated that the captain continued to be unable to leave Sri Lanka more than four years after the sinking of the vessel, and the case has been cited in maritime reporting as an example of prolonged post-casualty restrictions affecting ship masters. Maritime organisations including InterManager subsequently raised concerns regarding the continued travel restrictions and broader issues relating to the criminalisation of seafarers following maritime incidents.

== See also ==
- Environmental issues in Sri Lanka
