= Jagath Wickramaratne =

Speaker of the Parliament of Sri Lanka since 2024

Hon. Jagath Wickramaratne ජගත් වික්‍රමරත්න MP

23rd Speaker of the Parliament
- Incumbent
- Assumed office 17 December 2024
- Deputy: Rizvie Salih
- Preceded by: Asoka Ranwala

Member of Parliament for Polonnaruwa District
- Incumbent
- Assumed office 21 November 2024
- Majority: 51,391 preferential votes

Personal details
- Born: Idampitiyegedara Wanigasuriya Mudiyanselage Jagath Wickramarathne; 23 February 1968 (age 58)
- Party: Janatha Vimukthi Peramuna
- Other political affiliations: National People's Power
- Education: Dharmaraja College
- Profession: Doctor

Idampitiyegedara Wanigasuriya Mudiyanselage Jagath Wickramarathne (Sinhala: ජගත් වික්‍රමරත්න; Tamil: ஜகத் விக்கிரமரத்ன; born 23 February 1968), commonly known as Jagath Wickramaratne, is a Sri Lankan politician and member of the National People's Power. He currently serves as 23rd Speaker of the Parliament of Sri Lanka. He was elected to the parliament in the 2024 Sri Lankan parliamentary election representing Polonnaruwa. He is a doctor and medical administrator by profession.

== Early life ==
Wickramaratne received his education at Gal Amuna Maha Vidyalaya, Polonnaruwa and Dharmaraja College, Kandy.

== Electoral history ==
Electoral history of Jagath Wickremeratne
Election	Constituency	Party	Alliance	Votes	Result	Ref.
2024 parliamentary	Polonnaruwa	JVP	NPP	51,391	Elected	

Political offices
Preceded by Asoka Ranwala	Speaker of the Parliament of Sri Lanka; 2024–present	Incumbent
Lines of succession
Preceded by Harini Amarasuriya	Sri Lankan presidential line of succession Second in line	Last
Order of precedence
Preceded by Harini Amarasuriya as Prime Minister	Order of precedence of Sri Lanka as Speaker of the Parliament	Succeeded by Murdu Fernando as Chief Justice
