= X-Press Feeders =

Shipping company

X-Press Feeders/Sea Consortium
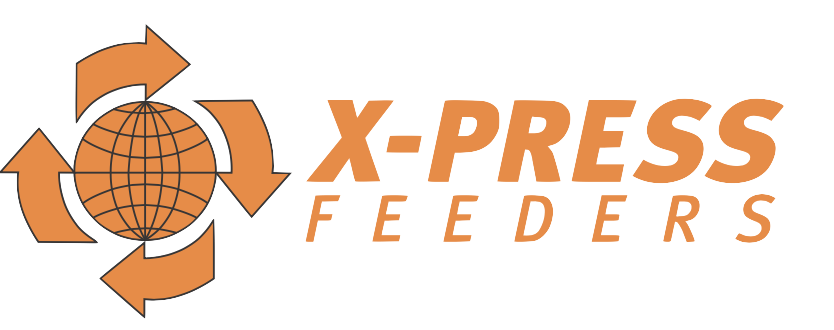

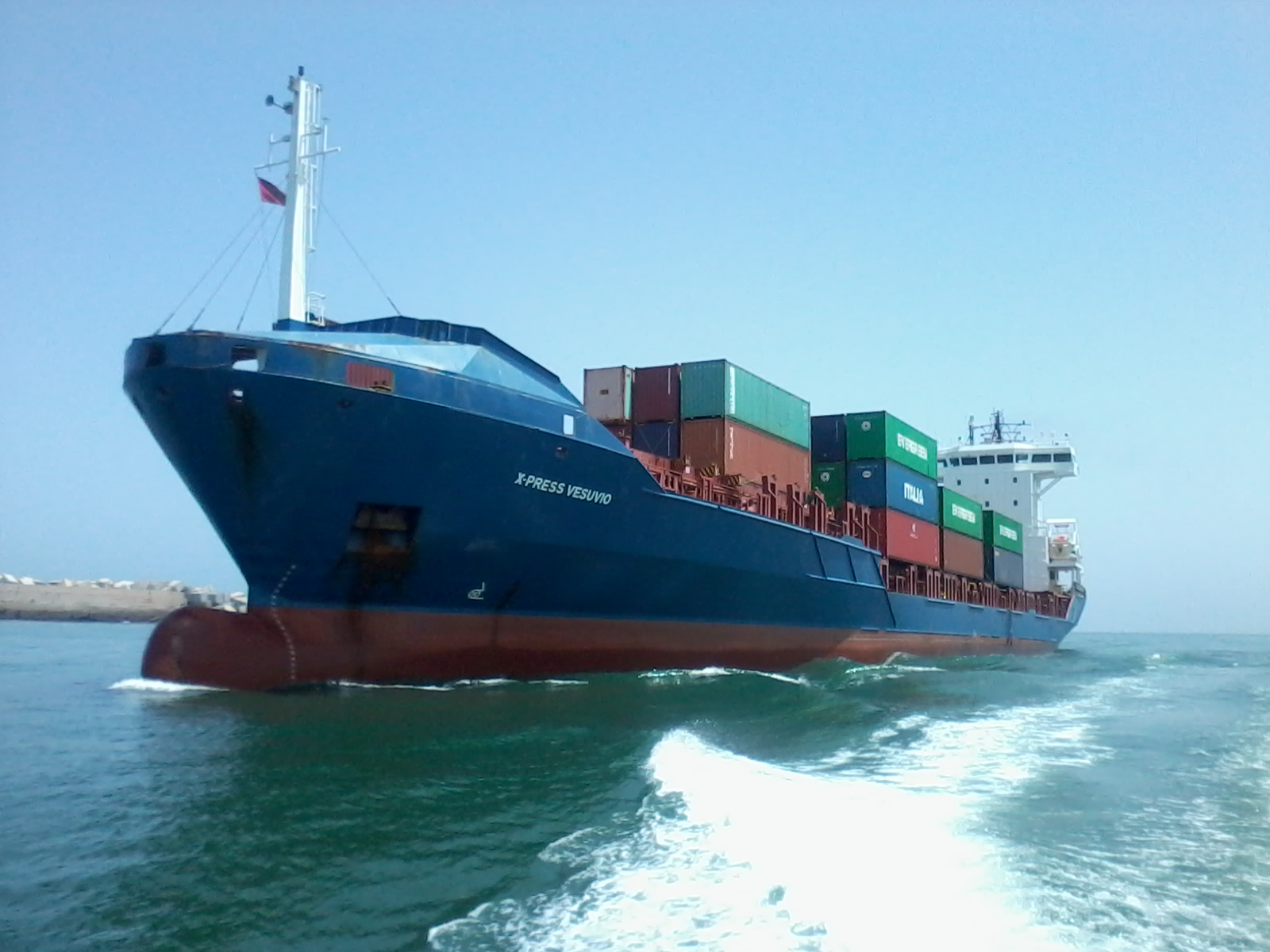
- Type: Privately held company
- Industry: Marine transportation Container shipping
- Founded: 1972; 54 years ago
- Headquarters: Singapore
- Area served: Asia, Africa, Middle East, Europe
- Key people: Tim Hartnoll (Executive Chairman)
- Services: Feeder Services
- Website: www.x-pressfeeders.com

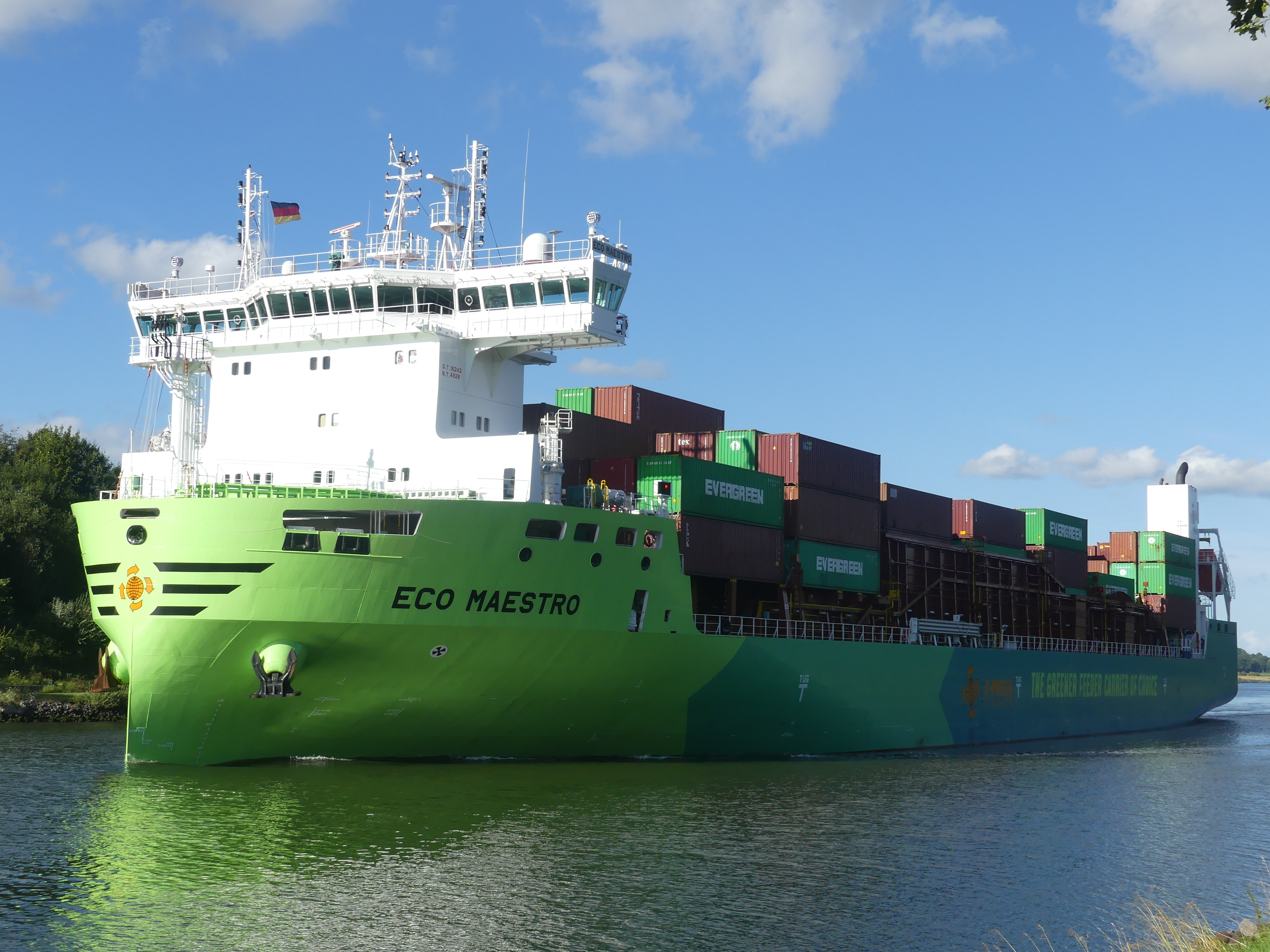
newest class of ships: Eco Maestro in service at the Green Baltic and Green Finland X-Press service

X-Press Feeders/Sea Consortium is a container shipping group operating out of Singapore. It is the 14th largest operator by capacity according to the Top 100 ranking for 2021 published by the maritime portal Alphaliner. It feeds transshipment hubs and ports in East and Southeast Asia, Indian subcontinent, the Persian Gulf, Mediterranean and Europe.

== History ==
Sea Consortium/X-Press Feeders was founded in January 1972. The Singapore-based group is privately held. X-Press Feeders is run as a shipper owned container (SOC) carrier and does not own boxes. It operates a fleet of 110 vessels of which are 43 owned.

Alphaliner, a maritime transport portal in its 2021 Top 100 ranking, has placed X-Press Feeders as the 14th largest container carrier in the world, with a weekly capacity of 134,000 twenty-foot equivalent units (TEU).

In April 2021, the group was reported to have ordered four 7,000 TEU ships from Shanghai Waigaoqiao Shipbuilding of China in an upsizing of the fleet. Its largest ship up to then was around 4,400 TEUs.

Separately the group had placed orders for four 3,700 TEU box ships with China's Zhoushan Changhong International Shipyard in 2018. Two of the vessels, MV X-Press Mekong and MV X-Press Pearl were delivered in 2021.

== Acquisitions ==
X-Press Feeders acquired TransAtlantic AB, a subsidiary of Swedish supply vessel operator Viking Supply Ships in 2015. The transaction involved TransFeeder North Line, TransBothnia Container Line and TransFeeder South Line, with an annual container volume of about 105,000 TEUs.

== Incidents ==
On 20 May 2021, MV X-Press Pearl, a 37,000 DWT container ship with a capacity of 2,700 TEUs, caught fire while anchored off Port of Colombo in Sri Lanka, and later sank. Debris and flotsam led to environmental damage triggering a criminal probe amid fears of an oil spill.

In a ruling delivered on 24 July 2025, the Supreme Court of Sri Lanka ordered X-Press Feeders and its local agent, Sea Consortium Lanka Pvt Ltd, to pay US$1 billion in compensation to the Government of Sri Lanka for the environmental and economic damage caused by the incident involving the vessel X-Press Pearl.

X-Press Feeders disputed the ruling, arguing that it was inconsistent with established principles of international maritime law and failed to adequately account for shortcomings in the Sri Lankan authorities' response to the incident. An independent review by conservation scientist Amelia Wenger subsequently identified methodological shortcomings and questioned the supporting evidence for aspects of the environmental damage estimates prepared by Sri Lanka's Marine Environment Protection Authority (MEPA). X-Press Feeders stated in September 2025 that it had already spent approximately US$170 million on wreck removal, environmental clean-up and compensation to affected fishermen.

== See also ==
- List of oil spills
- List of container shipping companies by ship fleets and containers
