= National list member of the Parliament of Sri Lanka =

Unelected Member of Parliament of Sri Lanka

A national list member of parliament (national list MP) is a nominated member of parliament who is appointed by a political party or an independent group to the Parliament of Sri Lanka. The number of national list MPs allocated to a contesting party or an independent group depends on the proportion of their share of the national vote. A total of 29 national list MPs are appointed alongside 196 elected MPs (elected from 22 multi-member electoral districts) making a total of 225 members in the parliament.

== History ==
Following the establishment of the Senate and the House of Representatives in Ceylon under the Soulbury Commission, the House of Representatives had six members appointed by the Governor-General, on the advice of the Prime Minister to represent important interests which were not represented or inadequately represented in the House, they were usually from the European and Burgher communities and on occasions from the Indian Tamils and Muslim (Moors or Malays) groups. On a few occasions caste groups from within the Sinhalese and Tamils also obtained representation in Parliament as appointed members. In the Senate, 15 members were elected by the lower chamber, the House of Representatives and the other 15 members were appointed by the Governor-General on advice of the Prime Minister and generally consisted of distinguished individuals. The senators were known as "Elected Senators" and "Appointed Senators" respectively. The Senate was abolished in 1971. During the 2022 Sri Lankan political crisis, national list MP Ranil Wickremesinghe was appointed prime minister by President Gotabaya Rajapaksa and weeks later succeeded Rajapaksa as President of Sri Lanka, after Rajapaksa fled the country and resigned.

== Current national list MPs ==
Legend
Governing party
Main opposition
Other opposition

MP	Party
Bimal Rathnayake	National People's Power
Anura Karunathilake	National People's Power
Upali Pannilage	National People's Power
Eranga Weeraratne	National People's Power
Aruna Jayasekara	National People's Power
Harshana Suriyapperuma	National People's Power
Janitha Kodithuwakku	National People's Power
Kumara Jayakody	National People's Power
Ramalingam Chandrasekar	National People's Power
Najith Indika	National People's Power
Sugath Thilakaratne	National People's Power
Lakmali Hemachandra	National People's Power
Sunil Kumara Gamage	National People's Power
Gamini Rathnayake	National People's Power
Ruwan Ranasinghe	National People's Power
Sugath Wasantha de Silva	National People's Power
Abubakar Adambawa	National People's Power
Upali Samarasinghe	National People's Power
Ranjith Madduma Bandara	Samagi Jana Balawegaya
Sujeewa Senasinghe	Samagi Jana Balawegaya
Nizam Kariapper	Samagi Jana Balawegaya
Muhammedu Ismail	Samagi Jana Balawegaya
Mano Ganesan	Samagi Jana Balawegaya
Ravi Karunanayake	New Democratic Front
Faiszer Musthapha	New Democratic Front
Namal Rajapaksa	Sri Lanka Podujana Peramuna
P. Sathiyalingam	Ilankai Tamil Arasu Kachchi
Dilith Jayaweera	Sarvajana Balaya
M. S. Naleem	Sri Lanka Muslim Congress

== See also ==
- Senate of Ceylon
