= 2024 in Sri Lanka =

- Decades: 2000s; 2010s; 2020s
- See also: Other events of 2024; Timeline of Sri Lankan history

The following lists notable events that took place during the year 2024 in Sri Lanka.

== Incumbents ==
=== National ===
President	Prime Minister	Speaker	Chief Justice	Opposition Leader
Anura Kumara Dissanayake (Age 56)	Harini Amarasuriya (Age 54)	Jagath Wickramaratne (Age 56)	Murdu Fernando (Age 64)	Sajith Premadasa (Age 57)
National People's Power (since 23 September)	National People's Power (since 24 September)	National People's Power (since 17 December)	Independent (since 10 October)	Samagi Jana Balawegaya (since 3 January 2020)

Former

President	Prime Minister	Speaker	Chief Justice	Speaker
Ranil Wickremesinghe (Age 75)	Dinesh Gunawardena (Age 75)	Mahinda Yapa Abeywardena (Age 79)	Jayantha Jayasuriya	Asoka Ranwala (Age 64)
United National Party (until 23 September)	Sri Lanka Podujana Peramuna (until 23 September)	Sri Lanka Podujana Peramuna (until 24 September)	Independent (until 10 October)	National People's Power (21 November – 13 December)

=== Provincial ===
Governors

- Central Province – Sarath Abeykoon
- Eastern Province – Jayantha Lal Ratnasekera
- North Central Province – Wasantha Kumara Wimalasiri
- Northern Province – N. Vedanayagam
- North Western Province – Tissa Kumarasiri
- Sabaragamuwa Province – Champa Janaki Rajaratne
- Southern Province – Bandula Harischandra
- Uva Province – Kapila Jayasekera
- Western Province – Hanif Yusuf

== Events ==
- 2019–present Sri Lankan economic crisis
- 2023–2024 mpox epidemic
- 2024 Sri Lanka floods
- Cyclone Fengal
- Operation Yukthiya
- Red Sea crisis
  - Operation Prosperity Guardian

== Events by month ==
=== January ===
- 9 January – Red Sea crisis: The Sri Lanka Navy announces it will join a US-led operation in the Red Sea against attacks by Houthi rebels. President Ranil Wickremesinghe and other government officials defend this decision.
- 13 January – 897 more suspects are arrested under Operation Yukthiya, during a 24-hour window which ended at 12:30 am.
- 18 January – A lorry driver is shot and killed by a plainclothes police officer during a stop-and-search in Narammala.
- 21 January – Jaffna District parliamentarian S. Shritharan is elected as the new leader of the Ilankai Tamil Arasu Kachchi, the main constituent party of the Tamil National Alliance, defeating M. A. Sumanthiran and S. Yogeswaran and succeeding Mavai Senathirajah.
- 22 January – Five people are shot dead near the Beliatta exit of the Southern Expressway, including leader of the Our Power of People's Party Saman Perera.
- 23 January – Sri Lankan Test cricketer Dimuth Karunaratne is included in the ICC Test Team for the Year 2023. Women's cricketer Chamari Athapaththu is included in and appointed as the captain of both the Women's ODI Team and T20I team for the Year 2023.
- 24 January – The controversial Online Safety Bill is passed by the Parliament of Sri Lanka by a 108–62 vote. The bill is widely criticised by human rights groups, journalists and opposition politicians as a means of stifling freedom of speech in Sri Lanka.
- 25 January – Sri Lankan women's cricketer Chamari Athapaththu wins the ICC Women's ODI Cricketer of the Year award at the ICC Awards.
- 28 January – The International Cricket Council lifts the provisional suspension on Sri Lanka imposed last year.

=== February ===
- 2 February – Minister of Environment Keheliya Rambukwella and former Secretary to the Ministry of Health Janaka Chandragupta are arrested by the Criminal Investigation Department in Colombo and produced to Maligawatta courts following their connection to a scandal over the importation of substandard immunoglobulin injections that saw around Rs. 130 million misappropriated. Rambukwella is ordered to be remanded until 15 February.
- 3 February – Following his arrest, Minister of Environment Keheliya Rabukwella resigns from his ministerial post following public pressure.
- 23 February
  - A Russian-owned cafe in Unawatuna schedules a controversial "white only" party to be held on 24 February, where a face control policy would be employed to restrict entry solely to white individuals and attendees. The Russian DJ hosting the party elaborates by saying the party was open only to "white people, no locals." Following public backlash, the event is cancelled. The DJ later says on Instagram that he left Sri Lanka with his family.
  - The Department of Immigration and Emigration issues a notice granting 14 days, starting from 23 February, for Russian and Ukrainian tourists living long-term in Sri Lanka to leave the country. Many of these tourists had been residing in Sri Lanka on periodic extensions of their tourist visas since the Russian invasion of Ukraine in February 2022. The notice is passed without prior approval from the Cabinet of Sri Lanka, thus prompting president Wickremesinghe to order an investigation into the announcement.
- 24 February – Red Sea crisis: The Sri Lanka Navy confirms that one of its ships has completed its maiden patrol in the Bab-el-Mandeb Strait and is set to return to the country. The vessel is later revealed to be SLNS Gajabahu and the Sri Lankan government confirms that patrols would continue.

=== March ===
- 1 March – The first-ever semi-transparent solar photovoltaic (PV) powered agrivoltaic pilot project of Sri Lanka, funded by the Asian Development Bank (ADB), is commissioned in Hanthana, Kandy.
- 5 March – S. C. Muthukumarana of the Sri Lanka Podujana Peramuna (SLPP) is sworn in as a Member of Parliament to fill the seat left vacant after the resignation of MP and actor Uddika Premarathna.
- 6 March – 2024 Ottawa stabbing: A family of Sri Lankan Canadians are fatally stabbed in their residence in Barrhaven, a suburb of Ottawa, Canada. Six are killed, including four children, the mother, and a family friend, while the father is injured. The culprit is 19-year old Febrio De-Zoysa, a Sri Lankan Algonquin College student.
- 14 March – Former cricketer Lahiru Thirimanna is hospitalized with minor injuries following a road accident in Thirappane, Anuradapura.
- 19–21 March – After a three-day debate in the Parliament of Sri Lanka, a no-confidence motion against Speaker of the Parliament Mahinda Yapa Abeywardena is defeated, with 75 votes for and 117 votes against. The motion is filed by the Samagi Jana Balawegaya, the main opposition party, over his approval of the controversial Online Safety Bill. Abeywardena is the fifth speaker in Sri Lanka's history to face a no-confidence motion.
- 27 March
  - The largest maternity hospital in South Asia, the “German-Sri Lanka Friendship New Women’s Hospital” in Karapitiya, Galle is inaugurated.
  - Singer Windy Goonatillake wins the award for the "Sensational Song of 2023" at the 16th Edison Awards in India for her song Ayyo Saami.
- 30 March – Notorious drug trafficker “Location Kudu Malli” is arrested by the Badalgama Police and is caught with 6,120 milligrams of drugs.

=== April ===
- 3 April – Sri Lanka is ranked as the best destination for solo female travelers in 2024, according to the London-based global magazine Time Out.
- 4 April – Actress Damitha Abeyratne and her husband are arresrted and remanded over alleged financial fraud.
- 5 April – The special luxury tourist train titled ‘Dunhinda Odyssey’ is launched, to mark the centenary of the inception of train services on the Colombo–Badulla line.
- 8 April – International cricketer Kamindu Mendis wins the ICC Men’s Player of the Month Award for March 2024.
- 18 April
  - Sri Lanka breaks the record for the highest-ever successful run-chase in women’s ODIs by chasing 302 runs against South Africa.
  - Piyumi Wijesekara is selected among NASA’s new crew for the next simulated Mars journey and goes to the Human Exploration Research Analog, or HERA.
- 21 April – 2024 Fox Hill Supercross race crash: Seven people are killed and 18 others are injured after a racecar plows into spectators at a racing event organised by the Sri Lanka Military Academy in Diyatalawa.
- 22 April – The Sri Ramayan Trails project, an Indo-Sri Lankan cultural and religious bond, is officially launched.
- 23 April – Female cricketer Chamari Athapaththu becomes the top-ranked batter in the ICC Women’s ODI batting rankings.
- 24 April
  - Weerasena Gamage of the Sri Lanka Podujana Peramuna (SLPP) is sworn in as a Member of Parliament to fill the Anuradhapura District parliamentary seat after the death of MP K. H. Nandasena.
  - The Uma Oya Multipurpose Development Project is jointly inaugurated by president Ranil Wickremesinghe and Iranian President Ebrahim Raisi.

=== May ===
- 1 May – 2024 Sri Lankan presidential election: Minister of Justice Wijeyadasa Rajapakshe announces he will run for president.
- 4 May – Sri Lanka wins the Asian Rugby Division 1 Championship by defeating Kazakhstan 45-7 in the final.
- 6 May – The 2023 G.C.E. Ordinary Level examinations commence with 452,979 candidates at 3,527 centers across the island.
- 8 May
  - The Supreme Court of Sri Lanka rules that SJB MP Diana Gamage holds no Sri Lankan citizenship, and is thus disqualified from her parliamentary seat.
  - The Sri Lanka women's cricket team is selected for the 2024 ICC Women's T20 World Cup after winning the 2024 ICC Women's T20 World Cup Qualifier final against Scotland.
- 10 May – Mujibur Rahman is reappointed to parliament as a National List MP, replacing the unseated Diana Gamage. Rahman had previously resigned from his seat in 2023 to run for Mayor of Colombo.
- 17 May – W.A. Chulananda Perera, a Retired Special Grade officer of the Sri Lanka Administrative Service (SLAS) is appointed as the first-ever Sports Ombudsman of Sri Lanka.
- 17 May – Actress Dinara Punchihewa is included in the ninth edition of the Forbes 30 Under 30 Asia list.
- 20 May – The Gujarat Anti-Terrorism Squad (ATS) arrests four Sri Lankan ISIS militants at Ahmedabad Airport, India.
- 21 May–2 June – 2024 Sri Lanka floods: At least 16 people are killed in flooding and mudslides caused by monsoon rains across the country.
- 25 May – Sprinter Yupun Abeykoon wins the gold medal in the Men’s 100m event at the 2024 Anhalt Athletic Championship in Germany with a timing of 10.16 seconds (wind+0.3).
- 30 May – The film Sheysha directed by Isuru Gunathilake wins the award for the Best Dance Film at the 2024 Cannes Film Festival.

=== June ===
- 1 June – Sprinter Aruna Darshana wins the gold medal in the Men’s 400m event at the 2023 Asian Athletics Championships with a timing of 45.82 seconds. Tharushi Karunarathna wins the gold medal in the Women’s 400m event with a timing of 52.48 seconds, and the following day wins the gold medal in the Women’s 800 meters event with a timing of 2.05.74 minutes.
- 3 June – All schools across the island are closed due to adverse weather conditions.
- 4 June – Hemali Kothalawala, Director General of the Department of Animal Production and Health is appointed as Vice President of the World Organisation for Animal Health (WOAH) Regional Commission for Asia and the Pacific.
- 5 June – A 45-year-old man and two women are arrested for brutally assaulting a four-year-old child in a viral social media video.
- 11 June – The Foreign Ministry of Sri Lanka says it has received assurances from Russia that the country would no longer be recruiting Sri Lankan citizens to fight in Ukraine.
- 13 June – International women's cricketer Chamari Athapaththu wins the ICC Women’s Player of the Month for the month May 2024.
- 15 June – Rumesh Tharanga wins the Gold medal in the Javelin Throw event at the Asian Throwing Championships with a new Sri Lanka record of 85.45m.
- 21 June – The Sri Lanka women's cricket team wins the ODI series against West Indies 3-0, for the first time in 16 years.
- 26 June – The Sri Lankan government reaches an agreement with external lenders to restructure $5.8 billion in public debt.
- 28 June – Former MP Hirunika Premachandra is sentenced to three years of rigorous imprisonment by the Colombo High Court after being found guilty of being involved in the abduction of a youth in the Dematagoda area in 2015.
- 29 June – Four fishermen are reported dead aboard a vessel after drinking liquids from bottles found floating off the coast of Tangalle.

=== July ===
- 7 July – Thirteen people are injured after a panicked elephant chases a crowd during a Hindu religious procession at the Kataragama temple.
- 9 July – Shanmugam Kugathasan of the Ilankai Tamil Arasu Kachchi (ITAK) is sworn in as a Member of Parliament to fill the seat left vacant after the death of former TNA leader R. Sampanthan.
- 10 July – Members of the Station Masters’ Union go on strike over administrative and human resource issues, resulting in the cancellation of hundreds of scheduled train journeys nationwide.
- 16 July – Sri Lankan-born award winning celebrity baker Tharshan Selvarajah becomes the first Sri Lankan to carry the Olympic Torch, carrying it out at the 2024 Paris Olympics.
- 20 July – Puttalam District MP Ali Sabri Raheem is arrested by Kalpitiya police due to a controversy with a stock of undeclared gold and mobile phones in 2023.
- 21 July – Asanka Abeygunasekara, former Director General of the Institute of National Security Studies of Sri Lanka (INSSSL) is arrested over a case filed by the Inland Revenue Department and later granted bail.
- 22 July – International women's cricketer Chamari Athapaththu becomes the first centurion in the history of the Women’s Twenty-20 Asia Cup, after smashing an unbeaten 119 runs (69 balls) with 14 boundaries and 7 sixes against Malaysia.
- 28 July – The Sri Lanka women's cricket team becomes the Asia Cup champions for the first time after beating India in the final.
- 29 July – Colombo Port is ranked as the world’s fastest-growing port in the first quarter of 2024 with a 23.6% growth rate according to Alphaliner, a research publication in the shipping industry.

=== August ===
- 1 August – Underworld figure Sujeewa Ruwankumara alias "Loku Patty" is arrested in Belarus, who is the main suspect in the killing of "Club Wasantha" at Athurugiriya. Further, notorious criminal figures and large-scale drug traffickers known as “Kanjipani Imran” and Amila Sepala Ratnayake alias “Rotumbe Amila” are arrested in Russia.
- 7 August
  - Sri Lanka defeats India in an ODI series after 27 years, after winning the third and final ODI by 110 runs.
  - Sprinter Aruna Darshana finishes in 5th place in the 2nd semifinal of the Men’s 400m event at the 2024 Summer Olympics, with a time of 44.75 seconds, a new personal best. However the time is disqualified due to a lane infringement. He previously qualified for the semifinals of the Men’s 400m event after finishing third in the 5th Heat race with a timing of 44.99 seconds, which is his personal best.
- 8 August – International cricketer Praveen Jayawickrama is charged with three counts of breaching the ICC Anti-Corruption Code after allegedly failing to report without delay to the Anti-Corruption Unit, that he was approached to carry out fixing during International matches and in the 2021 Lanka Premier League.
- 9 August – Ministers Manusha Nanayakkara and Harin Fernando are disqualified from their parliamentary seats after the Supreme Court of Sri Lanka rules that they had been expelled from their party, the Samagi Jana Balawegaya, and had subsequently crossed over to a different party, namely the United National Party. Both ministers resign from their ministerial positions as well.
- 16 August – International women cricketer Chamari Athapaththu wins the ICC Women’s Player of the Month for July 2024.
- 15 August
  - 2024 Sri Lankan presidential election: Sri Lanka receives a record number of presidential candidates for the upcoming election with 39 applications accepted, surpassing the previous record of 35 candidates in 2019.
  - Twenty Sri Lankan hostages in cybercrime camps in Myawaddy, Myanmar are rescued.
- 16 August – International cricketer Niroshan Dickwella is suspended indefinitely from all forms of cricket following a doping violation which occurred at the 2024 Lanka Premier League.
- 21 August – Bandula Lal Bandarigoda of the Samagi Jana Balawegaya is sworn in as an MP to fill the vacancy of Manusha Nanayakkara. On the same day, SJB Ratnapura District parliamentarian Thalatha Atukorale resigns from her seat.
- 22 August
  - 2023–2024 mpox epidemic: Sri Lanka reports its first two cases of mpox, but does not specify the clade the cases are from.
  - Governor of the Central Bank of Sri Lanka, Nandalal Weerasinghe, wins an “A” grade in Global Finance’s 2024 Central Banker Report Cards.
- 30 August – Former Sri Lanka Test cricketer Dulip Samaraweera faces investigations by Cricket Australia over allegations of serious misconduct towards a female player.

=== September ===
- 3 September
  - 2024 Summer Paralympics: Dulan Kodithuwakku wins Silver in the Men’s Javelin Throw (F64) event with a personal best distance of 67.03 meters and also broke his own previous World Record (66.49m) in the process in the F44 category.
  - Karu Paranawithana of Samagi Jana Balawegaya sworn in as an MP to fill the vacancy of Thalatha Athukorale.
- 7 September – The first presidential debate for the upcoming election is held at the Bandaranaike Memorial International Conference Hall (BMICH). Though four candidates confirmed their participation, Dilith Jayaweera is the only candidate to attend the debate.
- 11 September – South Asian U20 Athletics Championships: Sri Lankan athletes win a total of nine medals: three gold, three silver and three bronze. In the Men’s 100m final, Merone Wijesinghe wins gold with a timing of 10.41 seconds and Dineth Weeraratne wins silver with a timing of 10.49 seconds. In the Women’s 800m final, Tharushi Abeyshika wins the gold medal and Sansala Himashini wins bronze. Savindu Avishka wins the gold medal in the Men’s 800m final, whereas Shanella Anne Wijetungage wins bronze with a timing of 12.04 seconds in the Women’s 100m final. Meanwhile, Jayavi Ranhidha wins the bronze medal with a distance of 15.62m in Men’s shot put.
- 15 September – The Grade 05 Scholarship Examination commences at 2,849 exam centers nationwide with a total of 323,879 applicants.
- 21 September – 2024 Sri Lankan presidential election: Over 17 million voters elect a new president. NPP candidate Anura Kumara Dissanayake wins a plurality of the vote with 42.31%, followed by Leader of the Opposition Sajith Premadasa with 32.76%. No candidate wins a majority in the first round, forcing a second round of vote counting for the first time in Sri Lanka's history.
- 22 September – 2024 Sri Lankan presidential election: The second round concludes, with NPP candidate Anura Kumara Dissanayake being declared as president-elect of Sri Lanka. Dissanayake receives 55.89% of votes, defeating Sajith Premadasa with 44.11%.
- 23 September
  - Anura Kumara Dissanayake is inaugurated as the 10th President of Sri Lanka.
  - Prime Minister Dinesh Gunawardena resigns.
- 24 September
  - President Dissanayake appoints MP Harini Amarasuriya as Prime Minister of Sri Lanka and swears in a new three-member cabinet. Amarasuriya is the third woman to hold the position.
  - President Dissanayake dissolves the current Parliament of Sri Lanka and calls for snap parliamentary elections in November 2024.
- 26 September – Sri Lanka batsman Kamindu Mendis becomes the first-ever player to score fifty-plus scores in eight consecutive Test matches in history.

=== October ===
- 3 October – Spin bowler Praveen Jayawickrama is banned from competing in cricket for one year by the International Cricket Council for failing to report an approach to fix a match during the Lanka Premier League tournament in 2021.
- 8 October – The Matale High Court issues an arrest warrant against former Sri Lankan cricketer and current Chairman of the Selection Committee at Sri Lanka Cricket Upul Tharanga over failure to appear before the court pertaining to a match-fixing case during the 2024 Legends Cricket Trophy.
- 11 October – The nomination period for the 2024 Sri Lankan parliamentary election ends. Many longstanding politicians opt out of running for reelection, including former presidents Ranil Wickremesinghe, Mahinda Rajapaksa and Maithripala Sirisena.
- 14 October
  - Arjun Aloysius, Director of W.M. Mendis Distilleries, and two others are sentenced to 6 months in prison for defaulting a payment of Rs. 3.5 billion in Value Added Tax (VAT) by Colombo Magistrate’s Court.
  - Cricketer Kamindu Mendis wins the ICC Men’s player of the Month award for a second time.
  - All schools in the Colombo, Gampaha, Kelaniya, Kolonnawa and Kaduwela Education Zones are closed for two days due to adverse weather conditions.
- 15 October – “Cinnamon Life at City of Dreams Sri Lanka”, a 687 room luxury hotel is officially declared open in Colombo by the John Keells Group.
- 17 October – Sri Lanka wins the maiden T20I series victory over the West Indies after winning the third T20I by 9 wickets.
- 18 October – A train carrying fuel collides with a herd of elephants in Minneriya, killing two of the animals, derailing the train and causing a major leakage.
- 20 October – Sri Lankan formula racer Yevan David wins the Euroformula, becoming the first ever Sri Lankan to participate in this category having advanced from F4 racing with a 1m43.444s.
- 23 October – Former Minister Johnston Fernando is arrested by the Criminal Investigation Department over possession of an illegally assembled luxury vehicle.
- 24 October – Three people are arrested on suspicion of involvement in a plot to attack Israeli nationals in the country.
- 31 October – Former State Minister Lohan Ratwatte is arrested over an incident of discovering a car without number plates at his wife’s house in Mirihana, Nugegoda.

=== November ===
- 1 November – A bus carrying university students of General Sir John Kotelawala Defence University on a field trip overturns near Badulla, killing two people and injuring 39 others.
- 3 November – Sri Lanka defeats Pakistan in the final, thus making them the champions of the 2024 Hong Kong Cricket Sixes.
- 14 November – 2024 Sri Lankan parliamentary election: The ruling National People's Power wins in a landslide victory, winning 61.56% of the popular vote and securing 159 seats, the most seats won by a single party in an election. The NPP becomes the first party to win a supermajority in parliament since 1977 and the first non-Tamil party to win the Jaffna district.
- 21 November – The 17th Parliament of Sri Lanka is inaugurated.
- 24 November – The 2024 G.C.E. Advanced Level (A/L) examination commences with a total of 333,185 candidates participating.
- 26 November
  - 2024 North Indian Ocean cyclone season: Cyclone Fengal intensifies into a depression, moving northwestwards towards Tamil Nadu and Sri Lanka.
    - One person is killed and another is injured by a collapsing wall in Bandarawela.
    - A tractor carrying 30 passengers is swept away by floods near Karaitivu, leaving eight people missing.
- 29 November – Cyclone Fengal approaches Sri Lanka, killing 17 people.

=== December ===
- 13 December – Speaker of the Parliament Asoka Ranwala, following controversies surrounding alleged falsifications of his educational records, resigns from his position.
- 20 December – The Sri Lanka Navy rescues more than 100 Rohingya refugees found aboard a fishing trawler off the country's northern coast.

== Deaths ==
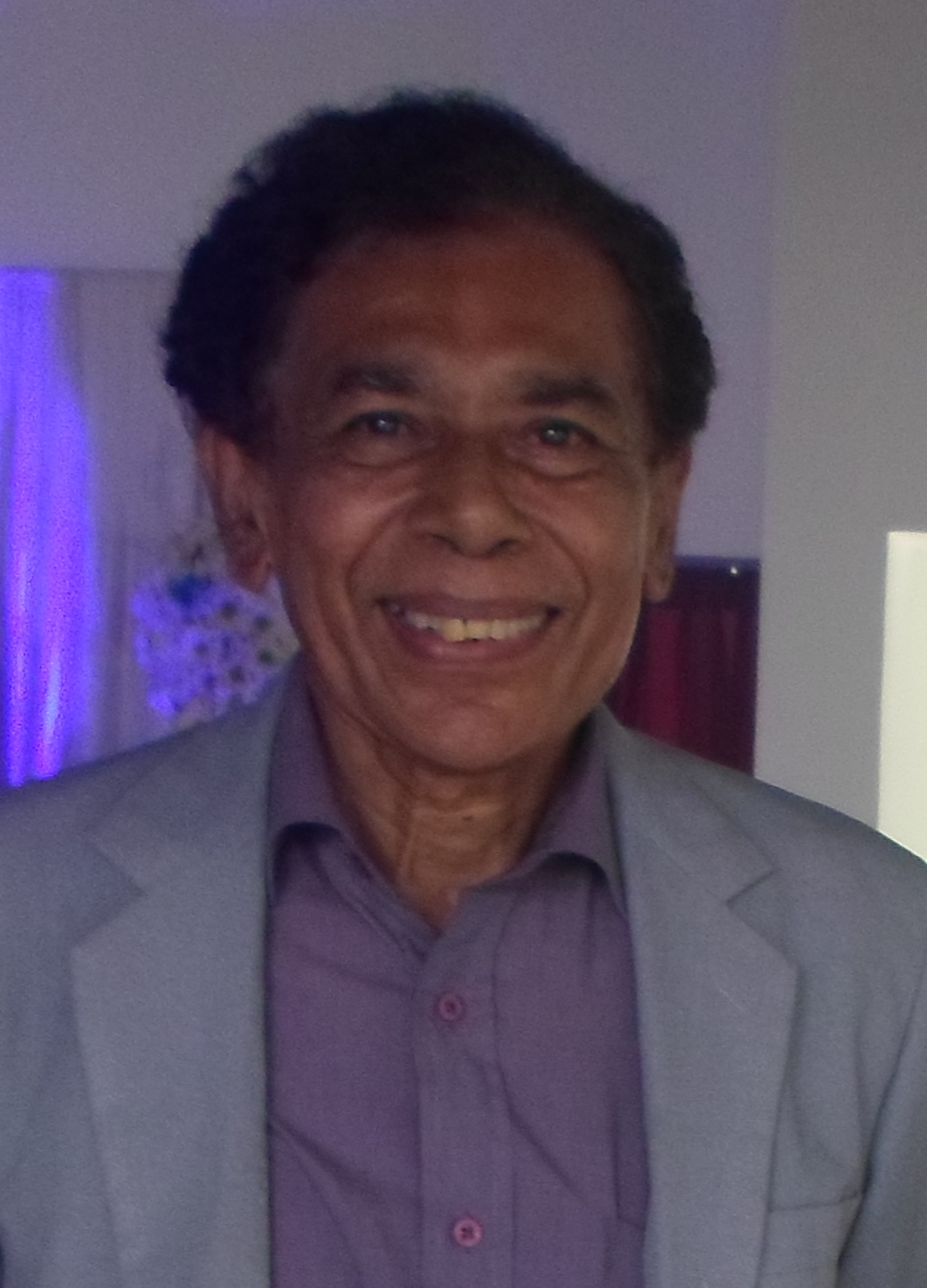
Chandra Kumara Kandanarachchi (b. 1947)

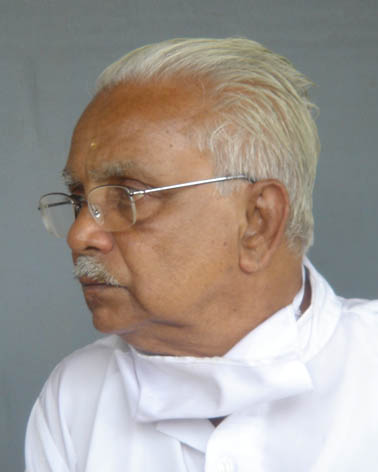
A. T. Ariyaratne (b. 1931)

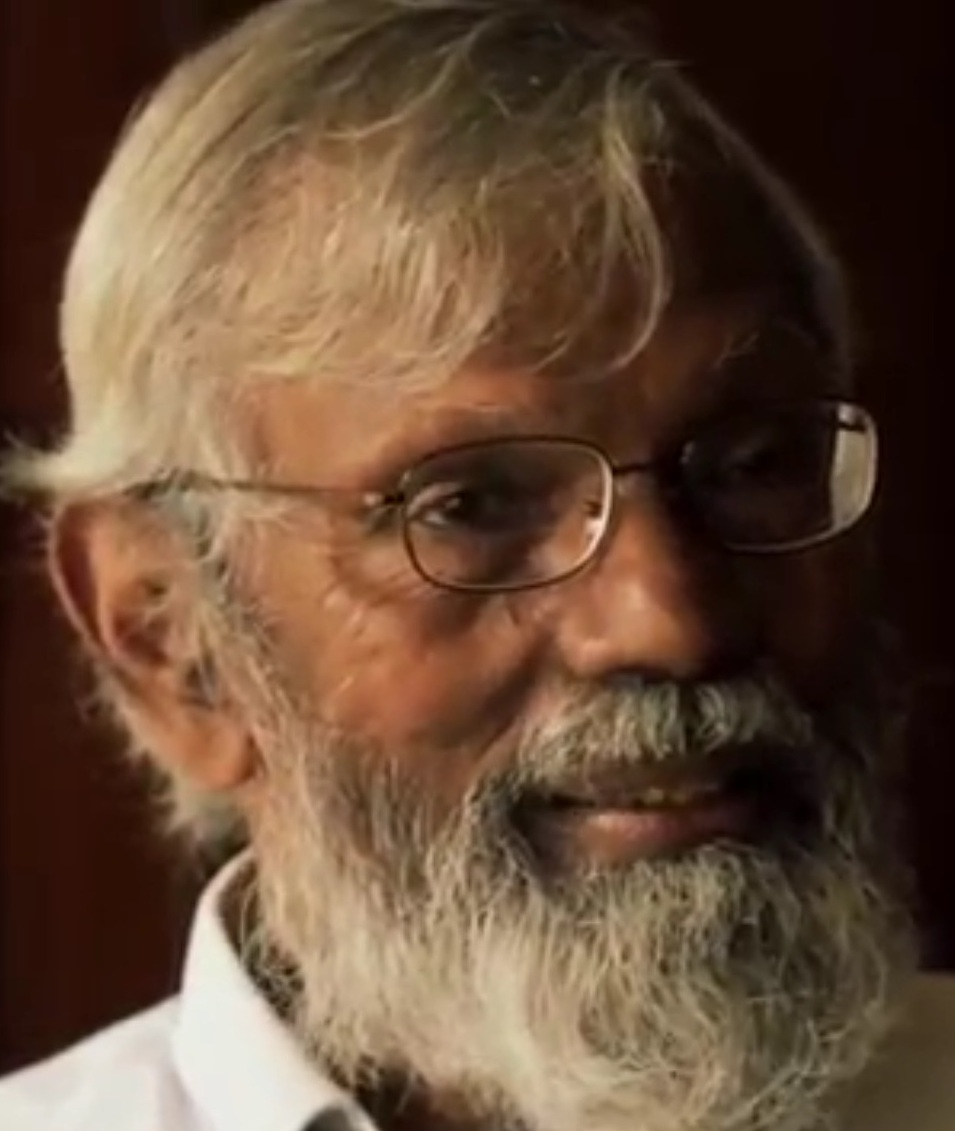
Nagalingam Ethirveerasingam (b. 1934)

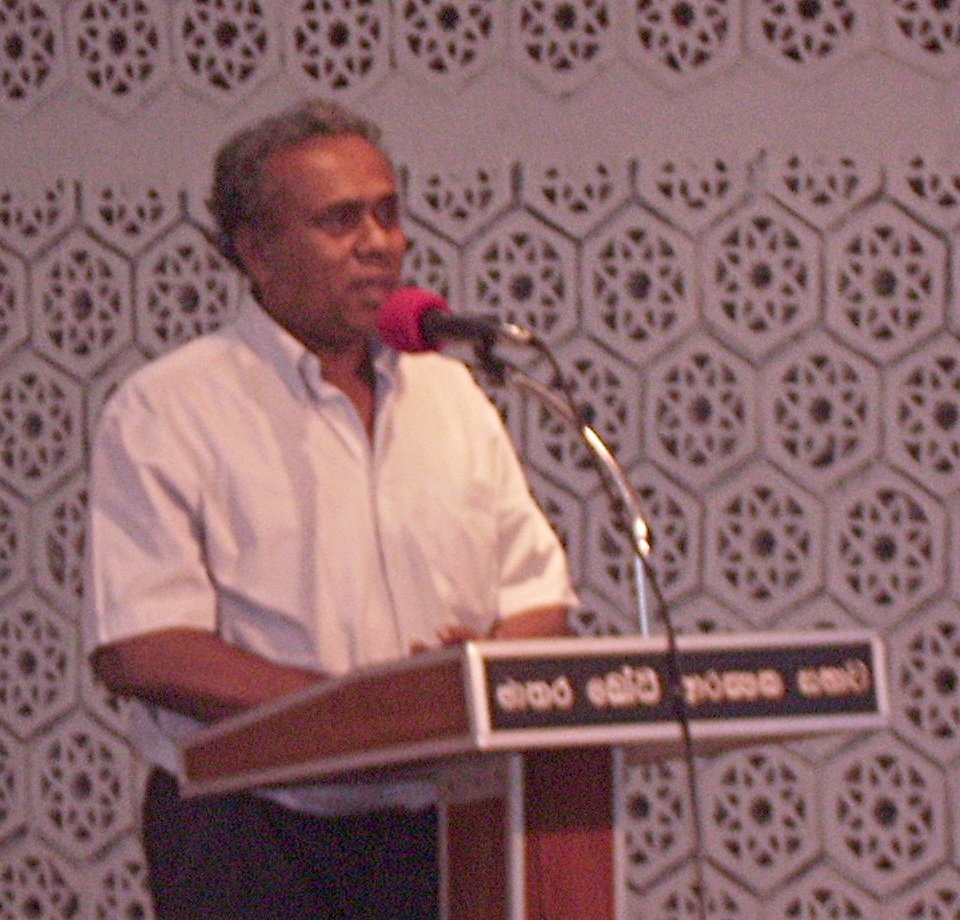
Nalin de Silva (b. 1944)

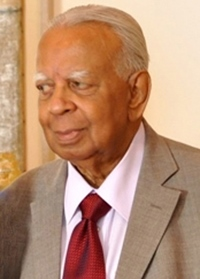
R. Sampanthan (b. 1933)

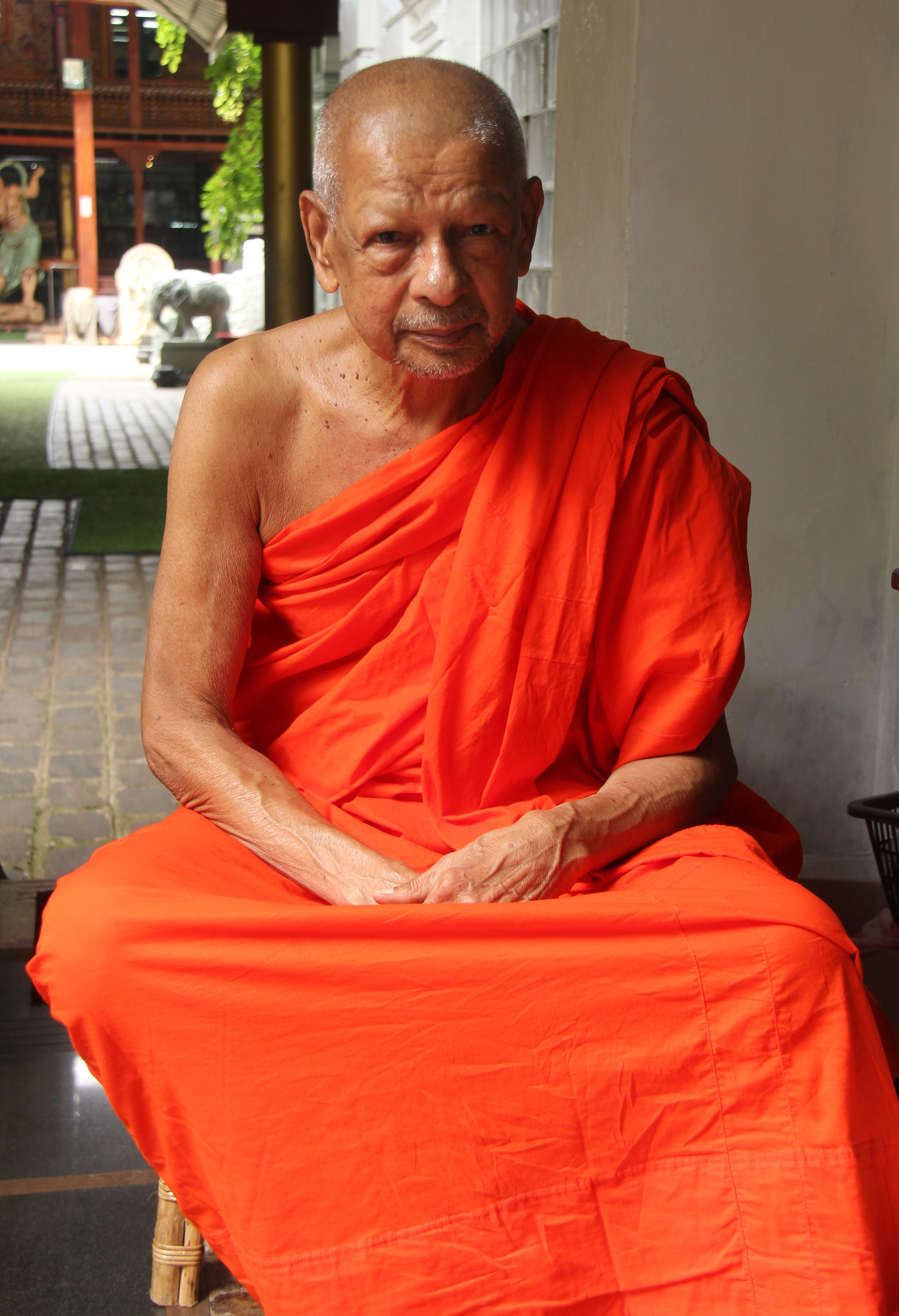
Galboda Gnanissara Thera (b. 1943)

=== January ===
- 23 January – Saman Prasanna Perera, 48, politician, leader of the Our Power of People's Party
- 25 January – Sanath Nishantha, 48, politician, Minister of State for Water Supply (2020–2022, since 2022) and MP (since 2015)

=== February ===
- 7 February – Thalangama Jayasinghe, 88, cartoonist
- 15 February – Yasmine Gooneratne, 88, writer
- 17 February – Gamini Jayawickrama Perera, 83, politician, MP (1977–1989, 1994–2020) and Minister of Buddha Sasana (2017–2019)
- 27 February – Ronnie de Mel, 98, economist and politician, minister of finance (1977–1988) and MP (1970–1989, 1994–2004)

=== March ===
- 8 March – Ramya Wanigasekara, 73, actress, singer, journalist and radio news anchor
- 26 March – Chandra Kumara Kandanarachchi, 76, singer
- 27 March – Russell Hamer, 76–77, national team cricketer

=== April ===
- 2 April – Geethal Perera, 79, actor
- 4 April – K. H. Nandasena, 69, politician, MP (since 2020), and member of North Central Provincial Council (1999–2017)
- 16 April
  - Sri Lankabhimanya A. T. Ariyaratne, 92, activist, founder and president of the Sarvodaya Shramadana Movement
  - Palitha Thewarapperuma, 63, politician, MP (2010–2020)
- 18 April – Nagalingam Ethirveerasingam, 89, track and field athlete
- 22 April – Chandrasiri Bandara, 63, astrologer
- 28 April – M. K. Eelaventhan, 91, politician, MP (2004–2007)
- 29 April – Premadasa Mudunkotuwa, 91, musician

=== May ===
- 1 May – Sarath Fernando, musician
- 2 May – Nalin de Silva, 79, physicist and philosopher
- 10 May – A. D. Ranjith Kumara, 77, journalist
- 13 May – Vincent Marius Joseph Peiris, 82, Roman Catholic prelate, auxiliary bishop of Colombo (2000–2018)
- 26 May – Ananda Perera, 67, musician
- 30 May – Shelton Premaratne, 94, musician

=== June ===
- 6 June – B. T. Mendis, 88, lyricist
- 7 June – Siri Kannangara, 79, sports medical doctor and trainer
- 13 June – Sirinal de Mel, 82, politician, MP (2015–2019)
- 27 June – Hugh Aldons, 99, field hockey (national team), cricket (national team), and rugby union (national team) player
- 30 June – R. Sampanthan, 91, politician, MP (1977–1983, 1997–2000, 2001–2024), Leader of the Opposition (2015–2018)

=== July ===
- 4 July – Sumana Jayathilaka, 87, journalist
- 6 July – Lionel Fernando, 88, civil servant, diplomat, ambassador to France (2008–2010) and governor of North Eastern Province (1993–1994)
- 16 July
  - Manel Chandralatha, 68, actress
  - Dhammika Niroshana, 41, cricketer
- 25 July – Vikramabahu Karunaratne, 81, politician

=== August ===
- 2 August – Galboda Gnanissara Thera, 80, Buddhist monk
- 8 August – Sumana Nellampitiya, 80, radio broadcaster
- 12 August – Alaric Lionel Fernando, film director
- 21 August – Jayantha de Silva, 78, politician
- 23 August – Mohammed Ilyas, 78, politician, 2024 presidential candidate
- 24 August – Rukman Senanayake, 76, politician, MP (1973–1977, 1994–2010)
- 25 August – Sugathapala Senarath Yapa, 88, film director

=== September ===
- 8 September – Sujeewa Harischandra, 59, radio broadcaster
- 11 September – Senaka Batagoda, 65, singer, lyricist
- 22 September – W. Jayasiri, 77, actor
- 23 September – Vajira Chitrasena, 92, dancer
- 28 September – Kumara Welgama, 74, politician, MP (1994–2024) and Minister of Transport (2010–2015)
- 29 September – Deshamanya Rohan de Saram, 85, cellist

=== October ===
- 10 October – W. B. Ekanayake, 76, politician, MP (2000–2015)
- 16 October – Bati Penia, rugby sevens player (national team)
- 22 October – Ajith Ariyaratne, 59, singer

=== November ===
- 17 November – Theja Iddamalgoda, 61, composer
- 25 November – Piyadasa Welikannage, 90, author
- 30 November – Lionel Wijesinghe, 92, dramatist

=== December ===
- 12 December – Rizwan Fa, 47, actor, model
- 16 December – Thilaka Kudahetti, 87, author
- 24 December – Priya Suriyasena, 80, singer
- 25 December – Wasantha Handapangoda, scholar, activist
- 29 December – Nandadasa Rajapaksa, business tycoon
