= Galboda Gnanissara Thera =

Sri Lankan Buddhist monk (1943–2024)

The Venerable Galboda Gnanissara Thera
- ගලබොඩ ඥානිස්සර හිමියන්
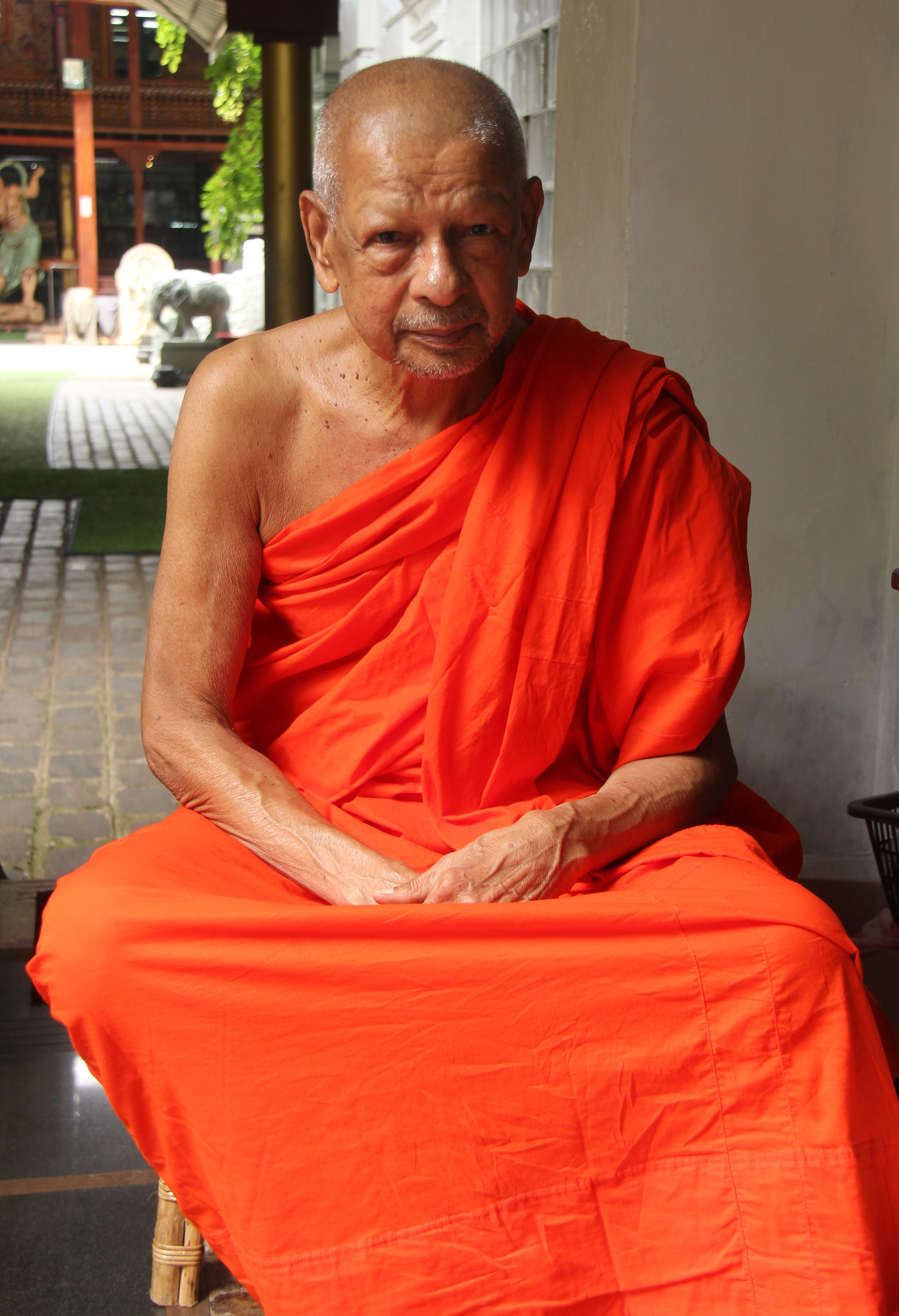
- Thera in 2016
- Title: Chief Incumbent & Sanghanayaka

Personal life
- Born: 14 December 1943 Galboda, British Ceylon
- Died: 2 August 2024 (aged 80) Colombo, Sri Lanka
- Home town: Galboda, Matara
- Other name: Podi Hamuduruwo

Religious life
- Religion: Buddhism
- Temple: Gangaramaya Temple
- Consecration: 1959
- Initiation: Buddhism; November 8, 1954; Colombo

Senior posting
- Teacher: Dewundara Ratanajothi
- Based in: Colombo
- Present post: Chief Incumbent of Gangaramaya Temple & Sanghanayaka of the WP
- Period in office: 1959–2024 & 2003–2024
- Predecessor: Vacissara Nayake Thera

Most Venerable Galboda Gnanissara Thera (පොඩි හාමුදුරුවෝ) (Sinhala: ගලබොඩ ඥානිස්සර හිමියන්; 14 December 1943 – 2 August 2024) was a Sri Lankan Buddhist monk who was the head priest and chief incumbent of the Gangaramaya Temple in Colombo. He was affectionately known as Podi Hamuduruwo (පොඩි හාමුදුරුවෝ), which translates to "Little Monk". In 2003, Thera was appointed by Malwatta chapter as the Sanghanayaka of the Western Province in Sri Lanka. He was also the Sanghanayaka of the Sri Lankan Buddhist temples in the United States but renounced that position later. Thera is widely recognized for various community service endeavors he undertook.

== Early life ==
Galboda Gnanissara Thera was born in 1943 in the village Galboda in the Matara Municipal Council, Sri Lanka.

== Ordination and consecration ==
At age eight, he was brought to the Gangaramaya temple to be ordained. It was then that he was given the name "Podi Hamuduruwo" (Little Monk). Dewundara Ratanajothi Vaccissara Thera who was then the Chief Incumbent of the temple was one of his teachers. By 1959, Devundara Vaccissara Thera was ailing, had become visually impaired and disabled. Due to his disability, the temple leadership, including Vaccissara Thera himself, asked Galboda Gnanissara Thera to take over the temple's administration. He was 16 years old at that time. After taking over administration of the temple, Galboda Gnanissara Thera collected LKR 500 to meet the medical expenses of ailing Devundara Vaccissara Thera.

In 2003, Thera was appointed by the Malwatta Chapter as the Sanghanayaka of the Western Province in Sri Lanka. He was also the Sanghanayaka of the Sri Lankan Buddhist temples in the United States but renounced the position later. The Asgiriya Chapter awarded him "Darshana Visharada", equivalent to a doctoral degree.

== Community service ==
Galboda Gnanissara Thera initiated several community service projects in Sri Lanka, Staten Island, Birmingham and in Singapore. The community services are primarily in the fields of vocational education, homeless shelters for children and elderly people, sanitation and cleanliness. In the field of vocational education, the Gangaramaya temple provides free vocational training. Over 7,000 people attend the classes daily, and training for over 50 technical courses is provided. Training is held at the Sri Jinaratana Training Institute and some of the subjects are secretarial courses, English language, electronics, motor mechanism, bricolage (tinkering), painting, blacksmith, welding, electric wiring etc.

Thera started a retirement home, which is operated by the Gangaramaya temple in Kataragama. The home is run primarily as a homeless shelter for older people who have been abandoned by their families or have no family. In Kataragama and in Kotte, he has started orphanages. Open to children from all religions, the orphanages provide shelter, schooling, and upbringing to children abandoned by their parents. Children with intellectual disability and physical disability are also accommodated there.

He also set up the Sumangala Dhamma School and a preschool on the island Singithi Uyana. Towards sanitation and cleanliness, he raised money and donated toiletries and urinals to various monastic schools in Sri Lanka. Setting an example and to promote sanitation and cleanliness, he was seen cleaning toilets.

Thera died on 2 August 2024, at the age of 80.

== See also ==
- Gangaramaya Temple
- Hikkaduwe Sri Sumangala Thera
- Seema Malaka
