= Rizvi Suhayb =

Sri Lankan rugby player (died 2024)

Rizvi Suhayb (died 26 September 2024), also spelt as Rizvie Suhayb or Rizwie Suhayb or Rizvi Suhaib, was a Sri Lankan rugby sevens and rugby union player. During his playing career, he played predominantly in the position of a centre three quarter. He shot to fame and limelight for captaining his school rugby team S. Thomas' College, Mount Lavinia to title winning campaigns in 1989.

== Career ==
Suhayb pursued his interest in rugby from his schooling days when he played for St. Thomas College in school rugby competitions. He played a pivotal role in steering St. Thomas College to title triumphs arguably came in the year 1989, winning the League and the President's Trophy Knock-Out final against their rivals Isipathana College.

After completing his schooling, he ventured and plied his trade in club rugby by taking part in prestigious domestic club rugby competitions in Sri Lanka. He made his club rugby debut with the Ceylonese Rugby & Football Club and played as an integral part of the club up until 1991 before switching to play for the Kandy Sports Club. During his stint with Kandy Sports Club, he shared dressing room with prominent Fijian expat players including Bati Penia. His remarkable achievement with Kandy Sports Club came in the year 1992 when his side won the Clifford Cup. He also showed up for the Sri Lankan Youth Under20 rugby team for their friendly tour of Thailand in 1989.

== Death ==
Suhayb died on 26 September 2024 at the age of 54 after suffering from a brief illness. His Janazah took place on 27 September 2024 at the Jawatte Muslim Burial Grounds and his funeral was attended by his former teammates and colleagues.
