= Gangaramaya Temple =

Buddhist temple in Colombo, Sri Lanka

- ගංගාරාම විහාරය
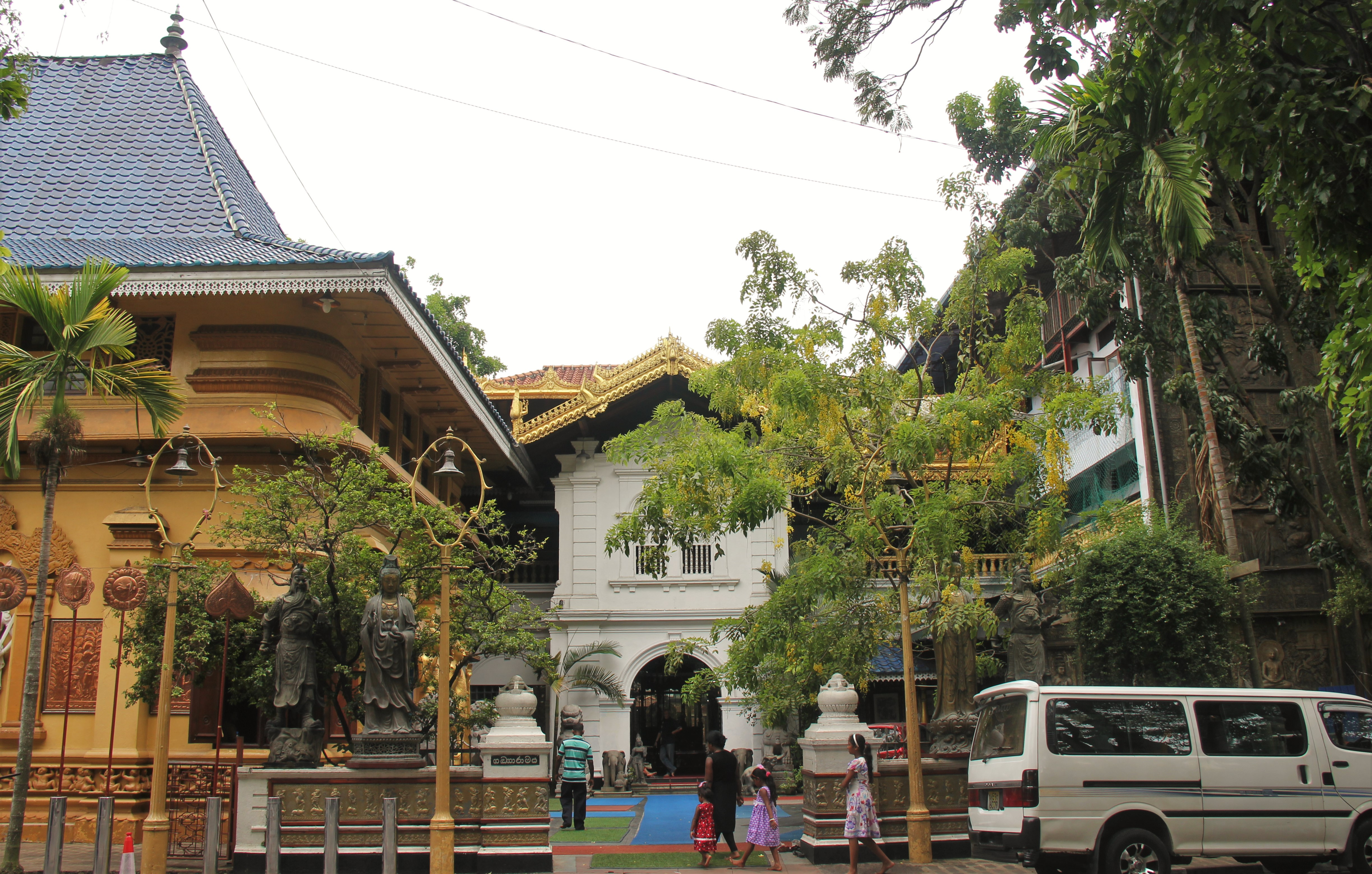
- Gangaramaya Temple

- Location within Greater Colombo

Religion
- Affiliation: Buddhism

Location
- Location: 61 Sri Jinarathana Rd, Colombo, Colombo, 00200
- Country: Sri Lanka
- Coordinates: 6°54′59″N 79°51′23″E

Architecture
- Founder: Hikkaduwe Sri Sumangala Thera, Devundera Sri Jinaratana Nayake Thera
- Completed: Late 19th century

Website
- gangaramaya.com

Gangaramaya Temple (Sinhala: ශ්‍රී ගංගාරාම මහාවිහාරය śrī gangārāma mahāwihāraya, Tamil: ஸ்ரீ கங்காராம மகாவிகாரம் Srī Gaṅgārāma Makāvikāram) is one of the most important temples in Colombo, Sri Lanka, being a mix of modern architecture and cultural essence. Located on the Beira Lake, it was completed in the late 19th century.

== Architecture ==
The temple's architecture demonstrates an eclectic mix of Sri Lankan, Thai, Indian, and Chinese architecture.

This Buddhist temple includes several imposing buildings and is situated not far from the placid waters of Beira Lake on a plot of land that was originally a small hermitage on a piece of marshy land. It has the main features of a Vihara (temple), the Cetiya (Pagoda) the Bodhitree, the Vihara Mandiraya, the Seema malaka (assembly hall for monks) and the Relic Chamber. In addition, a museum, a library, a residential hall, a three storeyed Pirivena, educational halls and an alms hall are also on the premises.

Most notable for tourists is the architecture of Seema Malaka, which was built with donations from a Muslim sponsor to the design of Geoffrey Bawa.

== Famous incumbents ==
It was the home for erudite scholars such as Ratmalana Sri Dharmarama Thero, Waskaduwa Sri Subhuti Thero, Weligama Sri Sumangala Thero, Welivitiye Dhammaratna Thero, and Pandit Batuwantudawe.

== History ==
Don Bastian de Silva Jayasuriya Goonewardane, a 19th-century shipping merchant who was seeking suitable land to build a temple for Hikkaduwe Sri Sumangala Thera, bought a beautiful tract belonging to three Moors, and filled and prepared the land at great expense. The land was bordered on two sides by the Moragoda Ela and the Pettigala Ela was used to build the temple, which was subsequently named the Padawthota Gangaramaya Viharaya. The Mudaliyar, with the assistance of the people built a great 'Chaitya' (Dagaba) of 30 Riyans, and built a great decorative arch (thorana) and a 'Sandakada pahana' modeled on the ones found at Anuradhapura, at the entrance to the temple. A 'Bo' sapling brought from the great Sri Maha Bhodiya in Anuradhapura, was planted with his own hands and nurtured. He also built a three-storied preaching hall, walls, railings and the moat around the temple.

== Present day activities ==
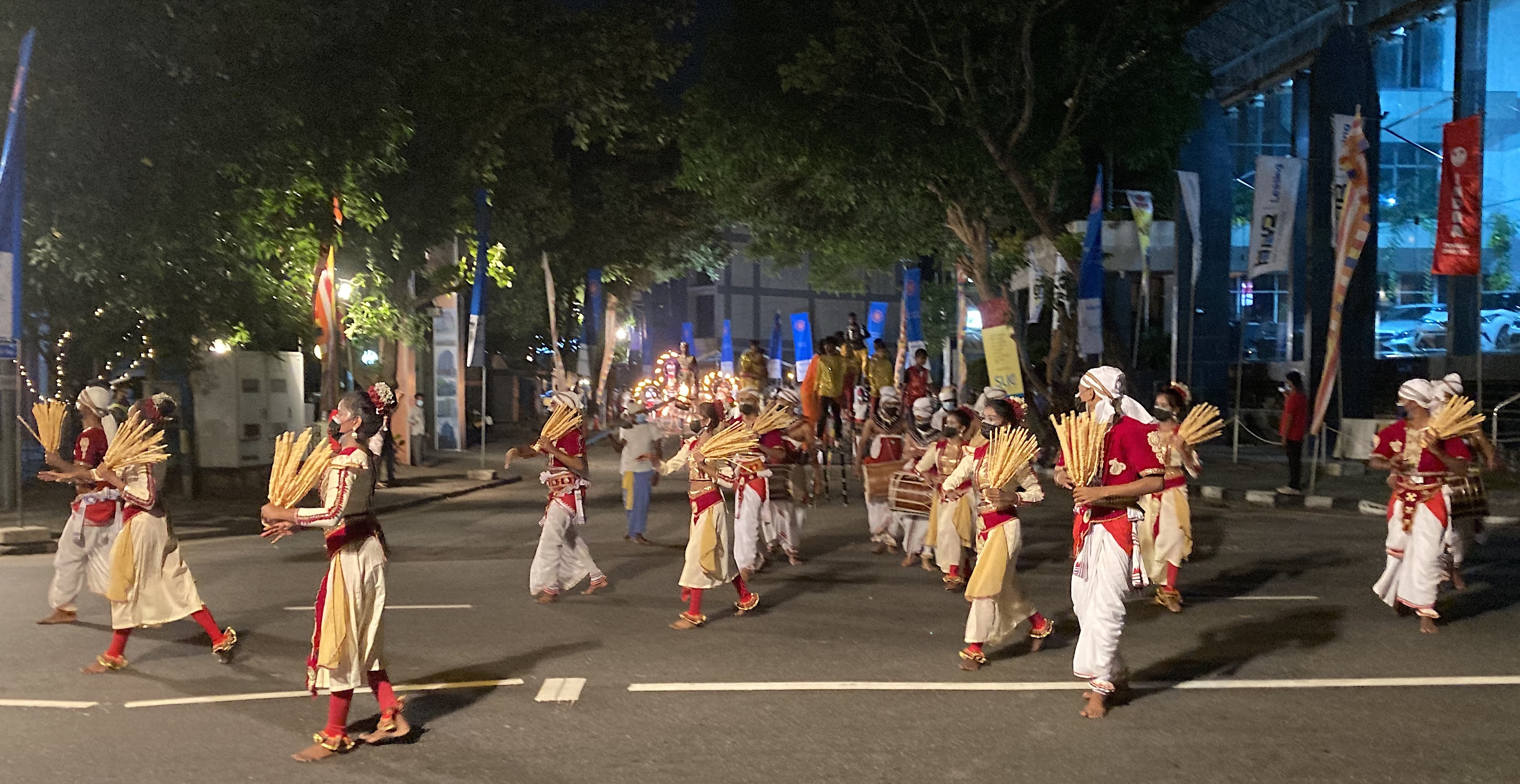
Annual procession of Gangramaya temple known as Nawang Perahera

Today Gangaramaya serves as a place of Buddhist worship and a learning centre. The temple is involved in Buddhist welfare work including old peoples' homes, a vocational school and an orphanage. The temple is uniquely attractive and tolerant of members of many different religions. It has been instrumental in establishing the Buddhist temple on Staten Island (US) the Buddhist Center in New York and the Buddhist Centre in Tanzania, thus helping to propagate the Dhamma in other countries.

== See also ==
- Galboda Gnanissara Thera
- Seema Malaka
