= Chandra Kumara Kandanarachchi =

Sri Lankan singer (1947/1948–2024)

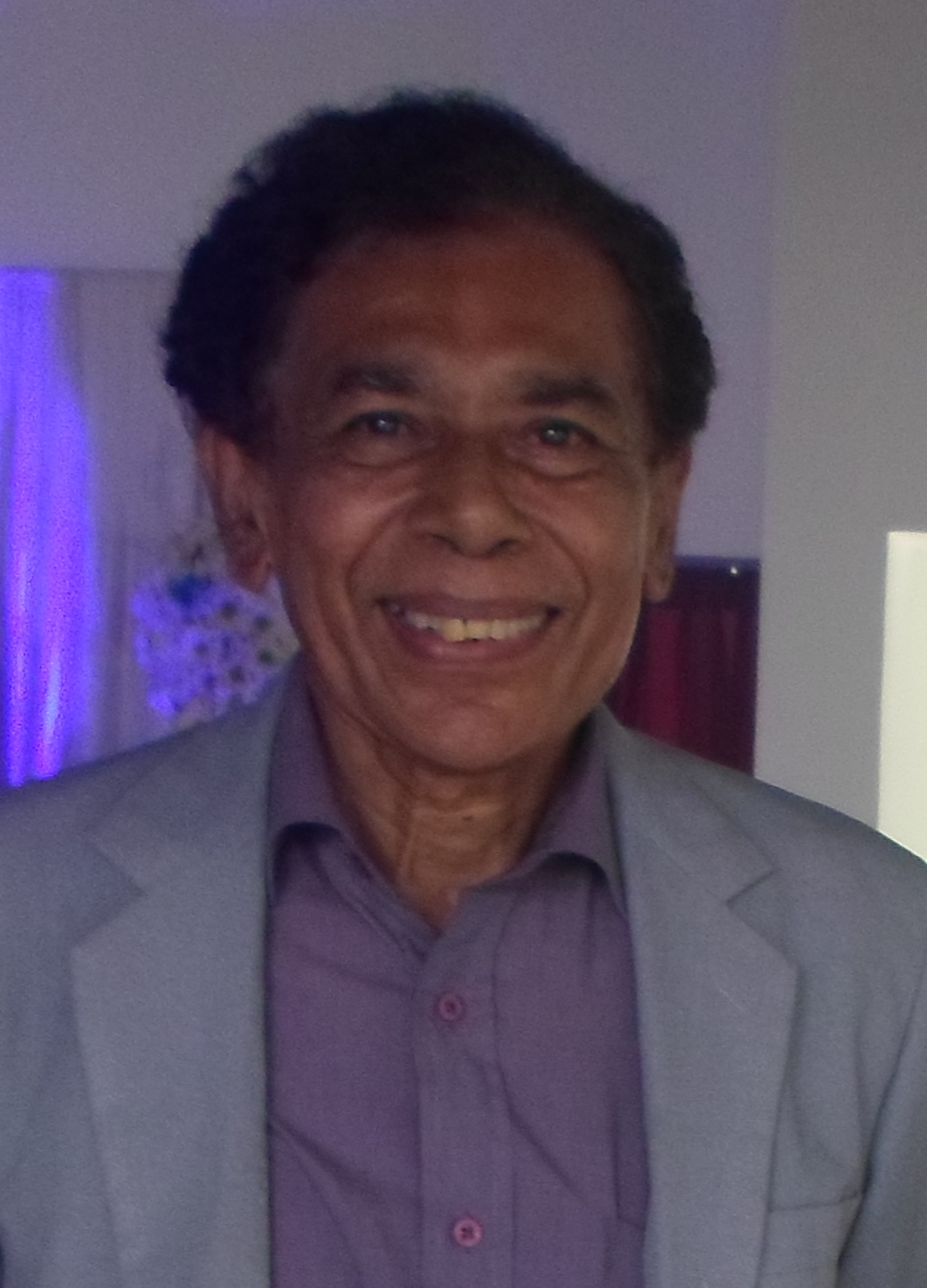
- Kandanarachchi in 2015
- Born: 1947/1948; Ceylon
- Died: 26 March 2024 (aged 76); Maharagama, Sri Lanka
- Occupation: Singer

Chandra Kumara Kandanarachchi (Sinhala: චන්ද්‍ර කුමාර කඳනාරච්චි; 1947/1948 – 26 March 2024) was a Sri Lankan singer.

== Career ==
Kandanarachchi was known for several Sinhala songs including "Ege Sinahawa Thahanam", "Pem Benda Sith Benda", "Ganga Nadee Theeraye", and "Hithe Sathuta Jiwithe".

== Death ==
Kandanarachchi died on 26 March 2024, aged 76. Prior to his death, he had been receiving medical treatment at a hospital in Maharagama.
