= 2024 Fox Hill Supercross race crash =

2024 motorsport accident in Diyatalawa, Sri Lanka

Details
- Date: 21 April 2024
- Location: Diyatalawa, Uva Province
- Coordinates: 06°49′41.8″N 80°57′46.8″E
- Country: Sri Lanka
- Operator: Sri Lanka Military Academy
- Cause: Drivers lost control

Statistics
- Vehicles: 2
- Deaths: 7
- Injured: 21

The 2024 Fox Hill Supercross race crash was a fatal motorsport race crash that occurred on 21 April 2024 at the Fox Hill racing track in Diyatalawa, Uva Province, Sri Lanka. Seven spectators died and around 21 people were admitted to the hospital after sustaining critical injuries. The crash was caused when two racing cars apparently lost control and collided with a group of spectators during the 17th race of the 1500cc Ford Laser Mazda 323 category.

The motorsport event was organised by the Sri Lanka Military Academy in collaboration with Sri Lanka Automobile Sports and the Sri Lanka Army Motor Sports Committee. The event featured a grand total of 24 racing events, including 12 motorcycle and motorcar events each. The organizers had opened up the event to spectators for free of charge and it was estimated that around 100,000 people were present to watch the motorsport event.

== Background ==
The Fox Hill Supercross is an annual racing event hosted by the Sri Lanka Military Academy intending to raise funds to manifest and elevate the infrastructure and training facilities of the military academy. The Fox Hill Supercross was first hosted in 1993 and has since become the most sought-after motorsport event in Sri Lanka. The motorsport event is held annually on a two-kilometre gravel track that is built amidst mountainous terrain within the Military Academy shooting range in Diyathalawa.

In 2024, the Fox Hill Supercross race made its comeback after a five-year hiatus, as it was last held in 2019. The Fox Hill Supercross race was cancelled for the past few years due to restrictions imposed by authorities owing to the COVID-19 pandemic and later due to concerns related to the Sri Lankan economic crisis. The 2024 edition was the 28th edition of the Fox Hill Supercross race, and the racing event garnered around 270 entries, including 150 cars and 120 bikes. This also marked the first instance in Fox Hill Supercross history that a single edition had received 150 car entries, as the event history suggests, otherwise often generating 120 car entries in general in the race's history.

== Crash ==
The crash happened during the course of the motorsport event when two racing cars collided with a group of spectators leaving seven people dead. Four officials of the racing event who were stationed as flag marshals were also among the casualties. The crash also killed an eight-year old child who was one of the spectators during the event. Five people reportedly died at the crash site, and two people who sustained severe injuries later succumbed to death at the hospital. According to Police spokesperson Nihal Talduwa, he told BBC Sinhala that the accident occurred when the car jumped out of the running lane. The organisers eventually decided to temporarily suspend the remaining racing events following the fatal crash.

Officials attempted to slow cars down around the scene by waving yellow lights, but as the cars sped past, one red car veered off course and crashed into spectators on the side of the unguarded track. Eyewitness claimed that during one of the car races in the afternoon session (Sri Lankan local time), a vehicle bearing the number '71' overturned, prompting race marshals to signal a caution with yellow flags. Unexpectedly, amidst this commotion, another car veered off the track, careening into a group of spectators. Initially, reports speculated that the cars that collided with spectators were numbered '5' and '196', but authorities have yet to officially confirm these details.

Video footage of the disaster went viral on social media as they captured the visibly shaken drivers receiving medical attention from paramedics. The injured people were admitted at both Diyatalawa Base Hospital and Badulla General Hospital for treatment.

== Aftermath ==
Two racing drivers who participated in the racing event were arrested by the police for the incident, and both were remanded to 30 April by the Bandarawela Magistrate's Court. The drivers were arrested on charges of dangerous driving and were produced on court on 22 April.

The Sri Lanka Army made a decision to appoint a special investigation committee consisting of 7 senior officers chaired by a Major General in order to conduct inquiries and probe over the fatal crash which took place. The Sri Lanka Police also launched investigations by recording key statements from the organisers of the event, and it was revealed that the dust on the racing track was not appropriately dampened, which may have led to the fatal crash.
