= Seema Malaka =

Buddhist temple in Colombo, Sri Lanka

- සීමා මාලකය
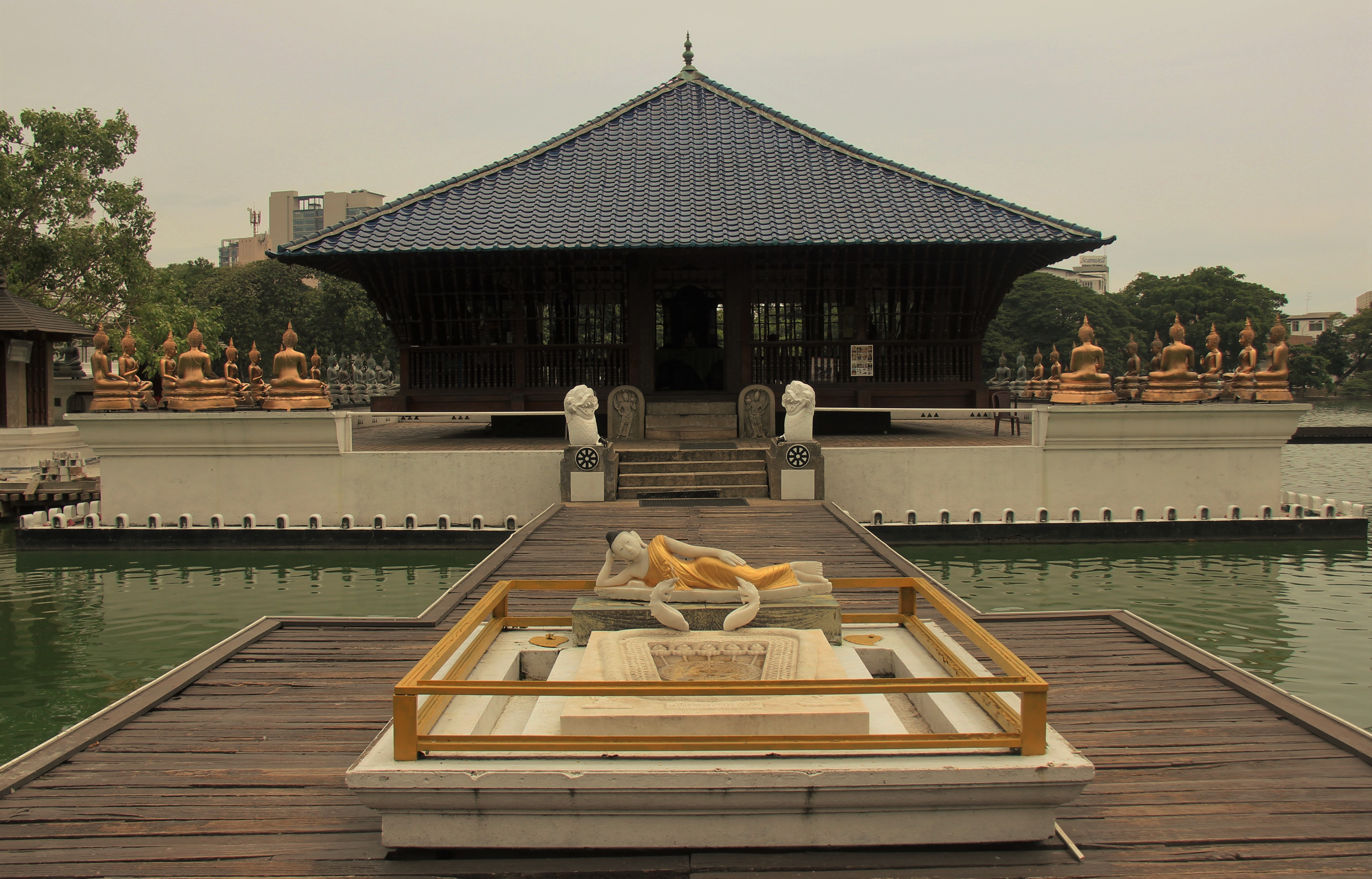
- Seema Malaka in May 2016

- Location within Central Colombo

Religion
- Affiliation: Buddhism
- Deity: Lord Buddha smaller shrines dedicated to Guanyin, Kataragama deviyo, Upulvan, Sri Siddha Suniyam Deviyo and Ganesha

Location
- Location: Beira Lake, Sir James Pieris Mawatha, Colombo
- Country: Sri Lanka
- Interactive map of Seema Malaka
- Coordinates: 6°55′3.4428″N 79°51′11.7252″E

Architecture
- Founder: Hikkaduwe Sri Sumangala Thera, Devundera Sri Jinaratana Nayake Thera
- Completed: Late 19th century

Website
- gangaramaya.com

Seema Malaka (Sinhala: සීමා මාලකය) is a Buddhist temple in Colombo, Sri Lanka. The temple is mainly used for meditation and rest, rather than for worship. Situated in the Beira Lake, the temple was originally constructed in the late 19th century. Seema Malaka is a part of the Gangaramaya Temple and is situated few hundred meters to its east.

== History ==
Seema Malaka was originally constructed in the late 19th century. The original structure slowly sank into the water in 1970s. In 1976, Sri Lankan architect Geoffrey Bawa was brought in to redesign and construct the temple, which stands today. The reconstruction was funded by a Sri Lankan Muslim businessman, S. H. Musaji, and his wife, in memory of their son Ameer S. Musaji.

== Construction ==
Seema Malaka was redesigned by Geoffrey Bawa in 1976 after the original structure slowly sank; the temple is in the middle of the Beira Lake and the design was inspired by the ancient monasteries in forests of Anuradhapura and Ritigala.

The temple is constructed on three platforms over water, which are connected to the mainland and with each other by pontoon bridges. The temple's main roof is covered with blue color tiles and the temple is made from collected spindles and handrails in wooden finishes. The architecture of the edifice resembles the Kandyan era. All three platforms have numerous seated Buddha statues displaying different mudras. The main (central) platform houses wooden paneled shelter for meditation. On one of the side platforms is the Bodhi Tree which was grown from a branch of the Jaya Sri Maha Bodhi tree in Anuradhapura. The four corners of the side platform have small shrines dedicated to Shiva, Vishnu, Kataragama deviyo and Ganesha. A shrine dedicated to Guanyin is found at the entrance to the temple and another statue of Guanyin is also found within the temple complex.

== Picture gallery ==
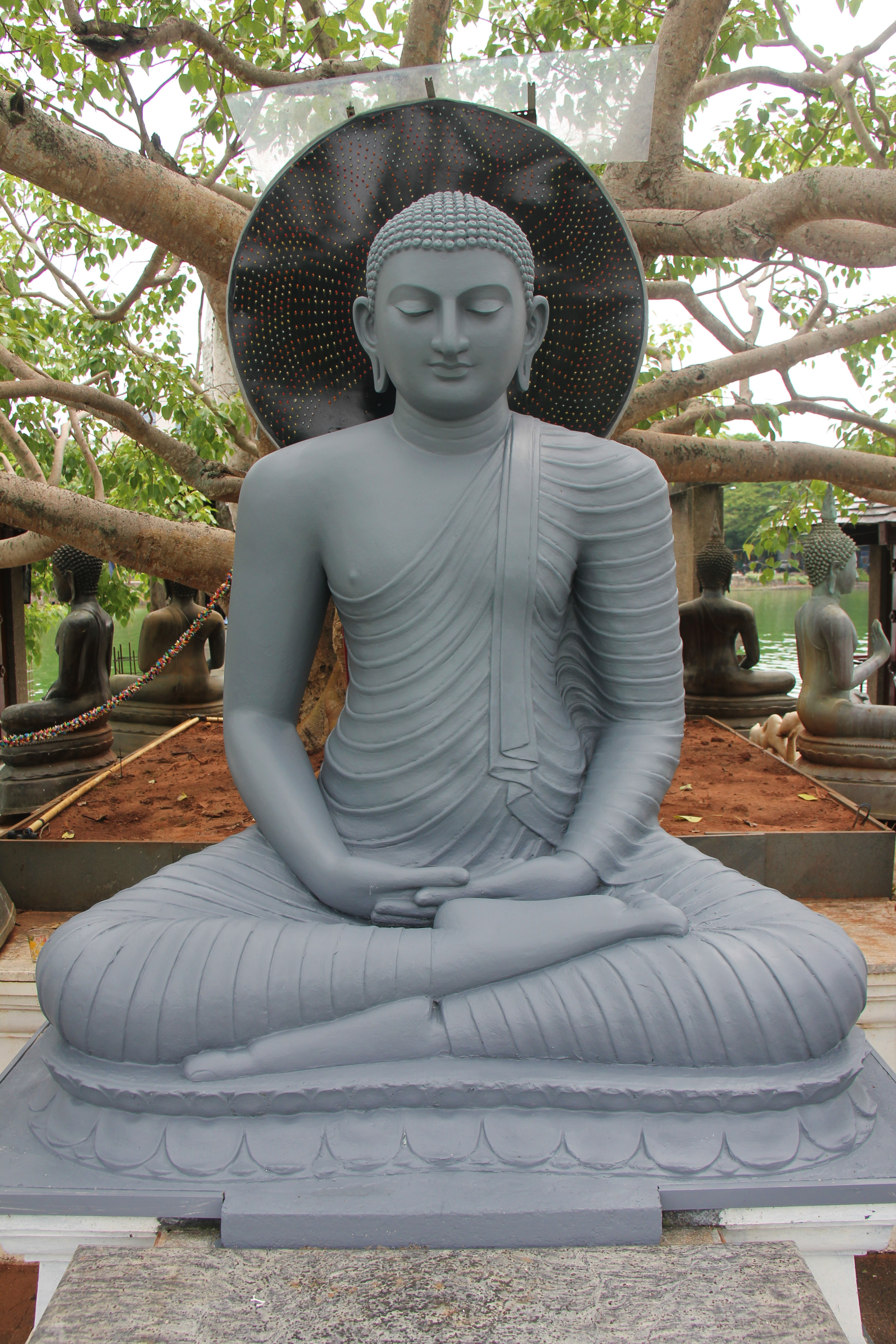
Buddha statue under the Bodhi Tree

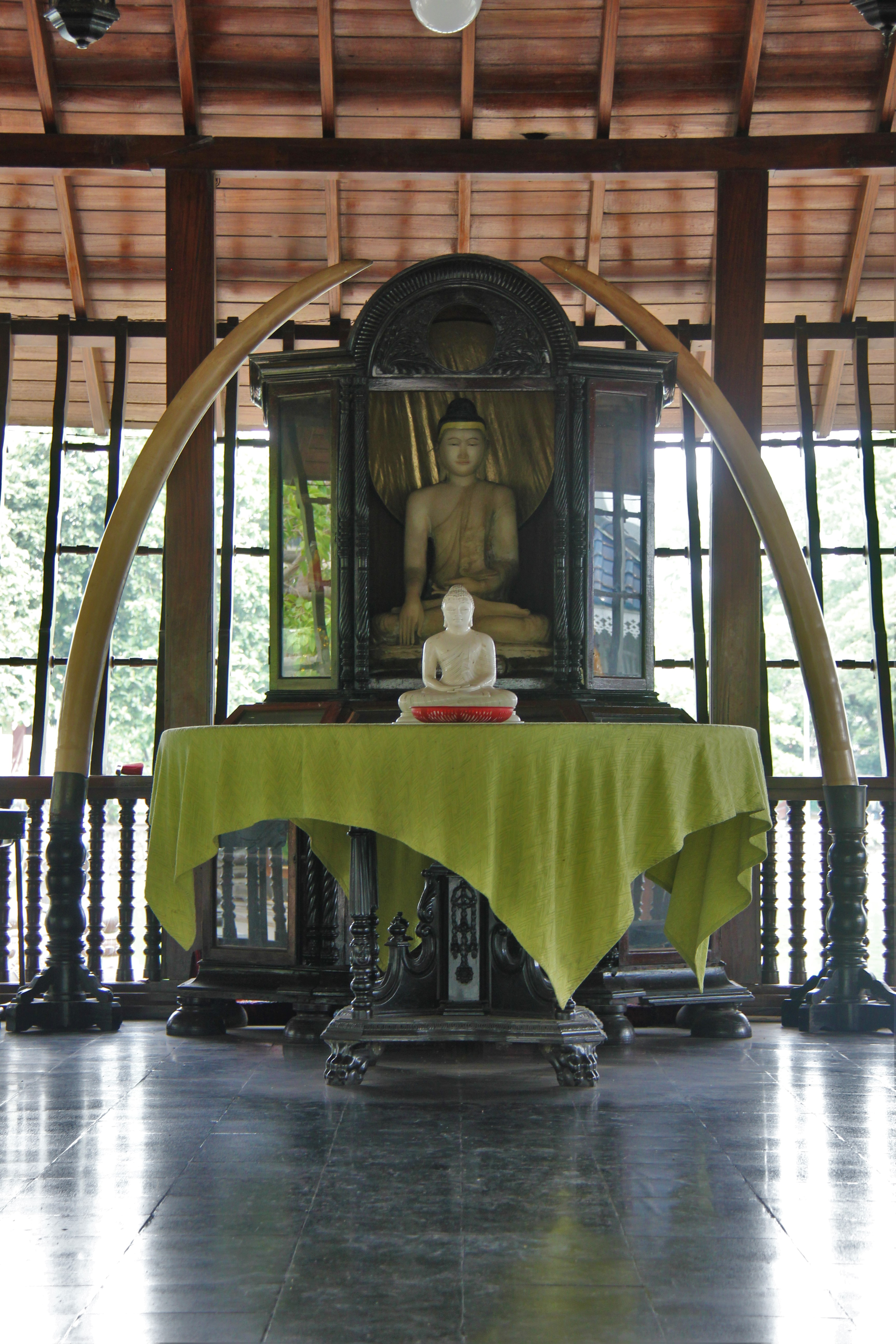
Main hall of the temple

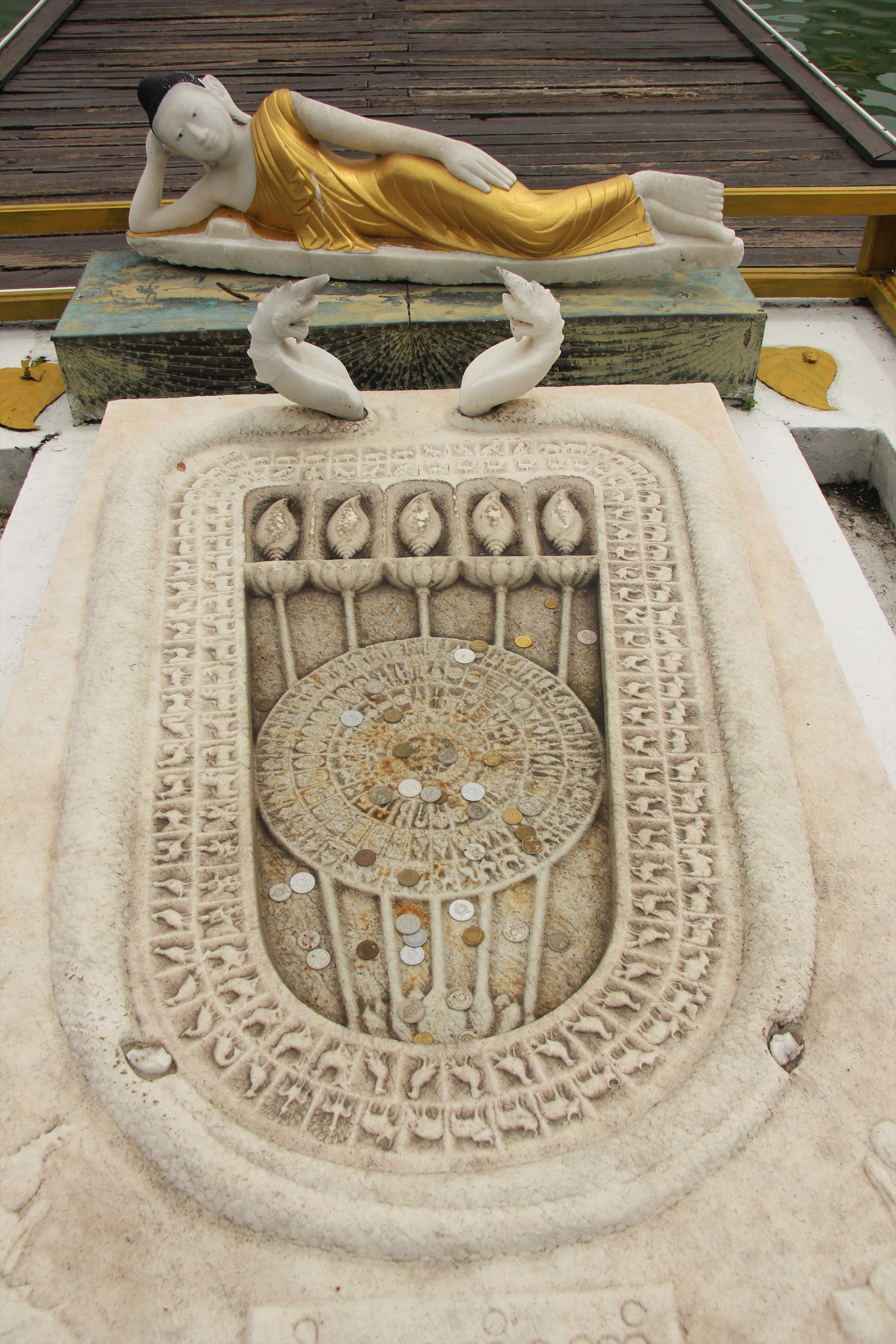
Buddha footprint at temple entrance

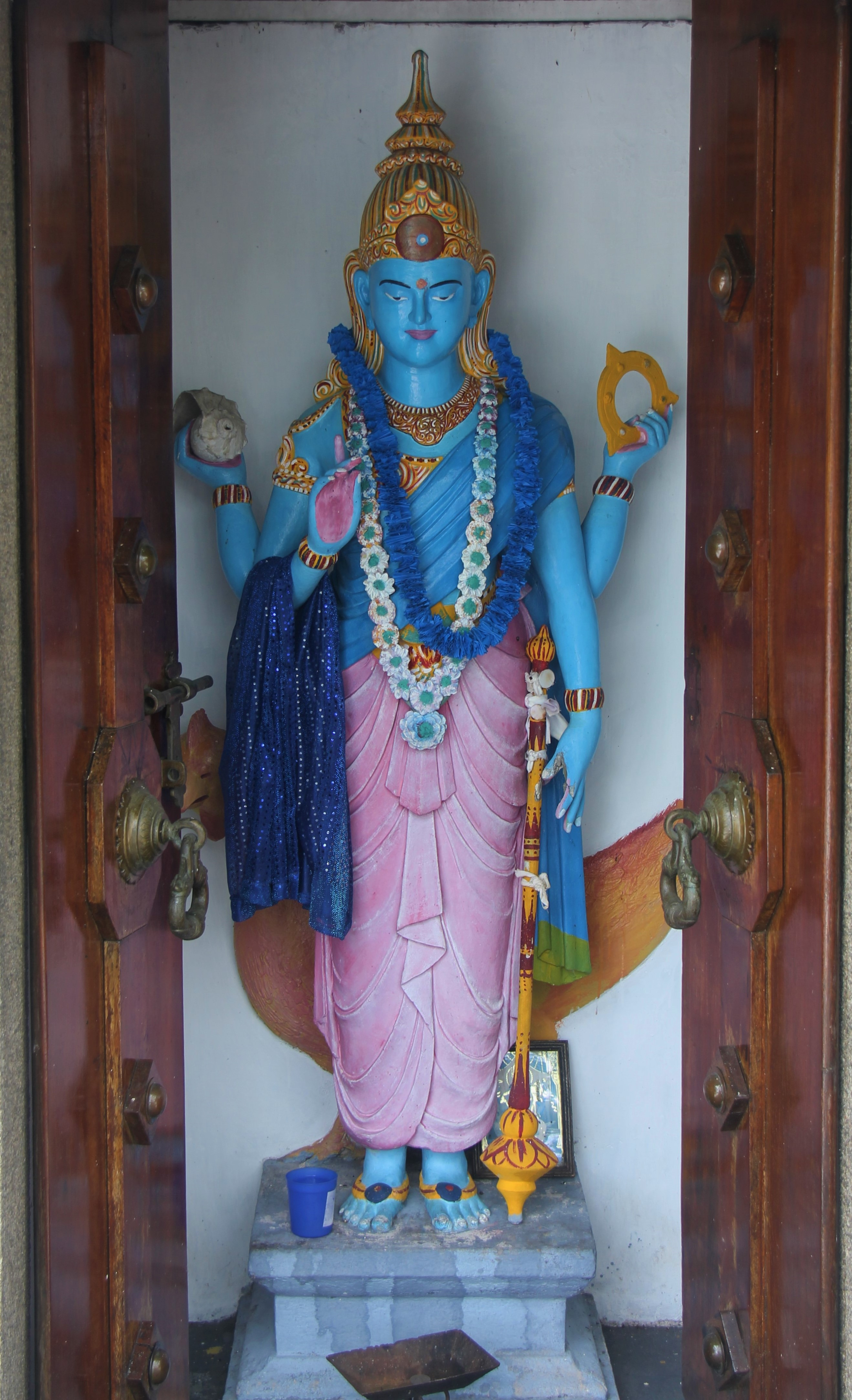
Vishnu statue in the temple

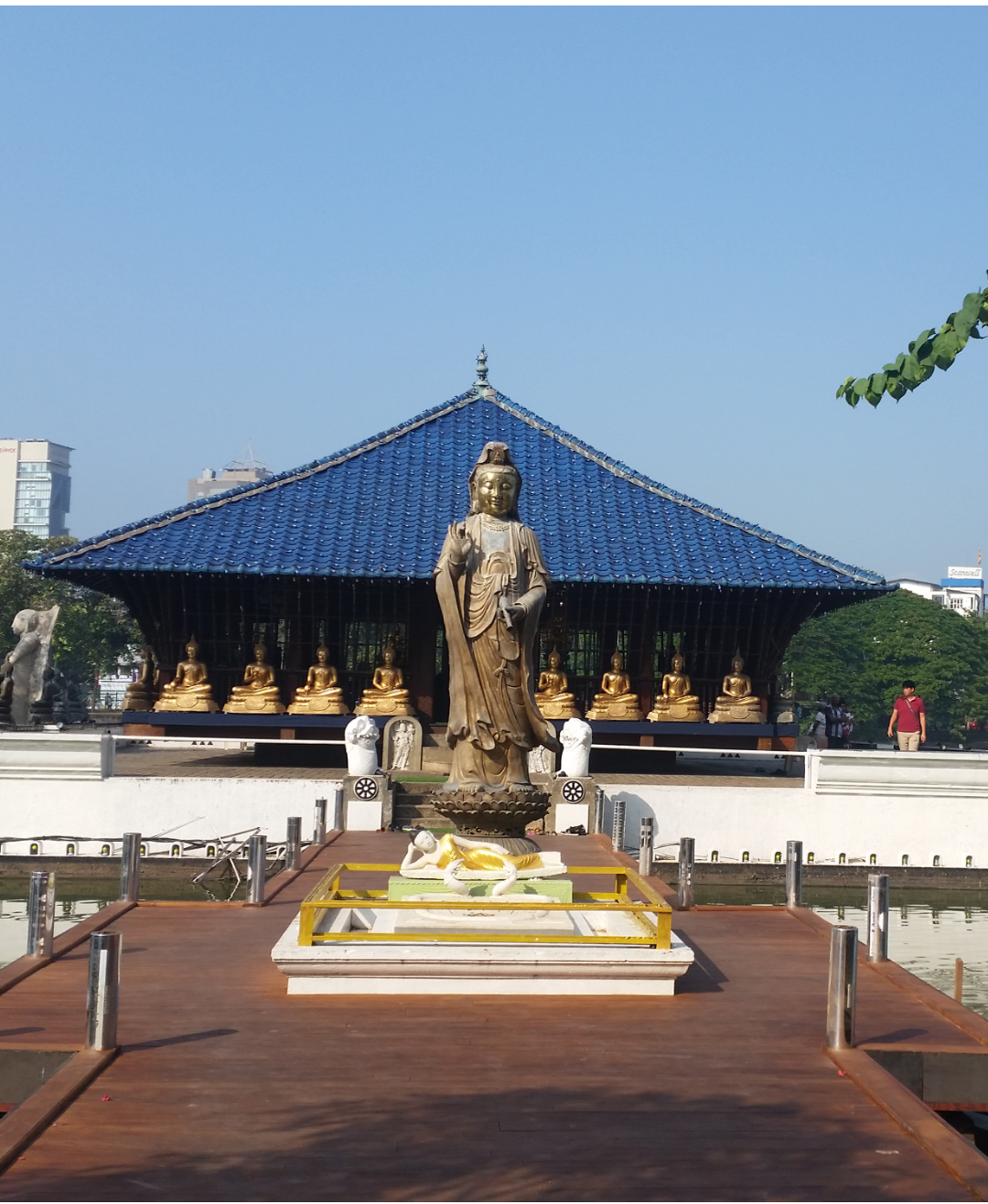
Guanyin statue in front of main temple hall

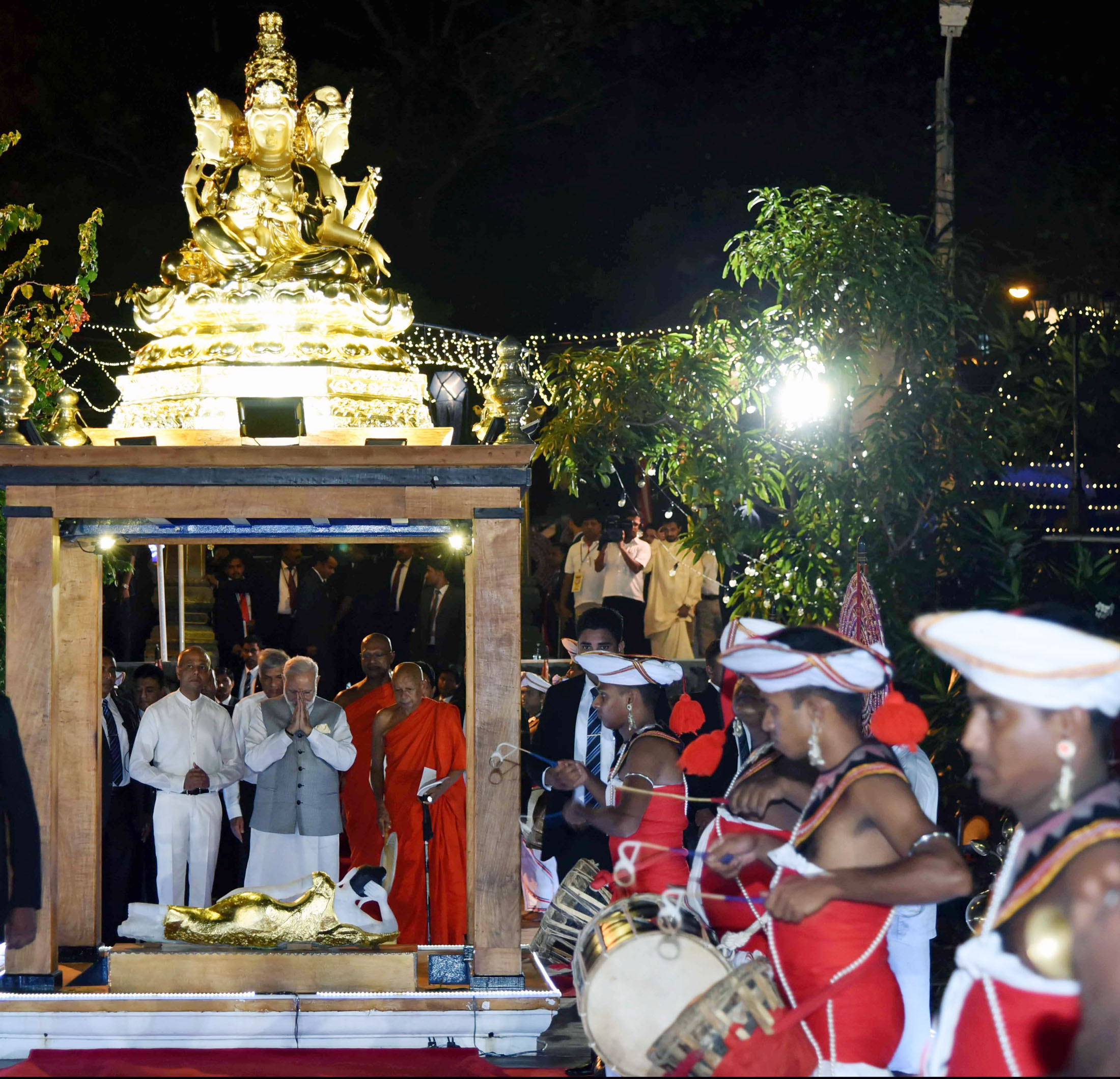
Guanyin shrine at the entrance to the main temple hall
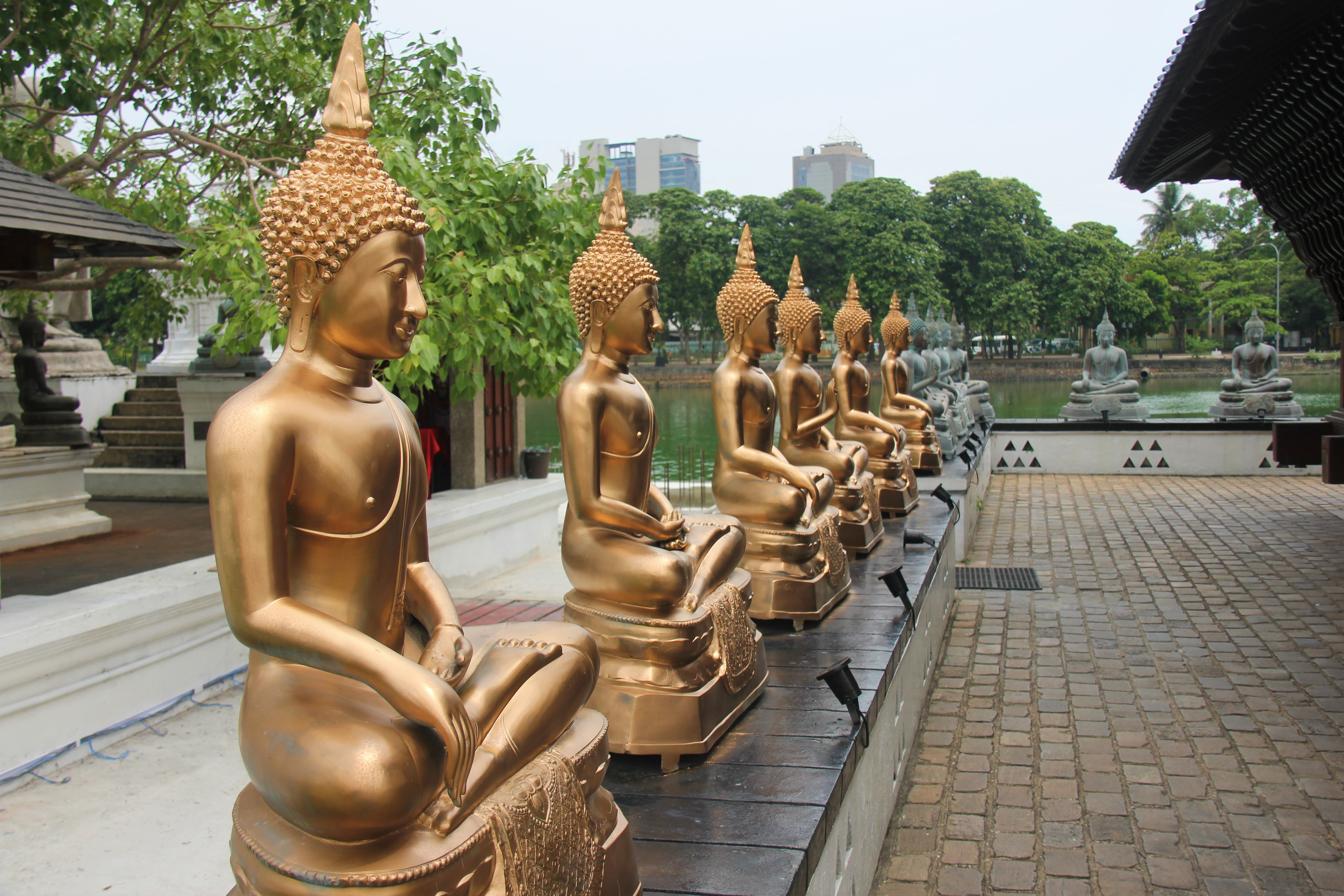
Buddha statues in different Mudras towards South side of the temple

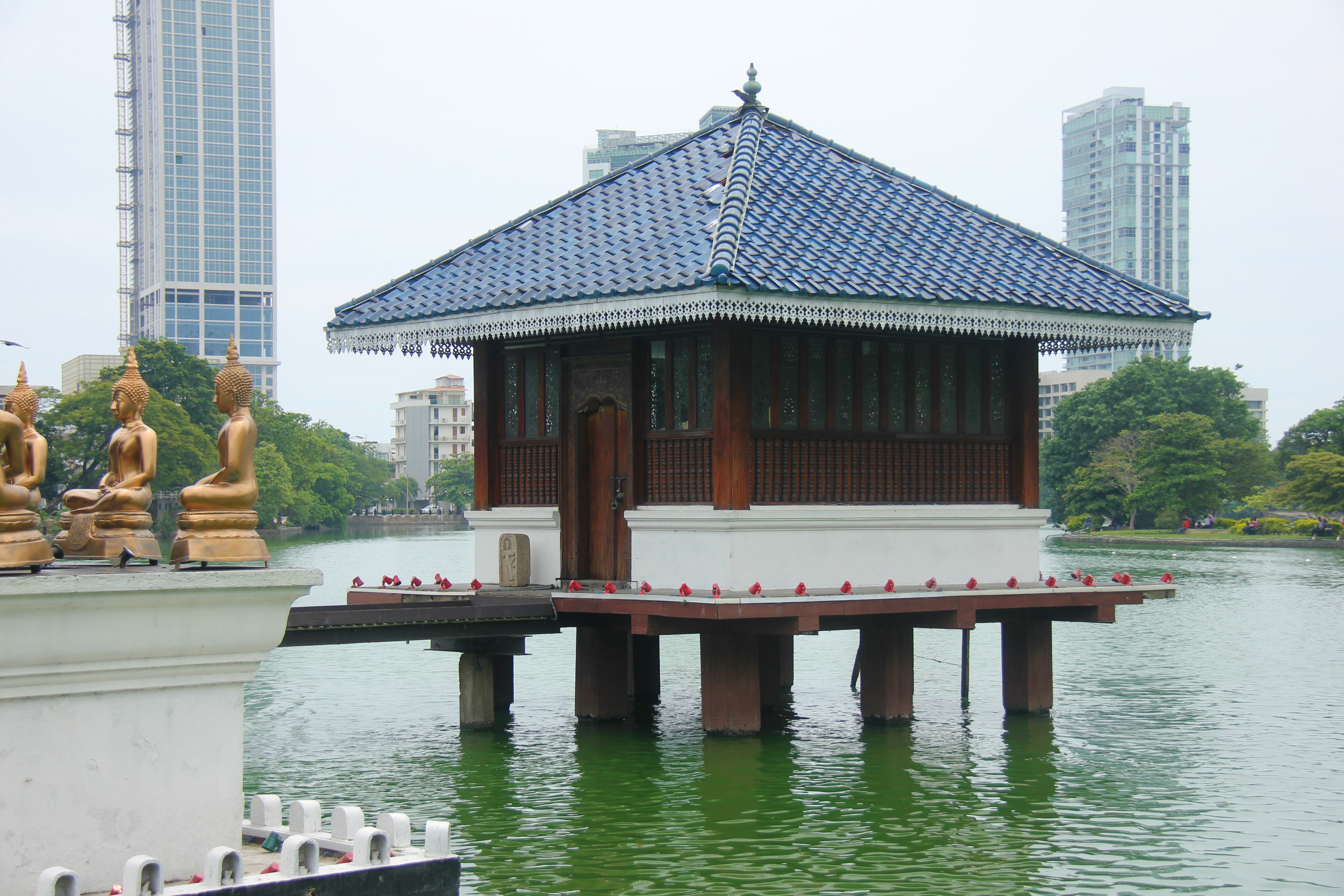
North side platform

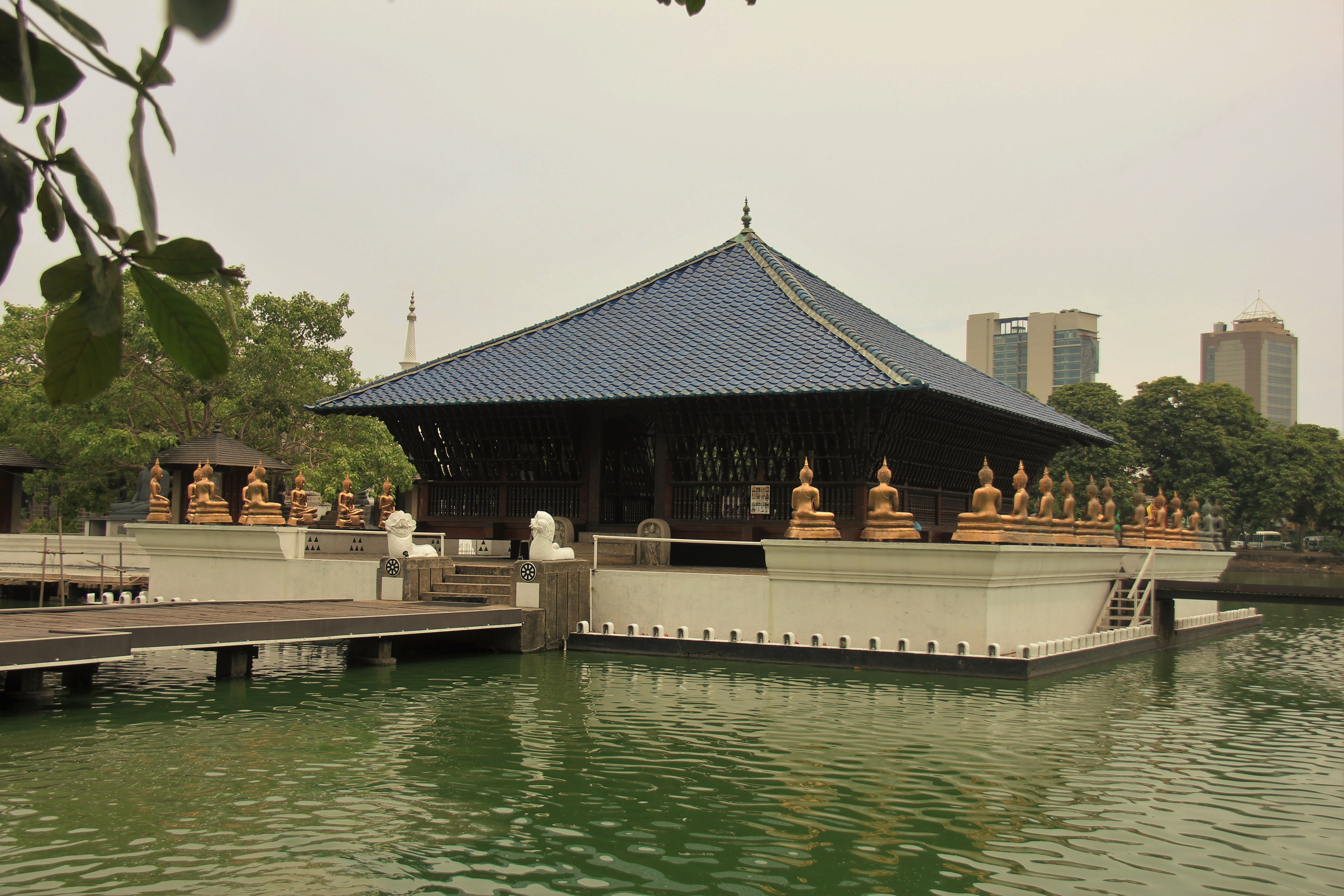
Main hall with Bodhi Tree in background

== Location ==
Seema Malaka is situated in the Beira Lake in Colombo, Sri Lanka. It is situated 34 kilometres (21 mi) south of Bandaranaike International Airport and 2 kilometres (1.2 mi) south-east of Galle Face Green.
