= Bati Penia =

Sri Lankan-Fijian rugby sevens player (died 2024)

Bati Penia (also spelt Bati Ponai; died 16 October 2024) was a Sri Lankan-Fijian rugby sevens player. He predominantly played in the role of centre three quarter during his playing career. Born in Fiji with a Fijian heritage, he went on to represent Sri Lanka national rugby sevens team in 1992.

== Career ==
Being a Fijian, he switched allegiance on a temporary basis representing the Sri Lanka President's Sevens Team at the Cathay Pacific Hong Kong Rugby Sevens. He joined the Kandy Sports Club in 1992 and played alongside fellow Fijian expatriate players Kitoni Ratudrada and Willie Monny Satala for the club in tournaments including the Caltex Premier League inter-club rugby championship. He also shared dressing room with Sri Lankan players including Priyantha Ekanayake, L. V. Ekanayake, Imthi Marikar, Maurice Joachim and Rizvi Suhayb during his short stint with Kandy Sports Club.

== Death ==
Penia died in Fiji on 16 October 2024. His death was confirmed by Sri Lanka Rugby on its official Facebook page. There were little contradictions based on how the pronunciation of his original name was reported by Sri Lanka Rugby and the Sri Lankan English daily newspaper Daily Mirror following his death. Sri Lanka Rugby in its tribute post mentioned his name as Bati Penia whereas Daily Mirror reported his name as Bati Ponai.
