= 2024 Sri Lanka floods =

Natural disaster in Sri Lanka

- Date: May–June 2024
- Location: Colombo, Ratnapura, Matara and Galle Districts, Sri Lanka
- Cause: Heavy rainfall
- Deaths: 16+
- Injuries: 5+
- Property damage: 12,000+ homes
- Displaced: 6,000+ evacuated

Between May and June 2024, heavy monsoon rains in Sri Lanka would lead to flash floods, mudslides, and falling trees across the western and southern parts of the island. The floods killed at least 16 people and affected 20 out of the country's 25 districts, with some areas reporting over 400 mm (16 in) of rain. At least five people were injured by mudslides in Ratnapura, over 12,000 homes were damaged, and over 6,000 people needed to be evacuated.

== Impact ==
=== Casualties ===
Fifteen people were killed. The dead include three members of the same family who drowned near the capital Colombo, an 11-year-old girl. and a 20-year-old man who was buried alive in the mudslide, and nine others who were crushed to death by falling trees.

=== Displacement ===
The floods displaced thousands of people. More than 5,000 people were taken to 52 temporary shelters. About 4,000 homes were damaged, and 28 were completely destroyed.

=== Education ===
The floods also affected education in the country. All schools in the country were closed as a result of the floods, affecting about 4 million children.

== Response ==
The Sri Lanka Army was mobilised to provide relief to the affected people. Rescue teams were deployed in the affected areas and essential items were provided to the children and families. Save the Children supported the government's response efforts.

== Aftermath ==
The aftermath of the flood saw rebuilding and rehabilitation efforts. Sri Lankan President Ranil Wickremesinghe indicated that houses destroyed by the flood would be rebuilt within two months with the help of the armed forces, police, and government.
