= Galboda =

Galboda ගල්බොඩ கல்போடா
- Interactive map of Galboda
- Country: Sri Lanka
- Province: Southern Province
- Time zone: UTC+5:30 (Sri Lanka Standard Time)

Galboda (Sinhala: ගල්බොඩ, Tamil: கல்போடா) is a small town in Sri Lanka. It is located within Southern Province.

== See also ==
- List of towns in Southern Province, Sri Lanka
