= 2023 in Sri Lanka =

- Decades: 2000s; 2010s; 2020s
- See also: Other events of 2023; Timeline of Sri Lankan history

The following lists notable events that took place during the year 2023 in Sri Lanka.

== Incumbents ==
=== National ===
President	Prime Minister	Speaker	Chief Justice	Opposition Leader
Ranil Wickremesinghe (Age 74)	Dinesh Gunawardena (Age 74)	Mahinda Yapa Abeywardena (Age 78)	Jayantha Jayasuriya	Sajith Premadasa (Age 56)
United National Party (since 21 July 2022)	Sri Lanka Podujana Peramuna (since 22 July 2022)	Sri Lanka Podujana Peramuna (since 20 August 2020)	Independent (since 29 April 2019)	Samagi Jana Balawegaya (since 3 January 2020)

=== Provincial ===
Governors

- Central Province – Lalith U Gamage
- Eastern Province – Senthil Thondaman
- North Central Province – Maheepala Herath
- Northern Province – P. S. M. Charles
- North Western Province – Lakshman Yapa Abeywardena
- Sabaragamuwa Province – Navin Dissanayake
- Southern Province – Willy Gamage
- Uva Province – A. J. M. Muzammil
- Western Province – Roshan Goonatilake

Chief Ministers

- Central Province – Vacant
- Eastern Province – Vacant
- North Central Province – Vacant
- Northern Province – Vacant
- North Western Province – Vacant
- Sabaragamuwa Province – Vacant
- Southern Province – Vacant
- Uva Province – Vacant
- Western Province – Vacant

== Events ==
- 2019–present Sri Lankan economic crisis
- Operation Yukthiya

== Events by month ==
=== January ===
- 5 January – Randimal Gamage, a frontline activist of the 2022 Sri Lankan protests, is arrested at the Bandaranaike International Airport.
- 8 January – The Maho-Omanthai stretch of the Northern Railway Line begins renovations at the Medawachchiya railway station.
- 9 January – Senior Superintendent of Police (SSP) of Monaragala Sisira Kumara is arrested after 350 cannabis plants and a metal detector are found in his possession.
- 10 January
  - Canada imposes sanctions on former presidents Mahinda Rajapaksa and Gotabaya Rajapaksa and two members of the Sri Lankan Army, Staff Sergeant Sunil Ratnayake and Lieutenant Commander Chandana Prasad Hettiarachchi, over "gross and systematic violations of human rights" during the Sri Lankan Civil War.
  - Athuraliye Rathana Thero is appointed as the president of South Asian Buddhist Forum.
- 15 January – The weekend special tourist train "Seethawaka Odyssey" commences operations, which is operational on the Kelani Valley railway line and runs from Colombo Fort to the Waga Railway Station.
- 20 January
  - The first ever 3D Sri Lankan animation film Gajaman is released theatrically.
  - Seven people are killed and dozens are injured by a school bus collision in Colombo.
  - 31-year-old Thilini Nishadi alias "Teena", a close associate of notorious drug trafficker Nadun Chinthaka Wickremaratne alias "Harak Kata", is arrested. Police apprehend 12 grams and 800 milligrams of heroin which were in her possession.
- 23 January
  - The 2022 G.C.E. Advanced Level examinations commence at 2,200 centers across the island, with a total of 278,196 school applicants and 53,513 private candidates.
  - Sri Lankan cricket all-rounder Wanindu Hasaranga is included in the ICC Men's T20I Team of the Year while Sri Lankan left-arm spinner Inoka Ranaweera is included in the Women's T20I Team of the Year 2022.
- 29 January – Large-scale drug trafficker and organized criminal gang member Malalage Sudath Kithsiri Thushara, alias 'Weliwita Sudda', is arrested with 13 grams of heroin in his possession at Kotelawala, Kaduewela. Thuppahi Mudalige, alias 'Adadola Ranga', identified as a close associate of notorious crime figure Sobanahandi Jayalath de Silva, alias 'Karandeniye Sudda' is also arrested with 15 grams of heroin in his possession.
- 30 January – A large-scale drug trafficker, Dharmakeerthi Udeni Inuka Perera, alias 'Disco', was arrested while in possession of drugs and sharp weapons.
- 31 January – Notorious underworld figure 'Kalutara Sudda', wanted for nine crimes, is arrested alongside two suspected female accomplices.

=== February ===
- 3 February – 2023 Sri Lankan national honours: Former Speaker of the Parliament Karu Jayasuriya is conferred with the honorary Sri Lankabhimanya award, the highest national honour of Sri Lanka, by President Ranil Wickremesinghe.
- 4 February – 75th anniversary of Sri Lankan independence from the British Empire.
- 11 February – ACTC MP Selvarajah Kajendren and 17 others are arrested in Jaffna.
- 16 February – Notorious drug dealer named Prasad Priyankara alias "Chanthu" from Andiambalama, accused of multiple crimes is killed after being gunned down in Boragodawatta, Minuwangoda.
- 19 February – The Temple of the Tooth Relic in Kandy hosts a 'Janaraja Perahera', the first since 1987, which was organized in light of the 75th independence celebrations.
- 23 February – SLPP parliamentarian Prof. Ranjith Bandara is appointed as chairman of the Committee on Public Enterprises (COPE) in Parliament.
- 24 February
  - State Minister Lasantha Alagiyawanna is appointed as chairperson of the Committee on Public Accounts (COPA).
  - Sri Lankan-born, Harvard-educated Professor Antony Anghie is conferred the Manley O. Hudson Medal by the American Society of International Law (ASIL) for his contributions to scholarship and achievement in international law.

=== March ===
- 3 March – Sri Lankan model Sandani Peiris is crowned as 2nd runner-up at the 29th "Top Model of the World 2023", held from 20 February to 3 March in Sharm El Sheikh, Egypt and was organized by the World Beauty Organization with the participation of 42 models.
- 6 March – Notorious Sri Lankan drug kingpin Nadun Chinthaka alias "Harak Kata" and his accomplice Salindu Malshika Gunaratne alias "Kudu Salindu" are arrested in Madagascar. They were brought to Sri Lanka on the 15th by a team of CID officers.
- 8 March – SriLankan Airlines "celebrate[s] the power of women" with an all-female crew aboard a flight to India in Flight UL131, in light of International Women's Day.
- 11 March – The quality of air in parts of Sri Lanka drops, with the air quality index (AQI) in Colombo reaching an "unhealthy" level of concern (numerical value between 151 and 200).
- 17 March
  - Criminal figure Ravindu Sanka de Silva alias "Booru Muna", accused of shooting a restaurant owner dead in Hanwella in 18 December 2022, is arrested in Avissawella.
  - Former MP J. Sri Ranga is arrested by the Police for coercing witnesses.

=== April ===
- 8 April
  - Professor Sunil Ariyaratne is appointed as the new chancellor of the University of the Visual and Performing Arts.
  - Ill-famed female drug dealer named "Yasorapura Dhammi" is arrested with 10g and 100 mg of heroin.
- 9 April – The engine compartment of the Samudradevi train, which ran from Galle to Maradana, is separated from the train in the Kalutara-North area and ran for a distance of nearly one kilometer.
- 10 April – The 2022 G.C.E Ordinary Level examinations which were scheduled to commence on 15 May are postponed by two weeks.
- 22 April – "Wasath Siriya – 2023", a Sinhala and Tamil New Year Festival is held at the Shangri-La Green premises in Colombo with the participation of President Ranil Wickremesinghe.
- 29 April – Notorious criminal figure Sinharage Saminda Silva alias 'Ratmalane Kudu Anju' is arrested in France.

=== May ===
- 3 May – The government shuts down 'Maga Neguma' and four of its affiliated institutions, due to lack of funds.
- 16 May – 2024 Sri Lankan presidential election: Leader of the Opposition Sajith Premadasa announces he will run for president in 2024.
- 17 May – The World Rugby Council suspends Sri Lanka Rugby from World Rugby membership with immediate effect due to concerns about the governance of Sri Lanka Rugby and a breach of the World Rugby Bye-Laws relating to political interference.
- 23 May
  - Kushani Rohanadeera assumes duties as the new Secretary General of the Parliament of Sri Lanka, following the resignation of her predecessor Dhammika Dasanayake.
  - ACMC parliamentarian Ali Sabri Raheem is arrested at the Bandaranaike International Airport (BIA) in Katunayake for smuggling a 3.5 kg stock of undeclared gold.
- 25 May – Sri Lankan sprinter Yupun Abeykoon wins second place in the Men's 100m finals at the 12th International Meeting "Citta' Di Savona" held in Italy, with a timing of 10.01 seconds (+2.7).
- 28 May – Stand-up comedian Nathasha Edirisooriya is arrested by the Criminal Investigation Department after making offensive statements about Buddhism, Islam and Christianity in a stand-up comedy segment. On 31 May, Bruno Divakara, owner of the YouTube channel 'SL-Vlogs', was also arrested for the same incident.
- 29 May
  - The G.C.E. Ordinary Level examinations 2022 (2023) commenced at 3,568 centres island-wide and with 472,553 candidates.
  - Ven. Rajangane Saddharathana Thero is arrested by police in Anuradhapura after making controversial statements which "could disrupt religious harmony."

=== June ===
- 1 June – The production, importation, selling and use of several plastic products is banned in Sri Lanka following a decision made by the Cabinet of Ministers earlier this year on 14 February. The ban includes single-use plastic straws and stirrers, single-use plastic plates, cups (except yoghurt cups), knives, spoons (including yoghurt spoons) and forks, plastic flower garlands and plastic string hopper trays. Meanwhile, government has made it mandatory to test imported dried fish, sprats and fruits for heavy metals as well.
- 4 June
  - Sri Lanka is unanimously elected as a vice president of the 78th session of the United Nations General Assembly which will assume the relevant position for the Asia Pacific region from September 2023 to September 2024.
  - Tharushi Dissanayaka wins a Silver medal and Jayeshi Uththara wins a Bronze medal at the 2023 Asian U20 Athletics Championships in 400 metres. The next day, Dissanayaka wins the Gold medal in the Women's 800m event with a time of 2:05.64, and Sri Lanka wins a Gold medal in the 4x400m Mixed Relay event with a time of 3:25.41 represented by Tharushi Karunarathna, Jayeshi Uththara, Vinod Ariyawansha and Shehan Dilranga. Malith Yasiru wins the Bronze medal in the Men's Triple Jump event.
  - A total of 31 students (16 second-year students and 15 from the third year) of the Faculty of Management and Business Studies of Jaffna University have been suspended owing to unruly behavior.
- 6 June – The Balapitiya High Court sentences a resident of the Korakeena area of Uragasmanhandiya to 110 years of rigorous imprisonment after being found guilty of serious sexual assault of his 11 year-old daughter on multiple occasions since 2008.
- 7 June – Parliamentarian Gajendrakumar Ponnambalam is arrested after accused of obstructing the duties of police officers.
- 11 June – Sri Lanka's triple jump national record holder Shreshan Dananjaya reportedly goes missing in Switzerland during an invitational athletics tournament held in Geneva, Switzerland.
- 13 June – Former Minister Navin Dissanayake is appointed as the new Governor of Sabaragamuwa Province after the resignation of his predecessor, Tikiri Kobbekaduwa.
- 15 June – The Asian Cricket Council (ACC) confirms the hybrid model for the 2023 Asia Cup, with Pakistan set to host four matches and the remaining nine games to be hosted in Sri Lanka.
- 19 June – Former Foreign Minister Rohitha Bogollagama is appointed as Sri Lanka's High Commissioner to the United Kingdom, with effect from 1 August 2023.
- 26 June – The Department of Wildlife Conservation cancels plans to export about 100,000 endangered toque macaque Old World monkeys to China after several environmentalists initiated legal action in the Court of Appeal against the export.
- 27 June – The Mahāvaṃsa is listed among the 64 new items of documentary heritage inscribed on the UNESCO's Memory of the World International Register in 2023.

=== July ===
- 1 July – The University of Peradeniya hosts an Open Day to commemorate the 80th anniversary of the university's establishment, where all nine of the university's faculties were open to the public.
- 2 July
  - Tusker 'Muthu Raja' is airlifted to Thailand by a special flight which left the Bandaranaike International Airport.
  - Sri Lanka qualifies for the 2023 Cricket World Cup in India after a nine wicket victory over Zimbabwe in the 2023 Cricket World Cup Qualifier.
- 4 July
  - Infamous 22-year-old burglar "Pothuvila Kaluwa", involved in several house robberies, is arrested with stolen items worth around Rs. 2 million.
  - Sri Lankan women's cricketer, Chamari Athapaththu ranked number 1 of the women's ODI batting rankings, becoming the first woman from Sri Lanka and second Sri Lankan overall after Sanath Jayasuriya to top the ODI rankings.
- 8 July – Ill-famed drug dealer Mahesh Madushanka Fernando, alias 'Molligoda Bhuthaya' is arrested by the Wadduwa Police with 7 grams and 200 milligrams of heroin.
- 9 July
  - Ten people are killed and 30 others are injured when a bus falls off a bridge into a river in the North Central Province.
  - Sri Lanka become champions of the ICC World Cup Qualifiers after beating the Netherlands by 128 runs in the final.
- 11 July – International Sri Lankan cricketer Wanindu Hasaranga claims the ICC Men's Player of the Month award for June 2023.
- 12 July – Gayanthika Abeyratne wins a Bronze medal in women's 1,500-metre event with a time of 04 minutes and 14.39 seconds and Nadeesha Lekamge wins the Bronze medals in the women's javelin throw with Sri Lankan record of 60.93 metres at the 25th Asian Athletics Championships. The next day, sprinter Nadeesha Ramanayake win the gold in the Women's 400m event with a time of 52.61 seconds. On 16 July, sprinter Tharushi Karunarathna wins a Gold medal in women's 800m event setting an Asian record and a national record with a time of 2:00:06. In the same event, Gayanthika Abeyratne wins the Bronze medal with a time of 2:03:25. Sri Lanka wins the Gold medal in the 400×4 Men's relay finals with a time of 3:01.56, competed by Aruna Darshana, Rajitha Neranjan, Kaushika Keshan and Kalinga Kumara. Meanwhile, the women's team also manages to bag the Silver medal for the 400×4 relay event with national record time of 3:33.27.
- 13 July – Sri Lankan para athlete Dulan Kodithuwakku wins the bronze medal in Men's Javelin Throw F46 event with distance of 64.06 meters at the 2023 World Para Athletics Championships.
- 18 July – The Working Committee of the Samagi Jana Balawegaya expels ministers Harin Fernando and Manusha Nanayakkara from the party for accepting ministerial portfolios in the Wickremesinghe-led cabinet a year earlier, contrary to the wishes of the SJB. Shortly afterwards, on 2 August, Fernando and Nanayakkara are readmitted into the United National Party by the party's working committee.
- 20 July – Chandani Wijewardena is appointed as Acting Presidential Secretary, the first time a woman has assumed the position in Sri Lanka.
- 29 July
  - President of France Emmanuel Macron visits Sri Lanka during a series of visits to the South Pacific Region. It is the first instance in history where a French president has visited the country.
  - The Ministry of Sports and Youth Affairs suspends the registration of the Sri Lanka Karate-Do Federation with a Special Gazette notification.

=== August ===
- 5 August – The luxury express train Yal Nila Odyssey commences operations from Mount Lavinia to Kankesanturai.
- 10 August – Ayomal Akalanka wins the Silver medal in the final of the Men's 400m Hurdles and Nilupul Pehesara wins the Bronze medal in the Men's High Jump event with 2.00m at the 7th Commonwealth Youth Games in Trinidad and Tobago.
- 15 August
  - The Government of Sri Lanka permits the importation of buses and trucks, lifting part of its vehicle import ban initiated in 2020 due to foreign exchange shortages, while bans on cars, motorcycles, and three-wheeled motor scooters persist pending improved foreign reserves.
  - Cricketer Wanindu Hasaranga announces his retirement from Test cricket with an intention to focus on limited-overs cricket.
- 20 August – B-Love Kandy become champions of 2023 Lanka Premier League after beating Dambulla Aura by 5 wickets in the final.
- 28 August – FIFA lifts the suspension imposed on the Football Sri Lanka with immediate effect.
- 29 August – 2024 Sri Lankan presidential election: The National People's Power announces NPP leader Anura Kumara Dissanayake as its presidential candidate for the 2024 elections.

=== September ===
- 2 September – The Jaffna, Mannar and Mullaitivu districts in the Northern Province are included to form Sri Lanka's 2nd Coconut Triangle. It was officially launched at a ceremony held at the Palai Coconut Model Garden in Jaffna in honour of World Coconut Day.
- 6 September – Former Sri Lankan cricketer Sachithra Senanayake is arrested over allegations of match-fixing, where he allegedly approached two cricketers participating in the first edition of the Lanka Premier League (LPL) in 2020 via phone calls from Dubai.
- 7 September – The Sri Lanka women's national cricket team records their first-ever series win against England in any format after historic 2-1 series win in Women T20I series.
- 8 September – The 8th Derana-Lux Film Awards is held at the Nelum Pokuna Theatre in Colombo.
- 13 September – Underworld figure and drug trafficker Sanjeewa Kumara alias 'Ganemulla Sanjeewa' is arrested at BIA.
- 14 September – Former parliamentarian Nishantha Muthuhettigamage is remanded until 21 September 2023 on the orders of the Galle Chief Magistrate following his arrest on charges of illegally assembling a jeep.
- 16 September – The drug trafficker infamously known as "Kevitiyagala Kaluwa" is arrested with 5 grams of heroin, crystal methamphetamine drugs and Kerala cannabis.
- 17 September – Freedom People's Alliance parliamentarian Uddika Premarathna narrowly escapes an assassination attempt at his residence in Anuradhapura. Unidentified gunmen opened fire at Premarathna as he was getting out from his car. Premarathna was unharmed in the incident.
- 25 September – The Sri Lanka women's cricket team wins the Silver medal at the 2022 Asian Games after a 19-run defeat to India.
- 28 September – Sri Lankan cricketer Danushka Gunathilaka is found not guilty of sexual intercourse without consent following an incidence occur through Tinder date in Sydney during 2022 ICC T20 World Cup.
- 30 September – A wildlife officer "mistakenly" shoots a tamed female elephant Sita, an elephant which participated in the annual Esala Perahera of Mahiyangana Raja Maha Vihara.

=== October ===
- 1 October
  - The 17 times national badminton champion Niluka Karunaratne officially announces his retirement from international competitive badminton representing Sri Lanka, who also had represented Sri Lanka at the Olympics in 2012, 2016 and 2020.
  - Sri Lanka Mixed 4x400m Relay team disqualifies over a lane infringement fault in the final at the 2023 Asian Games. The next day, Dilhani Lekamge wins a silver medal in the women's javelin throw with personal best throw of 61.57 metres, the first Athletics medal won by Sri Lanka in 17 years. Tharushi Karunarathna clinches the Gold medal in the Women's 800m event with a time of 2.03.20 minutes making the first athletics gold since 2002. Sri Lanka Women 4x400m Relay team wins a bronze medal in the Women's 4x400m relay event with a national record time of 3:30:88 minutes.
- 6 October
  - The Supreme Court of Sri Lanka unanimously makes a landmark decision in which it approved of the power of a political party to expel one of its members, thus ensuring their dismissal from Parliament. Such decision was made after former Minister of Environment Ahamed Nazeer Zainulabdeen was expelled from his party, the Sri Lanka Muslim Congress, for going against his party by accepting a ministerial position, thereby stripping him of both his seat and ministerial position.
  - Flooding and mudslides ravage the country as a result of heavy rainfall. In Colombo, five are killed and five others are injured after a large tree falls onto a moving bus. In the Galle District, one man dies after his house is impaled by a rock during a mudslide.
  - Astrologer Indika Thotawaththa is arrested over his statements damaging harmony among ethnic and religious groups.
- 11 October
  - All government schools in the Galle and Matara districts are reopened after closure between 5–6 October due to torrential rains and strong winds.
  - Seyed Ali Zahir Moulana of the Sri Lanka Muslim Congress (SLMC) is appointed as a Member of Parliament for the Batticaloa electoral district following the disqualification of former minister Ahamed Nazeer Zainulabdeen's parliamentary seat.
- 13 October – Sri Lankan women's cricketer Chamari Athapaththu is named as the ICC Women's Player of the Month for September 2023.
- 14 October – A project to plant ten million trees is launched by TV Derana in commemoration of the channel's 18th anniversary.
- 15 October – The Grade 05 Scholarship Examination commences at 2,888 exam centers with a total of 337,956 candidates.
- 16 October – The Neurosurgery Unit of Anuradhapura Teaching Hospital successfully carries out an awake brain surgery for the resection of a brain tumor, where the patient managed to draw a picture during the operation.
- 17 October – A woman from Ragama gives birth to sextuplets at the Castle Street Hospital for Women (CSHW) in Colombo.
- 23 October – Following the dismissal of Ahamed Nazeer Zainulabdeen, Keheliya Rambukwella is sworn in as the new Minister of Environment, Mahinda Amaraweera is sworn in as Minister of Agriculture and Plantation Industries and Dr. Ramesh Pathirana is sworn in as the new Minister of Health in a cabinet reshuffle.
- 24 October – Sri Lanka para athlete Nuwan Indika wins a Gold medal in the Men's 100m (T44) event with a timing of 11.63 seconds at the 2022 Asian Para Games. Meanwhile, Para-athlete Pradeep Somasiri wins another Gold medal in the Men's 1500m (T46) event with a timing of 4:05.14 minutes.

=== November ===
- 1 November – The 15th Population and Housing Census conducted every ten years commences at the Presidential Secretariat in Colombo.
- 3 November – Sri Lanka Cricket calls for an urgent and comprehensive explanation from the entire coaching staff and selectors after Sri Lanka suffers 302-run loss to India in the 2023 Cricket World Cup. The next day, sports minister Roshan Ranasinghe asks the Executive Committee of Sri Lanka Cricket and the Selection Committee to step down from their positions immediately. Subsequently, Mohan de Silva, secretary of Sri Lanka Cricket made his resignation.
- 4 November – The World Rugby Council lifts the temporary ban imposed on Sri Lanka Rugby.
- 6 November
  - Sports Minister Roshan Ranasinghe appoints a seven-member Interim Committee for Sri Lanka Cricket led by Arjuna Ranatunga. However, President Ranil Wickremesinghe was not informed about the appointment beforehand. As a result, Ranasinghe called off the Interim Committee the next day.
  - During the ODI world cup match against Bangladesh, Sri Lankan cricketer Angelo Mathews becomes the first cricketer to be "timed out" in international cricket.
- 7 November – The All Ceylon Makkal Congress revokes the party membership of MP Ali Sabri Raheem, after being detained for smuggling gold and mobile phones earlier this year on 23 May.
- 10 November – The International Cricket Council suspends Sri Lanka from international cricket due to government interference in the country's cricket activities.
- 13 November – Former Sri Lankan cricketer Aravinda de Silva is inducted into the ICC Cricket Hall of Fame as the Class of 2023.
- 16 November – Sri Lanka is elected to the executive board of the United Nations Educational, Scientific and Cultural Organization (UNESCO) for the term 2023–2027.
- 20 November – Israeli-Palestinian vlogger and online influencer Nuseir Yassin aka "Nas Daily" makes an agreement with the Sri Lanka Tourism Promotion Bureau, where he signed to produce three special videos about Sri Lanka.
- 21 November – Following the suspension of Sri Lanka Cricket by the ICC, hosting rights for the 2024 Under-19 Cricket World Cup were shifted from Sri Lanka to South Africa.
- 27 November – Cabinet minister Roshan Ranasinghe is stripped of all his ministerial portfolios by President Ranil Wickremesinghe. In a cabinet reshuffle, Harin Fernando is sworn in as the new Minister of Sports and Youth Affairs and Pavithra Wanniarachchi is sworn in as the new Minister of Irrigation.

=== December ===
- 2 December – University students of about 180 are rescued after they were left stranded in the Hanthana mountain range during a hike.
- 4 December
  - Cyclone Michaung intensifies and thundershowers occur in the Western, Sabaragamuwa, Northern, Southern and North Western provinces.
  - SriLankan Airlines introduces double daily flights between Colombo and Mumbai for the first time.
  - New Minister of Sports Harin Fernando appoints a new Selection Committee for Sri Lanka Cricket headed by former international cricketer Upul Tharanga. On 11 December, Fernando appoints the other members of the Selection Committee, including former internationals Dilruwan Perera, Tharanga Paranavithana, Ajantha Mendis and Indika de Saram.
- 5 December – Sri Lanka issues its first-ever digitized national birth certificate, with a barcode under the e-population documentation program.
- 7 December
  - Russo-Ukrainian War: Three Sri Lankans attached to the International Legion for the Defence of Ukraine are killed on the battlefield in a Russian artillery attack on Ukraine, where the body of Captain Ranish Hewage, a former Sri Lanka Army officer was recovered. Meanwhile, the bodies of M.M. Priyantha, a former petty officer of Sri Lanka Navy and Rodney Jayasinghe, a former member of the Sri Lanka Sinha Regiment, were not recovered.
  - A woman infamously known as "Kudu Dhanu" is arrested with more than 1 kilogram of crystal methamphetamine in possession.
- 8 December – Pope Francis appoints Rev. Arachchige Don Wimal Siri Appuhamy Jayasuriya as the new Bishop of Chilaw.
- 9 December
  - 2023 Sri Lankan blackouts: A nationwide power outage occurs in Sri Lanka due to a system failure.
  - Thenura Dilruk Wickramaratna wins silver at the 20th International Junior Science Olympiad (IJSO), becoming the first Sri Lankan to win two Silver Medals at the IJSO.
- 12 December – 29-year old Amritha Shvethambari Vidyapathy wins a gold medal in Kathak dancing, becoming the only Sri Lankan and international student to win one at Bhatkhande Sanskriti Vishwavidyalaya for this year.
- 14 December – Sri Lanka Cricket appoints former international cricket captain Sanath Jayasuriya as a Cricket Consultant to oversee all teams that attend the SLC’s High Performance Centre.
- 15 December – The National Convention of the Sri Lanka Podujana Peramuna (SLPP) commences. Former president Mahinda Rajapaksa is reappointed as the party leader.
- 18 December – Janaka Chandragupta, former Secretary of Health Ministry, is arrested by the CID over the controversial human Immunoglobulin import issue.
- 24 December – Operation Yukthiya: Sri Lanka Police announce the arrests of 14,766 people during a week-long military-backed drug crackdown, leading to the seizure of nearly 440 kilograms (970 lb) of narcotics.
- 25 December – Underworld figure Don Indika alias ‘Manna Roshan’ and his accomplice are killed during a clash between two rival underworld gangs.

== Deaths ==
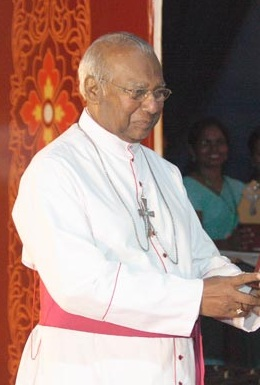
Oswald Gomis (b. 1932)

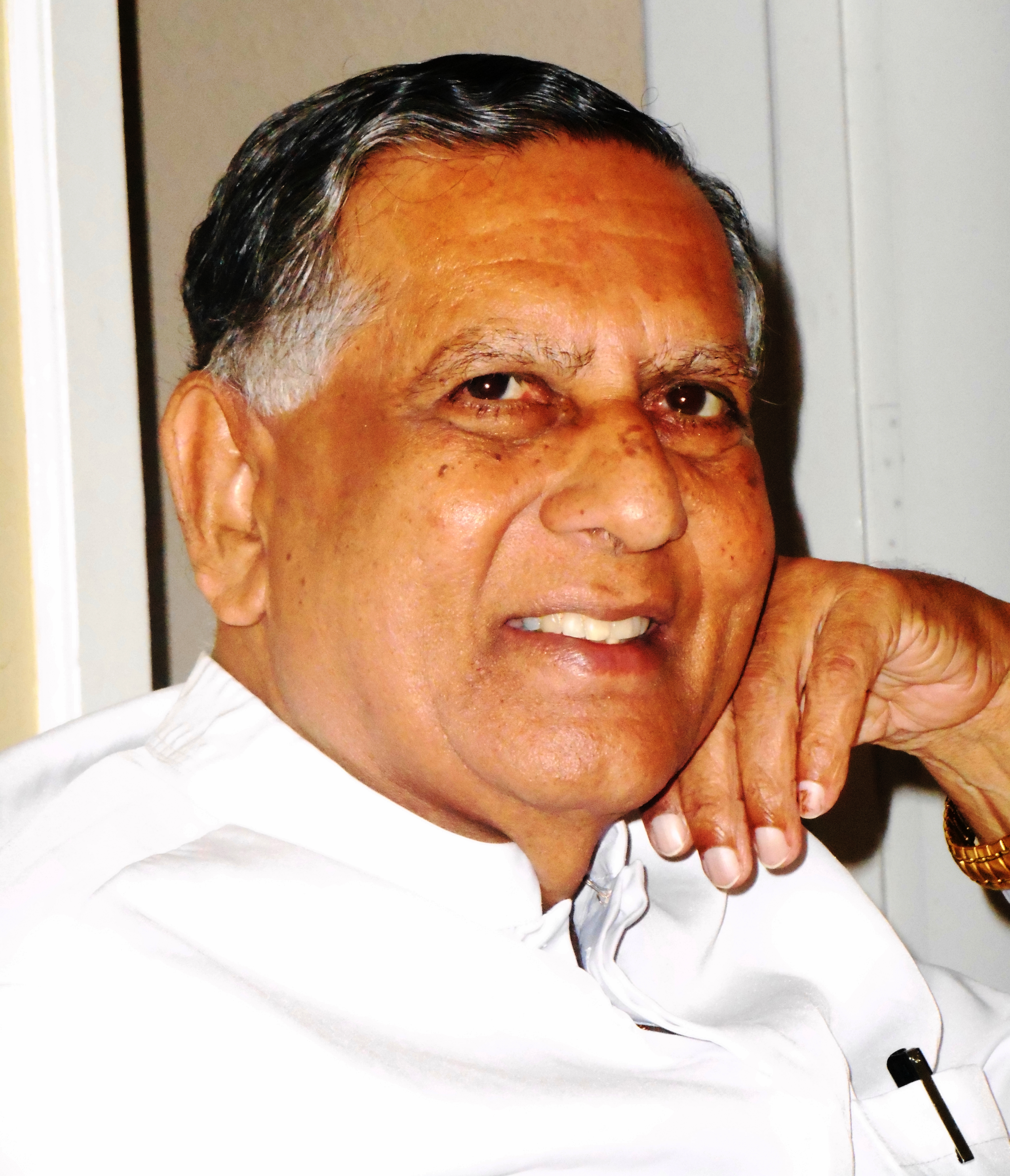
Joseph Michael Perera (b. 1941)

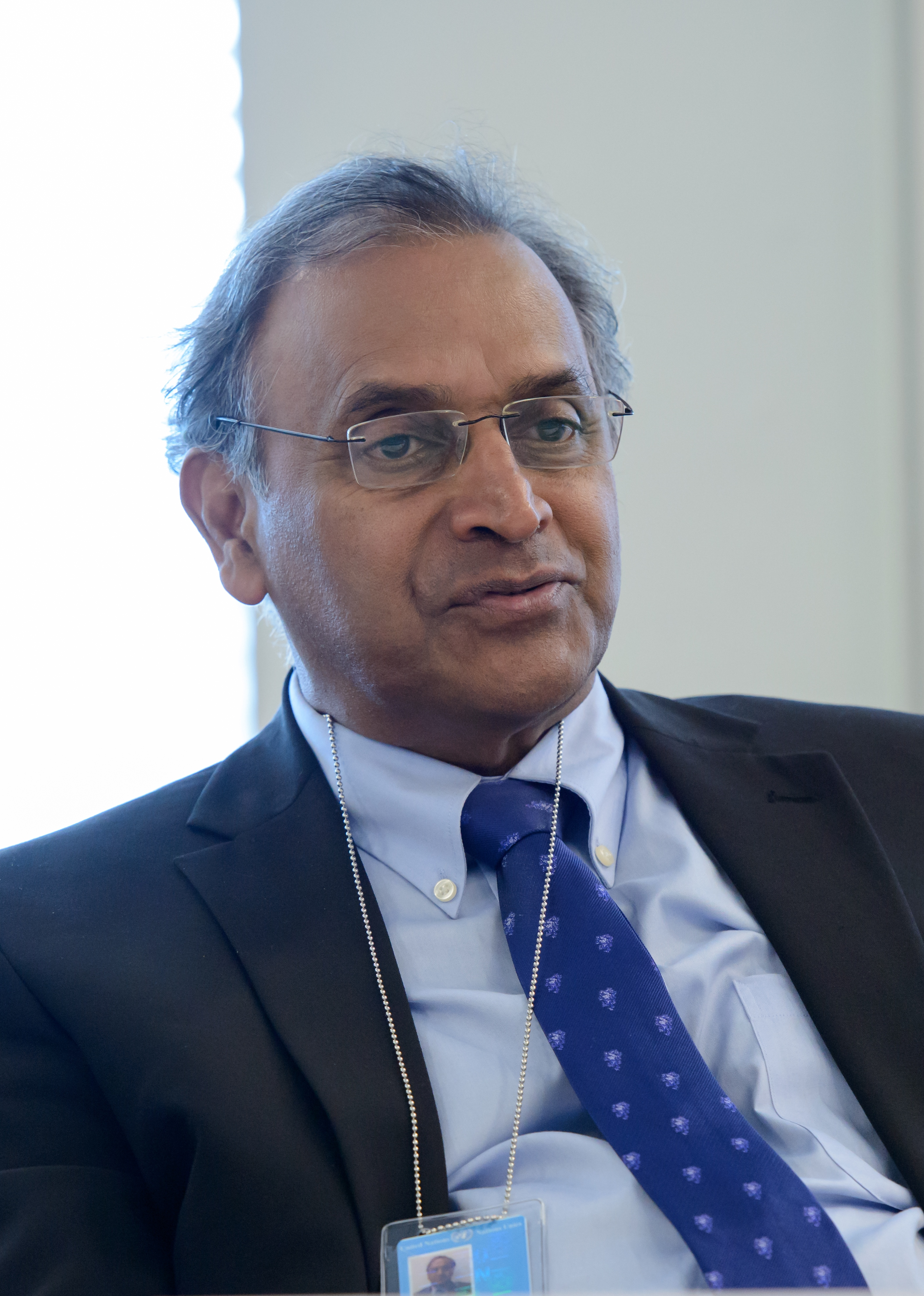
Jayantha Dhanapala (b. 1938)

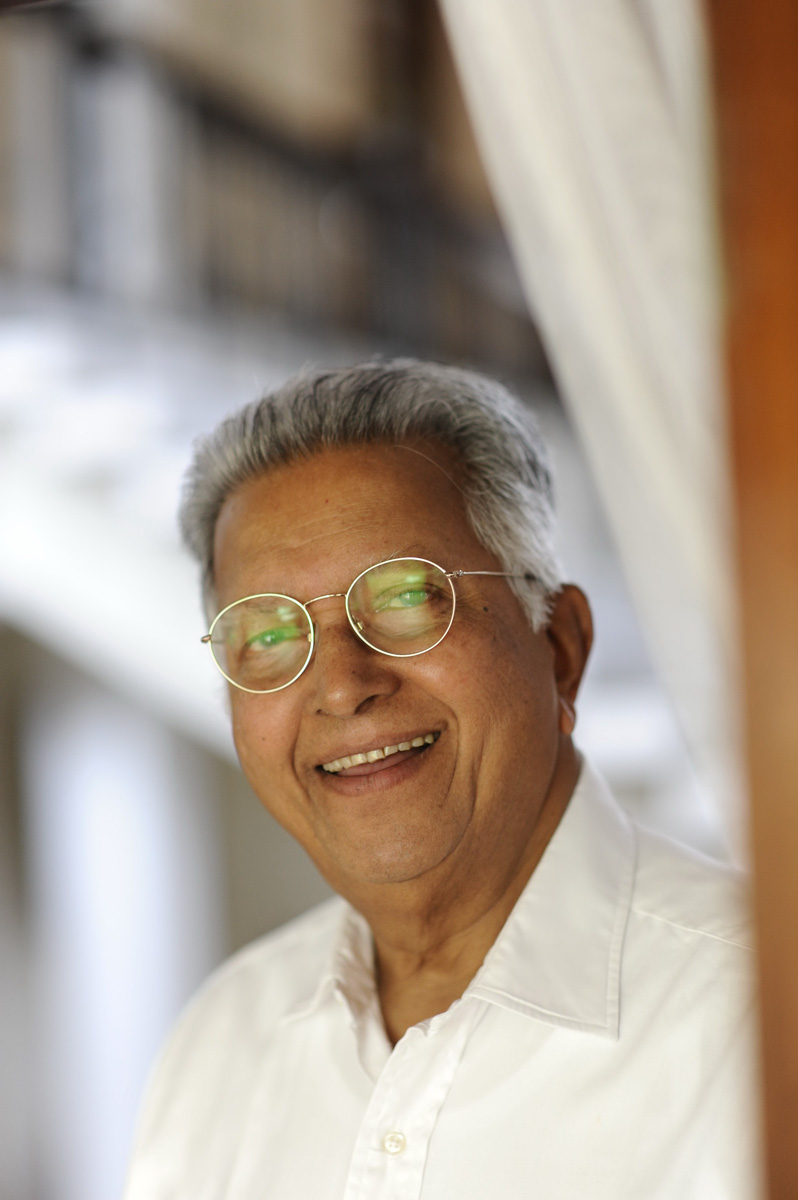
Merrill J. Fernando (b. 1930)

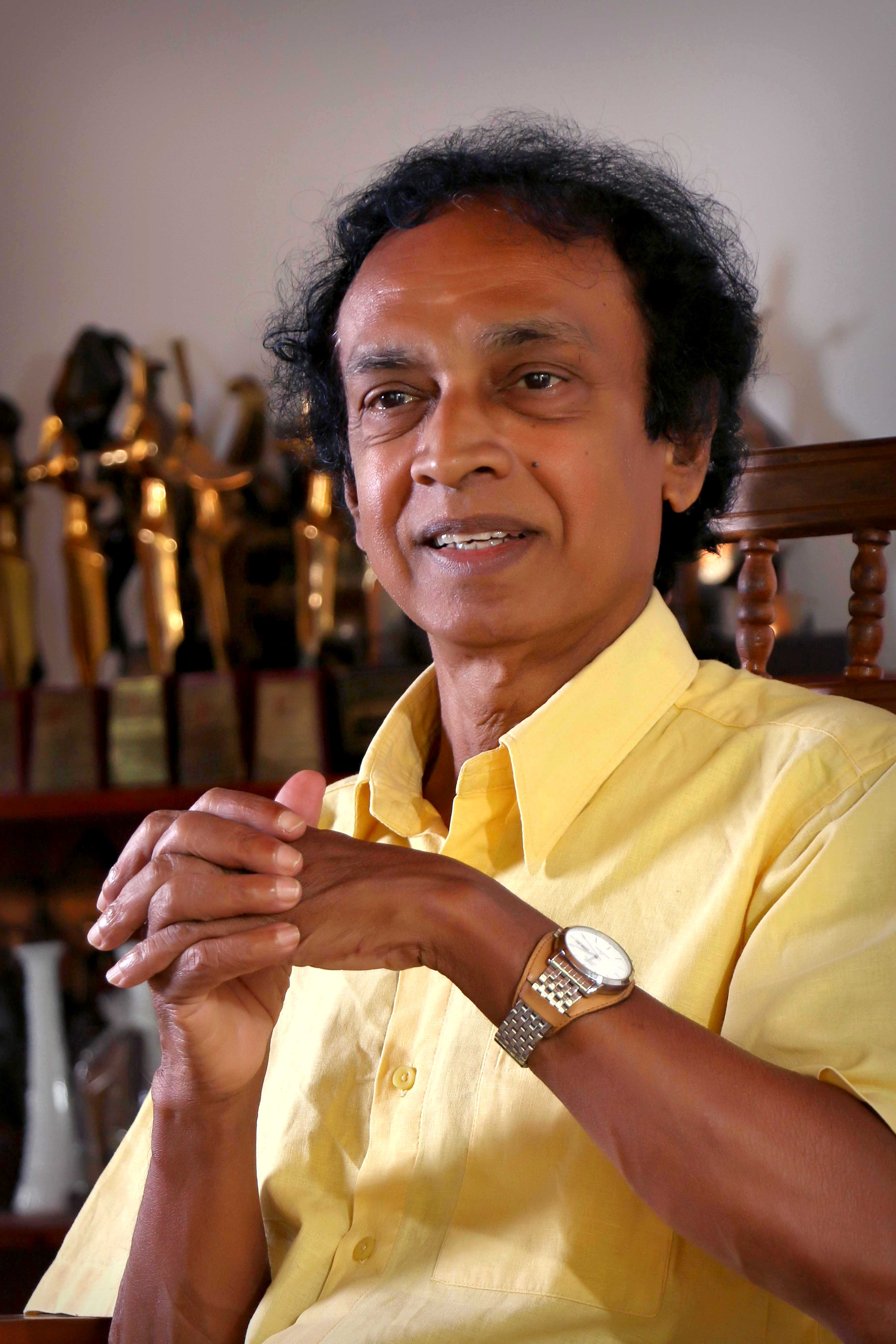
Suminda Sirisena (b. 1948)

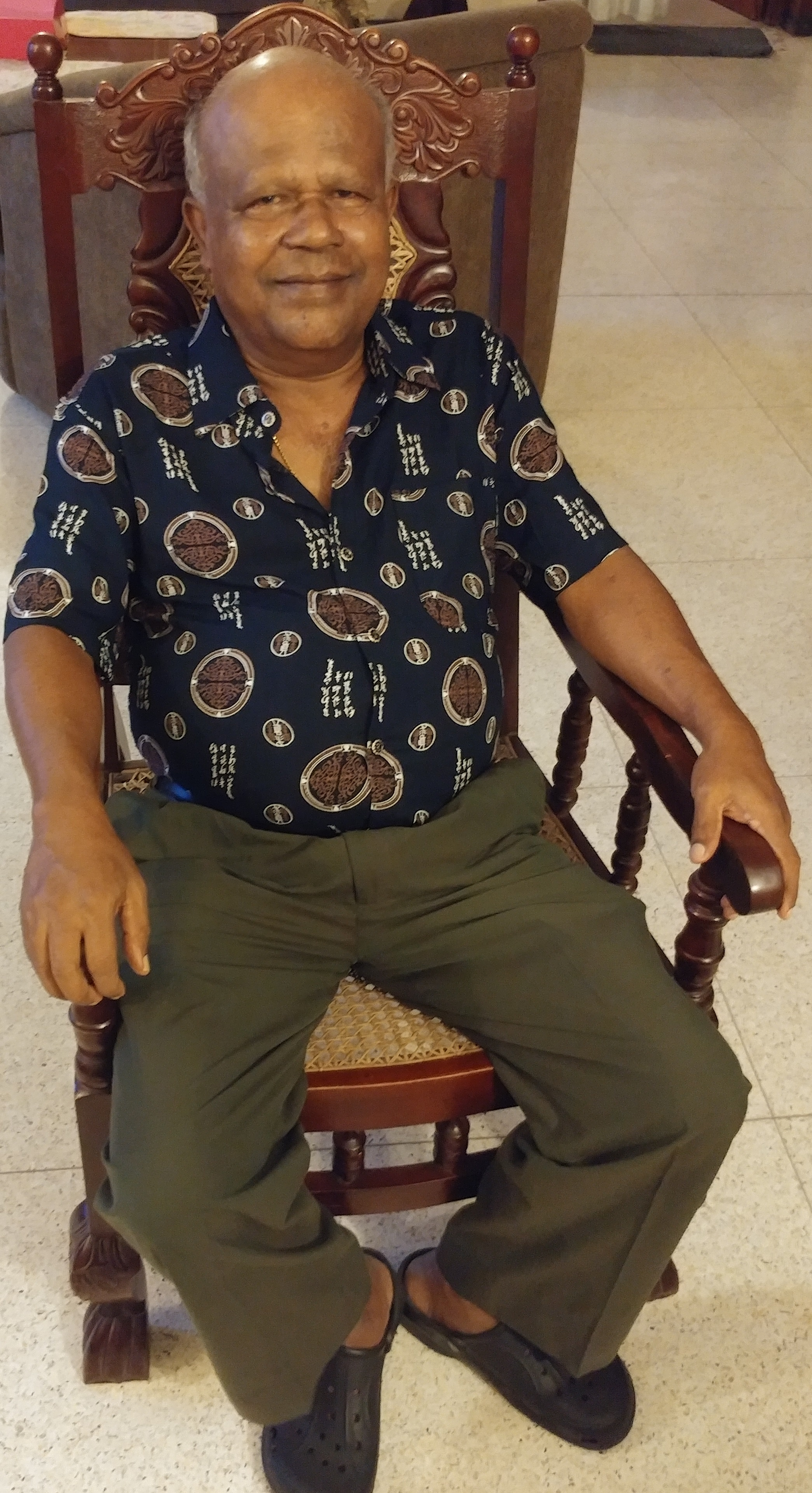
Camillus Perera (b. 1939)

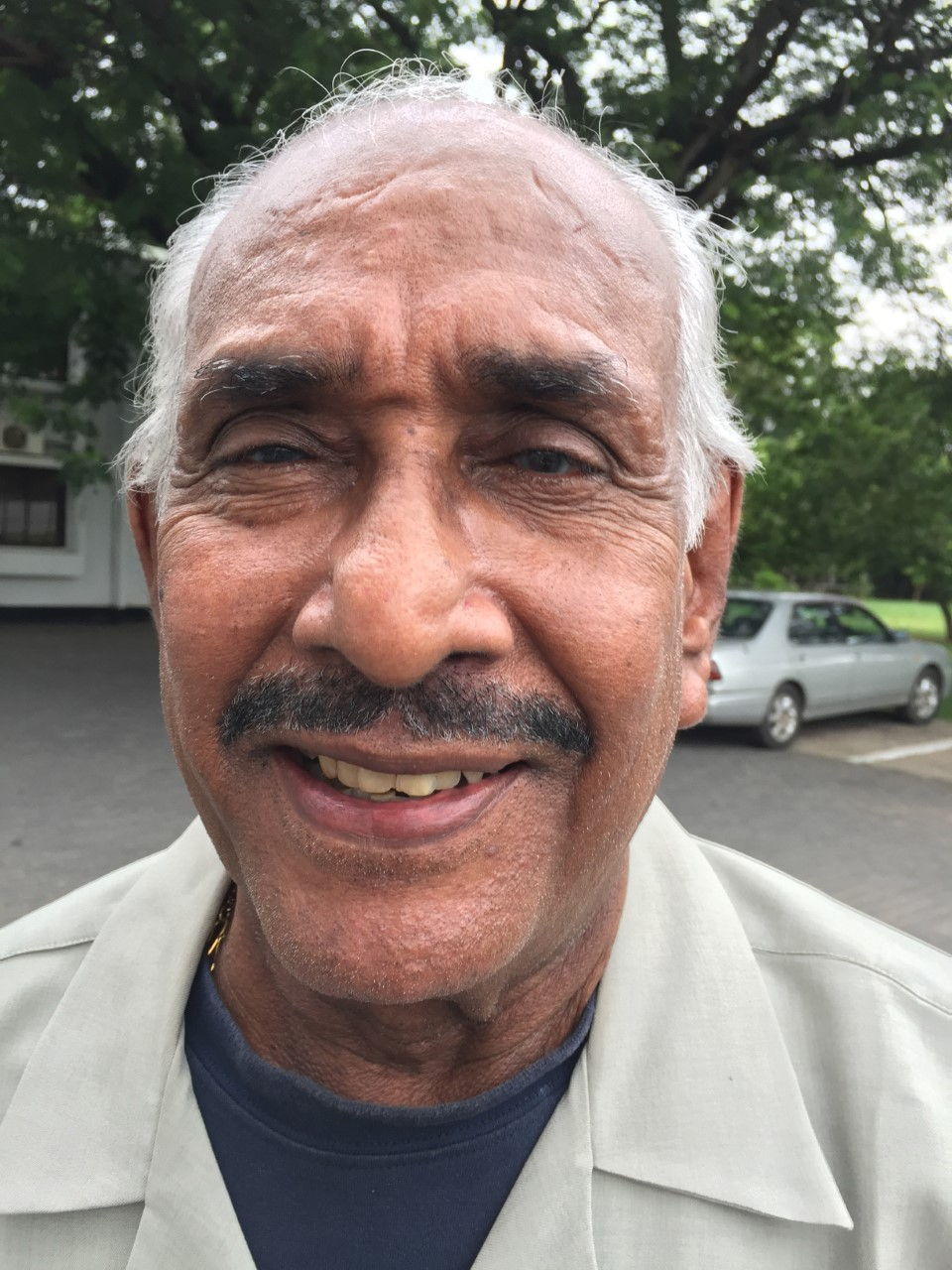
Rex Kodippili (b. 1938)

=== January ===
- 5 January – Buddhi Wickrama, 83, actor
- 13 January
  - Reginald Cooray, 75, politician
  - Don Sumathipala, murderer
- 19 January – Sumitra Peries, 88, filmmaker
- 29 January
  - George Beven, 93, Sri Lankan-British artist
  - K.B. Herath, 81, dramatist

=== February ===
- 2 February – Tissa Dias, 64, lyricist
- 3 February – Oswald Gomis, 90, Roman Catholic prelate and academic administrator, auxiliary bishop (1968–1996) and archbishop of Colombo (2002–2009), chancellor of the University of Colombo (2002–2021)
- 27 February - Royston Ellis, 82, English-born novelist and travel writer

=== March ===
- 5 March – Heen Banda Dissanayaka, 85, civil servant, governor of the Central Bank of Ceylon (1992–1995)
- 8 March – Punyakanti Wijenayake, 90, author
- 23 March – Hector Ekanayake, 84, stuntman
- 24 March
  - Gamini Wanaguru, actor
  - Jayathilaka Herath, 71, actor
- 28 March
  - Sanath Nandasiri, 81, singer, musician and composer, chancellor of the University of the Visual and Performing Arts in Sri Lanka (2016–2023)
  - Joseph Michael Perera, 81, politician, MP (1976–2010) and Speaker (2001–2004) of the Parliament
- 31 March – Mahinda Thilakaratne, 79, musician

=== April ===
- 1 April – Amarasiri Kalansuriya, 82, actor
- 7 April – Priyani Soysa, 97, paediatrician
- 18 April – Mahesh Nishantha, cinematographer
- 20 April – Louis Vandestraaten, 77, filmmaker
- 27 April – D. B. Warnasiri, 83, journalist

=== May ===
- 1 May
  - G. R. Perera, 83, actor
  - Vijaya Jayawardena, 67, actor
- 4 May – Gnananga Gunawardena, 78, actor
- 16 May
  - Padmini Dahanayake, 81, dancer
  - Most Ven. Dodampahala Chandrasiri Mahanayake Thero, 84, Buddhist monk
- 17 May – Tony Hassan, 73, singer
- 18 May – Christopher Paul, 87, singer
- 21 May – Lucy Page Khadin, 100, film producer
- 27 May – Jayantha Dhanapala, 84, diplomat

=== June ===
- 7 June – Shyaman Jayasinghe, 78, theatre actor
- 21 June – Sunil Tillakaratne, 52, theatre actor

=== July ===
- 1 July – Gaya Ramya Alwis, 52, director
- 8 July – Kanthi Gunatunga, 86, film actress
- 20 July – Ahamad Hasan Mohamad Alavi, 71, politician, MP (1994–1999)
- 20 July – Merrill J. Fernando, 93, tea industry executive, founder of Dilmah
- 24 July – Amal Sandaratne, 47, economist

=== August ===
- 1 August – Lal Sarath Kumara, 69, actor
- 9 August – Daya Sahabandu, 83, cricketer
- 11 August – Anula de Silva, 82, author
- 12 August – Allan Smith, 94, Olympic diver
- 15 August – Justin Belagamage, 78, producer

=== September ===
- 5 September – Seetha Nanayakkara, 85, film actress
- 18 September – Ramya Sriyani Pathirana, 64, radio artist
- 19 September – M.S. Aliman, 77, film editor
- 21 September – H.A. Seneviratne, 83, literate
- 26 September – Jayantha Paranathala, 72, cricketer and police officer

=== October ===
- 9 October – Jackson Anthony, 65, actor
- 13 October – Thilak Godamanne, 80, businessman and film producer
- 16 October – Victor Perera, 75, police officer, politician, inspector general of police (2006–2008) and governor of the Northern Province (2008)
- 17 October – Buddhi Keerthisena, 83, film producer
- 19 October – Summa Navaratnam, 98, athlete and rugby player
- 21 October
  - Lalith Kotelawala, 84, businessman, founder of Seylan Bank and chairman of Ceylinco Consolidated (1968–2008)
  - Rajini Selvanayagam, 87, dancer
- 22 October
  - Nishantha Perera, 49, astrologer
  - Premasiri Hewawasam, 64, beautician
- 26 October – Lionel Balagalle, 75, military officer, commander of the army (2000–2003) and chief of staff (1999–2000)
- 27 October – Clarice de Silva, 80, film actress
- 28 October – Sunil Siriwardena, 82, musician
- 30 October – Percy Abeysekera, 87, cricket superfan

=== November ===
- 1 November – Sepalica Rooks Varia Scotilda Rooks, 82, film actress
- 6 November – Athula Sri Gamage, 60, singer
- 11 November – Gamini Weerakoon, journalist, editor

=== December ===
- 1 December
  - Ananda Gamage, 73, musician
  - Leena de Silva, 87, actress
  - Most Ven. Mataramba Hemarathana Thero, 83, Buddhist monk
- 4 December – Suminda Sirisena, 75, actor
- 17 December
  - Camillus Perera, 84, cartoonist
  - Lionel Wickrama, 77, actor
- 22 December – M. N. Abdul Majeed, 66, politician, MP (1994–2010)
- 24 December – Rex Kodippili, 85, actor
- 26 December – Udula Dabare, 87, actress
- 27 December – Martin Jayawardene, 98, poet
- 28 December
  - Nandasena Sooriyarachchi, 78, journalist
  - Harith Gunawardena, 55, journalist
