= 2022 in Sri Lanka =

- Decades: 2000s; 2010s; 2020s
- See also: Other events of 2022; Timeline of Sri Lankan history

The following lists notable events that took place during the year 2022 in Sri Lanka.

== Incumbents ==
=== National ===
President	Prime Minister	Speaker	Chief Justice	Opposition Leader
Ranil Wickremesinghe (Age 73)	Dinesh Gunawardena (Age 73)	Mahinda Yapa Abeywardena (Age 77)	Jayantha Jayasuriya	Sajith Premadasa (Age 55)
United National Party (from 21 July 2022)	Sri Lanka Podujana Peramuna (from 22 July 2022)	Sri Lanka Podujana Peramuna (since 20 August 2020)	Independent (since 29 April 2019)	Samagi Jana Balawegaya (since 3 January 2020)

Former

President	Prime Minister	Prime Minister
Gotabaya Rajapaksa (Age 73)	Mahinda Rajapaksa (Age 77)	Ranil Wickremesinghe (Age 73)
Sri Lanka Podujana Peramuna (18 November 2019 − 15 July 2022)	Sri Lanka Podujana Peramuna (21 November 2019 – 9 May 2022)	United National Party (12 May – 21 July 2022)

=== Provincial ===
Governors

- Central Province – Lalith U Gamage
- Eastern Province – Anuradha Yahampath
- North Central Province – Maheepala Herath
- Northern Province – Jeevan Thiagarajah
- North Western Province – Wasantha Karannagoda
- Sabaragamuwa Province – Tikiri Kobbekaduwa
- Southern Province – Willy Gamage
- Uva Province – A. J. M. Muzammil
- Western Province – Roshan Goonatilake

Chief Ministers

- Central Province – Vacant
- Eastern Province – Vacant
- North Central Province – Vacant
- Northern Province – Vacant
- North Western Province – Vacant
- Sabaragamuwa Province – Vacant
- Southern Province – Vacant
- Uva Province – Vacant
- Western Province – Vacant

== Events ==
- COVID-19 pandemic in Sri Lanka
- 2019–present Sri Lankan economic crisis
  - 2022 Sri Lankan protests
  - 2022 Sri Lankan political crisis
  - Exile of Gotabaya Rajapaksa
- 2022–2023 mpox outbreak in Asia

== Events by month ==
=== January ===
- 2 January − The total number of deaths from COVID-19 in Sri Lanka surpasses 15,000 with 24 more deaths.
- 4 January − Former Sri Lankan cricketer and current Sri Lanka women's cricket team head coach Hashan Tillakaratne tests positive for COVID-19.
- 5 January − International cricketer Bhanuka Rajapaksa retires from international cricket after a three-year career at the age of 30. However, on 13 January 2022, he withdrew his retirement following a request from sports minister.
- 8 January − International cricketer Danushka Gunathilaka retires from Test match cricket.
- 9 January − International cricketer Avishka Fernando tests positive for COVID-19.
- 11 January − A hand grenade is recovered from the premises of All Saints' Church, Borella. On 13 January, the main suspect involved in setting up the hand grenade inside the church was identified as a 56-year-old who was associated with the church for nearly 16 years.
- 12 January
  - The construction work of the second phase of Eastern Container Terminal, spread over an area of 75 hectares is 1,320 meters long at the Colombo Port, is inaugurated.
  - The Colombo High Court Trial-at-Bar sentences former Prisons Commissioner Emil Ranjan Lamahewa to death for his crimes committed during the 2012 Welikada prison riot, while also acquitting the first defendant in the case, former Inspector of Police (IP) Neomal Rangajeewa from all charges in the case.
- 15 January − The Ethugalpura Gateway, the second phase of the Central Expressway from Mirigama to Kurunegala is declared open for the general public.
- 17 January − General Secretary of the Tamil United Liberation Front (TULF) and former parliamentarian V. Anandasangaree tests positive for COVID-19.
- 18 January − The female lion cub named 'Dora', born on 26 July 2021 at the Ridiyagama Safari Park, makes her public debut. She is the first lion cub to be born to the lioness 'Lara' at the Ridiyagama Safari Park.
- 19 January − A power generator that supplied 150 megawatts at the Kelanitissa Power Station was temporarily shut down due to the lack of fuel. Later that day, all operations at the Kelanitissa Power Station, which generated 300 MW of electricity, were halted completely.
- 20 January
  - Minister of Public Security and retired Rear Admiral Sarath Weerasekara and Tamil National Alliance (TNA) parliamentarian Shanakiya Rasamanickam test positive for COVID-19.
  - Sri Lankan leg-spinner Wanindu Hasaranga is included in both ICC Men's T20I and ODI teams of the year 2021 whereas skipper Dimuth Karunaratne is included in the ICC Men's Test team and pace bowler Dushmantha Chameera is selected for the ICC Men's ODI team.
- 21 January − The total number of COVID-19 cases in Sri Lanka surpasses 600,000.
- 22 January
  - The 2021 (2022) Grade 5 Scholarship Examinations are held at 2,943 centres from 9.30 a.m. to 12.15 p.m. with a total of 340,508 candidates.
  - Sri Lanka Podujana Peramuna (SLPP) parliamentarians Sarathi Dushmantha and Nalaka Kottegoda test positive for COVID-19.
- 24 January
  - Sri Lanka women's national cricket team qualifies for the 2022 Commonwealth Games after they beat Bangladesh Women by 22 runs at the final of Commonwealth Games Women's Cricket Competition Qualifiers in Kuala Lumpur, Malaysia.
  - Samagi Jana Balawegaya parliamentarian Rohini Kumari Wijerathna tests positive for COVID-19.
- 25 January − State Ministers Jayantha Samaraweera and Dilum Amunugama, as well as MP Amarakeerthi Athukorala and his wife, all test positive for COVID-19.
- 26 January − Sri Lankan international cricketer Dilruwan Perera announces his retirement from international cricket after a 14-year career.
- 28 January − Laboratory tests confirm that 95% of the new COVID-19 cases reported in Sri Lanka were caused by the Omicron variant.
- 29 January
  - Speaker of the Parliament of Sri Lanka Mahinda Yapa Abeywardena tests positive for COVID-19.
  - A 40-year-old Sri Lankan father Indika Gunathilaka murders his four-year-old daughter, Lily, and six-year-old son, Kohan, before hanging himself in the garage of their home on Essington Street, in the southeast Perth suburb of Huntingdale.
- 31 January − International cricketer Chamika Karunaratne, first-class cricketer Nuwan Thushara, interim head coach Rumesh Ratnayake and trainer Dilshan Fonseka all test positive for COVID-19.

=== February ===
- 2 February
  - A group of outsiders attack the hostel of the Kelaniya University's Faculty of Medicine in Ragama, where three students whom were injured were admitted to the Colombo North Teaching Hospital in Ragama. The following day, Avinda Randila Jehan Fernando, son of State Minister Arundika Fernando, was arrested over the assault after he surrendered to the police. Fernando resigned from his ministerial position after the arrest of his son.
  - The total number of COVID-19 deaths in Sri Lanka surpasses 15,500 with 23 more deaths.
- 3 February
  - Minister of Environment Mahinda Amaraweera tests positive for COVID-19.
  - Sri Lanka receives its first-ever Geographical indication (GI) certification after the European Union (EU) Commission grants GI status to Ceylon cinnamon.
- 6 February − Samagi Jana Balawegaya parliamentarian Harshana Rajakaruna tests positive for COVID-19.
- 7 February − The 2021 (2022) G.C.E. Advanced Level Examinations commence at 2,438 centers island-wide with a total of 345,242 candidates.
- 8 February − Sri Lanka Podujana Peramuna parliamentarian Dilan Perera and international cricketer Kusal Mendis test positive for COVID-19.
- 9 February − Attorney-at-Law Hejaaz Hizbullah, who was held in custody under the Prevention of Terrorism Act (PTA), returns home after nearly two years.
- 11 February
  - A large-scale drug peddler identified as Dulan Sameera Sampath alias "Abba" dies in a shootout with the Police Special Task Force (STF) in the area of Egoda Uyana, Moratuwa.
  - The University of Vavuniya is declared open as the 17th State University of Sri Lanka, under the patronage of President Gotabaya Rajapaksa.
- 12 February − International cricketer Binura Fernando tests positive for COVID-19 during the Australian cricket tour.
- 14 February − A group of individuals reportedly attacked the residence of senior journalist Chamuditha Samarawickrama at Wewala, Piliyandala where several windows had been shattered and feces had been thrown at the house as well.
- 15 February
  - International cricketer Wanindu Hasaranga contracts COVID-19 during the Australian cricket tour.
  - A drug dealer named Manawaduge Asanka Maduranga alias "Parippuwa" is arrested by the Police Special Task Force during a raid carried out in the area of Konkadawala.
- 18 February
  - Former Defence Secretary Hemasiri Fernando and Former Inspector-General of Police (IGP) Pujith Jayasundara, who were accused of criminal negligence of duty by failing to prevent the 2019 Easter Sunday terror attacks despite receiving intelligence information in advance, are acquitted of the charges laid on them.
  - Sri Lanka Podujana Peramuna (SLPP) Member of Parliament Akila Ellawala tests positive for COVID-19.
- 20 February − The total number of COVID-19 deaths in Sri Lanka surpasses 16,000 with 30 more deaths.
- 22 February − Vice chairman of the Sri Lanka Freedom Party (SLFP) Jeewan Kumaranatunga steps down from all positions he held in the party and expects to join the New Lanka Freedom Party under the leadership of Kumara Welgama.

=== March ===
- 3 March – Minister of Industries Wimal Weerawansa and Minister of Energy Udaya Gammanpila are removed from their Ministerial Portfolios.
- 7 March – Sri Lanka's largest cement factory, the facility of Lanwa Sanstha Cement Corporation (Pvt) Ltd. is declared open in the Magampura Lanka Industrial Zone, Hambantota.
- 25 March – Former Minister Pandu Bandaranaike is arrested while attempting to sell three elephant pearls for Rs. 10 million.
- 28 March – The fifth Bay of Bengal Initiative for Multi-Sectoral Technical and Economic Cooperation (BIMSTEC) Summit, hosted by the Government of Sri Lanka, begins in Colombo.
- 31 March – 2022 Sri Lankan protests: Hundreds of protesters storm the residence of President Gotabaya Rajapaksa in Mirihana to protest against the government's poor handling of the economy, leading to shortages of fuel and power cuts that had reached over 12-hours a day.

=== April ===
- 1 April – 2022 Sri Lankan protests: President Gotabaya Rajapaksa declares a State of Emergency in Sri Lanka, in effect from 1 April 2022.
- 2 April – 2022 Sri Lankan protests: A 36-hour island-wide curfew is imposed at 6:00pm, and lasted until 6:00am on Monday, 4 April, to avoid further protests.
- 3 April – 2022 Sri Lankan political crisis: All 26 cabinet ministers resign en masse except for Prime Minister Mahinda Rajapaksa.
- 4 April – 2022 Sri Lankan political crisis: A new 4-member cabinet is appointed following the resignation of the previous cabinet of ministers.
  - Minister of External Affairs : G. L. Peiris
  - Minister of Finance : Ali Sabry
  - Minister of Education : Dinesh Gunawardena
  - Minister of Highways : Johnston Fernando
- 7 April – Nandalal Weerasinghe is appointed as the new Governor of the Central Bank of Sri Lanka.
- 8 April – The Sri Lanka Navy apprehends 2 suspects with nearly 956 grams of crystal methamphetamine called "ice" and a dinghy during a patrol in seas north of Talaimannar, believed to be worth over Rs. 7.6 million. Later, the navy personnel apprehends more 3 suspects with around 1 kg of "ice" in seas off the Delft Island which was worth approximately Rs. 8 million.
- 9 April – 2022 Sri Lankan protests: Tens of thousands of anti-government protestors occupy Galle Face Green in Colombo, in one of the largest street protests in the country's history, and rename the protesting area as "Gotagogama".
- 11 April
  - Many leading licensed commercial banks in Sri Lanka declare their selling rate of the US Dollar at Rs. 330 and the buying price of the dollar at Rs. 320.
  - Sri Lankan actor Hiran Abeysekera wins the award for Best Actor at the Laurence Olivier Awards, held at the Royal Albert Hall in London, for his performance as the main protagonist in the Wes-End play 'Life of Pi'.
- 12 April – The Asia Rugby Executive Committee (EXCO) decides to impose a temporary membership suspension on Sri Lanka Rugby with immediate effect, upon receiving contrary letters from Sri Lanka's Ministry of Sports and the National Olympic Committee of Sri Lanka casting serious doubt over the legitimate body to administer the sport.
- 14 April – Fitch Ratings downgrades Sri Lanka's Long-Term Foreign-Currency Issuer Default Rating (IDR) from 'CC' to 'C'.
- 15 April
  - Theshara Jayasinghe steps down from his position as the chairman of Litro Gas Lanka Limited. Later on 21 April, Vijitha Herath is appointed as his replacement. Herath would later resigned from the post on 10 June, and Muditha Peiris would be appointed as his replacement on 13 June.
  - Former Finance Minister Basil Rajapaksa tests positive for COVID-19.
- 18 April – 2022 Sri Lankan political crisis: A new 17 member cabinet is appointed. They are sworn in before President Gotabaya Rajapaksa at 10:30am at the President's House.
- 19 April – The Sri Lanka Freedom Party (SLFP) removes MP Dr. Suren Raghavan from all his positions.
- 20 April – 2022 Sri Lankan protests: One is fatally shot and killed by police gunshots during a protest in Rambukkana. 11 others are injured and are admitted to the Kegalle Teaching Hospital. The Sri Lankan Police informed that a special team of 20 police officers had been appointed under the IGP's instructions to investigate the incident.
- 25 April – Yupun Abeykoon sets a new Asian record in the 150 meters men's event at an athletic meet held in Italy, where the sprinter clocked a time of 15.16 seconds to finish first place in the race.

=== May ===
- 3 May – The Cabinet of Sri Lanka gives the approval to purchase liquefied petroleum (LP) gas from the Thailand-based Siam Gas Company for a period of one year.
- 9 May
  - Mahinda Rajapaksa resigns from his post as Prime Minister amidst violent clashes and the worsening economic crisis.
  - 2022 Sri Lankan protests: Rajapaksa loyalists stage a violent assault against anti-government protesters at the GotaGoGama protest site.
  - A total of six people are rushed to the Wathupitiwala Base Hospital following a shooting incident in the area of Nittambuwa and a 27-year-old from Hapitigama in Kal-Eliya later died from gunshot wounds.
  - 2022 Sri Lankan protests: Polonnaruwa District MP Amarakeerthi Athukorala and his personal security officer are reported dead amidst the unrest in Nittambuwa. Chairman of Imaduwa Pradeshiya Sabha, A.V. Sarath Kumara is also reported dead following an attack on his residence.
  - 2022 Sri Lankan protests: Another curfew is imposed at 7.00 p.m. until 7.00 a.m next morning, but would later be extended by three days.
- 10 May
  - 2022 Sri Lankan protests: Amidst the violent clashes, the vehicle in which MP Kumara Welgama was travelling in is attacked by a group of individuals in the area of Makumbura. Welgama was given ICU treatment at the Homagama Base Hospital. Senior DIG in charge of the Western Province, Deshabandu Tennakoon is injured in an attack carried out by a group of persons at Perahera Mawatha near the Beira Lake in Colombo.
  - 2022 Sri Lankan protests: The armed forces are allowed permission to open fire on any person involved in looting of public property or causing physical harm to others.
- 12 May – 2022 Sri Lankan political crisis: Ranil Wickremesinghe is sworn in as the new Prime Minister. Saman Ekanayake is appointed as the secretary to Prime Minister.
- 17 May
  - Sri Lanka Podujana Peramuna representative from Polonnaruwa District, Jagath Samarawickrama is appointed as a Member of Parliament as the replacement for the late MP Amarakeerthi Athukorala.
  - 2022 Sri Lankan protests: SLPP parliamentarians Sanath Nishantha and Milan Jayatilake are arrested by the Criminal Investigations Department over the violent incidents which took place at Galle Face and Colpetty.
- 18 May – 2022 Sri Lankan protests: The Criminal Investigation Department (CID) arrests four suspects: Moratuwa Mayor Saman Lal Fernando, Dan Priyasad, Seethawakapura Pradeshiya Sabha Chairman Jayantha Rohana and Kelaniya Pradeshiya Sabha Member Manjula Prasanna for their involvement in the attacks on the anti-government protesters in Colombo.
- 20 May – 2022 Sri Lankan political crisis: Nine more Members of Parliament are sworn in as Cabinet Ministers.
- 22 May
  - Sri Lankan-born Cassandra Fernando becomes the first Sri Lankan-born woman to enter the Australian Parliament after getting elected to the Australian Parliament in the federal election, where she contested as the Federal Labor Candidate for Holt, Victoria.
  - Yupun Abeykoon again set a new national record and a South Asian record in the men's 200 meters during an athletic meet held at the 12th Castiglione International Meeting in Grosseto, Italy. He broke the existing records in the 200 meters event by clocking a time of 20.37 seconds.
- 23 May
  - The 2021 GCE Ordinary Level Examinations commence at 3,844 centers island-wide in 542 examination coordination centers and with a total of 517,496 candidates (407,129 school candidates and the other 110,367 are private applicants) sitting for the exams.
  - Sri Lankan cricketer Kusal Mendis is hospitalized after leaving the field, holding his chest minutes before lunch on the first day of the second Test against Bangladesh. The doctors "suspect muscle spasms" as the reason for his discomfort but an ECG test had "come out clear".
- 24 May
  - Sri Lanka hires heavyweight financial and legal advisers Lazard and Clifford Chance as advisers for landmark debt restructuring.
  - Sri Lankan naturalist and a taxonomist of freshwater fish, Dr. Rohan Pethiyagoda is conferred the "Linnean Medal" for Zoology, becoming the first Sri Lankan to achieve the feat.
- 27 May − MP Wimal Weerawansa's wife Shashi Weerawansa is found guilty of submitting forged documents to obtain a diplomatic passport and is sentenced to two years of rigorous imprisonment. She is later released on bail until the conclusion of the appeal hearing on 31 May.
- 28 May − A 9-year-old girl, Fatima Ayesha was reported missing from Atulugama area in Bandaragama on 27 May, until the body was later found in a marshland located close to her home. The National Child Protection Authority (NCPA) launched a special investigation of the incident. The next day, a 29-year-old resident from Atalugama, Faruk Mohamed alias "Koththu Baas" was arrested on suspicion of the death of the little girl. On 31 May, he was produced before the Panadura Magistrate Jayaruwan Dissanayake and charged with murder, abduction, attempted sexual assault, causing injuries and criminal coercion.
- 31 May
  - Major General Vikum Liyanage is appointed as the 24th Commander of Sri Lanka following the retirement of General Shavendra Silva. Liyanage is also promoted to the rank of Lieutenant General. Meanwhile, General Shavendra Silva is appointed as the new Chief of Defence Staff.
  - The Supreme Court issues an interim order suspending the special presidential pardon granted to former MP Duminda Silva while he was serving a death sentence and was later arrested.

=== June ===
- 2 June
  - Municipal Councillor Mahinda Kahandagama surrenders to the Criminal Investigation Department and is later arrested after he was named as a suspect in the case filed over the incidents of violence on 9 May in Galle Face and Kollupitiya.
  - The Colombo Commercial High Court issues an enjoining order preventing the Moscow-bound flight in question from leaving Sri Lanka. According to the order, the Airbus A330 Aeroflot, scheduled to fly to Moscow, was detained at the Bandaranaike International Airport with 191 Russian tourists. Later, on 4 June, Russia announced that they would be suspending commercial flights to Sri Lanka. Finally, on 6 June, the Colombo Commercial High Court issued an order for the immediate suspension of the injunction order issued against the aircraft.
- 6 June
  - Minister Prasanna Ranatunga is sentenced to two years of rigorous imprisonment and suspended for a period of five years by the Colombo High Court in the case filed against him over the Meethotamulla land dispute.
  - Samagi Jana Balawegaya MP Dilip Wedaarachchi's son, Former chairman of Tangalle Urban Council, Ravindu Wedaarachchi and daughter-in-law, Nethmi Harindika Silva are arrested on charges of obstructing police officers from carrying out their duties due to an incident at the Bedigama entrance to the Southern Expressway.
- 7 June
  - Mohamed Uvais Mohamed is appointed as the new Chairman of the Ceylon Petroleum Corporation.
  - Major General Jagath Kodithuwakku, the present Deputy Chief of Staff of the Sri Lanka Army is appointed the new Chief of Staff of the Army.
- 9 June − Former finance minister Basil Rajapaksa resigns from his National List seat in Parliament, but claimed that he would contest again and return in the next election. Rajapaksa blamed the economic crisis on Rajapaksa voters and denied that the Rajapaksa family would ever exit politics.
- 13 June − Sri Lankan international cricketer Angelo Mathews is voted as the ICC Men's Player of the Month for May 2022, becoming the first Sri Lankan to achieve the feat, after compiling 344 runs at an average of 172 over the course of the two Tests against Bangladesh.
- 21 June − 2019–present Sri Lankan economic crisis: The overall rate of inflation as measured by the National Consumer Price Index on Year-on-Year basis reaches a record high of 45.3% in May 2022.
- 22 June − 2022 Sri Lankan political crisis: Business magnate Dhammika Perera takes oath as a National List Member of Parliament to fill in the vacancy following the resignation of Basil Rajapaksa. On 24 June, Perera is sworn in as the Minister of Investment Promotion.
- 29 June − A total of 232 inmates who had escaped from the Kandakadu rehabilitation centre in Welikanda had escaped following a tense situation that ensued over the death of an inmate last evening. During the situation, one inmate has died. Later on 2 July 2022, two army and two air force personnel have been arrested in connection with the death of the inmate.

=== July ===
- 1 July − International cricketer Angelo Mathews tests positive for COVID-19 amidst a First test between Australia and Sri Lanka.
- 2 July − Veteran actor Jackson Anthony and two others are hospitalized following a fatal accident at Thalawa in Anuradhapura after the vehicle they were travelling in collided with a wild elephant.
- 3 July − 13-year old Pranirsha Thyagarajah wins first place in the second season of Sirasa Voice Teens, a popular singing competition.
- 4 July
  - International cricketer Praveen Jayawickrama has tests positive for COVID-19.
  - Sri Lankan sprinter Yupun Abeykoon wins gold at the Resisprint International athletic meet held in Switzerland, breaking the South Asian record for the second time in 2022 clicking recording a time of 9.96 and becomes the first South Asian athlete to finish a 100-meter sprint in less than 10 seconds.
- 6 July − 2022 Sri Lankan protests: Former MP Hirunika Premachandra and 11 others, who were previously arrested by police while protesting in front of the President's House in Colombo Fort, are granted police bail.
- 9 July
  - 2022 Sri Lankan protests: Hundreds of thousands of protesters breach the President's official residence and set fire to the Prime Minister's private residence in Colombo. Protesters claimed they would occupy the President's House until both the President and Prime Minister resign.
  - President Gotabaya Rajapaksa announces he will resign on 13 July and Prime Minister Ranil Wickremesinghe announces his intention to resign once a new all-party government is formed.
- 12 July − As a mark of respect for former Japanese Prime Minister Shinzo Abe, Sri Lanka observes a day of national mourning with the national flag flown at half-mast on state buildings.
- 13 July
  - 2022 Sri Lankan political crisis: Despite his initial announcement, President Gotabaya Rajapaksa does not resign on the 13th as originally pledged. Instead Rajapaksa flees the country via military aircraft for the Maldives and appoints Prime Minister Ranil Wickremesinghe as Acting President to exercise Presidential duties during his absence.
  - 2022 Sri Lankan protests: In reaction to this appointment, protesters storm the office of the Prime Minister demanding Acting President Ranil Wickremesinghe's resignation. In the evening, protesters reportedly attempted to breach the police barricades placed along the road leading to the Parliament. Wickremesinghe declared an island wide curfew until 5:00 am the next day.
- 14 July − 2022 Sri Lankan political crisis: President Gotabaya Rajapaksa emails his resignation letter to the Speaker of the Parliament after fleeing to Singapore, officially ending his presidency.
- 20 July − 2022 Sri Lankan presidential election: Ranil Wickremesinghe is elected as President of Sri Lanka by the Parliament, following the resignation of Gotabaya Rajapaksa. The following day, Wickremesinghe is sworn in as the 9th President of Sri Lanka.
- 22 July
  - 2022 Sri Lankan political crisis: Dinesh Gunawardena is sworn as the new prime minister of Sri Lanka, and a new cabinet consisting of 18 ministers is appointed by the president.
  - General Kamal Gunaratne is re-appointed as the Secretary to the Ministry of Defence by the President.
  - 2022 Sri Lankan protests: The Armed Forces of Sri Lanka storm protest sites at Galle Face Green to clear the Presidential Secretariat and its main entrance of demonstrators. However, tensions escalated as troops began to forcefully remove protesters from the premises, and several assaults on civilians were reported by security forces where nine people were placed under arrest by the police and two of them were reportedly injured.

=== August ===
- 10 August − 2022 Sri Lankan protests: Protesters vacate Galle Face Green and Gotagogama, after occupying the premises for 124 days.

=== September ===
- 2 September − Exile of Gotabaya Rajapaksa: Former President Gotabaya Rajapaksa returns to Sri Lanka after a 52-day self-exile.
- 11 September − Sri Lanka wins the 2022 Asia Cup held in the United Arab Emirates, beating Pakistan by 23 runs in the final.
- 19 September − A national day of mourning is observed on the day of the state funeral of Elizabeth II, Queen of Ceylon from 1952 to 1972.

=== October ===
- 17 October − Sri Lankan writer Shehan Karunatilaka wins the 2022 Booker Prize for his novel The Seven Moons of Maali Almeida. He is the second Sri Lankan to win the prize.
- 21 October − The 21st Amendment to the Constitution of Sri Lanka is passed, with two-thirds of the Parliament voting in favour.

=== November ===
- 4 November − Sri Lanka confirms its first case of monkeypox.
- 9 November − Sri Lanka confirms its second case of monkeypox.

== Deaths ==
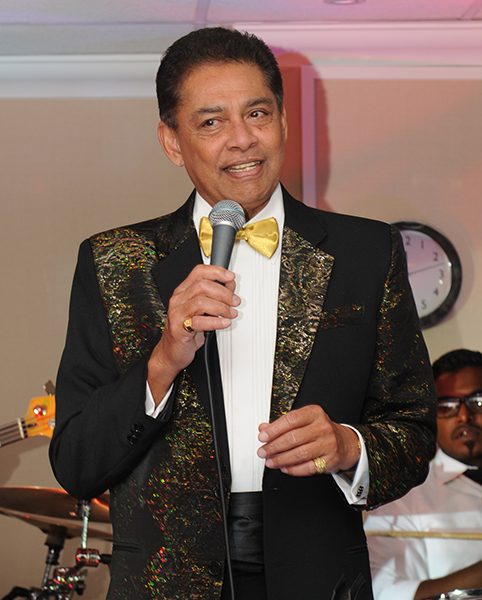
Desmond de Silva (b. 1944)

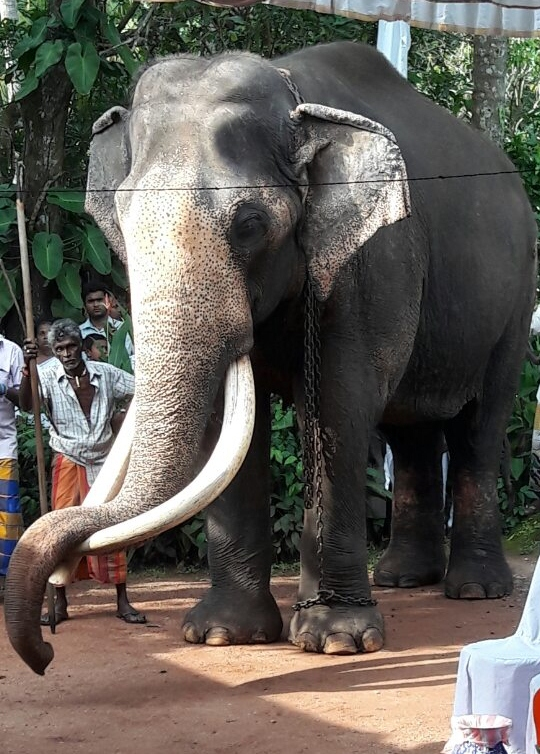
Nadungamuwa Raja (circa. 1953)

=== January ===
- 8 January – Robin Fernando, 84 (actor)
- 9 January
  - Desmond de Silva, 78 (singer)
  - Gamini Ambalangoda, 66 (dramatist)
- 17 January – Neela Wickramasinghe, 72 (songstress)
- 18 January – Air Chief Marshal Pathman Hariprasadha Mendis, 88 (aviator)

=== February ===
- 10 February – Oshadie Kuruppu, 27 (badminton player)
- 15 February − Saman Chandranath Weerasinghe, 77 (lyricist)
- 20 February − Tissa Bandaranayake, 65 (actor)
- 23 February − Sunil Madhava Premathilake, 78 (journalist)
- 24 February − Bandula Padmakumara, 71 (journalist)
- 26 February
  - Duckson Puslas, 31 (footballer)
  - Channa Jayanath, (lyricist)

=== March ===
- 6 March − Berty Gunathilake, 97 (actor)
- 7 March − Nadungamuwa Raja, 69 (royal tusker)
- 10 March − Nimal Weerakkody, 70 (film producer)
- 26 March − Mallika Pilapitiya, 86 (actress)
- 31 March − Athauda Seneviratne, 91 (politician)

=== April ===
- 2 April − Victor Hettigoda, 84 (entrepreneur)
- 12 April − Shiraz 'Rude Bwoy' Yoonus, 29 (singer)
- 23 April − Barbara Sansoni, 94 (artist)
- 24 April − Kaushalya Madushani, 26 (athlete)
- 28 April − Anusha Sonali, 47 (actress)

=== May ===
- 2 May − A. Lionel Silva, 79 (author)
- 3 May − Wilson Karu, 79 (actor)
- 9 May − Amarakeerthi Athukorala, 57 (politician)
- 10 May − Victor Vijayantha, 77 (singer)
- 14 May − Lakshman Hulugalle, 66 (diplomat)
- 18 May − A. C. M. Lafir, 86 (cricketer)
- 23 May − Swarna Kahawita, 75 (actress)

=== June ===
- 2 June − Meryl Fernando, (singer)
- 5 June − Sumana Amarasinghe, 74 (actress)
- 7 June − Sandadas Koparahewa, 99 (literate)
- 8 June − Sena Vidanagama, 76 (photographer)
- 16 June
  - Karu Nanayakkara, 90 (actor)
  - Deshamanya Mineka Wickramasingha, 87 (businessman)
- 19 June − Leonie Kotelawala, 78 (actress)
- 20 June − M.V. Hemapala, 75 (cinematographer)

=== August ===
- 28 August − Donald Karunaratne, 77 (cinematographer)

=== September ===
- 3 September − Anura Medagoda, 74 (film actor)
- 4 September − Wimal Ranjith Fernando, 79 (filmmaker)
- 29 September − Hector Wijesiri, 84 (lyricist)

=== October ===
- 2 October − Darshan Dharmaraj, 41 (actor)
- 17 October − Wimal Sriyarathna, 86 (musician)
- 18 October − Samson Kumarage, 62 (filmmaker)
- 19 October − Dr. Pallegama Sirinivasa Nayaka Thero, 69 (Buddhist monk)

=== November ===
- 20 November − Alfred Perera, 93 (dramatist)

=== December ===
- 1 December
  - Upali Senarath (film producer)
  - Danny W. Pathirana (cinematographer)
- 2 December − Hemasri de Alwis (lyricist)
- 8 December − Nuwan Gunawardena, 72 (singer)
- 23 December − Clive Inman, 86 (cricketer)
