= George Beven =

Sri Lankan artist, designer, and journalist (1929–2023)

- Born: 1929; Negombo, Western Province, British Ceylon
- Died: 29 January 2023 (aged 93); London, England
- Occupations: Artist, designer and writer
- Spouse: Wolfgang Stange

George Beven (1929 – 29 January 2023) was a Sri Lankan-English designer, artist, fashion designer and journalist. He is best remembered for his use of colour and is regarded as one of Sri Lanka's finest figurative painters as well as one of the country's greatest contemporary artists. The majority of his life was lived in England but he had made occasional visits to Sri Lanka to conduct art exhibitions at various locations including Barefoot and Lionel Wendt Art Centre.

== Early life ==
Beven initially studied at Newstead College, Negombo where his mother taught him music until the age of 12. He was also a child dancer during his stay at Newstead College. His art teacher at Newstead College convinced and encouraged him to paint and send his entries to art competitions in England.

Beven later switched to Maris Stella College where he found his groove and passion pointed towards painting which he pursued as a hobby. He even sent a couple of line drawings to the Ceylon Observer for which the Editor of the Women's Pages Anne Abayasekara responded with a job offer for him to work as an artist for the newspaper press. However, he was initially reluctant to accept it as he was preparing for his SSC examinations and promised that he will join once he completed his exams. He later became the first paid artist on the Ceylon Observer. He was sent for evening classes at Heywood Art College where he eventually learnt the art of drawing human figure from the renowned artist David Paynter.

== Career ==
Beven initially embarked on a career pursuing journalism when he began his stint with The Observer. He was initially sent by Associated Newspapers of Ceylon Limited to Saint Martin's School of Art, London in 1955 in order to learn more of his craft on fashion designing and illustration. He then returned to Sri Lanka a year later in 1956 after gaining experience working as a journalist, artist and as a fashion designer. His return to his mother country was overshadowed by turn of events triggered by the consequences of the implementation of infamous Sinhala Only Act in 1956. However, he decided to settle in the UK in 1958 after seeing both his mother and sister migrating to the UK.

Beven conducted his first solo exhibition in 1958 at the Royal Empire Society. He made a name for himself with his ability of painting in oils using his fingers. He also became known for tooth brush paintings during the 1970s, 1980s and 1990s, which portrayed many famous artists of the time including the likes of Margot Fonteyn, Rudolf Nureyev, Mikhail Baryshmikov from the classical ballet as well as veteran Hollywood actors such as Marlene Dietrich, Judy Garland, Liza Minnelli, Marilyn Monroe, James Dean and Sylvester Stallone. He experimented with poster colours and gouache using unconventional colour combinations.

== Personal life and death ==
Beven initially met his lifelong partner Wolfgang Stange in the early 1970s. He died at his residence in London on 29 January 2023, at the age of 93.
