= Anne Abayasekara =

Sri Lankan journalist (1925–2015)

Annette Aurelia Abayasekara (1925 - 4 January, 2015) was a Sri Lankan journalist. She is considered the country's first female staff journalist, having started her career in 1947.

== Biography ==
Abayasekara was educated at Ladies' College, Colombo. When she was 17, she had an interview at Lake House, the head office of Associated Newspapers of Ceylon Ltd. As it was wartime and newsprint paper was rationed, all newspapers had suspended their women's sections and she was offered a clerical position until such time as the women's pages were reinstated. She started work at Lake House in 1943; in 1947, the women's sections were re-opened and an Indian expatriate, Leela Shukla, was appointed editor. A few months later Shukla resigned and Abayasekara replaced her as editor of the women’s page of the Daily News and Sunday Observer. She resigned from this position in 1951, and began to write as a freelance journalist for The Sun newspaper and The Times of Ceylon and in 1984 was invited to write a weekly column for the new publication Lanka Woman.

In 1946, she married Earle Abayasekara; they had a family of seven children together.

She died in January 2015, at the age of 89.

== Awards and honours ==
In 2013, she received an excellence in journalism award from the Sri Lanka Press Institute in recognition of her life's service to journalism.

== Publications ==
- Abayasekara, A. (2018). Telling it like it is: Selected writings Volume 1.
