= Litro Gas =

Gas company in Sri Lanka

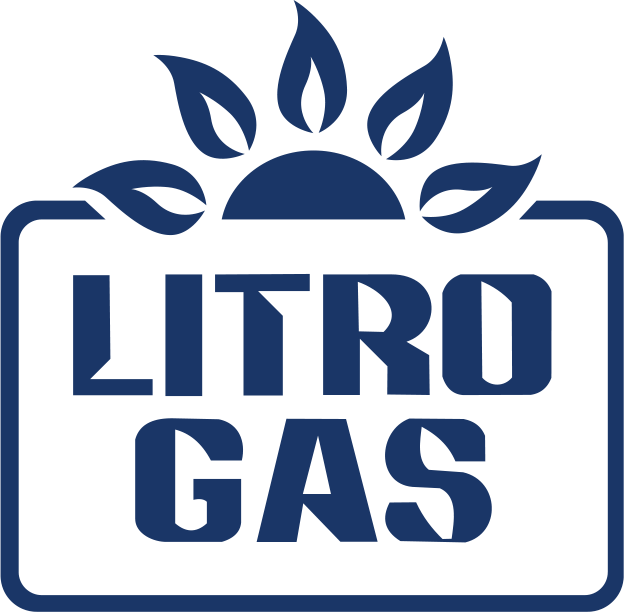
- Industry: Gas
- Predecessor: Colombo Gas and Water Company
- Founded: 1872; 153 years ago in Ratmalana, Ceylon.
- Headquarters: NO 267, Union Place, Colombo 02
- Key people: Channa Gunawardana (Chairman and CEO)
- Revenue: ▲ Rs 1.538 billion (2018)
- Net income: ▲ Rs 297 million (2018)
- Parent: CEYPETCO
- Website: www.litrogas.com

Litro Gas is Sri Lanka's largest gas company. It controls 85% of Sri Lanka's gas market. The company is wholly owned by Sri Lanka Insurance Corporation.

Established in 1872 as Colombo Gas and Water Company, it was a wholly owned subsidiary of Royal Dutch Shell until 2010, when it was purchased by the government of Sri Lanka. The company's current name was adopted in 2010. In 2020 Litro Gas brought Hambantota Port LPG tanks. The port is operated by China Merchants Port.

== History ==
Litro Gas was originally established by British Ceylon Government in 1872 as Colombo Gas and Water Company. Company's first main office located in Gas Works Street (Gas Paha Junction), Colombo. In 1996, Royal Dutch Shell acquired Colombo Gas and Water Company for US$37 million. The company was incorporated as a subsidiary of Shell Company. Shell company monopoly was created in 1996. Shell's monopoly ended after Government LPG distribution was given to the LAUGFS Gas PLC in 2001. 14 years after Sri Lankan Government brought back majority stake for US$63 million. In 2010 it became a wholly owned subsidiary of CPC.

== Gas Explosions ==
A total of 847 gas related accidents were reported in 2021. In addition, 7 people died from these accidents, while 16 others were injured and 18 incidents resulted in property damage.

The primary justification behind the new gas related mishaps has been distinguished as the adjustment of the structure of gas, Prof. Shantha Walpolage (University of Moratuwa), the Chairman of the Committee selected by the President Gotabaya to yest gas-related mishaps, said. "The cylinders, regulators, stoves and other equipment have remained unchanged. What was subjected to change was the gas composition" he highlighted.

Accordingly, Pro Walpolage repeated that the primary justification for the new gas blasts could be credited to the gas arrangement. Various cases identified with gas blasts were accounted for in the county throughout the previous one month raising worries among individuals. Likewise, a Committee was designated by the President on 30 November to investigate the episodes of LPG chamber flames and blasts.
