= All Saints' Church, Borella =

Roman Catholic church in Borella, Sri Lanka

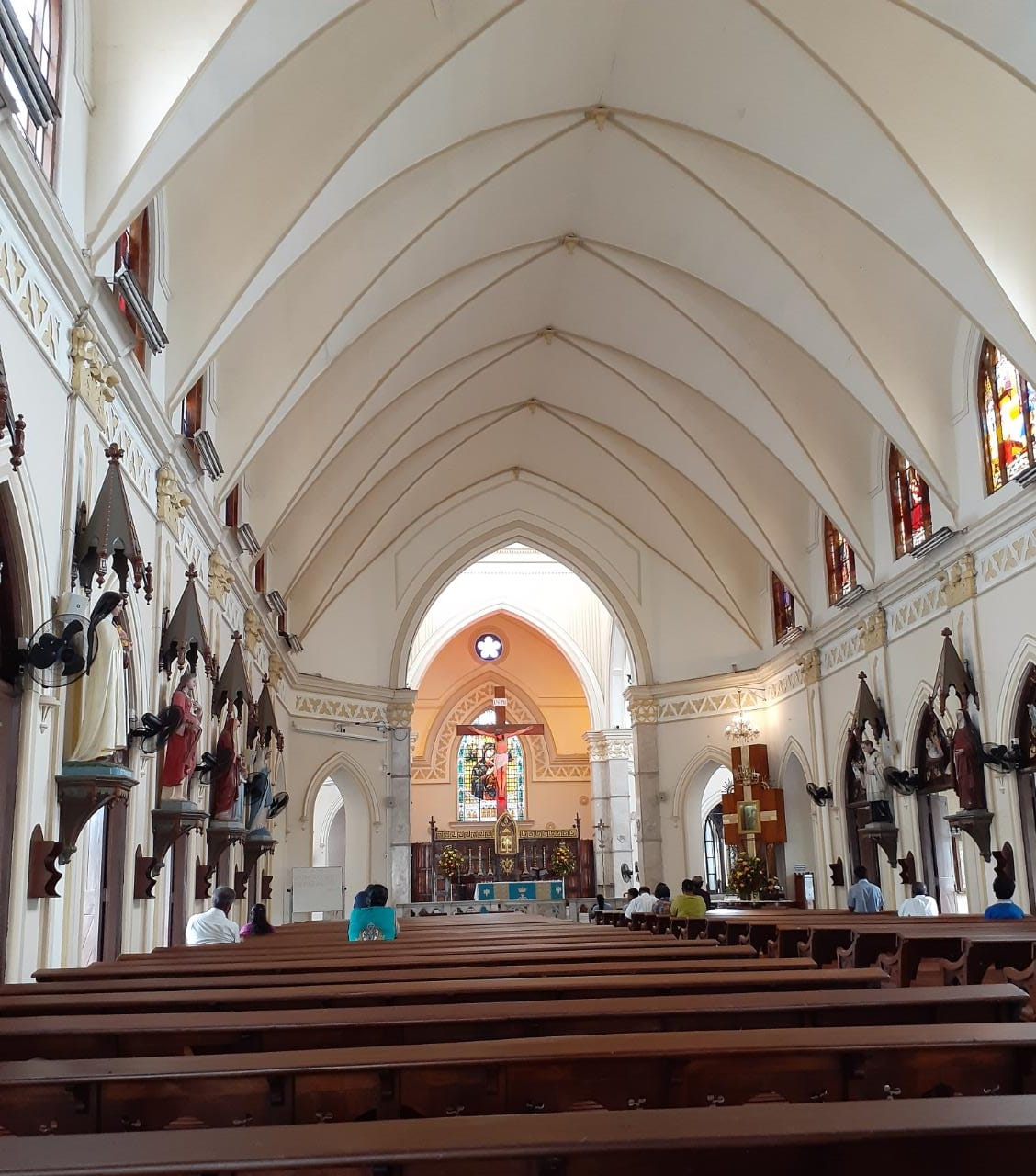
- The main nave of Saints' Church, Borella

General information
- Type: Church
- Architectural style: Gothic
- Location: Borella, Colombo-8, Sri Lanka
- Coordinates: 6°55′15″N 79°52′30″E
- Construction started: 1886
- Owner: Roman Catholic Archdiocese of Colombo

All Saints' Church is a Catholic church located in Borella, Colombo, Sri Lanka. It is administered by the Roman Catholic Archdiocese of Colombo and belongs to the Borella parish. It was constructed in 1886.

== History ==
The beginnings of the church date back to 1884, when Wyndham Thompson, wife of the Superintendent of the Convict Establishment (Welikada Prisons) and an enthusiastic Irish Catholic lady, met the Governor of Ceylon and reserved 0.81 ha (2 acres) from the 8.1 ha (20 acres) allocated to the Campbell park to build a church, following endorsement from the Governor's wife. It is reported that the Governor, Sir Arthur Hamilton-Gordon arranged for Latin documents to be placed within a glass jar and inserted into the original foundation stone. The stone itself was laid by Father Christophe Ernest Bonjean in 1886. This church was dedicated to All Saints and the church was later reconstructed, with renovation work starting on 24 August 1935. In the 1950s, the priest of All Saints would often hold a monthly mass at the nearby hospital, when the local Church of England in Ceylon ceased to do so.

In 2022, the church was targeted in an attempted Islamic terrorist plot with a failed bomb attack on it. The bomb was discovered and made safe before it detonated.

== Interior ==
The interior of the church is very colourful with stained glass windows with the main window above the altar depicting Mother of Perpetual Help. There is also a painting of Our Lady that was originally in San Matteo in Merulana in Rome, Italy. There was a fire in the church but the painting miraculously survived and was moved to Ceylon to be hung in All Saints. The church also features a carillon made up of 25 bells cast in West Germany with each bell having a name of a saint. The church has a balcony for the choir.

== Notable people ==
- Fr. John Herath (Parish Priest, 1948–1977)
