= World Coconut Day =

International day

World Coconut Day is an international day established by the Asian and Pacific Coconut Community (APCC), which is an intergovernmental organisation of coconut producing countries to recognize the importance of coconut. World Coconut Day has been observed on September 2 each year since 2009. It is celebrated by the farmers of coconut producing countries like India, Malaysia, Indonesia, the Philippines, Thailand, Kenya and Vietnam and the stakeholders in the coconut growing business. Various activities related to promotion of coconut consumption and events to create awareness on the benefits of consuming coconuts are organized on the day.
