= Inauguration of Ranil Wickremesinghe =

- Emblem of Sri Lanka
- Date: July 21, 2022
- Time: 10.05 AM
- Location: Parliament of Sri Lanka
- Type: Presidential Inauguration
- Participants: Ranil Wickremesinghe; 8th executive president of Sri Lanka — Assuming office Jayantha Jayasuriya; Chief Justice of Sri Lanka — Administering oath

The inauguration of Ranil Wickremesinghe as the 8th executive president of the Democratic Socialist Republic of Sri Lanka took place on Thursday, 21 July 2022. This officially marked the beginning of Wickremesinghe's term in office, which concluded in November 2024.

This Extraordinary inauguration took place amidst severe political and economic turmoil, including an ongoing economic crisis and the 2022 Sri Lankan political crisis which forced his Predecessor Gotabaya Rajapaksa to resign from the office of the President on July 14, 2022. Since then Prime Minister Wickremesinghe discharged the powers and functions of the office of the President in an Acting Capacity where he was outright elected as the Executive President after he was voted in through a secret ballot election conducted by the Parliament on Wednesday, 20 July 2022. He received 134 out of the 219 valid votes. This inauguration took place at the Parliament of Sri Lanka. The oath of office was administered by Chief Justice Jayantha Jayasuriya in the presence of the Speaker of the Parliament Mahinda Yapa Abeywardena.

According to the Article 40 of the Constitution of Sri Lanka Wickremesinghe will complete the remainder of former President Gotabaya Rajapaksa's term, after the latter resigned from the Presidency on 14 July 2022. Wickremesinghe is also eligible for re-election in the 2024 Sri Lankan presidential election.
