= Ali Sabri Raheem =

Sri Lankan politician

Hon. Ali Sabri Raheem MP
- அலி சப்ரி ரஹீம் අලි සප්රි රහීම්

Member of the Parliament of Sri Lanka
- Incumbent
- Assumed office 2020
- Constituency: Puttalam District

Personal details
- Born: Abdul Ali Sabri Mohamed Raheem; 5 January 1963 (age 63) Puttalam
- Party: All Ceylon Makkal Congress
- Other political affiliations: Muslim National Alliance

Abdul Ali Sabri Mohamed Raheem (born 5 January 1963) is a Sri Lankan politician and Member of Parliament.

Raheem was born on 5 January 1963. He has a Dip. in Business Management apart from G.C.E. (A/L) and G.C.E. (O/L). He is the All Ceylon Makkal Congress' organizer for Puttalam District

Raheem contested the 2020 parliamentary election as a Muslim National Alliance electoral alliance candidate in Puttalam District and was elected to the Parliament of Sri Lanka.

He voted in favor of 20 Amendment which brought by the Sri Lanka Podujana Peramuna to strengthen the president.

Electoral history of Ali Sabri Raheem
Election	Constituency	Party	Alliance	Votes	Result
2020 parliamentary	Puttalam District	All Ceylon Makkal Congress	Muslim National Alliance	33,509	Elected
