= Third Dudley Senanayake cabinet =

- 8th Cabinet of Ceylon

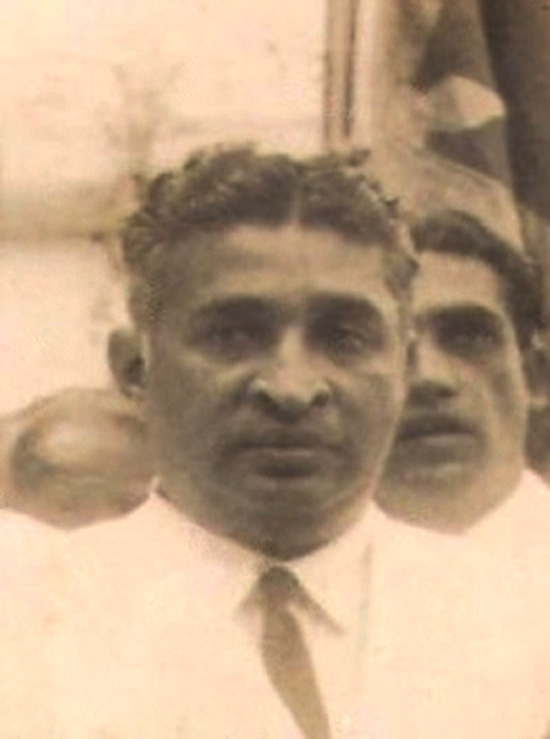
- Date formed: 25 March 1965
- Date dissolved: 29 May 1970

People and organisations
- Monarch: Elizabeth II
- Prime Minister: Dudley Senanayake
- Member parties: United National Party; Illankai Tamil Arasu Kachchi (1965–68); Sri Lanka Freedom Socialist Party; Mahajana Eksath Peramuna; Jathika Vimukthi Peramuna (1965–66); Supported by: Illankai Tamil Arasu Kachchi (1968–70); All Ceylon Tamil Congress; Ceylon Workers' Congress; Independents
- Status in legislature: Majority coalition
- Opposition party: Sri Lanka Freedom Party
- Opposition leader: Sirimavo Bandaranaike

History
- Election: 1965
- Outgoing election: 1970
- Legislature term: 6th
- Predecessor: Sirimavo Bandaranaike I
- Successor: Sirimavo Bandaranaike II

The Third Dudley Senanayake cabinet was the central government of Ceylon led by Prime Minister Dudley Senanayake between 1965 and 1970. It was formed in March 1965 after the parliamentary election and it ended in May 1970 after the opposition's victory in the parliamentary election.

== Cabinet members ==
| Name | Portrait | Party | Office | Took office | Left office | Refs |
|---|---|---|---|---|---|---|
| Dudley Senanayake | | United National Party | Prime Minister | 25 March 1965 | 29 May 1970 | |
| Dudley Senanayake | | United National Party | Minister of Defence and External Affairs | | | |
| Dudley Senanayake | | United National Party | Minister of Information and Broadcasting | | | |
| Dudley Senanayake | | United National Party | Minister of Planning and Economic Affairs | | | |
| M. D. Banda | | United National Party | Minister of Agriculture and Food | | | |
| W. Dahanayake | | Sri Lanka Freedom Socialist Party | Minister of Home Affairs | March 1965 | | |
| C. P. de Silva | | Sri Lanka Freedom Socialist Party | Minister of Land, Irrigation and Power | March 1965 | | |
| Philip Gunawardena | | Mahajana Eksath Peramuna | Minister of Industries and Fisheries | March 1965 | | |
| E. L. B. Hurulle | | United National Party | Minister of Communications | | | |
| I. M. R. A. Iriyagolla | | United National Party | Minister of Education and Cultural Affairs | March 1965 | | |
| M. D. H. Jayawardena | | United National Party | Minister of Health | | | |
| Montague Jayawickrama | | United National Party | Minister of Public Works, Posts and Telecommunications | | | |
| J. R. Jayewardene | | United National Party | Minister of State | March 1965 | | |
| Asoka Karunaratne | | United National Party | Minister of Social Services | | | |
| M. H. Mohamed | | United National Party | Minister of Labour, Employment and Housing | March 1965 | | |
| Senator M. V. P. Peiris | | | Minister of Commerce and Trade | | | |
| Senator J. A. Amaratunga | | | Minister of Information and Broadcasting | | | |
| Ranasinghe Premadasa | | United National Party | Minister of Local Government | 1968 | | |
| V. A. Sugathadasa | | | Minister of Nationalised Services | 1966 | | |
| Senator M. Tiruchelvam | | Illankai Tamil Arasu Kachchi | Minister of Local Government | March 1965 | November 1968 | |
| U. B. Wanninayake | | | Minister of Finance | 27 March 1965 | 25 March 1970 | |
| A. F. Wijemanne | | United National Party | Minister of Justice | | | |

== Parliamentary secretaries ==
| Name | Portrait | Party | Office | Took office | Left office | Refs |
|---|---|---|---|---|---|---|
| D. P. Atapattu | | United National Party | Parliamentary Secretary to the Minister of State | 1965 | 1970 | |
| C. R. Beligammana | | | Parliamentary Secretary to the Minister of Home Affairs | | | |
| L. B. Dassanayake | | | Parliamentary Secretary to the Minister of Communications | | | |
| P. C. Imbulana | | United National Party | Parliamentary Secretary to the Minister of Agriculture and Food | | | |
| Shelton Jayasinghe | | | Parliamentary Secretary to the Minister of Industries and Fisheries | | | |
| S. de S. Jayasinghe | | | Parliamentary Secretary to the Minister of Labour, Employment and Housing | | | |
| Gamini Jayasuriya | | United National Party | Parliamentary Secretary to the Minister of Education and Cultural Affairs | | | |
| J. R. Jayewardene | | United National Party | Parliamentary Secretary to the Minister of Defence and External Affairs | March 1965 | | |
| Wimala Kannangara | | | Parliamentary Secretary to the Minister of Health | | | |
| M. H. M. Naina Marikar | | | Parliamentary Secretary to the Minister of Justice | | | |
| Wijayapala Mendis | | | Parliamentary Secretary to the Minister of Public Works, Posts and Telecommunications | | | |
| M. M. Mustapha | | | Parliamentary Secretary to the Minister of Social Services | | | |
| S. A. Peeris | | | Parliamentary Secretary to the Minister of Commerce and Trade | | | |
| Kusuma Rajaratne | | Jathika Vimukthi Peramuna | Parliamentary Secretary to the Minister of Home Affairs | March 1965 | 1966 | |
| Ranasinghe Premadasa | | United National Party | Parliamentary Secretary to the Minister of Information and Broadcasting | | | |
| Ranasinghe Premadasa | | United National Party | Parliamentary Secretary to the Minister of Local Government | | | |
| C. P. J. Seneviratne | | | Parliamentary Secretary to the Minister of Land, Irrigation and Power | | | |
| D. B. Welagedara | | United National Party | Parliamentary Secretary to the Minister of Nationalised Services | | | |
| Noel Wimalasena | | | Parliamentary Secretary to the Minister of Finance | 29 March 1965 | 25 March 1970 | |
