= Amaratunga =

Amaratunga is a surname. Notable people with the surname include:

- John Amaratunga, Sri Lankan politician and lawyer
- Dilanthi Amaratunga, Sri Lankan scientist
- Chanaka Amaratunga, Sri Lankan politician
- J. E. Amaratunga, Ceylonese planter, lawyer and politician
- J. A. Amaratunga, Member of Sri Lanka Senate
- Nimal Gamini Amaratunga, Sri Lankan judge
