= D. P. Atapattu =

Ceylonese politician (1899–1976)

Hon. D. P. Atapattu JP, UM
- ඩී. පී. අතපත්තු டி. பி. அத்தபத்து
- Atapattu in 1966

Parliamentary Secretary to the Cabinet Minister of State
- In office 1965–1970
- Minister: J. R. Jayewardene
- Preceded by: Position created
- Succeeded by: Position abolished

Member of the Ceylon Parliament for Beliatta
- In office 1965–1970
- Preceded by: D. A. Rajapaksa
- Succeeded by: Mahinda Rajapaksa
- In office March 1960 – July 1960
- Preceded by: D. A. Rajapaksa
- Succeeded by: D. A. Rajapaksa

Personal details
- Born: Don Peter Atapattu; 17 September 1899 Nakulugamuwa, Tangalle, British Ceylon
- Died: 14 December 1976 (aged 77) Tangalle, Sri Lanka
- Party: United National Party
- Spouse: Daya Dahanayake
- Relations: Atapattu family Dr Karunasena Kodituwakku
- Children: Ranjit; Indrani
- Parent(s): Don Johannes Atapattu; Kadawedduwage Dona Carolina Wijekoon
- Education: St. Thomas' College, Matara; S. Thomas' College, Mount Lavinia; Ananda College
- Occupation: Politician
- Profession: Lawyer

Don Peter Atapattu (Note: Sinhala: දොන් පීටර් අතපත්තු; Tamil: டொன் பீட்டர் அத்தபத்து; IPA: [dˈɒn pˈiːtə ˈatɐpˌatuː]) (17 September 1899 – 14 December 1976) was a Ceylonese politician and Member of Parliament (MP) who represented the Beliatta electorate in Hambantota District from March 1960 to July 1960, and from 1965 to 1970. He was a founding member of the United National Party (UNP) and served as the Parliamentary Secretary (Note: Deputy Minister according to the Sri Lankan Constitution of 1972.) to the Cabinet Minister of State, J. R. Jayewardene.

Born in Nakulugamuwa, Tangalle, Atapattu graduated from Ananda College, Colombo, becoming one of the upper-school teachers in Mahabodhi College, Colombo. After being called to the bar as a proctor to the Supreme Court of Ceylon, Atapattu was nominated as the UNP candidate for Beliatta at the general parliamentary elections in 1947, 1952, 1956, March 1960, July 1960 and 1965 against D. A. Rajapaksa, winning the seat in two of the six elections.

== Early life and education ==
Don Peter Atapattu was born on 17 September 1899, in the village of Nakulugamuwa near Tangalle in Hambantota District, to Don Johanis Atapattu and a daughter of the Wijekoon family from Matara. Don Johanis was the acting Registrar of Births and Deaths for Nakulugamuwa in 1915 and in 1938 was awarded the title of Muhandiram. Don Peter had six younger brothers and one sister, Soma, who later became the mother-in-law of Karunasena Kodituwakku.

Atapattu was first educated at Gamini Maha Vidyalaya, Nakulugamuwa, then received higher education at St. Thomas' College, Matara. He then entered the prestigious Anglican school, S. Thomas' College, Mount Lavinia. His classics master, T. B. Jayah, found that Atapattu did not have the discipline expected by the then Warden, William Arthur Stone, so he suggested him to move to Ananda College, Colombo. At Ananda, Atapattu was educated under the school's principal, Patrick de Silva Kularatne.

After graduating from Ananda, in 1922, Atapattu enrolled as a law student. He taught in various schools, including Mahabodhi College, Colombo, where he was an upper-school teacher and was responsible for the students' safety drills and games during the 1922–23 school year.

== Early political and legal career ==
=== Early political career ===
In 1919, Atapattu joined the pro-independence political party Ceylon National Congress (CNC), where he represented Tangalle in Southern Province, British Ceylon. He was interested by the harmony among the Sinhalese and Tamil leaders of the CNC, but became disillusioned when the Sinhalese leaders fought with the Tamil leaders over the reserving of the Colombo Town seat.

=== Legal career ===
In 1927, Atapattu was called to the bar as a proctor to the Supreme Court of Ceylon. He then started his legal practice in the Unofficial Bar in Tangalle. While still in the Unofficial Bar, Atapattu married Daya Dahanayake in 1932. They had two children, Ranjit and Indrani, the latter of whom later migrated to Australia.

In 1944, following his success in enabling Tangalle to establish an Urban Council, Atapattu was nominated as a candidate for the election of members of the Urban Council. He was elected to the council and became its first Chairman in 1945. Later, he was chosen by the then Attorney General, Hema Henry Basnayake, as the Crown Proctor of Tangalle.

In 1950, Atapattu was appointed as the Additional District Judge, Additional Magistrate and Additional Commissioner of Requests for Tangalle from 7 to 12 June, while P. R. Gunasekera was away.

== United National Party ==
When D. S. Senanayake formed the United National Party (UNP) in 1946, many politicians, including Atapattu and D. A. Rajapaksa, joined it. The party's nominations board nominated Atapattu as a candidate for the Beliatta electorate in 1947. Both Atapattu and Rajapaksa contested Beliatta at the six general parliamentary elections held between 1947 and 1965, but Rajapaksa left the UNP in 1951 to join the Sri Lankan Freedom Party (SLFP).

=== Parliamentary elections ===
Atapattu lost the 1947 parliamentary elections, when Rajapaksa defeated him by a majority of 8,022 votes. At the 1952 and 1956 parliamentary elections, Rajapaksa won the seat with 17,382 and 26,215 votes, which was 3,632 and 15,335 votes more than Atapattu, respectively.

At the March 1960 parliamentary elections, Atapattu won the Beliatta seat, beating Rajapaksa who was now contesting it for the Mahajana Eksath Peramuna (MEP). He became a Member of the House of Representatives for the electorate, serving the role until 23 April. However, when the UNP government was dissolved due to not having a majority, (Note: In March 1960, UNP did not reach the majority of 76 seats; they only got 50.) Atapattu's opponent re-contested the seat for the SLFP and regained it at the July 1960 parliamentary elections.

At the 1965 parliamentary elections, Atapattu won back the Beliatta seat. He became the Parliamentary Secretary to the Cabinet Minister of State, J. R. Jayewardene, until 1970, when he resigned and retired from politics.

=== Other events ===
In 1965, Atapattu led the Ceylonese delegation to that year's Commonwealth Parliamentary Conference in Wellington, New Zealand, with Clerk to the House of Representatives, Sam Wijesinha, serving as the delegation's Secretary. He then assumed the role as the Acting Parliamentary Secretary to the then Minister of Justice, A. F. Wijemanne, for a brief period of time in 1968. He appointed people to become Members of the Panel of Conciliators set in Agalawatta, Dandugamperuwa, and Palindanuwara.

== Death and legacy ==
Atapattu died at Tangalle on 14 December 1976, following a prolonged illness. K. B. Ratnayake, then the Minister of Parliamentary Affairs and Sports, moved the vote of condolence and gave sympathy in Parliament six days later.

D. P. Atapattu's son, Ranjit, was first elected to Parliament in 1977, representing the UNP in the Beliatta electorate. After resigning in 1983, Ranjit was appointed Minister for the Colombo Group of Hospitals, then became the Minister of Health from 1982 to 1989. He then served as the Minister of Labour and Social Welfare from 1989 to 1990.

== See also ==
- List of political families in Sri Lanka

== Sources ==
- Wijesinha, Sam (26 September 1999). "DP: A man who was one with the people". The Sunday Times (Sri Lanka). Archived from the original on 2 April 2008.
