= Ranjit Atapattu =

Sri Lankan physician and politician (1933–2018)

Hon. Dr Ranjit Atapattu

Minister of Health
- In office 1982–1989
- Preceded by: Siva Obeyesekere
- Succeeded by: Renuka Herath

Minister of Labour and Social Welfare
- In office 18 February 1989 – 5 January 1990
- Preceded by: C. P. J. Seneviratne
- Succeeded by: Dingiri Banda Wijetunga

Member of Parliament for Hambantota
- In office 9 March 1989 – 24 June 1994

Member of the Ceylon Parliament for Beliatta
- In office 1977–1989
- Preceded by: Mahinda Rajapaksa
- Succeeded by: seat abolished

Personal details
- Born: Ranjit Kanishka Parakrama Atapattu; 29 April 1933 Tangalle, Sri Lanka
- Died: 8 January 2018 (aged 84) Colombo
- Party: United National Party
- Spouse: Dreda
- Relations: D. P. Atapattu (father); Daya Dahanayake (mother); Indrani Atapattu (sister)
- Education: Royal College, Colombo, University of Ceylon
- Occupation: Politics
- Profession: Physician

Ranjith Kanishka Parakrama Atapattu (29 April 1933 – 8 January 2018) was a Sri Lankan physician and politician. He was the Minister of Health in Sri Lanka from 1982 to 1989 and Minister of Labour and Social Welfare from 1989 to 1990.

== Biography ==
Ranjith Kanishka Parakrama Atapattu was born on 29 April 1933 in Tangalle to Don Peter Atapattu and Daya Dahanayake. Don Peter was a Member of Parliament for the Beliatta electorate and Parliamentary Secretary to the Cabinet Minister of State. He had one sister, Indrani who married and migrated to Australia.

Between 1954 and 1960, Atapattu was educated at Royal College, Colombo and the University of Ceylon, where he obtained a Bachelor of Medicine and Bachelor of Surgery. Atapattu was employed as Medical Officer between 1960 and 1966, before establishing his own general medical practice.

Atapattu was first elected to parliament at the 8th parliamentary elections in July 1977, representing the United National Party in the Beliatta electorate, where he defeated the sitting member, Mahinda Rajapaksa, by over 6,000 votes. President J. R. Jayewardene, reluctant to give up the massive majority his party secured in 1977, held a referendum to cancel the 1983 parliamentary elections, and extend the life of the 1977 parliament until 1989. Jayewardene also decreed that all United National Party parliamentarians, whose electoral districts had not supported the referendum, would have to run in a by-election. Atapattu resigned from his seat on 10 February 1983, but was subsequently successful in the May 1983 by-elections, defeating Rajapaksa by nearly 3,000 votes.

Atapattu was appointed the Minister for Colombo Group of Hospitals (a project Ministry under the Ministry of Health) in August 1978. He was then appointed as the Minister of Health in the Jayewardene cabinet in 1982 and held the position until 1989. At the 1989 parliamentary elections, he ran as the United National Party candidate in the Hambantota electorate and was duly elected with 10,381 preference votes (18.35%), behind Rajapaksa's 13,073 preference votes (23.11%). On 18 February 1989, Atapattu was appointed Minister of Labour and Social Welfare as part of the Premadasa cabinet and held the position until 5 January 1990.

== See also ==
- List of political families in Sri Lanka
