= A. D. J. L. Leo =

Sri Lankan Ayurveda practitioner and politician

Akuruddaliyanage Don John Lazarus Leo (7 April 1922 – 6 August 2006) was a Sri Lankan Ayurveda practitioner and politician. He served as Member of Parliament from the Wattala.

Born to an Ayurveda practitioner, he had three sisters and a brother. He entered the Vidyalankara Pirivena in 1942 to study Sinhalese and Sanskrit and in 1944, he entered the Indigenous Medical College to study Ayurveda medicine. He graduated from the Medical University of Western Kolkata with a degree in 1948. On his return to Ceylon in 1949, he started his Ayurveda medical practice at Pamunugama.

Becoming an active member of the Sri Lanka Freedom Party, he became its Chief Organizer from 1960 to 1965. He contested the 1960 July general elections and the 1965 general elections from the Wattala electorate, but was defeated by the United National Party candidate Shelton Jayasinghe. He won the 1970 general elections and was to the House of Representatives from the Wattala electorate defeating Jayasinghe. Leo was defeated by Jayasinghe in the 1977 general elections.

He died at his home on 6 August 2006. He had four daughters and a son.
