= Tangalle Boys' School =

Tangalle National Boys' School

Location
- Tangalle; Sri Lanka

Information
- Type: National school
- Established: 31 October 1879; 145 years ago
- Grades: 6-13
- Gender: Boys

Tangalle National Boys' School was established in 1879 and is the oldest Christian missionary school in the Hambantota District. The school, which opened on 31 October 1879, was originally called Christ Church College. The first principal and administrator of the college was Rev. Father C. A. W. Jayasekara. Initially it was a boys college but later became a mixed school. In 1962 the school was taken over by the government and the name was changed to Tangalle Maha Vidyalaya. In 1994 it was renamed to Tangalle National Boys' School. The current principal is Sunil Mihindukula.
