= Beliatta Electoral District =

Electoral district of Sri Lanka

Beliatta electoral district was an electoral district of Sri Lanka between August 1947 and February 1989. The district was named after the town of Beliatta in Hambantota District, Southern Province. The 1978 Constitution of Sri Lanka introduced the proportional representation electoral system for electing members of Parliament. The existing 160 mainly single-member electoral districts were replaced with 22 multi-member electoral districts. Beliatta electoral district was replaced by the Hambantota multi-member electoral district at the 1989 general elections, the first under the proportional representation system.

== Members of Parliament ==
Key

Independent SLFP UNP

Election	Member	Party	Term
1947	D. A. Rajapaksa	United National Party	1947 - 1960
1952	D. A. Rajapaksa	Sri Lanka Freedom Party	1947 - 1960
1956	D. A. Rajapaksa	Sri Lanka Freedom Party	1947 - 1960
1960 (March)	D. P. Atapattu	United National Party	1960
1960 (July)	D. A. Rajapaksa	Sri Lanka Freedom Party	1960 - 1965
1965	D. P. Atapattu	United National Party	1965 - 1970
1970	Mahinda Rajapaksa	Sri Lanka Freedom Party	1970 - 1977
1977	Ranjit Atapattu	United National Party	1977 -1988

== Elections ==
=== 1947 Parliamentary General Election ===
Results of the 1st parliamentary election held between 23 August 1947 and 20 September 1947:

Candidate	Party	Symbol	Votes	%
D. A. Rajapaksa	United National Party	Hand	14,007	53.99
D. P. Atapattu		Chair	5,985	23.07
Eddie Fernando		Elephant	4,885	18.83
P. James de Silva		Star	362	1.40
P. D. S. Wickremasinghe		Key	270	1.04
Valid Votes			25,509	98.33
Rejected Votes			433	1.67
Total Polled			25,942	100.00
Registered Electors			41,570	
Turnout				62.41

=== 1952 Parliamentary General Election ===
Results of the 2nd parliamentary election held between 24 May 1952 and 30 May 1952:

Candidate	Party	Symbol	Votes	%
D. A. Rajapaksa	Sri Lanka Freedom Party	Umbrella	17,382	55.29
D. P. Atapattu	United National Party	Star	13,750	43.74
Valid Votes			31,132	99.03
Rejected Votes			304	0.97
Total Polled			31,436	100.00
Registered Electors			41,578	
Turnout				75.61

=== 1956 Parliamentary General Election ===
Results of the 3rd parliamentary election held between 5 April 1956 and 10 April 1956:

Candidate	Party	Symbol	Votes	%
D. A. Rajapaksa	Sri Lanka Freedom Party	Hand	26,215	71.14
D. P. Atapattu	United National Party	Elephant	10,382	28.17
Valid Votes			36,597	99.32
Rejected Votes			252	0.68
Total Polled			36,849	100.00
Registered Electors			49,456	
Turnout				74.51

=== 1960 (March) Parliamentary General Election ===
Results of the 4th parliamentary election held on 19 March 1960:

Candidate	Party	Symbol	Votes	%
D. P. Atapattu	United National Party	Elephant	14,379	49.74
D. A. Rajapaksa		Cartwheel	12,685	43.88
G. W. Sumathipala		Hand	439	1.52
T. H. Somadasa		Key	432	1.49
Wilfred Mathangaweera		Umbrella	354	1.22
D.L. Weeraratne		Star	298	1.03
Karunadasa Wickremanayaka		Lamp	125	0.43
Valid Votes			28,712	99.32
Rejected Votes			197	0.68
Total Polled			28,909	100.00
Registered Electors			35,992	
Turnout				80.32

=== 1960 (July) Parliamentary General Election ===
Results of the 5th parliamentary election held on 20 July 1960:

Candidate	Party	Symbol	Votes	%
D. A. Rajapaksa	Sri Lanka Freedom Party	Hand	15,121	51.57
D. P. Atapattu	United National Party	Elephant	14,074	48.00
Valid Votes			29,195	99.57
Rejected Votes			127	0.43
Total Polled			29,322	100.00
Registered Electors			35,992	
Turnout				81.47

=== 1965 Parliamentary General Election ===
Results of the 6th parliamentary election held on 22 March 1965:

Candidate	Party	Symbol	Votes	%
D. P. Atapattu	United National Party	Elephant	20,735	57.95
D. A. Rajapaksa	Sri Lanka Freedom Party	Hand	14,873	41.57
Valid Votes			35,608	99.52
Rejected Votes			171	0.48
Total Polled			35,779	100.00
Registered Electors			41,584	
Turnout				86.04

=== 1970 Parliamentary General Election ===
Results of the 7th parliamentary election held on 27 May 1970:

Candidate	Party	Symbol	Votes	%
Mahinda Rajapaksa	Sri Lanka Freedom Party	Hand	23,103	57.16
Ranjit Atapattu	United National Party	Elephant	16,477	40.76
Gunadasa Weerawarna Nilaweera		Ship	678	1.68
Valid Votes			40,258	99.60
Rejected Votes			163	0.40
Total Polled			40,421	100.00
Registered Electors			46,342	
Turnout				87.22

=== 1977 Parliamentary General Election ===
Results of the 8th parliamentary election held on 21 July 1977:

Candidate	Party	Symbol	Votes	%
Ranjit Atapattu	United National Party	Elephant	24,289	56.36
Mahinda Rajapaksa	Sri Lanka Freedom Party	Hand	17,896	41.52
Wimaladasa Jayawardana		Key	766	1.78
Valid Votes			42,951	99.66
Rejected Votes			147	0.34
Total Polled			43,098	100.00
Registered Electors			48,648	
Turnout				88.59
