= John Amaratunga =

Sri Lankan politician and lawyer

Hon. John Amaratunga
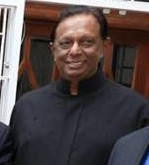

Minister of Tourism Development, Wildlife and Christian Religious Affairs
- In office 20 December 2018 – 21 November 2019
- President: Maithripala Sirisena
- Prime Minister: Ranil Wickremesinghe
- Preceded by: Wasantha Senanayake

Minister of Tourism Development and Christian Religious Affairs
- In office 4 September 2015 – 26 October 2018
- President: Maithripala Sirisena
- Prime Minister: Ranil Wickremesinghe
- Succeeded by: Wasantha Senanayake

Minister of Land
- In office 2 March 2016 – 2017
- President: Maithripala Sirisena
- Prime Minister: Ranil Wickremesinghe

Minister of Interior
- In office 2001–2003

Member of Parliament for Gampaha District
- In office 1989–2020

Personal details
- Born: 21 May 1940 (age 86)
- Party: United National Party
- Other political affiliations: United National Front
- Spouse: Hyacinth Amaratunga
- Occupation: Attorney-at-Law

John Anthony Emmanuel Amaratunga (Sinhala: ජෝන් ඇන්තනී එමානුවෙල් අමරතුංග) (born 21 May 1940) is a Sri Lankan politician and lawyer. He is a representative of Gampaha District for the United National Party in the Parliament of Sri Lanka. He resides in Kandana.He was the minister Tourism Development, Christian Religious Affairs and Land in the United National Party led government. He also held the powerful ministry of Interior in the 2001-2004 United National Party government.

== Early life ==
Educated at De Mazenod College, Kandana and at Saint Joseph's College, Colombo. He studied law at the Ceylon Law College and became a proctor in July 1966. He set up his legal practice in Negombo, becoming a Notary Public and a Justice of the Peace and Unofficial magistrate.

== Political career ==
Amaratunga joined the United National Party and became active in local politics. In 1978, while serving as chairman, Sri Lanka Leather Corporation; he succeeded Shelton Jayasinghe, Minister of Posts and Telecommunications as the Member of Parliament for the Wattala electorate following the sudden death of the later. He successfully held his seat in parliament in the successive elections from the Gampaha District. During his political career he held several appointments that included;

- Organizer of the United National Party for Wattala Electorate
- Chairman, Parliamentary Committee on Public Enterprises (1984-1993)
- Acting Minister of Finance (1988-1989)
- State Minister of Foreign Affairs (1989-1994)
- Subject Minister for Provincial Councils (1990)
- Acting State Minister for Information (1990)
- Acting State Minister for Defense (1992)
- Cabinet Minister of Home Affairs and Provincial Councils (1993-1994)
- Cabinet Minister of Interior and Christian Affairs (2001-2004)
- Chief Opposition Whip (2010-2015)
- Cabinet Minister of Public Order, Disaster Management & Christian Affairs (Jan – Mar 2015)
- Cabinet Minister of Public Order and Christian Religious Affairs (Mar 2015 – Aug 2015)
- Cabinet Minister of Tourism Development and Christian Religious Affairs (Since Sep 2015)
- Additional Ministerial Portfolio of Land (May 2016- Aug2017)
- Member of the Working Committee of the United National Party
- Chairman, United National Party Professional Group and Overseas Membership Development.
- President - Jathika Sevaka Sangamaya Trade Union
- Vice President World Tourism Organization - South Asia

== Controversy ==
=== Fraudulent acquisition of property ===
In 2018 John Amaratunga was accused of aiding the fraudulent acquisition of a property worth Rs. 2 Billion from an elderly couple, as well as holding them hostage. Eighty-six year-old Wimalsen Fernando and his wife Shiranie Fernando learnt that their property in Gregory's Road, Colombo was fraudulently acquired by a person named Prasad Deshapriya Vitharana of Kalubowila. When the property was visited by the couple they were held hostage by Amaratunga's guards. When the couple's lawyers attempted to enter the property they met Amaratunga in the property who used abusive language to threaten them and attempted to evict them; but the lawyers forced their way to the couple. The couple was threatened and Vitharana had extorted money from them with death threats. The couple complained to the Cinnamon Gardens police, but they did not see an inquiry for more than five months and no statement was taken from Amaratunga. When the media questioned the police they claimed to be "unaware" of the incident. John Amaratunga accepted that the accused was a friend but denied the allegations that he abused his powers to stop the investigations or that to threatening the lawyers. Instead he claimed he only asked them to leave calling them trespassers.
