= Nakulugamuwa =

Nakulugamuwa නාකුලුගමුව Nakulugam puraya (නාකුලුගම් පුරය)
- Village
- Location in Sri Lanka
- Coordinates: 6°00′N 80°42′E
- Country: Sri Lanka
- Province: Southern Province
- District: Hambantota District
- Town: Tangalle
- Established: antient

Government
  - Type: Tangalle Urban Council
- Elevation: 42 m (138 ft)

Population (2015)
  - Total: 1,914
- Time zone: UTC+05:30 (SLST)
- Postal code: 82300

Nakulugamuwa (Sinhala: නාකුලුගමුව) is a village in the Hambantota District, Southern Province, Sri Lanka, Sri Lanka. It is located on the Tangalla Road (A2 Highway).

Nakulugamuwa is a comparatively highly populated village in Tangalle. Churches, Buddhist temples, Hindu temples, mosques, schools of various types and many private shops and establishments are spread throughout the area. Though it is a majority Roman Catholic and Buddhist area, people of many faiths live here in peaceful coexistence. A sizable population also exists of minority Tamils and a smaller percentage of Muslims. There has been no record of any violence used by one faith group or racial group against another.

A railway station for Nakulugamuwa was opened on 4 September 2022.

== Landmarks and notable places ==
=== Educational establishments ===
- Nakulugamuwa Gamini Maha Vidyalaya
- Nakulugamuwa Primary School
- Rambukketiya Maha Vidyalaya

=== Medical establishments ===
- Polycare Private Medical Center
- Nakulugamuwa Divisional Hospital

=== Religious establishments ===
- Wewdatta Temple
- Rambukketiya Viharaya
- Wallawatta Jayatilakaramaya
- Sri Vimalananda Dhaham Pasala

=== Public places ===
- Nakulugamuwa Railway Station
- Miriswatta Water Tank
- Nakulugamuwa Post Office
