= Ministry of Mass Media =

Government ministry of Sri Lanka

- ‍ජනමාධ්‍ය අමාත්‍යාංශය வெகுசன ஊடக அமைச்சு

Ministry overview
- Formed: 26 September 1947; 78 years ago (as Ministry of Posts and Telecommunications)
- Preceding Ministry: Ministry of Communications and Works
- Jurisdiction: Government of Sri Lanka
- Headquarters: Floors 6 & 8, Postal Headquarters Building, 310 D. R. Wijewardena mawatha Colombo 10; 6.927887°N 79.857956°E
- Annual budget: LKR 12 billion (2016, recurrent); LKR 0.2 billion (2016, capital)
- Minister responsible: Hon. Nalinda Jayatissa, Minister of Mass Media
- Ministry executives: W.A. Chulananda Perera, Secretary; Prof. Sunanda Maddumabandara, State Secretary
- Child Ministry: Sri Lanka Post
- Key documents: Post Office Ordinance, No. 11 of 1908; Stamp Ordinance, No. 22 of 1909
- Website: www.media.gov.lk

The Ministry of Mass Media (Sinhala: ජනමාධ්‍ය අමාත්‍යාංශය; Tamil: வெகுசன ஊடக அமைச்சு) is a cabinet ministry of the Government of Sri Lanka responsible for the implementation of the Post Office Ordinance and the Stamp Ordinance of Sri Lanka. Aside from broader policy formulation, this also includes the maintenance and expansion of the Sri Lanka postal service, the design, release, sale and archiving of the country's postage stamps, representing Sri Lanka's interests at the Universal Postal Union, the oversight of banking, insurance and wire transfer services provided at postal offices.

The current Minister of Mass Media is Nalinda Jayatissa. The ministry's secretary is W.A. Chulananda Perera.

== Ministers ==
Parties

Sri Lanka Freedom Party United National Party Sri Lanka Podujana Peramuna

Ministers of Posts
Name	Portrait	Party	Took office	Left office	Head of government	Ministerial title	Refs
Mohamed Macan Markar			1931	1936		Minister of Communications and Works	
John Kotelawala			1936	1945		Minister of Communications and Works	
C. Sittampalam		Independent	26 September 1947		D. S. Senanayake	Minister of Posts and Telecommunication	
C. Sittampalam		Independent		1952	Dudley Senanayake	Minister of Posts and Telecommunication	
V. Nalliah		United National Party	19 June 1952	12 July 1952	Dudley Senanayake	Minister of Posts and Information	
S. Natesan		United National Party	1952		Dudley Senanayake	Minister of Posts and Information	
S. Natesan		United National Party		19 January 1956	John Kotelawala	Minister of Posts and Information	
C. A. S. Marikar		Sri Lanka Freedom Party	12 April 1956		S. W. R. D. Bandaranaike	Minister of Posts, Broadcasting and Information	
C. A. S. Marikar		Sri Lanka Freedom Party			W. Dahanayake	Minister of Posts, Broadcasting and Information	
Montague Jayawickrama		United National Party	23 March 1960	1960	Dudley Senanayake	Minister of Posts, Works and Power	
M. P. de Z. Sriwardene			28 May 1963		Sirimavo Bandaranaike	Minister of Public Works and Post	
J. A. Amaratunga		United National Party	1969	1970	Dudley Senanayake	Minister of Information and Broadcasting	
Chelliah Kumarasuriar			31 May 1970		Sirimavo Bandaranaike	Minister of Posts and Telecommunications	
Shelton Jayasinghe		United National Party	23 July 1977		J. R. Jayewardene	Minister of Posts and Telecommunications	
D. B. Wijetunga		United National Party			J. R. Jayewardene	Minister of Posts and Telecommunications	
Alick Aluwihare		United National Party	18 February 1989	14 March 1991	Ranasinghe Premadasa	Minister of Posts and Telecommunications	
A. M. S. Adhikari		United National Party	14 March 1991		Ranasinghe Premadasa	Minister of Posts and Telecommunications	
Mangala Samaraweera		Sri Lanka Freedom Party	19 August 1994		D. B. Wijetunga	Minister of Posts and Telecommunications	
Nimal Siripala de Silva		Sri Lanka Freedom Party	19 October 2000		Chandrika Kumaratunga	Minister of Posts and Telecommunications	
Indika Gunawardena		Sri Lanka Freedom Party	14 September 2001		Chandrika Kumaratunga	Minister of Posts and Telecommunications	
D. M. Jayaratne		Sri Lanka Freedom Party	10 April 2004		Chandrika Kumaratunga	Minister of Post, Telecommunications and Udarata Development	
D. M. Jayaratne		Sri Lanka Freedom Party	23 November 2005		Mahinda Rajapaksa	Minister of Posts and Telecommunication	
Rauff Hakeem		Sri Lanka Muslim Congress	28 January 2007	December 2007	Mahinda Rajapaksa	Minister of Posts and Telecommunication	
Jeewan Kumaranatunga		Sri Lanka Freedom Party	23 April 2010		Mahinda Rajapaksa	Minister of Posts and Telecommunication	
Jeewan Kumaranatunga		Sri Lanka Freedom Party	22 November 2010		Mahinda Rajapaksa	Minister of Postal Services	
M. H. A. Haleem		United National Party	21 January 2015	17 August 2015	Maithripala Sirisena	Minister of Muslim Religious Affairs and Posts	
M. H. A. Haleem		United National Party	4 September 2015	22 November 2019	Maithripala Sirisena	Minister of Posts, Postal Service and Muslim Affairs	
Bandula Gunawardane		Sri Lanka Podujana Peramuna	22 November 2019	17 January 2020	Gotabaya Rajapaksa	Minister of Information and Communication Technology	
Bandula Gunawardane		Sri Lanka Podujana Peramuna	17 January 2020		Gotabaya Rajapaksa	Minister of Information and Mass Media	
Bandula Gunawardane		Sri Lanka Podujana Peramuna	23 May 2022	Present	Gotabaya Rajapaksa	Minister of Mass Media	

== Secretaries ==
Posts Secretaries
Name	Took office	Left office	Title	Refs
Asoka Jayasekara	25 April 2010		Posts and Telecommunication Secretary	
Asoka Jayasekara	22 November 2010		Postal Services Secretary	
Abdul Majeed	19 January 2015		Muslim Religious Affairs and Posts Secretary	
P. H. L. Wimalasiri Perera	8 September 2015		Postal, Postal Services and Muslim Religious Affairs Secretary	
D. G. M. V. Hapuarachchi	1 August 2016	27 November 2019	Postal, Postal Services and Muslim Religious Affairs Secretary	
W.A. Chulananda Perera	27 November 2019	Present	Information and Mass Media Secretary	

== See also ==
- Demographics of Sri Lanka
- Sri Lanka Post
