= Ministry of Ports and Aviation (Sri Lanka) =

Government ministry of Sri Lanka

The Ministry of Ports and Aviation is Sri Lanka's organization responsible for the development and operation of the country's shipping, port and aviation activities.

== Overview ==
The organization was founded in 2004. It is responsible for supervising the organizations activities, developing national policy, and participating in development of laws to support the industries.
