= Tangalle Urban Council =

Sri Lankan local authority

Type
- Type: Local authority

Leadership
- Chairman: Nandasiri Palliyaguruge, NPP since 6 May 2025

Structure
- Seats: 19
- Political groups: Government (9): NPP (9); Opposition (10): SJB (5); SLPP (3); UNP (1); SB (1)

Elections
- Last election: 2025
- Next election: TBA

Tangalle Urban Council (TUC) is the local authority for the town of Tangalle in the Hambantota District, Southern Province, Sri Lanka. The TUC is responsible for providing a variety of local public services including roads, sanitation, drains, housing, libraries, public parks and recreational facilities. It has 9 councillors elected using an open list proportional representation system.

== Election results ==
=== 2025 local government election ===
Results of the local government election held on 6 May 2025.

Party	Votes	%	Seats
National People's Power	2,260	46.18%	9
Samagi Jana Balawegaya	1,397	28.55%	5
Sri Lanka Podujana Peramuna	795	16.24%	3
United National Party	265	5.41%	1
Sarvajana Balaya	177	3.62%	1
Total	4,894	100.00%	19
Valid votes	4,894	98.08%	
Rejected votes	96	1.92%	
Total votes	4,990	100.00%	
Registered electors/turnout	7,105	70.23%	

=== 2018 local government election ===
Results of the local government election held on 10 February 2018.

Party	Votes	%	Seats
Sri Lanka Podujana Peramuna	2,248	39.61%	7
United National Party	2,136	37.63%	7
United People's Freedom Alliance	757	13.34%	2
Janatha Vimukthi Peramuna	535	9.43%	2
Total	5,676	100.00%	18
Valid votes	5,676	98.70%	
Rejected votes	75	1.30%	
Total votes	5,751	100.00%	
Registered electors/turnout	6,808	84.47%	

=== 2011 local government election ===
Results of the local government election held on 17 March 2011.

Party	Votes	%	Seats
United People's Freedom Alliance (Note: National Congress, All Ceylon Muslim Congress, Sri Lanka Freedom Party et al.)	2,389	48.73%	6
United National Party	2,289	46.69%	3
Janatha Vimukthi Peramuna	221	4.51%	0
Independent Group 2	4	0.08%	0
Independent Group 1	0	0.00%	0
Total	4,903	100.00%	9
Valid votes	4,903	97.83%	
Rejected votes	109	2.17%	
Total votes	5,012	100.00%	
Registered electors/turnout	6,433	77.91%	

=== 2006 local government election ===
Party	Votes	%	Seats
United People's Freedom Alliance	2,578	50.27%	5
United National Party	2,028	39.55%	3
Janatha Vimukthi Peramuna	514	10.02%	2
Independent Group 2	3	0.06%	0
Independent Group 4	2	0.04%	0
Independent Group 3	2	0.04%	0
Independent Group 1	1	0.02%	0
Total	5,128	100.00%	9
Valid votes	5,128	96.70%	
Rejected votes	175	3.30%	
Total votes	5,303	100.00%	
Registered electors/turnout	6,959	76.20%	

=== 2002 local government election ===
Results of the local government election held on 20 May 2002.

Party	Votes	%	Seats
United National Party	3,357	62.54%	6
Janatha Vimukthi Peramuna	2,003	37.31%	3
Independent Group 1	4	0.07%	0
Independent Group 2	4	0.07%	0
Total	5,368	100.00%	9
Valid votes	5,368	96.37%	
Rejected votes	202	3.63%	
Total votes	5,570	100.00%	
Registered electors/turnout	6,952	80.12%	
