= Minister of State (Ceylon) =

The Minister of State was a cabinet ministry of the Government of Ceylon that existed from 25 March 1965 to 29 May 1970 during the third Dudley Senanayake cabinet. The ministry was considered as the senior most cabinet minister, following after the prime minister.

J. R. Jayewardene, who had held senior cabinet positions such as the first Minister of Finance, was appointed as Minister of State with the formation of the national government in March 1965. As Minister of State, Jayewardene focused on economic development and managing the foreign exchange shortages faced by Ceylon with large ministry budget allocation. In order to attract tourists, he focused on promoting tourism in Ceylon.

In 1966, Jayewardene established the Ceylon Hotels Corporation with the Ceylon Hotels Corporation Act of 1966, and the Ceylon Tourist Board with the Ceylon Tourist Board Act No. 10 of 1966. D. P. Atapattu served as Parliamentary Secretary to the Minister of State and Anandatissa de Alwis served as the Permanent Secretary. The ministry was located at 54, Chalizns Street, Colombo 1.

== Departments ==
- Government Printer
- Department of Control of Imports and Exports
- Department of National Archives
- Department of Wild Life
- Zoological Gardens
- Ceylon Hotels Corporation
- Ceylon Tourist Board

== See also ==
- Minister for Internal Security (Ceylon)
