= Wattala Electoral District =

Electoral district of Sri Lanka (1960-89)

Wattala electoral district was an electoral district of Sri Lanka between March 1960 and February 1989. The district was named after the town of Wattala in Gampaha District, Western Province. The 1978 Constitution of Sri Lanka introduced the proportional representation electoral system for electing members of Parliament. The existing 160 mainly single-member electoral districts were replaced with 22 multi-member electoral districts. Wattala electoral district was replaced by the Gampaha multi-member electoral district at the 1989 general elections.

== Members of Parliament ==
Key

Independent SLFP UNP

Election	Member	Party	Term
1960 (March)	D. Shelton Jayasinghe	United National Party	1960 - 1970
1960 (July)	D. Shelton Jayasinghe	United National Party	1960 - 1970
1965	D. Shelton Jayasinghe	United National Party	1960 - 1970
1970	A. D. J. L. Leo	Sri Lanka Freedom Party	1970 - 1977
1977	D. Shelton Jayasinghe	United National Party	1977 - 1989

== Elections ==
=== 1960 (March) Parliamentary General Election ===
Results of the 4th parliamentary election held on 19 March 1960 for the district:

Candidate	Party	Symbol	Votes	%
D. Shelton Jayasinghe	United National Party	Elephant	9,665	40.03
D. J. Weerackody		Hand	5,520	22.86
Stanley Mendis		Key	3,198	13.24
Vincent Rajapaksa		Tumbler	2,941	12.18
C. M. Jayawardena		Umbrella	1,681	6.96
L. Wewala Panditha		Star	571	2.36
A. S. Jayamaha		Cockerel	220	0.91
K. G. Jayaweera		Lamp	147	0.61
Valid Votes			23,943	99.16
Rejected Votes			203	0.84
Total Polled			24,146	100.00
Registered Electors			30,201	
Turnout				79.95

=== 1960 (July) Parliamentary General Election ===
Results of the 5th parliamentary election held on 20 July 1960 for the district:

Candidate	Party	Symbol	Votes	%
D. Shelton Jayasinghe	United National Party	Elephant	11,633	49.27
A. D. J. L. Leo	Sri Lanka Freedom Party	Hand	11,529	48.83
W. S. Perera		Cartwheel	287	1.22
D. J. Weerackody		Butterfly	94	0.40
Valid Votes			23,543	99.71
Rejected Votes			68	0.29
Total Polled			23,611	100.00
Registered Electors			30,201	
Turnout				78.18

=== 1965 Parliamentary General Election ===
Results of the 6th parliamentary election held on 22 March 1965 for the district:

Candidate	Party	Symbol	Votes	%
D. Shelton Jayasinghe	United National Party	Elephant	17,649	54.77
A. D. J. L. Leo	Sri Lanka Freedom Party	Hand	14,076	43.69
D. G. B. Joseph		Cartwheel	184	0.57
Valid Votes			31,909	99.03
Rejected Votes			312	0.97
Total Polled			32,221	100.00
Registered Electors			38,456	
Turnout				83.79

=== 1970 Parliamentary General Election ===
Results of the 7th parliamentary election held on 27 May 1970 for the district:

Candidate	Party	Symbol	Votes	%
A. D. J. L. Leo	Sri Lanka Freedom Party	Hand	21,856	52.50
D. Shelton Jayasinghe	United National Party	Elephant	19,667	47.24
Valid Votes			41,523	99.75
Rejected Votes			106	0.25
Total Polled			41,629	100.00
Registered Electors			48,875	
Turnout				85.17

=== 1977 Parliamentary General Election ===
Results of the 8th parliamentary election held on 21 July 1977 for the district:

Candidate	Party	Symbol	Votes	%
D. Shelton Jayasinghe	United National Party	Elephant	26,355	62.77
A. D. J. L. Leo	Sri Lanka Freedom Party	Hand	14,677	34.95
D. J. R. J. Jayakody		Key	625	1.49
Nelson Fernando		Flower	208	0.50
B. J. M. Rodrigo		Ship	32	0.08
Valid Votes			41,897	99.78
Rejected Votes			92	0.22
Total Polled			41,989	100.00
Registered Electors			48,749	
Turnout				86.13
