= J. A. Amaratunga =

Member of Sri Lanka Senate

J. A. Amaratunga MBE JP

Personal details
- Born: John Arthur Amaratunga; 1911
- Died: 1996 (aged 84–85)
- Occupation: Politician

John Arthur Amaratunga was a Ceylonese politician. He was the Minister of Information and Broadcasting and Parliamentary Secretary to the Minister of Planning and Economic Affairs (which was under the Prime Minister) in the Third Dudley Senanayake cabinet and an appointed member of the Senate of Ceylon from the United National Party. A close confidant of Dudley Senanayake, in the 1950s he served as member of the Gal Oya Development Board and was appointed a Member of the Order of the British Empire (MBE) in the 1951 Birthday Honours.. Also, in recognition of his service to the nation, he was awarded the prestigious Deshabandhu national honour by the Government of Sri Lanka in 1990 ]].
