= Dilanthi Amaratunga =

Sri Lankan scientist

Dilanthi Amaratunga FRGS
- Born: Panadura, Sri Lanka
- Education: Visakha Vidyalaya; University of Moratuwa (BSc); University of Salford (PhD)
- Occupations: Scientist, quantity surveyor, academic
- Years active: 1993–present
- Employer(s): University of Huddersfield; Formerly University of Salford
- Awards: Newton Prize for Indonesia (2019)

Dilanthi Amaratunga is a Sri Lankan scientist. She is a quantity surveyor who leads research and international projects into disaster mitigation, reconstruction and resilience.

== Early life and education ==
Amaratunga was born in Sri Lanka, spending her early life in Panadura. She went to Visakha Vidyalaya a girls school, for secondary education. In 1993 she graduated with a B.Sc. in Quantity Surveying (First Class Hons) from the Department of Building Economics, University of Moratuwa. She was awarded a PhD for a study of ‘Theory Building in Facilities Management Performance Measurement: Application of Core Performance Measurement and Management Principles’ in 2001 from the Research Institute for the Built and Human Environment, at the University of Salford, UK.

== Career ==
Amaratunga is an academic, holding Professorial positions at the Universities of Salford (2006-2014) and Huddersfield (2014-) in the UK. She was appointed Professor of Disaster Management at Salford in 2006. Between 2009 and 2014 Amaratunga was Head of the Centre for Disaster Resilience and the Associate Head of School (International) of the Built Environment. In 2014 she joined the University of Huddersfield as Professor of Disaster Risk Reduction and Management and Co-Head of the Global Disaster Resilience Centre.

Amaratunga has specialist knowledge, and engages international collaborations and advocacy of diversity and inclusion in academia. She has collaborated with 288 research partners, including governments, non-governmental organisations (NGOs) and communities, in 57 countries. For example, between 2012 and 2015, she co-led a three year, European funded project, called the Academic Network for Disaster Resilience to Optimise Educational Development (ANDROID). Albert, Amartunga & Haigh (2018) review of compensation policies and practice for environmental damage from oil spillages in Nigeria is cited by the National Oil Spill Detection and Response Agency.

In 2018, Amaratunga co-led the inaugural symposium of the Frontiers of Development programme set up by The Royal Academy of Engineering, The Academy of Medical Sciences, The British Academy and The Royal Society. The symposium was held in Kigali, Rwanda. It was attended by early and mid-career, interdisciplinary researchers who considered the challenges caused by global mass displacement.

Amaratunga was co-project lead and recipient of the 2019 Newton Prize for Indonesia, with Harkunti Rahayu from Institut Teknologi Bandung and Richard Haigh from the University of Huddersfield. Their research influenced approaches to assessing tsunami preparedness and priorities for capacity development of member states of the Intergovernmental Coordination Group for the Indian Ocean Tsunami Warning and the Intergovernmental Oceanographic Commission of UNESCO.

She is an expert on the Register for the Women's Resilience to Disasters (WRD) programme which aims to encourage countries to adopt gender-responsive decision-making and governance systems to disasters. Amaratunga is on the steering committee of the UK Alliance for Disaster Research, a group representing disaster research at governmental level.

In 2010, she co-founded the International Journal of Disaster Resilience in the Built Environment with Richard Haigh and remains co-editor.

Amaratunga is a Fellow of the Royal Institution of Chartered Surveyors (RICS); Fellow of the Royal Geographical Society, UK; Fellow of the Higher Education Academy, UK; and Fellow/Chartered Manager of the Chartered Management Institute, UK.

== Publications ==
In 2021 Amaratunga was one of the top 2% Global scientists in World Critical Science Disciplines on a citation analysis by Elsevier BV Netherlands and Stanford University. Her research output includes 98 articles, 34 chapters, 31 conference articles, 66 more (including 23 commissioned reports and 3 books) and 112 conference contributions.

=== Books ===
- Post-disaster reconstruction of the built environment: rebuilding for resilience
- Multi-hazard early warning and disaster risks
- Rebuilding communities after displacement: sustainable and resilience approaches
