= Ministry of Health (Sri Lanka) =

Government ministry of Sri Lanka

- සෞඛ්‍ය අමාත්‍යාංශය சுகாதார அமைச்சு

Ministry overview
- Formed: 1931; 95 years ago
- Jurisdiction: Government of Sri Lanka
- Headquarters: 385 Ven. Baddegama Wimalawansa Thero Mawatha, Maradana, Colombo; 6°55′12.40″N 79°51′54.60″E
- Employees: ▲150,273 (2020)
- Annual budget: ▲LKR 604 billion (2025) ▲(6.7% of GDP)
- Minister responsible: Nalinda Jayatissa, Minister of Health
- Child agencies: List; Ayurvedic Medical Council; Department of Ayurveda; Department of Health Services; Medical Research Institute; National Authority on Tobacco and Alcohol; National Health Council; National Health Development Fund; National Institute of Health Science; National Institute of Nephrology, Dialysis and Transplantation; Private Medical Institute Council; Sri Lanka Ayurvedic Drugs Corporation; Sri Lanka Medical Council; Sri Lanka Thriposha Limited; State Pharmaceuticals Corporation; State Pharmaceuticals Manufacturing Corporation
- Website: health.gov.lk

Map
- Location in Colombo District

The Ministry of Health (Sinhala: සෞඛ්‍ය අමාත්‍යාංශය, romanized: Saukhya Amāthyānshaya; Tamil: சுகாதார அமைச்சு, romanized: Cukātāra Amaiccu) is the central government ministry of Sri Lanka responsible for health. The ministry is responsible for formulating and implementing national policy on health, nutrition, indigenous medicine and other subjects which come under its purview.

Provincial councils are constitutionally responsible for operating the majority of the Sri Lanka's public hospitals but some, known as line ministry hospitals, come under the direct control of the central government in Colombo. As of 2016 there were 47 line ministry hospitals (including all of the country's teaching hospitals), accounting for 47% (36,000) of all public hospital beds in the country.

The current Minister of Health portfolio is held by Dr Nalinda Jayatissa.

== Ministers ==
The Minister of Health, Nutrition and Indigenous Medicine is a member of the Cabinet of Sri Lanka.

Parties

Governors of British Ceylon United National Party Sri Lanka Freedom Party Viplavakari Lanka Sama Samaja Party Eelam People's Democratic Party Sri Lanka Podujana Peramuna National People's Power

Ministers of Health
Name	Portrait	Party	Took office	Left office	Head of government	Ministerial title	Refs
T. B. Panabokke			1931	1931		Minister of Health	
W. A. de Silva			1936	1946		Minister of Health	
S. W. R. D. Bandaranaike		United National Party	26 September 1947	12 July 1951	D. S. Senanayake	Minister of Health and Local Government	
Dudley Senanayake		United National Party	1952		Dudley Senanayake	Minister of Health and Local Government	
E. A. Nugawela					Dudley Senanayake	Minister of Health	
E. A. Nugawela					John Kotelawala	Minister of Health	
Vimala Wijewardene		Sri Lanka Freedom Party	12 April 1956	June 1959	S. W. R. D. Bandaranaike	Minister of Health	
A. P. Jayasuriya			26 September 1959	8 December 1959	W. Dahanayake	Minister of Health	
M. V. P. Peiris			23 March 1960	1960	Dudley Senanayake	Minister of Health and Social Services	
A. P. Jayasuriya			23 July 1960		Sirimavo Bandaranaike	Minister of Health	
Badi-ud-din Mahmud			28 May 1963		Sirimavo Bandaranaike	Minister of Health and Housing	
M. D. H. Jayawardena		United National Party			Dudley Senanayake	Minister of Health	
George Rajapaksa		Sri Lanka Freedom Party			Sirimavo Bandaranaike	Minister of Health	
Siva Obeyesekere		Sri Lanka Freedom Party	1976	1977	Sirimavo Bandaranaike	Minister of Health	
Ranjit Atapattu		United National Party	1982	1989	J. R. Jayewardene	Minister of Health	
Sunethra Ranasinghe		United National Party	1983	1985	J. R. Jayewardene	Minister of Health	
Sunethra Ranasinghe		United National Party	1985	1989	J. R. Jayewardene	Minister of Women's Affairs and Teaching Hospitals	
Renuka Herath		United National Party	1989	1994	Ranasinghe Premadasa	Minister of Health and Women's Affairs	
A. H. M. Fowzie		Sri Lanka Freedom Party	1994		D. B. Wijetunga	Minister of Health and Social Services	
A. H. M. Fowzie		Sri Lanka Freedom Party			Chandrika Kumaratunga	Minister of Health, Highways and Social Services	
John Seneviratne		Sri Lanka Freedom Party	19 October 2000		Chandrika Kumaratunga	Minister of Health	
P. Dayaratna		United National Party	12 December 2001		Chandrika Kumaratunga	Minister of Health, Nutrition and Welfare	
Nimal Siripala de Silva		Sri Lanka Freedom Party	14 September 2001	10 April 2004	Chandrika Kumaratunga	Minister of Health, Indigenous Medicine and Social Services	
Nimal Siripala de Silva		Sri Lanka Freedom Party	10 April 2004	23 November 2005	Chandrika Kumaratunga	Minister of Healthcare, Nutrition and Uva-Wellassa Development	
Nimal Siripala de Silva		Sri Lanka Freedom Party	23 November 2005	23 April 2010	Mahinda Rajapaksa	Minister of Healthcare and Nutrition	
Maithripala Sirisena		Sri Lanka Freedom Party	23 April 2010	21 November 2014	Mahinda Rajapaksa	Minister of Health	
Tissa Attanayake		United National Party	11 December 2014	12 January 2015	Mahinda Rajapaksa	Minister of Health	
Rajitha Senaratne		Sri Lanka Freedom Party	12 January 2015	17 August 2015	Maithripala Sirisena	Minister of Health and Indigenous Medicine	
Rajitha Senaratne		United National Party	4 September 2015	21 November 2019	Maithripala Sirisena	Minister of Health, Nutrition and Indigenous Medicine	
Pavithra Devi Wanniarachchi		Sri Lanka Freedom Party	22 November 2019	12 August 2020	Gotabaya Rajapaksa	Minister of Healthcare and Indigenous Medical Services	
Pavithra Devi Wanniarachchi		Sri Lanka Podujana Peramuna	12 August 2020	18 April 2022	Gotabaya Rajapaksa	Minister of Health	
Channa Jayasumana		Sri Lanka Podujana Peramuna	18 April 2022	9 May 2022	Gotabaya Rajapaksa	Minister of Health	
Keheliya Rambukwella		Sri Lanka Podujana Peramuna	23 May 2022	22 July 2022	Gotabaya Rajapaksa	Minister of Health	
Keheliya Rambukwella		Sri Lanka Podujana Peramuna	22 July 2022	23 October 2023	Ranil Wickremesinghe	Minister of Health and Water Supply	
Ramesh Pathirana		Sri Lanka Podujana Peramuna	23 October 2023	24 September 2024	Ranil Wickremesinghe	Minister of Health	
Harini Amarasuriya		National People's Power	24 September 2024	18 November 2024	Anura Kumara Dissanayake	Minister of Health	
Nalinda Jayatissa		National People's Power	18 November 2024	Incumbent	Anura Kumara Dissanayake	Minister of Health and Mass Media	

== Secretaries ==
Health Secretaries
Name	Took office	Left office	Title	Refs
T. R. C. Ruberu	25 April 2010		Health Secretary	
Y. D. Nihal Jayathilaka	12 July 2012		Health Secretary	
W. Sudharma Karunaratne	29 May 2014		Health Secretary	
D. M. R. B. Dissanayake	19 January 2015		Health and Indigenous Medicine Secretary	
Upali Marasinghe	8 September 2015		Health, Nutrition and Indigenous Medicine Secretary	
P. H. J. B. Sugathadasa	16 June 2017		Health, Nutrition and Indigenous Medicine Secretary	
