= Tangalle =

Tangalle තංගල්ල தங்காலை
- Town
- Location within Sri Lanka
- Coordinates: 6°01′N 80°47′E
- Country: Sri Lanka
- Province: Southern Province
- District: Hambantota

Government
  - Type: Tangalle Municipal Council
  - Mayor: W. P. Ariyadasa
  - Headquarters: Tangalle Town Hall

Population (2012)
  - Total: 72,500
- Time zone: UTC+5:30 (Sri Lanka Standard Time Zone)
  - Summer (DST): UTC+6 (Summer time)
- Postal Code: 82200
- Area Code: 047

Tangalle (Sinhala තංගල්ල [ˈtaŋɡalːə], Tamil: தங்காலை) (also known as Tangalla) is a large town in Hambantota District, Southern Province, Sri Lanka, governed by an Urban Council. It is one of the largest towns in southern province. It is located 195 km (121 mi) south of Colombo and 35 km (22 mi) east of Matara. It has a mild climate, in comparison to the rest of the district, and sandy beaches.

Tangalle is a regionally important fishing port, situated on one of the largest bays in Sri Lanka, which is protected from the ocean by an enclosing reef. It is a centre of tourism and a popular holiday destination on the south coast. In the town centre there is an old Dutch fort which is used as a prison today. The Dutch and subsequently the British used Tangalle as an important anchorage on the southern coast of the island. The Dutch Fort, Rest House and Court House are a few remaining examples of Dutch architecture in Tangalle.

Religion in Tangalle DS Division (2012)
1. Buddhist (97.7%)
2. Hindu (0.16%)
3. Muslim (1.36%)
4. Roman Catholic (0.35%)
5. Other Christian (0.40%)
6. Other (0.01%)

== Etymology ==
The name of the town in Sinhala means "projected rock", a reference to the rocks which form the coastline in the town area, which contrasts with the sandy beach of the surrounding areas. Another rationale is that the name is derived from ran-gala or "golden rock", which relates to a local legend that a holy man once ate a meal there and the rock was turned to gold.

== Attractions ==
- The Mulkirigala Raja Maha Vihara is ( also known as Mulkirigala Rock Temple) 20 km (12 mi) north of the town. The temple is perched on a boulder approximately 200 m (660 ft) high. According to ancient inscriptions carved on the rock, Mulkirigala dates back almost 2,000 years when it was a site of a Buddhist monastery. The temple complex consists of ancient murals, a recumbent Buddha statue, devalayas, and several cave temples all of which are found at different levels while ascending the peak of the rock. One of the caves houses a library in which, a most important discovery was made in 1826 by a British administrator, George Turnour, who found a number of olas (palm-leaf manuscripts) containing the key to translating the Mahawamsa, the 'Great Chronicle of Sri Lanka'. Turnour's discovery of the tika, or commentary, made it possible for the Mahawamsa to be translated from Pali first into English and then into Sinhala, this translation then enabled scholars to study the history of the island from 543BC to comparatively modern times.
- The Parewella Natural Swimming Area, is located 0.9 km (0.56 mi) from Tangalle town center.
- Hummanaya blowhole, is located 11.2 km (7.0 mi) north of the town in the fishing village of Kudawella. It is the only blowhole in Sri Lanka.
- Kalametiya Bird Sanctuary is 24 km (15 mi) east of the town. The Kalametiya Bird Sanctuary was declared a wildlife sanctuary in 1938, originally with 2,500 hectares but was abolished in 1946 due to the opposition by local residents. It was once again declared a sanctuary in 1984 but with a considerably reduced area. The Kalametiya Bird Sanctuary is an area of coastal lagoons and mangroves, which is rich in marine and home to four nationally threatened birds: Indian Reef Heron (Egretta gularis); Glossy Ibis (Plegadis falcinellus); Black-capped Purple Kingfisher (Halcyon pileata); Sri Lankan Junglefowl (Gallus lafayettii), as well as other birdlife and reptiles, a large number of which are nationally and globally threatened.
- Turtle Watch Rekawa is 10 km (6.2 mi) east of the town. At the beach you can watch five species of marine turtles: Green turtles, Loggerhead turtles, Leatherback turtles, Olive Ridley turtles and Hawksbill turtles laying their eggs in the sand nests at night. The Turtle Conservation Project that conducts a 'turtle watch' programme, which protects the nesting sites until the hatchlings return to the ocean.

== Education ==
=== Universities ===
- Ocean University of Sri Lanka
- Sri Lanka Institute of Advanced Technological Education

=== Schools ===
- Tangalle Boys' School, established in 1879.
- Tangalle Girls' School, established in 1972.
- Ruhunu Vijayaba National College
- Leeds International School
- Tangalle Primary School
- Tangalle Model Primary School
- Nakulugamuwa Gamini Maha Vidyalaya
- Rahula Maha Vidyalaya
- Polommaruwa Model School

== Gallery ==
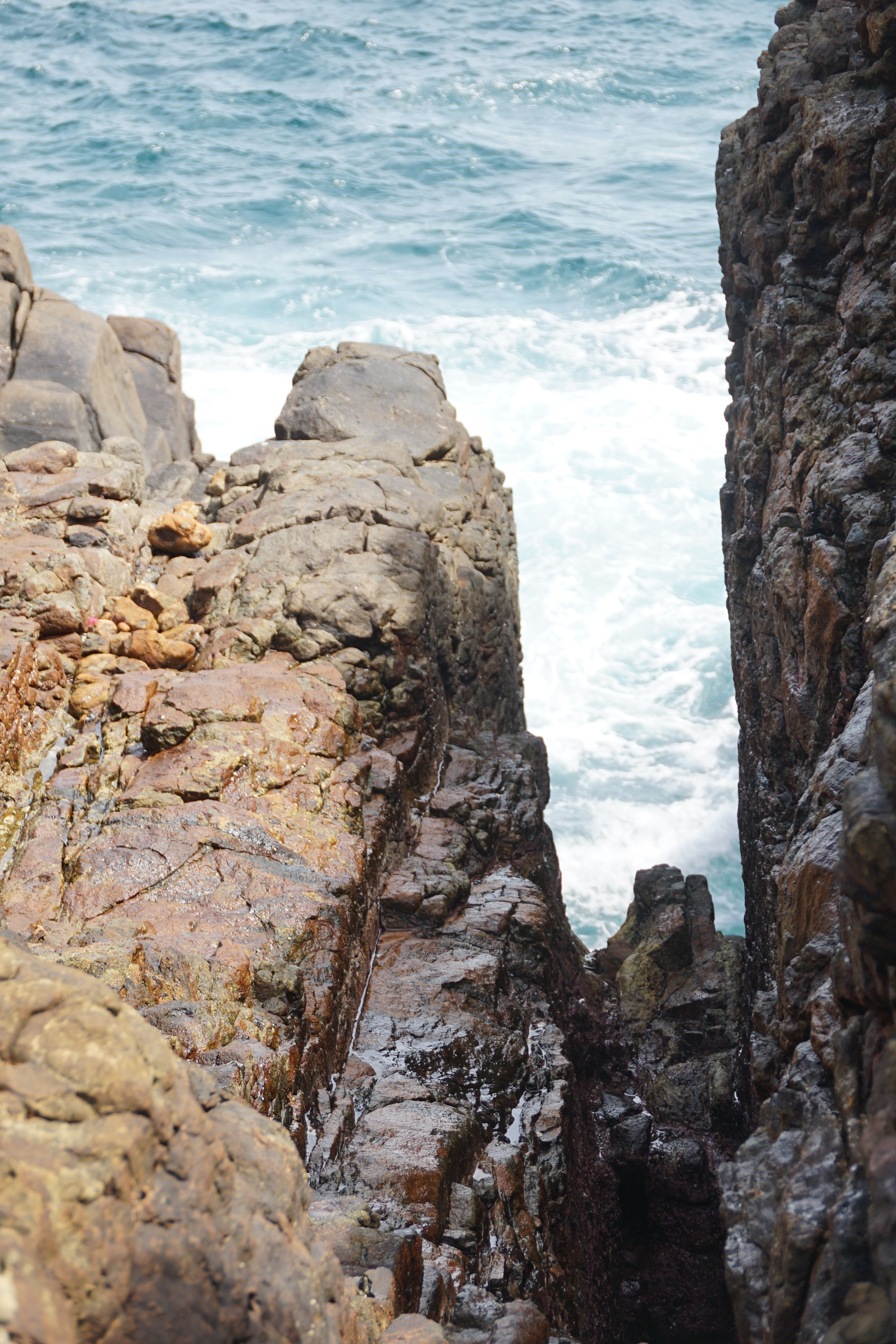
Hummanaya blowhole

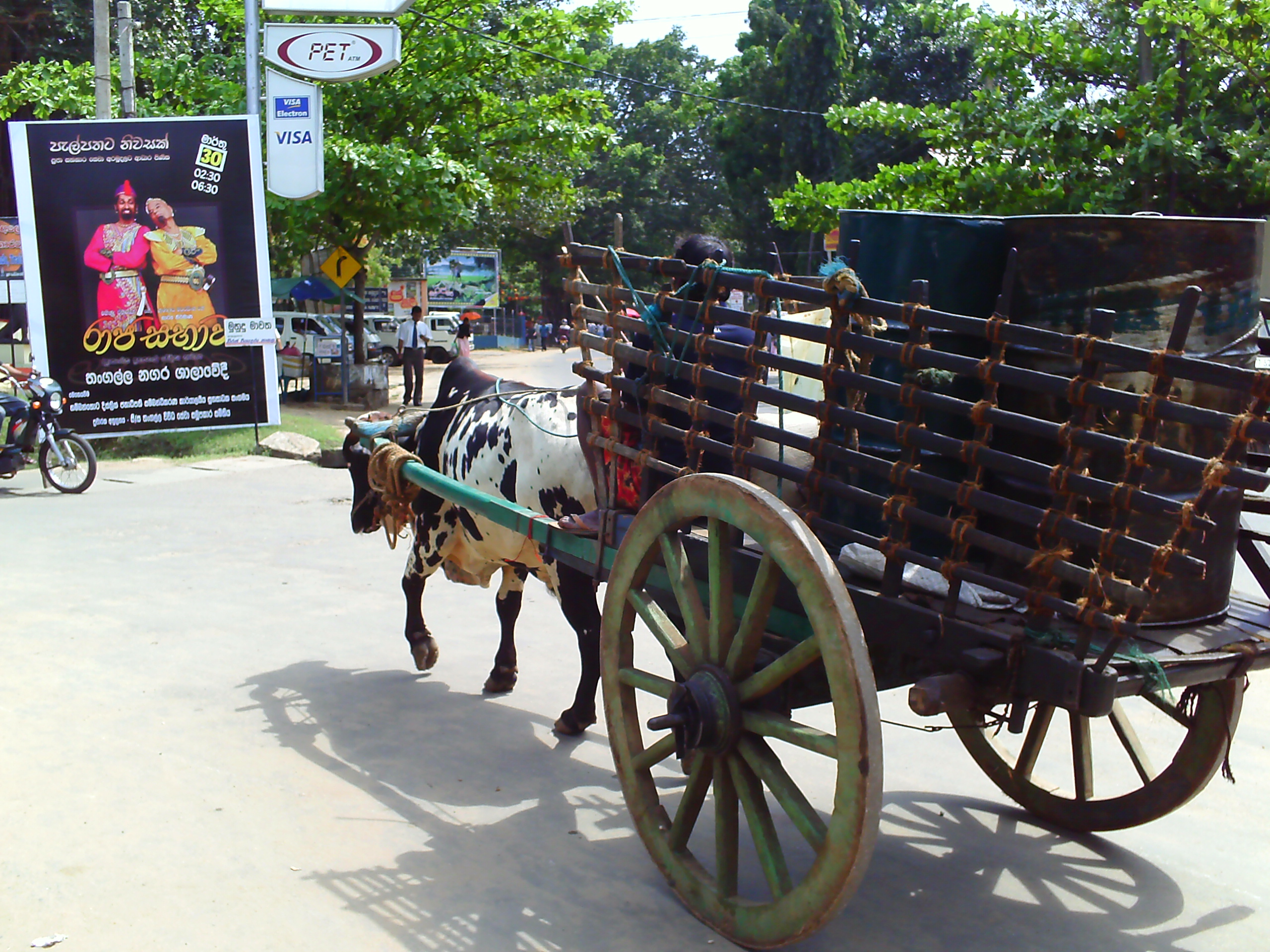
Bullock cart at Tangalle

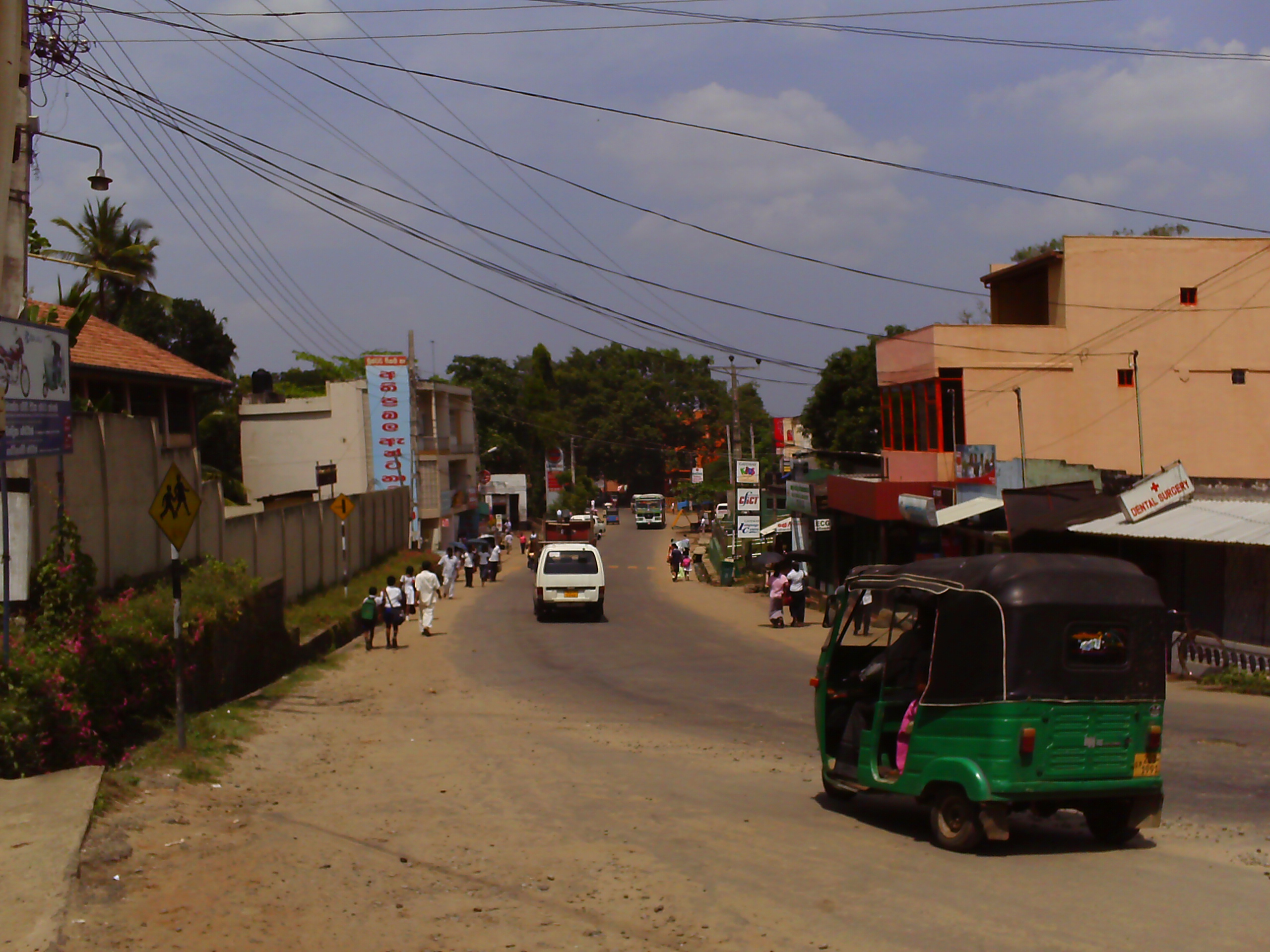
View of the Tangalle main road

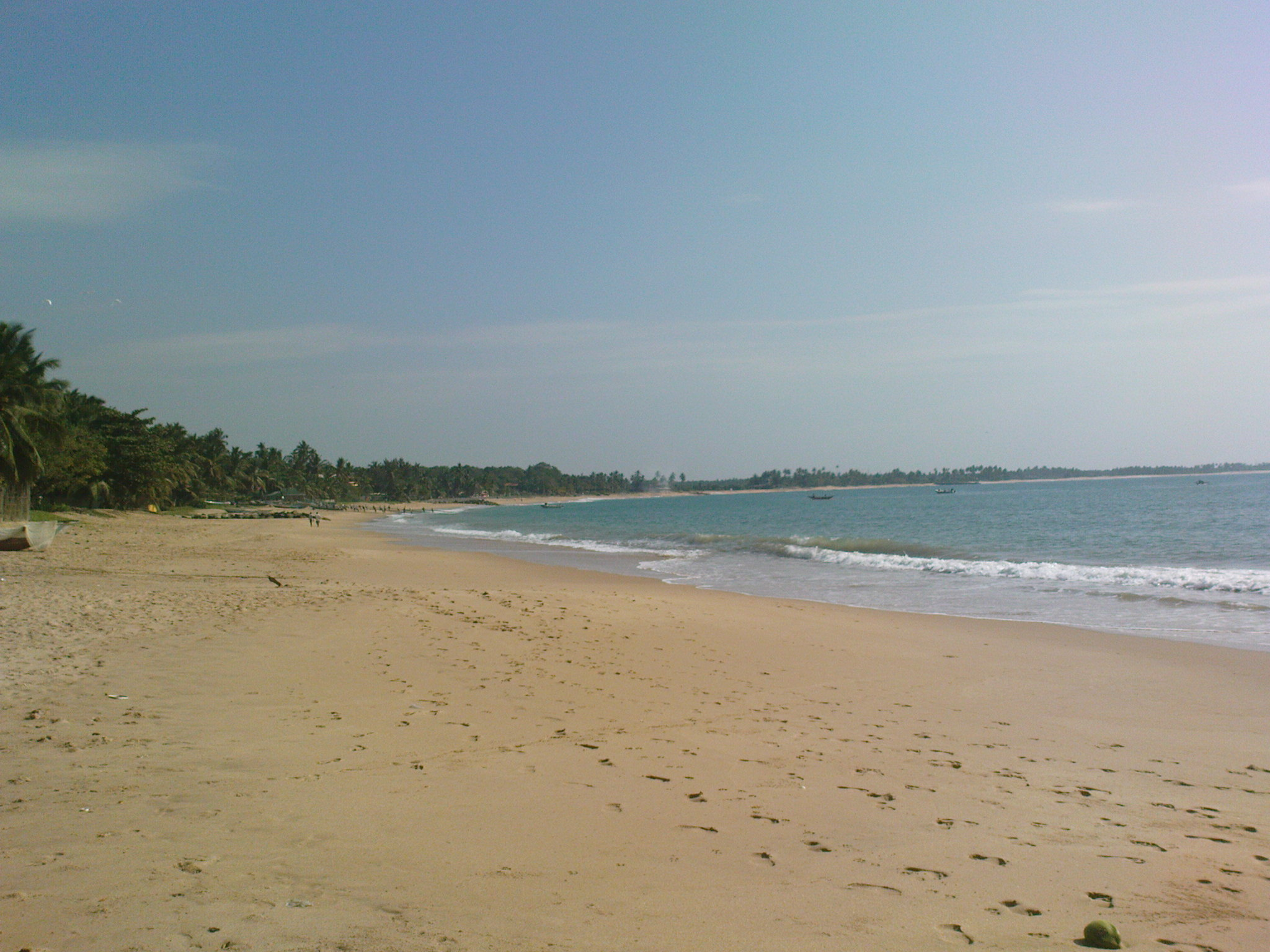
The beach at Tangalle

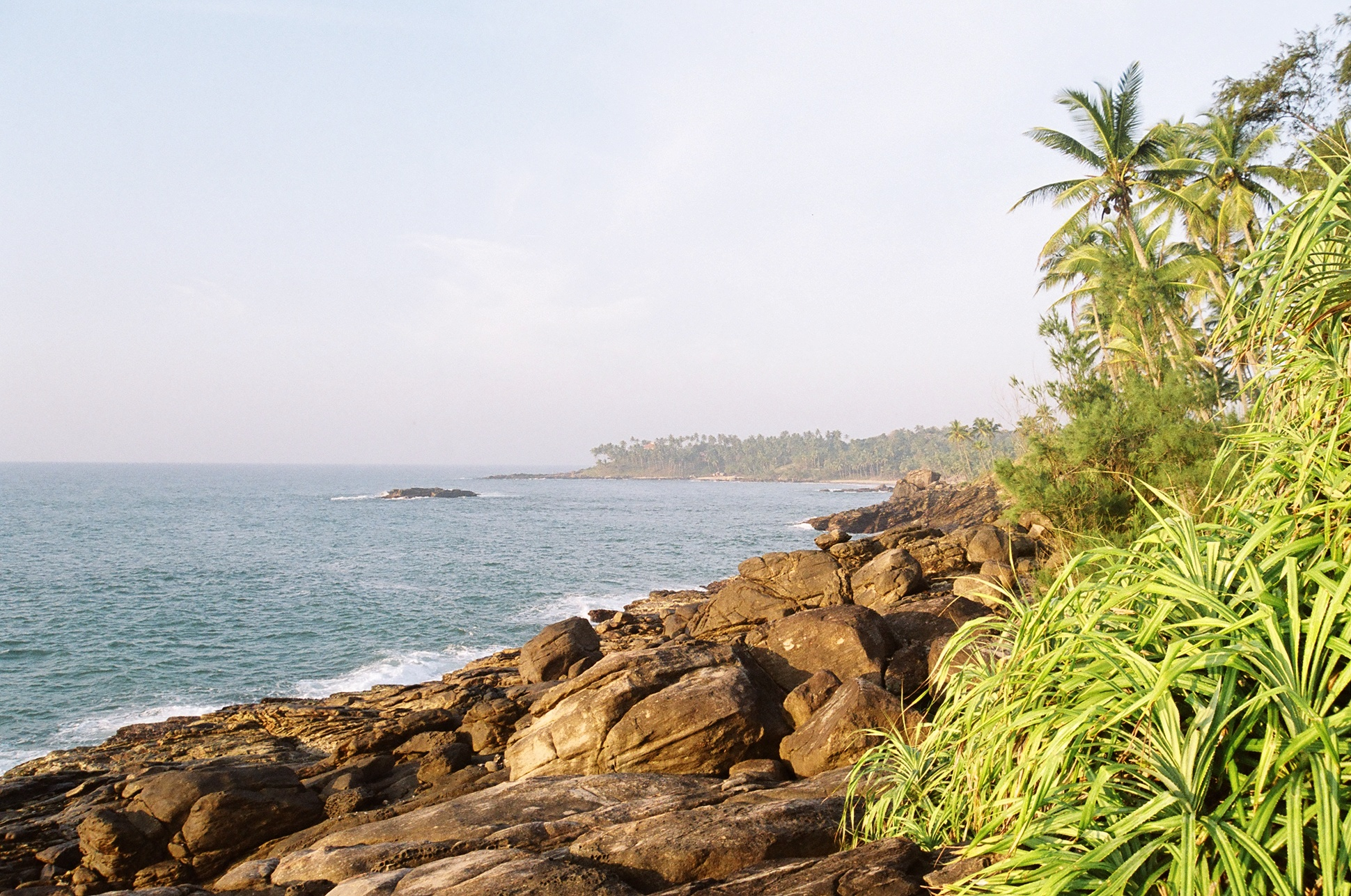
Tangalle coastline

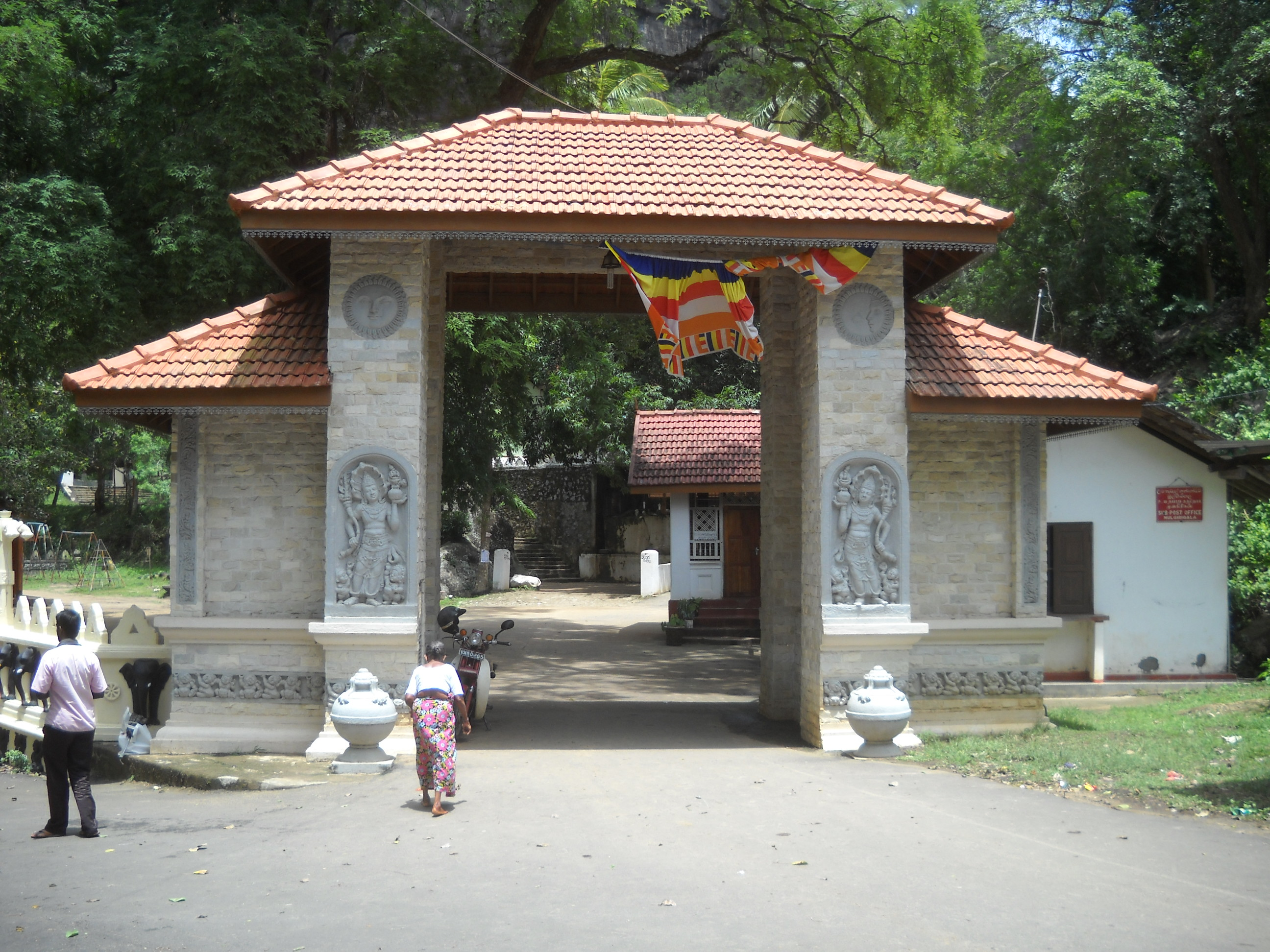
Mulkirigala Rock Temple

== Notable residents ==
Suwanda Hennedige Sauris Silva (5 May 1898 – October 1982), dancer (principal dancer of his father's dance troupe, performed the first public low country dance for the visiting Queen Elizabeth), poet, educationalist, social-worker, journalist. He was the pioneer in committing to writing the oral tradition of the healing ceremony of Tovil. Locally a road, Sauris Silva Mawata, has been named after him.

Mahinda Rajapaksa

Sri Lankan politician who served as the sixth President of Sri Lanka from 19 November 2005 to 9 January 2015. A lawyer by profession, Rajapaksa was first elected to the Parliament of Sri Lanka in 1970, and he served as prime minister from 6 April 2004 until his victory in the 2005 presidential election . He was sworn in for his first six-year term as president on 19 November 2005. He was re-elected for a second term on 27 January 2010.
