= Shelton Jayasinghe =

Sri Lankan politician

Donald Shelton Jayasinghe (1922 - 1978) was a Sri Lankan politician. He served as the Minister of Posts and Telecommunications (1977-1978) and Member of Parliament from the Wattala.

Jayasinghe was elected from the Wattala electorate from the United National Party to the House of Representatives in the 1960 March general elections, retained his seat in the 1960 July general elections and the 1965 general elections. He was appointed Parliamentary Secretary to the Minister of Industries and Fisheries in 1965. In the 1970 general elections he was defeated, but was elected in the 1977 general elections and was appointed Minister of Posts and Telecommunications, serving until his death in 1978.
