= Second Dissanayake cabinet =

Government of Sri Lanka since November 2024

Second Anura Kumara Dissanayake cabinet
- Cabinet of Sri Lanka

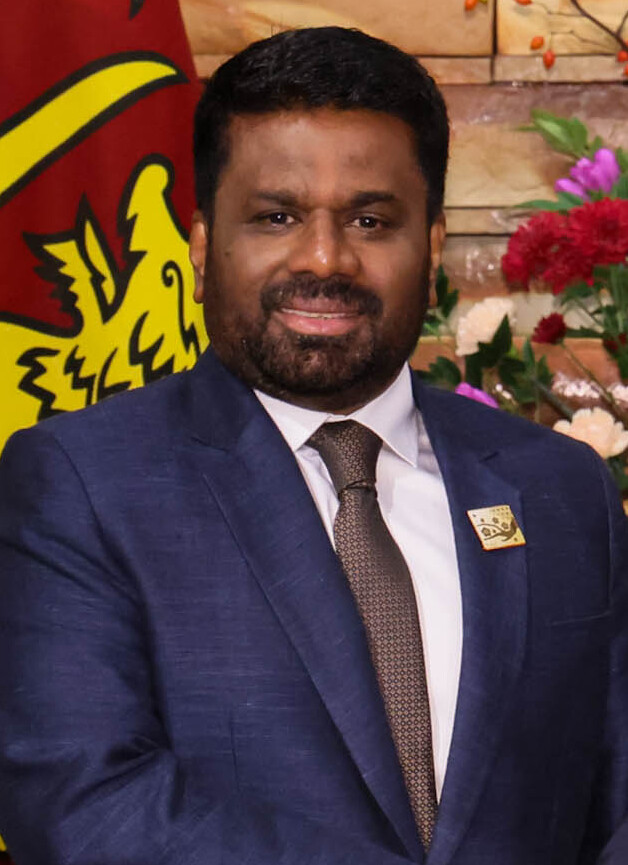
- Date formed: 18 November 2024

People and organisations
- Head of state: Anura Kumara Dissanayake
- Head of government: Anura Kumara Dissanayake
- Deputy head of government: Harini Amarasuriya
- Total no. of members: 23
- Member parties: National People's Power
- Status in legislature: Supermajority government
- Opposition party: Samagi Jana Balawegaya
- Opposition leader: Sajith Premadasa

History
- Election: 2024
- Legislature term: 17th
- Predecessor: Dissanayake I

The second Dissanayake cabinet is the current central government of Sri Lanka led by President Anura Kumara Dissanayake. It was formed on 18 November 2024 after the parliamentary election.

== Cabinet members ==
Articles 42 to 47 of the Constitution govern the appointment of cabinet ministers, non-cabinet ministers and deputy ministers. These articles also outline the assignment of subjects, functions, departments, statutory institutions and public corporations to the ministries. The members of the Cabinet are as follows:

No.	Name	Portrait	Party	Office	Electoral District	Took office	Left office	Ref.
1	Anura Kumara Dissanayake		National People's Power	President	Sri Lanka	23 September 2024 (Note: Continuation of same office held in previous cabinet.)		
1	Anura Kumara Dissanayake		National People's Power	Minister of Defence	Sri Lanka	24 September 2024		
1	Anura Kumara Dissanayake		National People's Power	Minister of Finance, Planning and Economic Development	Sri Lanka	24 September 2024		
1	Anura Kumara Dissanayake		National People's Power	Minister of Digital Economy	Sri Lanka	18 November 2024		
2	Harini Amarasuriya		National People's Power	Prime Minister	Colombo	24 September 2024		
2	Harini Amarasuriya		National People's Power	Minister of Education, Higher Education and Vocational Education	Colombo	24 September 2024		
3	Vijitha Herath		National People's Power	Minister of Foreign Affairs, Foreign Employment and Tourism	Gampaha	24 September 2024		
4	Chandana Abayarathna		National People's Power	Minister of Public Administration, Provincial Councils and Local Government	Puttalam	18 November 2024		
5	Harshana Nanayakkara		National People's Power	Minister of Justice and National Integration	Colombo	18 November 2024		
6	Saroja Savithri Paulraj		National People's Power	Minister of Women and Child Affairs	Matara	18 November 2024		
7	K. D. Lalkantha		National People's Power	Minister of Agriculture, Livestock, Land and Irrigation	Kandy	18 November 2024		
8	Anura Karunathilake		National People's Power	Minister of Urban Development, Construction and Housing	National list	18 November 2024	10 October 2025	
8	Anura Karunathilake		National People's Power	Minister of Ports and Civil Aviation	National list	10 October 2025		
8	Anura Karunathilake		National People's Power	Minister of Energy	National list	20 April 2026		
9	Ramalingam Chandrasekar		National People's Power	Minister of Fisheries, Aquatic and Ocean Resources	National list	18 November 2024		
10	Upali Pannilage		National People's Power	Minister of Rural Development, Social Security and Community Empowerment	National list	18 November 2024		
11	Sunil Handunnetti		National People's Power	Minister of Industries and Entrepreneurship Development	Matara	18 November 2024		
12	Ananda Wijepala		National People's Power	Minister of Public Security and Parliamentary Affairs	Kurunegala	18 November 2024		
13	Bimal Rathnayake		National People's Power	Minister of Transport, Highways, Ports and Civil Aviation	National list	18 November 2024	10 October 2025	
13	Bimal Rathnayake		National People's Power	Minister of Transport, Highways and Urban Development	National list	10 October 2025		
14	Hiniduma Sunil Senevi		National People's Power	Minister of Buddha Sasana, Religious and Cultural Affairs	Ratnapura	18 November 2024		
15	Nalinda Jayatissa		National People's Power	Minister of Health and Mass Media	Kalutara	18 November 2024		
15	Nalinda Jayatissa		National People's Power	Cabinet Spokesperson	Kalutara	19 November 2024		
16	Samantha Vidyaratna		National People's Power	Minister of Plantation and Community Infrastructure	Badulla	18 November 2024		
17	Sunil Kumara Gamage		National People's Power	Minister of Youth Affairs and Sports	National list	18 November 2024		
18	Wasantha Samarasinghe		National People's Power	Minister of Trade, Commerce, Food Security and Cooperative Development	Anuradhapura	18 November 2024		
19	Chrishantha Abeysena		National People's Power	Minister of Science and Technology	Gampaha	18 November 2024		
20	Anil Jayantha		National People's Power	Minister of Labour	Gampaha	18 November 2024		
21	Kumara Jayakody		National People's Power	Minister of Energy	National list	18 November 2024	17 April 2026	
22	Dammika Patabendi		National People's Power	Minister of Environment	Kegalle	18 November 2024		
23	Susil Ranasinghe		National People's Power	Minister of Housing, Construction and Water Supply	Anuradhapura	10 October 2025		

=== Formation of government ===
The National People's Power (NPP), having secured a supermajority with 159 seats, formed the next government of Sri Lanka. The new cabinet of ministers, sworn in on 18 November 2024, comprised 21 members elected in the recent parliamentary election, along with the president, who retained the portfolios of Defence, Finance and Digital Economy. This was carried out in accordance with Articles 42 to 47 of the Constitution. Harini Amarasuriya continued as prime minister, in addition to holding the ministerial portfolio of Education, Higher Education and Vocational Education.

Bimal Rathnayake and Nalinda Jayatissa of the NPP were appointed as Leader of the House and Chief Government Whip, respectively, on 19 November 2024 by the President.

=== Changes ===
- On 10 October 2025, a cabinet reshuffle was carried out that included new appointments and changes affecting three cabinet ministers and ten deputy ministers. The number of cabinet members, including the president, increased from 22 to 23.
- Kumara Jayakody resigned from his post as the minister of energy on 17 April 2026 in order to facilitate an impartial and independent inquiry into controversial coal imports.
- Anura Karunathilake was appointed the minister of energy on 20 April 2026 in addition to his current ministerial responsibilities.

== Deputy ministers ==
Ministers, who assist the cabinet, appointed under article 46(1) of the Constitution.

No.	Name	Portrait	Party	Office	Took office	Left office	Ref.
1	Anil Jayantha		National People's Power	Deputy Minister of Economic Development	21 November 2024	10 October 2025	
1	Anil Jayantha		National People's Power	Deputy Minister of Finance and Planning	10 October 2025		
2	M. D. Namal Karunaratne		National People's Power	Deputy Minister of Agriculture and Livestock	21 November 2024		
3	Wasantha Piyathissa		National People's Power	Deputy Minister of Rural Development, Social Security and Community Empowerment	21 November 2024		
4	Nalin Hewage		National People's Power	Deputy Minister of Vocational Education	21 November 2024		
5	R. M. Jayawardena		National People's Power	Deputy Minister of Trade, Commerce, Food Security and Co-operative Development	21 November 2024		
6	Gamagedara Dissanayake		National People's Power	Deputy Minister of Buddha Sasana, Religious and Cultural Affairs	21 November 2024		
7	T. B. Sarath		National People's Power	Deputy Minister of Housing	21 November 2024	10 October 2025	
7	T. B. Sarath		National People's Power	Deputy Minister of Housing, Construction and Water Supply	10 October 2025		
8	Rathna Gamage		National People's Power	Deputy Minister of Fisheries, Aquatic and Ocean Resources	21 November 2024		
9	Mahinda Jayasinghe		National People's Power	Deputy Minister of Labour	21 November 2024		
10	Aruna Jayasekara		National People's Power	Deputy Minister of Defence	21 November 2024		
11	Arun Hemachandra		National People's Power	Deputy Minister of Foreign Affairs and Foreign Employment	21 November 2024		
12	Anton Jayakody		National People's Power	Deputy Minister of Environment	21 November 2024		
13	Muneer Mulaffer		National People's Power	Deputy Minister of National Integrity	21 November 2024	10 October 2025	
13	Muneer Mulaffer		National People's Power	Deputy Minister of Religious and Cultural Affairs	10 October 2025		
14	Eranga Weeraratne		National People's Power	Deputy Minister of Digital Economy	21 November 2024		
15	Eranga Gunasekara		National People's Power	Deputy Minister of Youth Affairs	21 November 2024	10 October 2025	
15	Eranga Gunasekara		National People's Power	Deputy Minister of Urban Development	10 October 2025		
16	Chathuranga Abeysinghe		National People's Power	Deputy Minister of Industries and Entrepreneurship Development	21 November 2024		
17	Janitha Kodithuwakku		National People's Power	Deputy Minister of Ports and Civil Aviation	21 November 2024		
18	Namal Sudarshana		National People's Power	Deputy Minister of Women and Child Affairs	21 November 2024		
19	Prabha Senarath		National People's Power	Deputy Minister of Provincial Councils and Local Government	21 November 2024		
20	Prasanna Gunasena		National People's Power	Deputy Minister of Transport and Highways	21 November 2024		
21	Hansaka Wijemuni		National People's Power	Deputy Minister of Health and Mass Media	21 November 2024	10 October 2025	
21	Hansaka Wijemuni		National People's Power	Deputy Minister of Health	10 October 2025		
22	Upali Samarasinghe		National People's Power	Deputy Minister of Co-operative Development	21 November 2024		
23	Ruwan Ranasinghe		National People's Power	Deputy Minister of Tourism	21 November 2024		
24	Sugath Thilakaratne		National People's Power	Deputy Minister of Sports	21 November 2024		
25	S. Pradeep		National People's Power	Deputy Minister of Plantation and Community Infrastructure	21 November 2024		
26	Sunil Watagala		National People's Power	Deputy Minister of Public Security and Parliamentary Affairs	21 November 2024		
27	Madhura Senevirathna		National People's Power	Deputy Minister of Education and Higher Education	21 November 2024		
—N/a	Harshana Sooriyapperuma		National People's Power	Deputy Minister of Finance and Planning	21 November 2024	20 June 2025	
—N/a	Susil Ranasinghe		National People's Power	Deputy Minister of Land and Irrigation	21 November 2024	10 October 2025	(Note: Appointed as the Minister of Housing, Construction and Water Supply on 10 October 2025)
28	Aravinda Vitharana		National People's Power	Deputy Minister of Land and Irrigation	10 October 2025		
29	Dinindu Hennayake		National People's Power	Deputy Minister of Youth Affairs	10 October 2025		
30	Nishantha Jayaweera		National People's Power	Deputy Minister of Economic Development	10 October 2025		
31	Kaushalya Ariyarathne		National People's Power	Deputy Minister of Mass Media	10 October 2025		
32	Akram Ilyas		National People's Power	Deputy Minister of Energy	10 October 2025		

=== Appointment of deputy ministers ===
On 21 November 2024, 29 MPs were sworn in as deputy ministers. Anil Jayantha Fernando, the Cabinet Minister for Labour, was assigned the additional role of Deputy Minister for Economic Development alongside his existing responsibilities.

=== Changes ===
- Harshana Sooriyapperuma resigned from both his parliamentary seat and his position as Deputy Minister of Finance and Planning on 20 June 2025, to assume duties as Secretary to the Ministry of Finance.
- On 10 October 2025, a ministerial reshuffle was carried out that included new appointments and changes affecting three cabinet ministers and ten deputy ministers. The number of deputy ministers, increased from 29 to 32.
