= First Dissanayake cabinet =

Government of Sri Lanka from September to November 2024

First Anura Kumara Dissanayake cabinet
- Cabinet of Sri Lanka

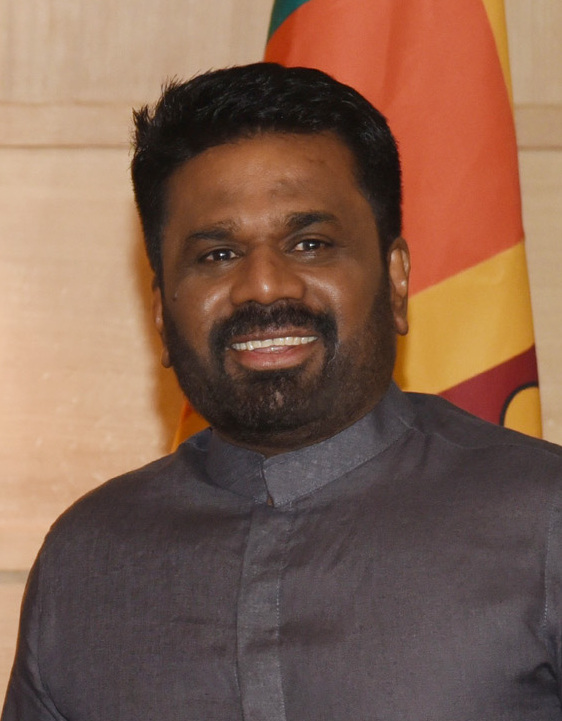
- Date formed: 24 September 2024
- Date dissolved: 18 November 2024

People and organisations
- Head of state: Anura Kumara Dissanayake
- Head of government: Anura Kumara Dissanayake
- Deputy head of government: Harini Amarasuriya
- Total no. of members: 3
- Member parties: National People's Power
- Status in legislature: Interim government
- Opposition party: Samagi Jana Balawegaya
- Opposition leader: Sajith Premadasa

History
- Election: 2024 presidential
- Outgoing election: 2024 parliamentary
- Legislature term: 16th
- Predecessor: Wickremesinghe
- Successor: Dissanayake II

The first Dissanayake cabinet was a central government of Sri Lanka led by President Anura Kumara Dissanayake. It was a 3-member interim cabinet formed in September 2024 after the presidential election. The cabinet ended in November 2024, following the parliamentary election.

== Cabinet members ==
Ministers appointed under article 43(1) of the constitution. The members of the cabinet is as follows:

Name	Portrait	Party	Office	Took office	Left office	^{Refs.}
Anura Kumara Dissanayake		National People's Power	President	23 September 2024		
Anura Kumara Dissanayake		National People's Power	Minister of Agriculture, Land, Livestock, Irrigation, Fisheries and Aquatic Resources	24 September 2024		
Anura Kumara Dissanayake		National People's Power	Minister of Defence	24 September 2024		
Anura Kumara Dissanayake		National People's Power	Minister of Energy	24 September 2024		
Anura Kumara Dissanayake		National People's Power	Minister of Finance, Economic Development, Policy Formulation, Planning and Tourism	24 September 2024		
Harini Amarasuriya		National People's Power	Prime Minister	24 September 2024		
Harini Amarasuriya		National People's Power	Minister of Education, Science and Technology	24 September 2024		
Harini Amarasuriya		National People's Power	Minister of Health	24 September 2024		
Harini Amarasuriya		National People's Power	Minister of Justice, Public Administration, Provincial Councils, Local Government and Labour	24 September 2024		
Harini Amarasuriya		National People's Power	Minister of Trade, Commercial, Food Security, Co-operative Development, Industries and Entrepreneur Development	24 September 2024		
Harini Amarasuriya		National People's Power	Minister of Women, Child and Youth Affairs and Sports	24 September 2024		
Vijitha Herath		National People's Power	Minister of Buddha Sasana, Religious and Cultural Affairs, National Integration, Social Security and Mass Media	24 September 2024		
Vijitha Herath		National People's Power	Minister of Environment, Wildlife, Forest Resources, Water Supply, Plantation and Community, and Infrastructure	24 September 2024		
Vijitha Herath		National People's Power	Minister of Foreign Affairs	24 September 2024		
Vijitha Herath		National People's Power	Minister of Public Security	24 September 2024		
Vijitha Herath		National People's Power	Minister of Rural and Urban Development, and Housing and Construction	24 September 2024		
Vijitha Herath		National People's Power	Minister of Transport, Highways, Ports and Civil Aviation	24 September 2024		
