= Anura Karunathilake =

Sri Lankan politician (born 1967)

Hon. Anura Karunathilake MP
- අනුර කරුණාතිලක அனுரா கருணாதிலேக்

Minister of Energy
- Incumbent
- Assumed office 20 April 2026
- President: Anura Kumara Dissanayake
- Prime Minister: Harini Amarasuriya
- Preceded by: Kumara Jayakody

Minister of Ports and Civil Aviation
- Incumbent
- Assumed office 10 October 2025
- President: Anura Kumara Dissanayake
- Prime Minister: Harini Amarasuriya
- Preceded by: Vijitha Herath
- Succeeded by
Cabinet positions
Minister of Urban Development, Construction and Housing
In office 18 November 2024 – 10 October 2025
President	Anura Kumara Dissanayake
Prime Minister	Harini Amarasuriya
Preceded by	Vijitha Herath
Succeeded by	Bimal Rathnayake; Susil Ranasinghe

Member of Parliament for National List
- Incumbent
- Assumed office 21 November 2024

Personal details
- Born: Anura Karunathilake; 31 December 1967 (age 58)
- Party: National People's Power
- Profession: Academic

Anura Karunathilake (born 31 December 1967) is a Sri Lankan politician and a Member of Parliament from the National list since 21 November 2024 as a member of the National People's Power.

He was appointed Minister of Ports and Civil Aviation on 10 October 2025 and Minister of Energy on 20 April 2026, in addition to his existing portfolio. Karunathilake previously served as Minister of Urban Development, Construction and Housing from 18 November 2024 to 10 October 2025.
