= Dissanayake cabinet =

Dissanayake cabinet may refer to:

- First Dissanayake cabinet
- Second Dissanayake cabinet
