= Susil Ranasinghe =

Sri Lankan politician

Hon. Susil Ranasinghe MP
- සුසිල් රණසිංහ சுசில் ரணசிங்க

Minister of Housing, Construction and Water Supply
- Incumbent
- Assumed office 10 October 2025
- President: Anura Kumara Dissanayake
- Prime Minister: Harini Amarasuriya
- Deputy: T. B. Sarath
- Preceded by: Anura Karunathilake

Member of Parliament for Anuradhapura District
- Incumbent
- Assumed office 21 November 2024
- Majority: 72,508 Preferential votes

Personal details
- Born: 10 April 1978 (age 48)
- Party: National People's Power
- Other political affiliations: Janatha Vimukthi Peramuna
- Education: University of Sri Jayewardenepura
- Occupation: Medical doctor

Susil Ranasinghe (born 10 April 1978) is a Sri Lankan politician and medical doctor currently serving as the Minister of Housing, Construction and Water Supply. He is a Member of Parliament for the Anuradhapura Electoral District as a member of the National People's Power. He was elected in the 2024 Sri Lankan parliamentary election, receiving 72,508 preferential votes.

== Education ==
Ranasinghe completed his secondary education at Galenbindunuwewa Central College. He later pursued higher studies at the University of Sri Jayewardenepura, where he graduated with a medical degree in 2004.

== Medical career ==
Ranasinghe has been practicing medicine in Teaching Hospital Anuradhapura, DBH Dambulla, and Prison Hospital Anuradhapura.

== Political career ==
Ranasinghe entered politics in 2024 when he successfully ran for a seat in the Parliament of Sri Lanka as a candidate of the National People's Power. His campaign was centered around health policy reform, public health advocacy, and community development within the Anuradhapura District.

Shortly after the new parliament was sworn in, Ranasinghe was sworn in as the Deputy Minister of Land and Irrigation on 21 November 2024. Following a cabinet reshuffle, Ranasinghe was sworn in as the Minister of Housing, Construction and Water Supply on 10 October 2025, thus making him the newest minister in the current cabinet.
