= Harshana Suriyapperuma =

Sri Lankan politician (born 1973)

Hon. Harshana Suriyapperuma
- හර්ෂණ සූරියප්පෙරුම ஹர்சன சூரியப்பெரும
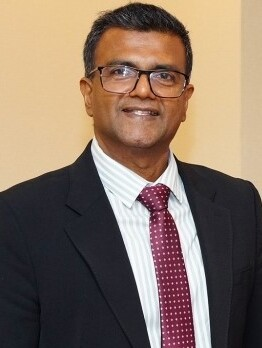
- Harshana Suriyapperuma in 2025

Secretary to the Ministry of Finance
- Incumbent
- Assumed office 23 June 2025
- President: Anura Kumara Dissanayake
- Minister: Anura Kumara Dissanayake
- Preceded by: Mahinda Siriwardana

Deputy Minister of Finance and Planning
- In office 21 November 2024 – 20 June 2025
- President: Anura Kumara Dissanayake
- Prime Minister: Harini Amarasuriya
- Minister: Anura Kumara Dissanayake
- Preceded by: Ajith Nivard Cabraal

Member of Parliament for National List
- In office 21 November 2024 – 20 June 2025
- Succeeded by: Nishantha Jayaweera

Personal details
- Born: 15 February 1973 (age 53)
- Party: National People's Power
- Other political affiliations: Janatha Vimukthi Peramuna
- Relations: Yasantha Suriyapperuma

Harshana Peiris Suriyapperuma (born 15 February 1973) is a Sri Lankan politician who is currently serving as the Secretary to the Ministry of Finance. He previously served as the deputy minister of finance and planning.

He was appointed as a Member of Parliament from the National List following the 2024 Sri Lankan parliamentary election, representing the National People's Power.

Suriyapperuma resigned from both his parliamentary seat and deputy ministerial post on 20 June 2025. On 23 June, he was appointed as the secretary to the Ministry of Finance.

== Career ==
Sooriyapperuma qualified as a Fellow of CIMA UK, gained an MBA from the Postgraduate Institute of Management and PhD in business networking and performance from the Management & Science University. Having worked in several roles related to finance and administration in the private sector, he served as the Director Corporate Affairs of the Securities and Exchange Commission of Sri Lanka from 2013 to 2021, before moving back to the private sector until 2023. He was member of the NPP economic council from 2022.

== Controversy ==
On 22 April 2026, Maithri Gunaratne, a former Governor of Central Province, claimed that the Finance, Planning and Economic Development Ministry, under President Anura Kumara Dissanayake and Suriyapperuma as the secretary to the ministry, had made a wrongful payment of US$2.5 million to a third party instead of settling part of a US$22.9 million debt repayment to Australia. He also requested the Parliament of Sri Lanka investigate the matter through a letter addressed to the Speaker. Nalinda Jayatissa, the Cabinet spokesperson, stated that a clarification would be issued by the ministry in due course.

The ministry subsequently claimed that the funds had been diverted by a hacker following a breach of its systems and that the cyberattack and the resulting fraud were first identified in January 2026. Complaints were lodged with the Criminal Investigation Department (CID) and the Financial Intelligence Unit (FIU) of the Central Bank of Sri Lanka. The ministry also stated that five officials have been interdicted following an internal investigation and it would seek assistance from foreign partners to trace the funds and pursue further legal action.
