= Ministry of Public Administration, Home Affairs, Provincial Councils and Local Government =

Government ministry of Sri Lanka

- රාජ්‍ය පරිපාලන, ස්වදේශ කටයුතු, පළාත් සභා හා පළාත් පාලන අමාත්‍යාංශය பொதுநிருவாக, உள்நாட்டலுவல்கள், மாகாண சபைகள் மற்றும் உள்ளூராட்சி அமைச்சு

Ministry overview
- Formed: 1931; 95 years ago
- Jurisdiction: Government of Sri Lanka
- Headquarters: 330 Union Place, Colombo 2; 6°55′09.00″N 79°51′35.40″E
- Annual budget: ▼LKR 81.24 billion (2025)
- Minister responsible: Chandana Abayarathna, Minister of Public Administration, Home Affairs, Provincial Councils and Local Government
- Ministry executive: S. Alokabandara, Ministry Secretary
- Child agencies: Local Loans and Development Fund; Sri Lanka Institute of Local Governance
- Website: pubad.gov.lk

The Ministry of Public Administration, Home Affairs, Provincial Councils and Local Government (Sinhala: රාජ්‍ය පරිපාලන, ස්වදේශ කටයුතු, පළාත් සභා හා පළාත් පාලන අමාත්‍යාංශය; Tamil: பொதுநிருவாக, உள்நாட்டலுவல்கள், மாகாண சபைகள் மற்றும் உள்ளூராட்சி அமைச்சு) is a cabinet ministry of the Government of Sri Lanka responsible for provincial councils and local government. The ministry is responsible for formulating and implementing national policy on provincial councils and Local Government and other subjects which come under its purview. The current Minister of Provincial Councils and Local Government is Dinesh Gunawardena. The ministry's secretary is H. T. Kamal Pathmasiri. The ministry has had oversight of drafting the 20th Amendment to the Sri Lankan Constitution.

== Ministers ==
Parties

Ceylon National Congress United National Party Sri Lanka Freedom Party Ilankai Tamil Arasu Kachchi Sri Lanka Podujana Peramuna National People's Power

Ministers of Public Administration, Home Affairs, Provincial Councils and Local Government
Name	Portrait	Party	Took office	Left office	Head of government	Ministerial title	Refs
Charles Batuwantudawe			1931	1935		Minister of Local Administration	
S. W. R. D. Bandaranaike			1936	1944		Minister of Local Administration	
S. W. R. D. Bandaranaike		United National Party	26 September 1947	12 July 1951	D. S. Senanayake	Minister of Health and Local Government	
Dudley Senanayake		United National Party	26 March 1952	1952	Dudley Senanayake	Minister of Health and Local Government	
C. W. W. Kannangara			19 June 1952		Dudley Senanayake	Minister of Local Government	
C. W. W. Kannangara					John Kotelawala	Minister of Local Government	
Jayaweera Kuruppu		Sri Lanka Freedom Party			S. W. R. D. Bandaranaike	Minister of Local Government and Cultural Affairs	
Vimala Wijewardene		Sri Lanka Freedom Party	9 June 1959		S. W. R. D. Bandaranaike	Minister of Local Government and Housing	
Vimala Wijewardene		Sri Lanka Freedom Party		21 November 1959	W. Dahanayake	Minister of Local Government and Housing	
M. B. W. Mediwake		Sri Lanka Freedom Party			W. Dahanayake	Minister of Local Government and Housing	
J. R. Jayewardene		United National Party	23 March 1960	1960	Dudley Senanayake	Minister of Local Government and Housing	
Mahanama Samaraweera		Sri Lanka Freedom Party	23 July 1960		Sirimavo Bandaranaike	Minister of Local Government and Housing	
M. Tiruchelvam		Illankai Tamil Arasu Kachchi	March 1965	November 1968	Dudley Senanayake	Minister of Local Government	
Ranasinghe Premadasa		United National Party	1968		Dudley Senanayake	Minister of Local Government	
Felix Dias Bandaranaike	align=center	Sri Lanka Freedom Party	31 May 1970		Sirimavo Bandaranaike	Minister of Public Administration, Local Government and Home Affairs	
W. P. G. Ariyadasa					Sirimavo Bandaranaike	Minister of Local Government	
Ranasinghe Premadasa		United National Party	23 July 1977		J. R. Jayewardene	Minister of Local Government, Housing and Construction	
U. B. Wijekoon		United National Party	18 February 1989	28 March 1990	Ranasinghe Premadasa	Minister of Public Administration, Provincial Councils and Home Affairs	
Festus Perera		United National Party	30 March 1990		Ranasinghe Premadasa	Minister of Public Administration, Provincial Councils and Home Affairs	
Amarasiri Dodangoda		Sri Lanka Freedom Party	19 August 1994		D. B. Wijetunga	Minister of Home Affairs, Local Government and Co-operatives	
Nandimithra Ekanayake		Sri Lanka Freedom Party	19 October 2000		Chandrika Kumaratunga	Minister of Provincial Councils and Local Government	
Richard Pathirana		Sri Lanka Freedom Party	14 September 2001		Chandrika Kumaratunga	Minister of Public Administration, Home Affairs, Provincial Councils, Local Government and Southern Development	
Alick Aluvihare		United National Party	12 December 2001		Chandrika Kumaratunga	Minister of Home Affairs and Local Government	
Janaka Bandara Tennakoon		Sri Lanka Freedom Party	10 April 2004		Chandrika Kumaratunga	Minister of Provincial Councils and Local Government	
Janaka Bandara Tennakoon		Sri Lanka Freedom Party	23 November 2005		Mahinda Rajapaksa	Minister of Local Government and Provincial Councils	
A. L. M. Athaullah		National Congress	23 April 2010		Mahinda Rajapaksa	Minister of Local Government and Provincial Councils	
Karu Jayasuriya		United National Party	12 January 2015	22 March 2015	Maithripala Sirisena	Minister of Public Administration, Provincial Councils, Local Government and Democratic Governance	
Karu Jayasuriya		United National Party	22 March 2015	17 August 2015	Maithripala Sirisena	Minister of Public Administration, Local Government and Democratic Governance	
Faiszer Musthapha		Sri Lanka Freedom Party	9 September 2015	26 October 2018	Maithripala Sirisena	Minister of Provincial Councils and Local Government	
Vajira Abeywardena		United National Party	20 December 2018	21 November 2019	Maithripala Sirisena	State Minister of Provincial Councils and Local Government	
Janaka Bandara Tennakoon		Sri Lanka Podujana Peramuna	22 November 2019	3 April 2022	Gotabaya Rajapaksa	Minister of Public Administration, Home Affairs, Provincial Councils and Local Government	
Dinesh Gunawardena		Sri Lanka Podujana Peramuna	18 April 2022	18 April 2022	Gotabaya Rajapaksa	Minister of Public Administration, Home Affairs, Provincial Councils and Local Government	
Dinesh Gunawardena		Sri Lanka Podujana Peramuna	18 April 2022	23 September 2024	Ranil Wickremesinghe	Minister of Public Administration, Home Affairs, Provincial Councils and Local Government	
Harini Amarasuriya		National People's Power	24 September 2024	18 November 2024	Anura Kumara Dissanayake	Minister of Justice, Public Administration, Provincial Councils, Local Government and Labour	
Chandana Abayarathna		National People's Power	18 November 2024		Anura Kumara Dissanayake	Minister of State Administration, Provincial Councils and Local Government	

== Secretaries ==
Local Government Secretaries
Name	Took office	Left office	Title	Refs
Nihal Jayathilaka	25 April 2010		Local Government and Provincial Councils Secretary	
R. A. A. K. Ranawaka	12 July 2012		Local Government and Provincial Councils Secretary	
J. Dadallage	19 January 2015		Public Administration, Provincial Councils, Local Government and Democratic Governance Secretary	
H. T. Kamal Pathmasiri	11 September 2015		Provincial Councils and Local Government Secretary	
