= K. D. Lalkantha =

Agriculture Minister of Sri Lanka since 2024

Hon. K. D. Lalkantha MP
- කේ.ඩී ලාල්කාන්ත கே.டி.லால்காந்த

Minister of Agriculture, Livestock, Land and Irrigation
- Incumbent
- Assumed office 18 November 2024
- President: Anura Kumara Dissanayake
- Prime Minister: Harini Amarasuriya
- Preceded by: Anura Kumara Dissanayake

Member of Parliament for Kandy District
- Incumbent
- Assumed office 21 November 2024
- Majority: 316,951 preferential votes

Member of Parliament for Anuradhapura District
- In office 2001–2010

Minister of Primary Industries
- In office April 2004 – May 2005

Personal details
- Party: Janatha Vimukthi Peramuna
- Other political affiliations: National People's Power

Kuragamage Don Lalkantha is a Sri Lankan politician who has served as the Minister of Minister of Agriculture, Livestock, Land and Irrigation since 2024. A member of National People's Power and Janatha Vimukthi Peramuna, he was elected as a Member of Parliament for Kandy Electoral District in 2024 Sri Lankan parliamentary election. He was formerly member of the parliament for Anuradhapura District from 2001 to 2010.

== Political career ==
=== JVP Insurgency ===
Lalkantha joined the JVP, having completed its five classes orientation programme as a student, and was initially attached to the Dematagoda cell before he was transferred to his hometown in Anuradhapura. Lalkantha worked for the party at the hight of the 1987–1989 JVP insurrection until he was arrested in 1988 by the police, where tortured and detained for three months until he was produced before the Anuradhapura magistrate and sent to a detention camp at the Anuradhapura Prison under a detention order issued by the magistrate. He escaped from the detention camp during a breakout carried out by the JVP and subsequently went into hiding. He then attended a training camp and was sent to the party post at Nochchiyagama as an organizer, tasked with the disrupting the 1988 Sri Lankan presidential election. He was then posted as the party organizer for Egodapattu, building the JVP presence in the area until he was arrested and charged a second time by the Polonnaruwa police and imprisoned at the Welikada Prison.

=== Arrested for drunk driving ===
Lalkantha was arrested for driving under the influence of liquor on 1 March 2019 after his vehicle had met with an accident injuring two women in Anuradhapura.

=== Comments on human–wildlife conflict ===
On 5 December 2024, Lalkantha received backlash for comments he made in parliament regarding the human–widlife conflict in Sri Lanka. Lalkantha referred to crop-raiding experienced by local farmers, specifically by wild boar and monkey populations in the country. Calling it "animal terrorism", Lalkantha stated that "farmers must know that there are no legal restrictions preventing them from taking appropriate measures on their land to safeguard their crops from these animals. We urge them to act within their capacity to mitigate the damage caused." He further assured that the government was actively working on a comprehensive solution to the issue.

On 6 December 2024, a protest was held by animal rights activists in response to Lalkantha's comments, led by 2019 presidential candidate Ajanatha Perera. Perera stated that animals have as much a right to the land as people do, further going on to talk about human-caused habitat fragmentation due to urbanization and deforestation. She called on President Anura Kumara Dissanayake to condemn Lalkantha's "dangerous" comments, with Lalkantha being a minister in Dissanayake's cabinet.
