= Chrishantha Abeysena =

Sri Lankan politician

Hon. Prof. Chrishantha Abeysena MP

Minister of Science and Technology
- Incumbent
- Assumed office 18 November 2024
- President: Anura Kumara Dissanayake
- Prime Minister: Harini Amarasuriya
- Preceded by: Harini Amarasuriya

Member of Parliament for Gampaha District
- Incumbent
- Assumed office 21 November 2024
- Majority: 121,825 Preferential votes

Personal details
- Party: National People's Power
- Education: University of Colombo,
- Profession: Academic

Prof. Chrishantha Abeysena (Sinhala: ක්‍රිෂාන්ත අබේසේන; Tamil: கிரிஷாந்த அபேசேன) is a Sri Lankan politician who has served as the Minister of Science and Technology since November 2024. He was elected to the Parliament from Gampaha Electoral District as a member of the National People's Power in the 2024 Sri Lankan parliamentary election.

== Education ==
Abeysena undertook medical studies at the University of Colombo, where he obtained as MBBS. He then obtained an MA in Buddhist Studies from the Institute of Pali and Buddhist Studies in 1994, an MSc in Community Medicine from the Institute of Medicine in 1995, and an MA in International Relations from the University of Colombo in 1998.
