= Dammika Patabendi =

Environment Minister of Sri Lanka since 2024

Hon. Dammika Patabendi MP
- ධම්මික පටබැඳි தம்மிகா படபெந்தி

Minister of Environment
- Incumbent
- Assumed office 18 November 2024
- President: Anura Kumara Dissanayake
- Prime Minister: Harini Amarasuriya
- Preceded by: Vijitha Herath

Member of Parliament for Kegalle District
- Incumbent
- Assumed office 21 November 2024
- Majority: 186,409 Preferential votes

Personal details
- Born: 3 July 1969 (age 56)
- Party: National People's Power

Dammika Patabendi (born 3 July 1969) is a Sri Lankan politician and doctor currently serving as the Minister of Environment. He was elected to the Parliament of Sri Lanka from the Kegalle Electoral District as a member of the National People's Power.

Patabendi studied at CWW Kannangara Central, Matugama, Ananda College, Colombo and the Medical Faculty in Colombo.
