= Upali Samarasinghe =

Sri Lankan politician

Hon. Rathnayake Hettige Upali Samarasinghe MP
- රත්නායක හෙට්ටිගේ උපාලි සමරසිංහ ரத்னாயக்க ஹெட்டிகே உபாலி சமரசிங்க

National List Member of Parliament
- Incumbent
- Assumed office 21 November 2024
- President: Anura Kumara Dissanayake
- Prime Minister: Harini Amarasuriya

Member of Parliament for Vanni Electoral District

Personal details
- Party: Janatha Vimukthi Peramuna
- Other political affiliations: National People's Power

Rathnayake Hettige Upali Samarasinghe (Sinhala: රත්නායක හෙට්ටිගේ උපාලි සමරසිංහ, Tamil: ரத்னாயக்க ஹெட்டிகே உபாலி சமரசிங்க) is a Sri Lankan politician and long-time member of the Janatha Vimukthi Peramuna (JVP). He was appointed as a National List Member of Parliament in 2024 under the National People's Power (NPP) government.

== Political career ==
Samarasinghe has been associated with the JVP for many years, contributing to political and social activism. He contested the 2024 Sri Lankan parliamentary election from the Vanni District but did not secure a seat through preferential votes due to the lower percentage of Sinhala voters compared to Tamil voters in the region. Despite this, he was selected as a National List MP, emphasizing NPP's commitment to promoting regional representation and inclusion.

Samarasinghe's candidacy marks a historic milestone as he is the first Sinhalese representative from the Northern Province to be nominated from the national list and the only Sinhalese representative from the Northern Province to represent the 17th parliament.

== Background ==
In the 2013 Provincial Council Election, he served as the Authorized Agent for the JVP in the Vavuniya District.
