= Anil Jayantha Fernando =

Labour Minister of Sri Lanka since 2024

Hon. Prof. Anil Jayantha Fernando MP
- අනිල් ජයන්ත ප්‍රනාන්දු அனில் ஜெயந்த பெர்னாண்டோ

Minister of Labour
- Incumbent
- Assumed office 18 November 2024
- President: Anura Kumara Dissanayake
- Prime Minister: Harini Amarasuriya
- Preceded by: Harini Amarasuriya

Member of Parliament for Gampaha District
- Incumbent
- Assumed office 21 November 2024
- Majority: 162,433 Preferential votes

Personal details
- Party: National People's Power
- Profession: Economist, Academic

Anthonige Anil Jayantha Fernando is a Sri Lankan economist and politician. A member of the National People's Power, he was elected to the parliament in the 2024 Sri Lankan parliamentary election representing Gampaha Electoral District.
