= Hiniduma Sunil Senevi =

Minister of Buddha Sasana, Religious and Cultural Affairs of Sri Lanka since 2024

Hon. Hiniduma Sunil Senevi MP
- හිනිදුම සුනිල් සෙනෙවි ஹினிதும சுனில் செனிவி

Minister of Buddha Sasana, Religious and Cultural Affairs
- Incumbent
- Assumed office 18 November 2024
- President: Anura Kumara Dissanayake
- Prime Minister: Harini Amarasuriya
- Preceded by: Vijitha Herath

Member of Parliament for Ratnapura District
- Incumbent
- Assumed office 21 November 2024
- Majority: 76,505 Preferential votes

Personal details
- Party: National People's Power

Hiniduma Sunil Senevi is a Sri Lankan politician and who has served as the Minister of Buddha Sasana, Religious and Cultural Affairs since November 2024. He was elected to the Sri Lankan Parliament from Ratnapura Electoral District as a member of the National People's Power.
