= Dewahuwa =

Coordinates: 7°49′44″N 80°34′23″E

- Village
- Interactive map of Dewahuwa
- Country: Sri Lanka
- Province: Central Province
- District: Matale District
- Divisional Secretariat: Galewela Divisional Secretariat
- Time zone: UTC+5:30 (Sri Lanka Standard Time)

Dewahuwa is a settlement situated in the Matale District, Central Province, Sri Lanka. Dewahuwa is a colony project introduced in 1949.

== Notable people ==
- Anura Kumara Dissanayake, 10th President of Sri Lanka

== See also ==
- List of towns in Central Province, Sri Lanka
