= Rathna Gamage =

Sri Lankan politician

Rathna Gamage MP
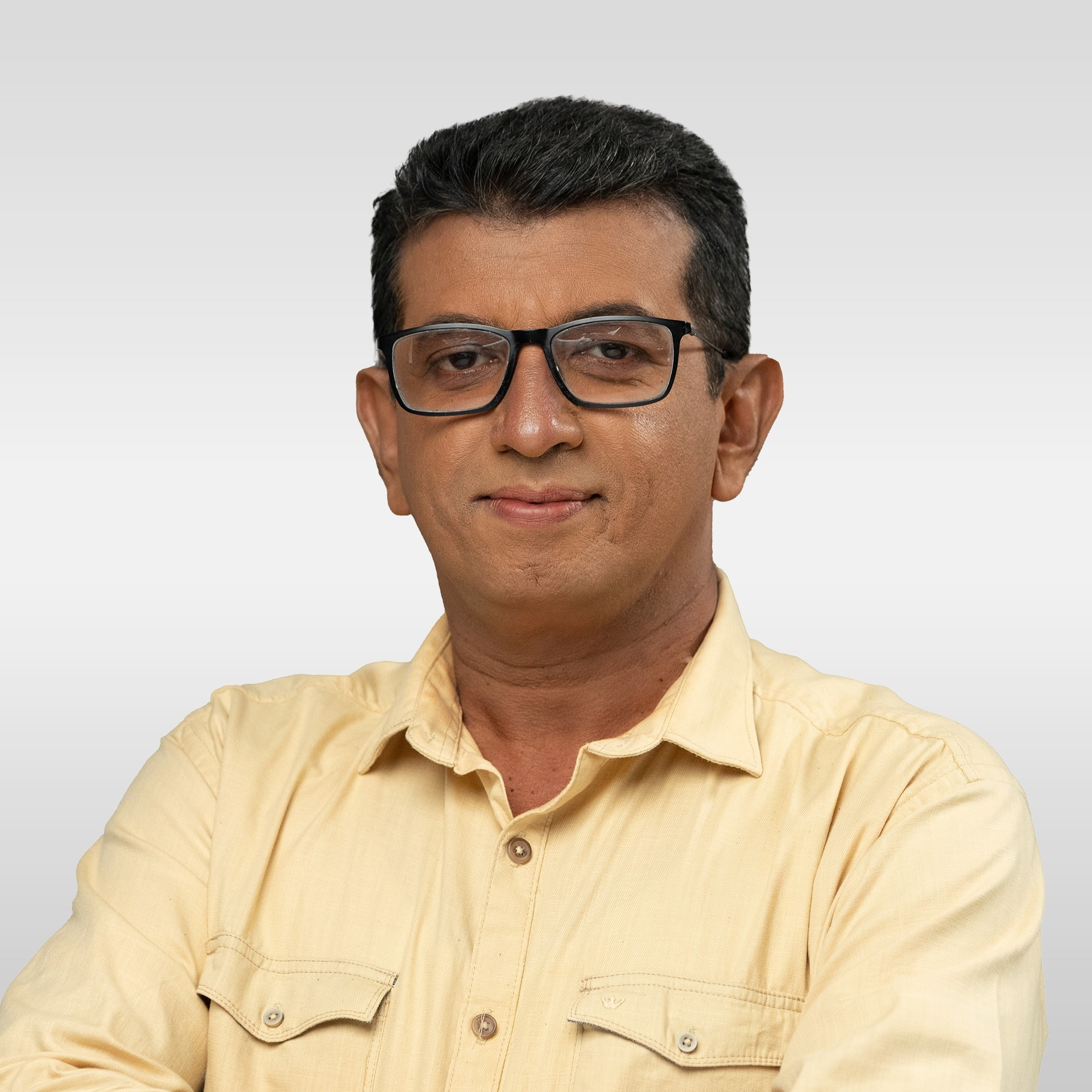

Member of Parliament for Galle District
- Incumbent
- Assumed office 21 November 2024

Deputy Minister of Fisheries, Aquatic, and Ocean Resources
- Incumbent
- Assumed office 21 November 2024

Personal details
- Born: 27 January 1972 (age 54)
- Party: Janatha Vimukthi Peramuna
- Other political affiliations: National People's Power
- Occupation: Teacher, politician

Rathna Gamage (born 27 January 1972) is a Sri Lankan teacher and politician. He was elected to the Parliament of Sri Lanka from the Galle District as a member of the National People's Power. He is a member of the Janatha Vimukthi Peramuna (JVP) and currently serves as the Deputy Minister of Fisheries, Aquatic, and Ocean Resources in president Anura Kumara Dissanayake's cabinet.

== Early life and education ==
Gamage received his primary education at Manavila Upananda National School in Galle. He then attended St. Aloysius' College, Galle, for his secondary education. He pursued higher education at the University of Ruhuna, studying physical science, but did not complete his degree.

== Professional career ==
Gamage is a government Piriven teacher, teaching 11th grade at Vidhya Pradeepa Pirivena in Manavila, Galle. He also works as a tuition class teacher, specializing in Ordinary Level (O/L) Science and Advanced Level (A/L) Physics.

== Political career ==
Gamage has been a full-time member of the JVP since 2004. His political career includes:

- Member of the Akmeemana Pradeshiya Sabhawa (Local Council) (2001–2004)
- Member of the Southern Provincial Council (2004–2009)
- Deputy Minister of Fisheries, Aquatic, and Ocean Resources (since 2024)

== Personal life ==
Rathna Gamage married in 2006.
