= Ministry of Urban Development (Sri Lanka) =

Government ministry of Sri Lanka

Agency overview
- Formed: 1978; 48 years ago
- Type: Authority
- Jurisdiction: Democratic Socialist Republic of Sri Lanka
- Annual budget: Rs 35,402,210 million (2015 est)
- Minister responsible: Anura Karunathilake, Minister Urban Development, Water Supply and Drainage
- Agency executives: Ranjit Fernando, Chairman; K. Hettiarachchi, Secretary
- Child agencies: Urban Development Authority; Sri Lanka Land, Reclamation and Development Corporation; National Water Supply; Department of National Community Water Supply
- Website: Official website

The Ministry of Urban Development is the Sri Lankan government ministry responsible for planning and implementation of Economic social and physical development of the areas declared by the Minister-in-charge of the subject of Urban development. The ministry was established by an Act of parliament bearing No 41 of 1978. The Urban Development Authority is executively functioning under this ministry that is responsible for empowering to function as the key urban planning and implementing agency of the country.

== History ==
The Urban Development Authority was established by Junius R. Jayewardene on 1978 under Act of Parliament bearing No 41 with a perspective to advance incorporated arranging and execution of Economic social and physical improvement of the ranges pronounced by responsible Minister-in-charge of the Urban Development.

== Departments ==
1. Urban Development Authority Nimesh Herath is the current Chairman of the Urban Development Authority of Sri Lanka.
2. Ministry of Urban Development & Housing.
3. Sri Lanka Land Reclamation and Development Corporation and its subsidiaries headed by M. H. M. Salman.
4. National Water Supply and its subsidiaries headed by K. Alahudeen Ansar
5. Department of National Community Water Supply and its subsidiaries headed by Eng.Karunasena Hettiarachchi

== Ministers ==
Parties

Sri Lanka Freedom Party United National Party Sri Lanka Muslim Congress Mahajana Eksath Peramuna Sri Lanka Podujana Peramuna National People's Power

| Name | Portrait | Party | Tenure | Head(s) of Government | Ministerial title |
|---|---|---|---|---|---|
| C. Rajadurai | | United National Party | 5 April 1979 - 10 November 1988 | J.R Jayawardene | Minister of Regional Development |
| Gamini Atukorale | | United National Party | 14 March 1991 - 7 October 1994 | Ranasinghe Premadasa | Minister of Land Irrigation & Mahaweli Development |
| Dinesh Gunawardena | | Mahajana Eksath Peramuna | 10 April 2004 - 19 November 2005 | Chandrika Kumaratunga | Minister of Urban Development and Water Supply |
| Dinesh Gunawardena | | Mahajana Eksath Peramuna | 23 November 2005 - 29 January 2007 | Mahinda Rajapaksa | Minister of Urban Development and Water Supply |
| Dinesh Gunawardena | | Mahajana Eksath Peramuna | 29 January 2007 - 23 April 2010 | Mahinda Rajapaksa | Minister of Urban Development and Sacred Area Development |
| Mahinda Rajapaksa | | Sri Lanka Freedom Party | 19 November 2005 - 9 January 2015 | Mahinda Rajapaksa | Minister of Defence and Urban Development |
| Rauff Hakeem | | Sri Lanka Muslim Congress | 12 January 2015 - 17 August 2015 | Maithripala Sirisena | Minister of Urban Development, Water Supply and Drainage |
| Rauff Hakeem | | Sri Lanka Muslim Congress | 4 September 2015 – 17 June 2019 | Maithripala Sirisena | Minister of Urban Planning and Water Supply |
| Vijitha Herath | | National People's Power | 24 September 2024 – 18 November 2024 | Anura Kumara Dissanayake | Minister of Rural and Urban Development, and Housing and Construction |
| Anura Karunathilake | | National People's Power | 18 November 2024 – Incumbent | Anura Kumara Dissanayake | Minister of Urban Development, Construction and Housing |
