= Susil Premajayantha =

Sri Lankan politician

Hon. Susil Premajayantha
- Susil Premajayantha சுசில் பிரேமஜயந்த
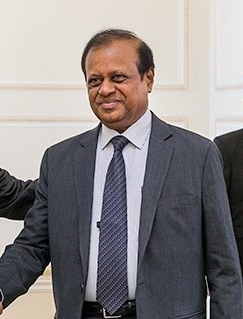

Leader of the House
- In office 27 July 2022 – 24 September 2024
- President: Ranil Wickremesinghe
- Prime Minister: Dinesh Gunawardena
- Preceded by: Dinesh Gunawardena
- Succeeded by: Bimal Rathnayake

Minister of Education
- In office 20 May 2022 – 23 September 2024
- President: Gotabaya Rajapaksa; Ranil Wickramasinghe
- Prime Minister: Ranil Wickramasinghe; Dinesh Gunawardena
- Preceded by: Ramesh Pathirana
- Succeeded by: Harini Amarasuriya
- In office 23 November 2005 – 23 April 2010
- President: Mahinda Rajapaksa
- Prime Minister: Ratnasiri Wickremanayake
- Succeeded by: Bandula Gunawardane
- In office 2000–2001
- President: Chandrika Kumaratunga
- Prime Minister: Ratnasiri Wickremanayake
- Preceded by: Richard Pathirana
- Succeeded by: Sarath Amunugama

Minister of Technology and Research (Note: Portfolio changed names from Minister of Technology, Technical Education and Employment, on 21 September 2015, but still the same ministry)
- In office 4 September 2015 – 12 April 2018
- President: Maithripala Sirisena
- Prime Minister: Ranil Wickremesinghe
- Preceded by: Champika Ranawaka
- Succeeded by: Gotabaya Rajapaksa

Minister of Environment and Renewable Energy
- In office 28 January 2013 – 12 January 2015
- President: Mahinda Rajapaksa
- Prime Minister: D. M. Jayaratne
- Succeeded by: Maithripala Sirisena

Minister of Petroleum Industries
- In office 23 April 2010 – 28 January 2013
- President: Mahinda Rajapaksa
- Prime Minister: D. M. Jayaratne
- Succeeded by: Anura Priyadharshana Yapa

Minister of Power and Energy
- In office 10 April 2004 – 23 November 2005
- President: Chandrika Kumaratunga
- Prime Minister: Mahinda Rajapaksa
- Preceded by: Karu Jayasuriya
- Succeeded by: John Seneviratne

General Secretary of the United People's Freedom Alliance
- In office 20 January 2004 – 14 August 2015
- Leader: Maithripala Sirisena; Mahinda Rajapaksa; Chandrika Kumaratunga
- Preceded by: Office Created
- Succeeded by: Wiswa Warnapala

Member of Parliament for Colombo District
- In office 2001–2024

Member of Parliament for Gampaha District
- In office 2000–2001

Personal details
- Born: 10 January 1955 (age 71) Dominion of Ceylon
- Party: Sri Lanka Podujana Peramuna (2018 - Present); Sri Lanka Freedom Party (Until 2018)
- Other political affiliations: Sri Lanka People's Freedom Alliance (2020–present); United People's Freedom Alliance (2004–2018); People's Alliance (until 2004)
- Education: St. John's College, Nugegoda

Achchige Don Susil Premajayantha (born 10 January 1955) is a Sri Lankan politician, former cabinet minister and a member of the Parliament of Sri Lanka.

== Education ==
Premajayantha received his primary and secondary education at St. John's College, Nugegoda. After that he attended the University of Colombo and received a Bachelor of Laws in 1982 and became an Attorney at Law in 1984. Later on in 2004 he also gained a Masters in Public Administration from the University of Sri Jayewardenepura.

== Political career ==
Premajayantha began his political career in 1991 being elected as the Deputy Chairman of Sri Jayewardenepura Kotte Urban Council. In 1993 he was elected to the Western Provincial Council and was elected Chief Minister in 1995.

In 2000 he entered parliament for the first time from Gampaha District and became the Minister of Education. Even though the People's Alliance was defeated in the 2001 general elections, Premajayantha was elected back into the Parliament from Colombo District and held his seat in subsequent elections.

With the formation of the United People's Freedom Alliance in 2004, Premajayantha was made its inaugural General Secretary of the party. When the United People's Freedom Alliance won the 2004 general elections he was given the post of Minister of Power and Energy When Mahinda Rajapaksa became president, he was again appointed Minister of Education and after the 2010 general elections as the Minister of Petroleum Industries and in a 2013 cabinet reshuffle he became the Minister of Environment and Renewable Energy.

On 25 August 2015, few days after general elections he resigned as the General Secretary of the United People's Freedom Alliance. Few days prior to the elections he was removed from the position by the party Chairman, President Maithripala Sirisena. After the Sri Lanka Freedom Party and United National Party signed a Memorandum of Understanding to form a National unity government, Premajayantha became the Minister of Technology and Research. He was reappointed the Minister of Education on 20 May 2022 by President Gotabaya Rajapaksa and again by President Ranil Wickramasinghe on 23 July 2022.

== See also ==
- Cabinet of Sri Lanka
