= Leco =

Leco or LECO may refer to:

- Lanka Electricity Company, a utility company in Sri Lanka
- Leco language, a language isolate spoken in areas east of Lake Titicaca, Bolivia
- LECO Corporation, an American analytical instrumentation research company
- Lincoln Electric, an American multinational and global manufacturer with Nasdaq stock symbol LECO
- A Coruña Airport, in northwestern Spain by ICAO airport code
- Leco (sporting director) (born 1938), Carlos Augusto de Barros e Silva, Brazilian lawyer and sports executive
