= Nandika Sanath Kumanayake =

Dr Nandika Sanath Kumanayake
- නන්දික සනත් කුමානායක

Secretary to the President of Sri Lanka
- Incumbent
- Assumed office 2024
- Preceded by: Saman Ekanayake

Personal details
- Education: University of Kelaniya

Nandika Sanath Kumanayake (Sinhala: නන්දික සනත් කුමානායක) is the current Secretary to the President of Sri Lanka.

== Career ==
Kumanayake joined the civil service as an Assistant Superintendent of Sri Lanka Customs in 1997. He was appointed Secretary to the President, the de-facto head of Sri Lanka's civil service after the election of Anura Kumara Dissanayake in 2024. He was a Deputy Director of Customs at the time of appointment.
