= Kumara Jayakody =

Sri Lankan politician (born 1967)

Hon. Kumara Jayakody MP
- කුමාර ජයකොඩි குமார ஜயகொடி

Minister of Energy
- In office 18 November 2024 – 17 April 2026
- President: Anura Kumara Dissanayake
- Prime Minister: Harini Amarasuriya
- Preceded by: Anura Kumara Dissanayake
- Succeeded by: Anura Karunathilake

Member of Parliament for National List
- Incumbent
- Assumed office 21 November 2024

Personal details
- Born: Punya Sri Kumara Jayakody; 26 March 1967 (age 59)
- Party: National People's Power
- Profession: Engineer

Punya Sri Kumara Jayakody (born 26 March 1967) is a Sri Lankan politician and an engineer, who served as the Minister of Energy of the Government of Sri Lanka from 18 November 2024 to 17 April 2026. He is a member of the Parliament of Sri Lanka from National list since 21 November 2024 as a member of the National People's Power. He is a member of the National People's Power (NPP), and also a national executive committee member of NPP.

== Career ==
Jayakody graduated from the University of Peradeniya with a degree in Engineering. He worked in the Ceylon Fertilizer Company. Having served as a national executive member of the NPP, he was appointed following the general election victory of President Anura Kumara Dissanayake's leftist coalition. Jayakody entered Parliament via the National List on 21 November 2024, representing the National People's Power (NPP). He was thereafter appointed by President Dissanayake as Minister of Energy.

On 17 April 2026, Jayakody resigned from his ministerial position to facilitate an impartial and independent inquiry into controversial coal imports.

== Controversies ==
=== Influencing government procurement process ===
On 27 March 2026, Jayakody was served with indictments before the Colombo High Court in connection with allegations of corruption that caused a loss of Rs. 8,859,708 (approximately US$28,218) to the government in 2016. The charges were filed by the Commission to Investigate Allegations of Bribery or Corruption (CIABOC), alleging that in 2016, while serving as manager of the Procurement and Import Division of the Ceylon Fertilizer Company, he committed an offence of corruption by influencing a procurement process.

=== Coal procurement ===
Jayakody was associated with the controversy surrounding coal procurement for power generation in Sri Lanka for the 2025–2026 season. Concerns have been raised about the tendering process, pricing and the quality of coal imports supplied to the Lakvijaya Power Station. Opposition politicians, critics and industry stakeholders have alleged irregularities and a lack of transparency in the procurement process. In response, Jayakody and the government maintained that proper procedures had been followed and that the procurement process complied with relevant regulations.

A special audit report released on 2 April 2026 by the National Audit Office stated that multiple irregularities occurred during the procurement process. On 7 April 2026, President Anura Kumara Dissanayake stated in an address to Parliament that coal procured in the recent past was of inferior quality, affecting power generation output and increasing energy costs. International Monetary Fund mission chief for Sri Lanka, Evan Papageorgiou, also commented on this situation at an event in Colombo on 9 April 2026.

A motion of no confidence was presented by the Samagi Jana Balawegaya against Jayakody on 19 March 2026. The motion was debated on 10 April 2026 and was defeated by a majority of 104 votes, with 153 members voting against and 43 in favour.

Political offices
Preceded by Anura Kumara Dissanayake	Minister of Energy; November 2024–2026	Succeeded by Anura Karunathilake
