= Bimal Rathnayake =

Sri Lankan politician

Hon. Bimal Rathnayake MP
- බිමල් රත්නායක பிமல் ரத்நாயக்க

Minister of Transport, Highways and Urban Development
- Incumbent
- Assumed office 18 November 2024
- President: Anura Kumara Dissanayake
- Prime Minister: Harini Amarasuriya
- Preceded by: Vijitha Herath

Leader of the House
- Incumbent
- Assumed office 21 November 2024
- President: Anura Kumara Dissanayake
- Prime Minister: Harini Amarasuriya
- Preceded by: Susil Premajayantha

Member of Parliament for National List
- Incumbent
- Assumed office 21 November 2024
- In office 3 September 2015 – 3 March 2020

Member of Parliament for Kurunegala District
- In office 2001–2010

Personal details
- Born: 28 March 1973 (age 53)
- Party: Janatha Vimukthi Peramuna
- Other political affiliations: National People's Power
- Spouse: Samanmalee Gunasinghe

Bimal Rathnayake is a Sri Lankan politician who serves as the Minister of Transport, Highways and Urban Development and Leader of the House since November 2024. A longstanding member of the Janatha Vimukthi Peramuna (JVP), Rathnayake is member of the JVP Politburo, a national executive member of National People's Power (NPP) and a member of the Parliament of Sri Lanka for the National List.

He studied at Tangalle Primary College, Ananda College, Colombo and was selected to study civil engineering at the University of Moratuwa in 1993, however did not complete his degree. His academic qualifications have been listed as BSc. Engineering Undergraduate in parliament.

Rathnayake was first elected to parliament from Kurunagala in 2001 and served till 2010, when he lost his seat and had served as the Deputy Minister of Agriculture, Livestock, Land and Irrigation from 2004 to 2005 under President Kumaratunga’s government. He was appointed to parliament in 2015 after Sarath Chandrasiri Mayadunne two days into his term and served till 2000, when he again lost his seat. He was the JVP’s National Organiser He was the organiser of the Socialist Youth Union and a member of the Central Committee of the JVP.

His wife, Samanmalee Gunasinghe, is a Central Committee member of the JVP and was elected in the 2024 Sri Lankan parliamentary election from Colombo from the NPP, while Rathnayake was elected as the first NPP national list candidate.

== Electoral history ==
Election	Constituency	Party	Alliance	Votes	Result
2001 parliamentary	Kurunegala District	JVP		4,240	Elected
2004 parliamentary	Kurunegala District	JVP	UPFA	116,736	Elected
2010 parliamentary	Kurunegala District	JVP	DNA		Not elected
