= Ministry of Technology (Sri Lanka) =

Government ministry of Sri Lanka

Ministry of Digital Economy
- ඩිජිටල් ආර්ථික අමාත්‍යාංශය டிஜிட்டல் பொருளாதார அமைச்சகம்

Ministry overview
- Jurisdiction: Government of Sri Lanka
- Headquarters: Level 11, Unit No. 1101, One Galle Face Tower, No. 1 A, Centre Road, Galle Face, Colombo 02; 6°55′40″N 79°50′43″E
- Annual budget: ▲LKR 7.1 billion (2025)
- Minister responsible: Anura Kumara Dissanayake, Minister of Digital Economy
- Ministry executive: Waruna Sri Dhanapala, Secretary
- Child agencies: Information and Communication Technology Agency of Sri Lanka (ICTA); Sri Lanka Computer Emergency Readiness Team (SLCERT); Sri Lanka Telecom PLC (SLTMobitel); Telecom Regulatory Commission of Sri Lanka (TRCSL); Department for Registration of Persons (DRP); Data Protection Authority (DPA)
- Website: mot.gov.lk; mode.gov.lk

The Ministry of Technology, currently known as the Ministry of Digital Economy, is a cabinet ministry of the Government of Sri Lanka responsible for formulating and implementing policies on the development, regulation, and advancement of technology and scientific research in the country.

In the 2025 budget, the Sri Lankan government made a significant push towards a digital economy. President Anura Kumara Dissanayake announced the establishment of a Digital Economic Authority and a Sri Lanka Unique Identity Project (Digital ID) as key components of this initiative. The government allocated LKR 3 billion towards digital investments.

The goal is to transition Sri Lanka into a cashless economy and to generate US $15 billion in revenue through the digital economy by 2030. This includes increasing the ICT industry’s annual export revenue to US $5 billion. The budget also includes plans to strengthen cybersecurity, data privacy, and data protection laws

== List of ministers ==
The Minister of Technology or the Minister of Digital Economy is an appointment in the Cabinet of Sri Lanka.

Parties

Sri Lanka Freedom Party
Jathika Hela Urumaya
Sri Lanka Podujana Peramuna
United National Party
National People's Power

Name	Portrait	Party	Tenure	President
Patali Champika Ranawaka		Jathika Hela Urumaya	28 January 2013 – 18 November 2014	Mahinda Rajapaksa
Susil Premajayanth		Sri Lanka Freedom Party	4 September 2015 – 12 April 2018	Maithripala Sirisena
Gotabaya Rajapaksa		Sri Lanka Podujana Peramuna	26 November 2020 – 14 July 2022	Gotabaya Rajapaksa
Ranil Wickramasinghe		United National Party	21 July 2022 – 23 September 2024	Ranil Wickramasinghe
Harini Amarasuriya		National People's Power	24 September 2024 – 18 November 2024	Anura Kumara Dissanayake
Anura Kumara Dissanayake		National People's Power	18 November 2024 – Present	Anura Kumara Dissanayake

== See also ==
- List of universities in Sri Lanka
- Research in Sri Lanka
