= Nalinda Jayatissa =

Sri Lanka politician

Hon. Dr. Nalinda Jayatissa MP
- නලින්ද ජයතිස්ස நளிந்த ஜயதிஸ்ஸ
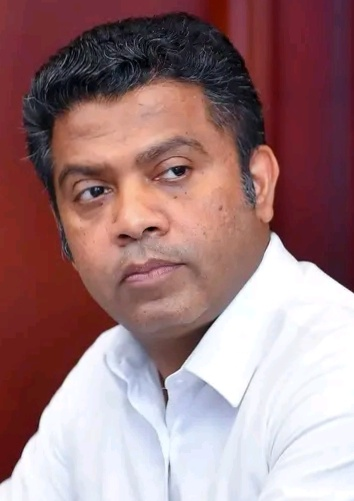
- Jayatissa in 2026

Minister of Health and Mass Media
- Incumbent
- Assumed office 18 November 2024
- President: Anura Kumara Dissanayake
- Prime Minister: Harini Amarasuriya
- Preceded by: Harini Amarasuriya

Chief Government Whip
- Incumbent
- Assumed office 21 November 2024
- President: Anura Kumara Dissanayake
- Prime Minister: Harini Amarasuriya
- Preceded by: Prasanna Ranatunga

Cabinet Spokesperson of Sri Lanka
- Incumbent
- Assumed office 19 November 2024
- President: Anura Kumara Dissanayake
- Prime Minister: Harini Amarasuriya
- Preceded by: Vijitha Herath

Member of Parliament for Kalutara District
- Incumbent
- Assumed office 21 November 2024
- Majority: 371,640 Preferential votes
- In office 1 September 2015 – 3 March 2020

Personal details
- Born: 21 April 1977 (age 49)
- Party: Janatha Vimukthi Peramuna
- Other political affiliations: National People's Power
- Education: C. W. W. Kannangara MMV, Matugama, Polegoda MV, Mahagama; University of Sri Jayawardenepura
- Occupation: Politician
- Profession: Medical Doctor

Walakada Appuhamilage Nalinda Wajiramal Jayatissa (known as Nalinda Jayatissa born 21 April 1977) is a Sri Lankan politician who serves as the Minister of Health and Mass Media, Chief Government Whip and Cabinet Spokesperson of Sri Lanka since November 2024. A member of the National People's Power, he was elected to the Parliament of Sri Lanka in 2024 from Kalutara District. He was previously elected from Kalutara District in 2015 and lost at 2020 election. He is also a member of the Janatha Vimukthi Peramuna.

He is qualified and has practised as a medical doctor. Jayatissa was elected to the Western Provincial Council from the Janatha Vimukthi Peramuna, serving two terms from 2009 to 2014 and from 2014 to 2019.
