= Ministry of Buddha Sasana, Religious and Cultural Affairs =

Government ministry of Sri Lanka

- බුද්ධශාසන, ආගමික හා සංස්කෘතික කටයුතු අමාත්‍යාංශය புத்தசாசன, சமய மற்றும் கலாசார அலுவல்கள் அமைச்சு

Ministry overview
- Jurisdiction: Government of Sri Lanka
- Headquarters: 135 Srimath Anagarika Dharmapala road, Colombo 7; 6.914409°N 79.858778°E
- Minister responsible: Hiniduma Sunil Senevi, Minister of Buddha Sasana, Religious and Cultural Affairs
- Ministry executive: Chandraprema Gamage, Ministry Secretary
- Website: mbs.gov.lk

The Ministry of Buddha Sasana, Religious and Cultural Affairs (Sinhala: බුද්ධශාසන, ආගමික හා සංස්කෘතික කටයුතු අමාත්‍යාංශය; Tamil: புத்தசாசன, சமய மற்றும் கலாசார அலுவல்கள் அமைச்சு) is a cabinet ministry of the Government of Sri Lanka. It is responsible for oversight of the country's de facto state religion, Theravada Buddhism by:

- General oversight and maintenance of the welfare of the nation's Buddhist clergy and places of worship
- Oversight of Buddhist education in the country, including provision of information technology to temples
- The development of temples as community centres with multiple services outside of matters spiritual
- Maintenance of selected places of Buddhist worship as tourist sites, and maintenance of sites of Buddhist pilgrimage
- The propagation of Buddhism and Buddhist philosophy
- Maintaining the nature of the Buddhist state via necessary legislation

== List of ministers ==
Parties

Sri Lanka Freedom Party United National Party Pivithuru Hela Urumaya Sri Lanka Podujana Peramuna National People's Power

Name	Portrait	Party	Took office	Left office	President
W. J. M. Lokubandara		United National Party	12 December 2001	9 April 2004	Chandrika Kumaratunga
Mahinda Rajapaksa		Sri Lanka Freedom Party	25 November 2005	23 April 2010	Mahinda Rajapaksa
D. M. Jayaratne		Sri Lanka Freedom Party	23 April 2010	9 January 2015	Mahinda Rajapaksa
Karu Jayasuriya		United National Party	12 January 2015	17 August 2015	Maithripala Sirisena
Wijeyadasa Rajapakshe		United National Party	4 September 2015	23 August 2017	Maithripala Sirisena
Gamini Jayawickrama Perera		United National Party	25 August 2017	26 October 2018	Maithripala Sirisena
Udaya Gammanpila		Pivithuru Hela Urumaya	9 November 2018	15 December 2018	Maithripala Sirisena
Gamini Jayawickrama Perera		United National Party	28 December 2018	21 November 2019	Maithripala Sirisena
Mahinda Rajapaksa		Sri Lanka Podujana Peramuna	22 November 2019	9 May 2022	Gotabaya Rajapaksa
Vidura Wickremanayake		Sri Lanka Podujana Peramuna	20 May 2022	14 July 2022	Gotabaya Rajapaksa
Vidura Wickremanayake		Sri Lanka Podujana Peramuna	22 July 2022	24 September 2024	Ranil Wickremesinghe
Vijitha Herath		National People's Power	24 September 2024	18 November 2024	Anura Kumara Dissanayake
Hiniduma Sunil Senevi		National People's Power	18 November 2024	Incumbent	Anura Kumara Dissanayake

== See also ==
- Buddhism in Sri Lanka
- Religion in Sri Lanka
