= Chandana Abayarathna =

Home Minister of Sri Lanka since 2024

Hon. Chandana Abayarathna MP
- චන්දන අබේරත්න சந்தன அபேரத்ன

Minister of State Administration, Provincial Councils and Local Government
- Incumbent
- Assumed office 18 November 2024
- President: Anura Kumara Dissanayake
- Prime Minister: Harini Amarasuriya
- Preceded by: Harini Amarasuriya

Member of Parliament for Puttalam District
- Incumbent
- Assumed office 21 November 2024
- Majority: 113,334 Preferential votes

Personal details
- Party: National People's Power
- Profession: Academic

Chandana Abayarathna is a Sri Lankan politician currently serving as the Minister of State Administration, Provincial Councils and Local Government. He was elected to the Sri Lankan Parliament from Puttalam Electoral District as a member of the National People's Power in 2024 Sri Lankan parliamentary election.
