= List of ministries of Sri Lanka =

The parliament of the Sri Lanka has set of ministers. They are categorized either as the ministers of cabinet and non cabinet. According to the 19th amendment the number of cabinet ministers is limited to 28.

== List of ministries ==
- Ministry of Defence
  - Minister of Defence
- Ministry of Finance, Economic Stabilization and National Policies
  - Minister of Finance, Economic Stabilization and National Policies
- Ministry of Technology
  - Minister of Technology
- Ministry of Women, Child Affairs and Social Empowerment
  - Minister of Women, Child Affairs and Social Empowerment
- Ministry of Ports, Shipping and Aviation
  - Minister of Ports, Shipping and Aviation
- Ministry of Investment Promotion
  - Minister of Investment Promotion
- Ministry of Public Administration, Home Affairs, Provincial Councils and Local Government
  - Minister of Public Administration, Home Affairs, Provincial Councils and Local Government
- Ministry of Fisheries
  - Minister of Fisheries
- Ministry of Education
  - Minister of Education
- Ministry of Transport and Highways
  - Minister of Transport and Highways
- Ministry of Mass Media
  - Minister of Mass Media
- Ministry of Health
  - Minister of Health
- Ministry of Water Supply
  - Minister of Water Supply
- Ministry of Agriculture
  - Minister of Agriculture
- Ministry of Wildlife and Forest Resources Conservation
  - Minister of Wildlife and Forest Resources Conservation
- Ministry of Justice, Prisons Affairs and Constitutional Reforms
  - Minister of Justice, Prisons Affairs and Constitutional Reforms
- Ministry of Tourism and Lands
  - Minister of Tourism and Lands
- Ministry of Plantation Industries
  - Minister of Plantation Industries
- Ministry of Industries
  - Minister of Industries
- Ministry of Urban Development and Housing
  - Minister of Urban Development and Housing
- Ministry of Foreign Affairs
  - Minister of Foreign Affairs
- Ministry of Buddha Sasana, Religious and Cultural Affairs
  - Minister of Buddha Sasana, Religious and Cultural Affairs
- Ministry of Power and Energy
  - Minister of Power and Energy
- Ministry of Environment
  - Minister of Environment
- Ministry of Sports and Youth Affairs
  - Minister of Sports and Youth Affairs
- Ministry of Irrigation
  - Minister of Irrigation
- Ministry of Labour and Foreign Employment
  - Minister of Labour and Foreign Employment
- Ministry of Public Security
  - Minister of Public Security
- Ministry of Trade, Commerce and Food Security
  - Minister of Trade, Commerce and Food Security

== Former ministries ==
- Ministry of Economic Development
- Ministry of External Affairs and Defence
- Ministry of Highways, Ports & Shipping (briefly Ministry of Highways and Investment Promotion)
- Ministry of Livestock and Rural Community Development
- Ministry of Parliamentary Affairs
- Ministry of Productivity Promotion
- Ministry of Traditional Industries and Small Enterprise Development

== See also ==
- Cabinet of Sri Lanka
- Presidential Secretariat
- Cabinet Office (Sri Lanka)
