= Nishantha Jayaweera =

Sri Lankan politician (born 1969)

Hon. Nishantha Jayaweera MP
- නිශාාන්ත ජයවීර நிஷாந்தா ஜெயவீரா

Member of Parliament for National List
- Incumbent
- Assumed office 9 July 2025
- Preceded by: Harshana Suriyapperuma

Personal details
- Born: Ushettige Don Nishantha Jayaweera; 15 January 1969 (age 57)
- Party: National People's Power

Ushettige Don Nishantha Jayaweera (born 15 January 1969) is a Sri Lankan politician. He was nominated as a Member of Parliament from the National list on 7 July 2025 by the National People's Power, replacing Harshana Suriyapperuma who had earlier resigned from his seat on 20 June.

His appointment was confirmed by the Election Commission on 7 July 2025 and was sworn in on 9 July.
