= Ministry of Environment (Sri Lanka) =

Government ministry of Sri Lanka

- පරිසර අමාත්‍යාංශය சுற்றாடல் அமைச்சு

Ministry overview
- Jurisdiction: Government of Sri Lanka
- Headquarters: Sobadam Piyasa, No. 416/C/1, Robert Gunawardana Mawatha, Battaramulla; 6.899938°N 79.914449°E
- Minister responsible: Hon. Dr. Dammika Patabendi, Minister of Environment
- Ministry executive: K. R. Uduwawala, Ministry Secretary
- Child agencies: Central Environmental Authority; Mahaweli Authority
- Website: env.gov.lk

The Ministry of Environment (Sinhala: පරිසර අමාත්‍යාංශය; Tamil: சுற்றாடல் அமைச்சு) is the cabinet ministry of the Government of Sri Lanka with oversight of the environment and the Mahaweli Development programme, as well as the general development of the Mahaweli River, its environs and communities living within defined 'Mahaweli development zones'.

== List of ministers ==
Parties

United National Party Sri Lanka Freedom Party Sri Lanka Muslim Congress Sri Lanka Podujana Peramuna National People's Power

Name	Portrait	Party	Tenure		President
Rukman Senanayake		United National Party	12 December 2001	24 August 2024	Chandrika Kumaratunga
A. H. M. Fowzie		Sri Lanka Freedom Party	10 April 2004	19 November 2005	Chandrika Kumaratunga
Maithripala Sirisena	Maithripala Sirisena	Sri Lanka Freedom Party	23 November 2005	28 January 2007	Mahinda Rajapaksa
Anura Priyadharshana Yapa		Sri Lanka Freedom Party	23 April 2010	28 January 2013	Mahinda Rajapaksa
Susil Premajayanth		Sri Lanka Freedom Party	28 January 2013	12 January 2015	Mahinda Rajapaksa
Maithripala Sirisena	Maithripala Sirisena	Sri Lanka Freedom Party	12 January 2015	18 November 2019	Maithripala Sirisena
S. M. Chandrasena		Sri Lanka Freedom Party	22 November 2019	12 August 2020	Gotabaya Rajapaksa
Ahamed Nazeer Zainulabdeen		Sri Lanka Muslim Congress	12 April 2022	14 July 2022	Gotabaya Rajapaksa
Ahamed Nazeer Zainulabdeen		Sri Lanka Muslim Congress	22 July 2022	6 October 2023	Ranil Wickremesinghe
Keheliya Rambukwella		Sri Lanka Podujana Peramuna	23 October 2023	3 February 2024	Ranil Wickremesinghe
Vijitha Herath		National People's Power	24 September 2024	18 November 2024	Anura Kumara Dissanayake
Dammika Patabendi		National People's Power	18 November 2024	Incumbent	Anura Kumara Dissanayake
