= Ministry of Agriculture (Sri Lanka) =

Government ministry of Sri Lanka

- කෘෂිකර්ම අමාත්‍යාංශය கமத்தொழில் அமைச்சு

Ministry overview
- Formed: 1931; 95 years ago
- Jurisdiction: Government of Sri Lanka
- Headquarters: Govijana Mandiraya, 80/5 Rajamalwatta Avenue, Battaramulla, Colombo; 6°54′00.30″N 79°54′56.30″E
- Annual budget: Rs. 50 billion (2016, recurrent); Rs. 4 billion (2016, capital)
- Minister responsible: K. D. Lalkantha, Minister of Agriculture
- Ministry executive: B. Wijayaratne, Secretary
- Child agencies: Agriculture and Agrarian Insurance Board; Ceylon Fertilizer Company Limited; Colombo Commercial Fertilizer Company; Department of Agrarian Development; Department of Agriculture; Hector Kobbekaduwa Agrarian Research & Training Institute; Institute of Post‐Harvest Technology; Janatha Fertilizer Enterprises Limited; Lanka Phosphate Company Limited; National Fertilizer Secretariat; Pulses & Grain Research & Production Authority; Sri Lanka Council for Agricultural Research Policy; Sri Lanka National Freedom from Hunger Campaign Board
- Website: agrimin.gov.lk

The Ministry of Agriculture (Sinhala: කෘෂිකර්ම අමාත්‍යාංශය; Tamil: கமத்தொழில் அமைச்சு) is the central government ministry of Sri Lanka responsible for agriculture. The ministry is responsible for formulating and implementing national policy on home affairs and other subjects which come under its purview. The current Minister of Agriculture is President K. D. Lalkantha. The ministry's secretary is D. P. Wickremasinghe.

== Ministers ==
The Minister of Agriculture is a member of the Cabinet of Sri Lanka.

Parties

Governors of British Ceylon United National Party Sri Lanka Freedom Party Viplavakari Lanka Sama Samaja Party Eelam People's Democratic Party Sri Lanka Podujana Peramuna National People's Power

Ministers of Agriculture
Name	Portrait	Party	Took office	Left office	Head of government	Ministerial title	Refs
D. S. Senanayake		United National Party	1931	1946	Henry Monck-Mason Moore	Minister of Agriculture and Lands	
Dudley Senanayake		United National Party	1946	1947	Henry Monck-Mason Moore	Minister of Agriculture and Lands	
Dudley Senanayake		United National Party	26 September 1947	26 March 1952	D. S. Senanayake	Minister of Agriculture and Lands	
P. B. Bulankulame			26 March 1952	1952	Dudley Senanayake	Minister of Agriculture and Lands	
Senator Oliver Goonetilleke			19 June 1952		Dudley Senanayake	Minister of Agriculture and Food	
J. R. Jayewardene		United National Party	1953		John Kotelawala	Minister of Agriculture and Food	
Philip Gunawardena		Viplavakari Lanka Sama Samaja Party	12 April 1956	18 May 1959	S. W. R. D. Bandaranaike	Minister of Agriculture and Food	
C. P. de Silva		Sri Lanka Freedom Party	9 June 1959		S. W. R. D. Bandaranaike	Minister of Agriculture	
C. P. de Silva		Sri Lanka Freedom Party		December 1959	Wijeyananda Dahanayake	Minister of Agriculture and Lands	
M. D. Banda		United National Party	23 March 1960	1960	Dudley Senanayake	Minister of Agriculture and Lands	
C. P. de Silva		Sri Lanka Freedom Party	23 July 1960		Sirimavo Bandaranaike	Minister of Agriculture, Land, Irrigation and Power	
Felix Dias Bandaranaike		Sri Lanka Freedom Party	28 May 1963		Sirimavo Bandaranaike	Minister of Agriculture, Food and Co-operative Development	
M. D. Banda		United National Party			Dudley Senanayake	Minister of Agriculture and Food	
Hector Kobbekaduwa		Sri Lanka Freedom Party			Sirimavo Bandaranaike	Minister of Agriculture and Lands	
Lionel Senanayake		United National Party	13 July 1977		J. R. Jayewardene	Minister of Agriculture and Lands	
D. B. Wijetunga		United National Party			J. R. Jayewardene	Minister of Food, Agricultural Development and Research	
Lalith Athulathmudali		United National Party	18 February 1989		Ranasinghe Premadasa	Minister of Agriculture, Food and Cooperatives	
R. M. Dharmadasa Banda		United National Party	1990		Ranasinghe Premadasa	Minister of Agriculture & Research	
D. M. Jayaratne		Sri Lanka Freedom Party	19 August 1994		D. B. Wijetunga	Minister of Agriculture, Land and Forestry Conservation	
D. M. Jayaratne		Sri Lanka Freedom Party	19 October 2000	14 September 2001	Chandrika Kumaratunga	Minister of Agriculture	
D. M. Jayaratne		Sri Lanka Freedom Party	14 September 2001		Chandrika Kumaratunga	Minister of Agriculture, Forestry, Food and Cooperative Development	
S. B. Dissanayake		United National Party	12 December 2001		Chandrika Kumaratunga	Minister of Agriculture, Livestock and Welfare	
Anura Kumara Dissanayake		Janatha Vimukthi Peramuna	10 April 2004		Chandrika Kumaratunga	Minister of Agricultural	
Ratnasiri Wickremanayake		Sri Lanka Freedom Party	27 July 2005		Chandrika Kumaratunga	Minister of Agriculture	
Maithripala Sirisena		Sri Lanka Freedom Party	23 November 2005		Mahinda Rajapaksa	Minister of Agriculture, Environment, Irrigation and Mahaweli Development	
Maithripala Sirisena		Sri Lanka Freedom Party	28 January 2007		Mahinda Rajapaksa	Minister of Agricultural Development and Agrarian Services	
Mahinda Yapa Abeywardena		Sri Lanka Freedom Party	23 April 2010		Mahinda Rajapaksa	Minister of Agriculture	
Duminda Dissanayake		Sri Lanka Freedom Party	12 January 2015	22 March 2015	Maithripala Sirisena	Minister of Irrigation and Agriculture	
Duminda Dissanayake		Sri Lanka Freedom Party	22 March 2015	1 May 2018	Maithripala Sirisena	Minister of Agriculture	
Mahinda Amaraweera		Sri Lanka Freedom Party	29 October 2018	15 December 2018	Maithripala Sirisena	Minister of Agriculture	
P. Harrison		United National Party	20 December 2018	21 November 2019	Maithripala Sirisena	Minister of Agriculture, Rural Economic Affairs, Livestock Development, Irrigation, Fisheries and Aquatic Resources Development	
Mahindananda Aluthgamage		Sri Lanka Podujana Peramuna	12 August 2020	3 April 2022	Gotabaya Rajapaksa	Minister of Agriculture	
Janaka Wakkumbura		Sri Lanka Podujana Peramuna	18 April 2022	9 May 2022	Gotabaya Rajapaksa	Minister of Agriculture	
Mahinda Amaraweera		Sri Lanka Podujana Peramuna	12 May 2022	23 September 2024	Gotabaya Rajapaksa	Minister of Agriculture	
Mahinda Amaraweera		Sri Lanka Podujana Peramuna	12 May 2022	23 September 2024	Ranil Wickremesinghe	Minister of Agriculture and Plantation Industries	
Anura Kumara Dissanayake		National People's Power	24 September 2024	18 November 2024	Anura Kumara Dissanayake	Minister of Agriculture, Land, Livestock, Irrigation, Fisheries and Aquatic Resources	
K. D. Lalkantha		National People's Power	18 November 2024	Incumbent	Anura Kumara Dissanayake	Minister of Agriculture, Livestock, Land and Irrigation	

== Key objectives ==
The key objective of the Ministry of agriculture is to:

- Supportive agricultural policy for food and allied agricultural crops,
- Established food and nutrition security,
- Stable prices for agricultural products,
- Efficiently coordinated paddy purchasing and marketing programme,
- Timely implementation of projects, Increase production in selected crops,
- Efficient and effective implementation of accelerated food production programme,
- Efficient and effective use of foreign funds,
- Customer friendly and result oriented administrative system,
- Results-based management in entire government sector. 65

== Secretaries ==
Agriculture Secretaries
Name	Took office	Left office	Title	Refs
K. E. Karunatilake	22 November 2010		Agriculture Secretary	
B. Wijayaratne	19 January 2015		Irrigation and Agriculture Secretary	
B. Wijayaratne	8 September 2015		Agriculture Secretary	
