= Ministry of Power and Energy =

Government ministry of Sri Lanka

- විදුලිබල හා බලශක්ති අමාත්‍යාංශය மின்சக்தி மற்றும் வலுசக்தி அமைச்சு

Ministry overview
- Jurisdiction: Government of Sri Lanka
- Headquarters: 437, Galle Road, Colombo 3; 6°54′4.90″N 79°51′17.60″E
- Annual budget: Rs 0.5 billion (2016, recurrent); Rs 0.8 billion (2016, capital)
- Minister responsible: Vacant, Minister of Power & Energy
- Ministry executive: Vacant, Ministry Secretary
- Child agencies: Ceylon Electricity Board (CEB); Lanka Coal Company (Pvt.) Ltd.; Lanka Electricity Company (LECO); LTL Holdings (Pvt.) Ltd.; Sri Lanka Atomic Energy Board; Sri Lanka Atomic Energy Regulatory Council; Sri Lanka Sustainable Energy Authority
- Website: energymin.gov.lk

The Ministry of Power and Energy (Sinhala: විදුලිබල හා බලශක්ති අමාත්‍යාංශය; Tamil: மின்சக்தி மற்றும் வலுசக்தி அமைச்சு) is a cabinet ministry of the Government of Sri Lanka responsible for power and renewable energy. The ministry is responsible for formulating and implementing national policy on power and renewable energy and other subjects which come under its purview.

As of April 2026, the offices of Minister of Power and Energy and Secretary to the Ministry are vacant. (Eng.) Kumara Jayakody and Prof. K. T. M. Udayanga Hemapala resigned on 17 April following controversy regarding coal procurement tenders, and the ministry has been placed under interim presidential oversight pending new appointments.

== Ministers ==
Ministers of Power & Energy
Name	Portrait	Party	Took office	Left office	Head of government	Ministerial title	Refs
Maithripala Senanayake		Sri Lanka Freedom Party	1947	8 December 1959	W. Dahanayake	Minister of Transport and Power	
Montague Jayawickrama		United National Party	23 March 1960	1960	Dudley Senanayake	Minister of Posts, Works and Power	
C. P. de Silva		Sri Lanka Freedom Party	23 July 1960		Sirimavo Bandaranaike	Minister of Agriculture, Land, Irrigation and Power	
C. P. de Silva		Sri Lanka Freedom Socialist Party	March 1965		Dudley Senanayake	Minister of Land, Irrigation and Power	
Maithripala Senanayake		Sri Lanka Freedom Party	31 May 1970		Sirimavo Bandaranaike	Minister of Irrigation, Power and Highways	
Gamini Dissanayake		United National Party	23 July 1977		J. R. Jayewardene	Minister of Irrigation, Power and Highways	
D. B. Wijetunga		United National Party			J. R. Jayewardene	Minister of Power and Energy	
Festus Perera		United National Party	18 February 1989	28 March 1990	Ranasinghe Premadasa	Minister of Power and Energy	
K. D. M. C. Bandara		United National Party	30 March 1990		Ranasinghe Premadasa	Minister of Power and Energy	
Anuruddha Ratwatte		Sri Lanka Freedom Party	19 August 1994		Dingiri Banda Wijetunga	Minister of Irrigation, Power and Energy	
Anuruddha Ratwatte		Sri Lanka Freedom Party	19 October 2000		Chandrika Kumaratunga	Minister of Power and Energy	
Anuruddha Ratwatte		Sri Lanka Freedom Party	14 September 2001		Chandrika Kumaratunga	Minister of Lands, Irrigation and Power	
Karu Jayasuriya		United National Party	12 December 2001		Chandrika Kumaratunga	Minister of Power and Energy	
Susil Premajayanth		Sri Lanka Freedom Party	10 April 2004		Chandrika Kumaratunga	Minister of Power and Energy	
John Seneviratne		Sri Lanka Freedom Party	23 November 2005		Mahinda Rajapaksa	Minister of Power and Energy	|
Champika Ranawaka		Jathika Hela Urumaya	23 April 2010		Mahinda Rajapaksa	Minister of Power and Energy	
Pavithra Devi Wanniarachchi		Sri Lanka Freedom Party	28 January 2013		Mahinda Rajapaksa	Minister of Power and Energy	
Champika Ranawaka		Jathika Hela Urumaya	12 January 2015	17 August 2015	Maithripala Sirisena	Minister of Power and Energy	
Ranjith Siyambalapitiya		Sri Lanka Freedom Party	4 September 2015		Maithripala Sirisena	Minister of Power and Renewable Energy	
Ravi Karunanayake		United National Party	20 December 2018		Maithripala Sirisena	Minister of Power, Energy Business Development	
Mahinda Amaraweera		Sri Lanka Podujana Peramuna	22 November 2019		Gotabaya Rajapaksa	Minister of Power and Energy	
Dullas Alahapperuma		Sri Lanka Podujana Peramuna	12 August 2020		Gotabaya Rajapaksa	Minister of Power	
Gamini Lokuge		Sri Lanka Podujana Peramuna	16 August 2021		Gotabaya Rajapaksa	Minister of Power	
Pavithra Devi Wanniarachchi		Sri Lanka Podujana Peramuna	3 March 2022		Gotabaya Rajapaksa	Minister of Power	
Kanchana Wijesekera		Sri Lanka Podujana Peramuna	14 May 2022		Gotabaya Rajapaksa	Minister of Power & Energy	
Kanchana Wijesekera		Sri Lanka Podujana Peramuna	22 July 2022	23 September 2024	Ranil Wickremesinghe	Minister of Power & Energy	
Anura Kumara Dissanayake		National People's Power	24 September 2024	17 November 2024	Anura Kumara Dissanayake	Ministry of Power and Energy	
Kumara Jayakody		National People's Power	18 November 2024	17 April 2026	Anura Kumara Dissanayake	Ministry of Energy	

== Secretaries ==
Power Secretaries
Name	Took office	Left office	Title	Refs
M. M. C. Ferdinando	25 April 2010		Secretary to the Ministry of Power and Energy	
(Dr.) B. M. S. Batagoda	19 January 2015		Secretary to the Ministry of Power and Energy	
(Dr.) B. M. S. Batagoda	8 September 2015		Secretary to the Ministry of Power and Renewable Energy	
(Ms.) Wasantha Perera	28 November 2019		Secretary to the Ministry of Power and Energy	
(Ms.) Wasantha Perera	14 August 2020		Secretary to the Ministry of Power	
K D S Ruwanchandra	26 April 2022		Secretary to the Ministry of Power	
M P D U K Mapa Pathirana	22 July 2022		Secretary to the Ministry of Power and Energy	
K T M Udayanga Hemapala	25 September 2025	17 April 2026	Secretary to the Ministry of Power and Energy	

== See also ==
- Electricity sector in Sri Lanka
- India–Sri Lanka HVDC Interconnection
- List of power stations in Sri Lanka
