= Vijitha Herath =

Sri Lankan politician and diplomat

Hon. Vijitha Herath MP
- විජිත හේරත් விஜித ஹேரத்
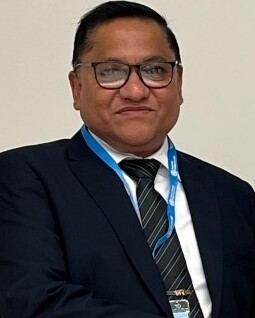
- Herath in 2025

Minister of Foreign Affairs
- Incumbent
- Assumed office 24 September 2024
- President: Anura Kumara Dissanayake
- Prime Minister: Harini Amarasuriya
- Preceded by: Ali Sabry
Former cabinet positions
Minister of Environment, Wildlife, Forest Resources, Water Supply, Plantation and Community, and Infrastructure
In office 24 September 2024 – 18 November 2024
President	Anura Kumara Dissanayake
Prime Minister	Harini Amarasuriya
Preceded by	Ramesh Pathirana
Succeeded by	Dammika Patabendi
Minister of Buddha Sasana, Religious and Cultural Affairs, National Integration, Social Security and Mass Media
In office 24 September 2024 – 18 November 2024
President	Anura Kumara Dissanayake
Prime Minister	Harini Amarasuriya
Preceded by	Vidura Wickremanayake
Succeeded by	Hiniduma Sunil Senevi
Minister of Public Security
In office 24 September 2024 – 18 November 2024
President	Anura Kumara Dissanayake
Prime Minister	Harini Amarasuriya
Preceded by	Tiran Alles
Succeeded by	Ananda Wijepala
Minister of Rural and Urban Development, and Housing and Construction
In office 24 September 2024 – 18 November 2024
President	Anura Kumara Dissanayake
Prime Minister	Harini Amarasuriya
Preceded by	Prasanna Ranatunga
Succeeded by	Anura Karunathilake
Minister of Transport, Highways, Ports and Civil Aviation
In office 24 September 2024 – 18 November 2024
President	Anura Kumara Dissanayake
Prime Minister	Harini Amarasuriya
Preceded by	Bandula Gunawardane
Succeeded by	Bimal Rathnayake
Minister of Cultural Affairs and National Heritage
In office 10 April 2004 – 24 June 2005
President	Chandrika Kumaratunga
Prime Minister	Mahinda Rajapaksa
Preceded by	Chandrika Kumaratunga
Succeeded by	Mahinda Yapa Abeywardena

Member of Parliament for Gampaha District
- Incumbent
- Assumed office 18 October 2000
- Majority: 716,715 Preferential votes

Personal details
- Born: Herath Mudiyanselage Vijitha Herath; 1 May 1968 (age 58)
- Party: Janatha Vimukthi Peramuna
- Other political affiliations: National People's Power
- Education: University of Kelaniya (BSc)
- Website: www.npp.lk/en/about

Herath Mudiyanselage Vijitha Herath (born 1 May 1968) is a Sri Lankan politician who has served as the Minister of Foreign Affairs since September 2024. Herath has been a Member of Parliament (MP) for Gampaha District since 2000.

== Early life and education ==
Herath Mudiyanselage Vijitha Herath earned a Bachelor of Science degree from the University of Kelaniya.

== Career ==
=== First Cabinet Positions ===
Vijitha Herath has held various cabinet positions throughout his political career. He briefly served from September to November in the First Dissanayake Cabinet as the Minister of Buddha Sasana, Religious and Cultural Affairs, National Integration, Social Security, and Mass Media; Minister of Environment, Wildlife, Forest Resources, Water Supply, Plantation and Community, and Infrastructure; Minister of Public Security; Minister of Rural and Urban Development, and Housing and Construction; and Minister of Transport, Highways, Ports, and Civil Aviation. Additionally, he served as the Minister of Cultural Affairs & National Heritage from 2004 to 2005, focusing on preserving Sri Lanka’s rich cultural heritage.

=== Foreign Minister ===
In November 2024, Herath was appointed as the Minister of Foreign Affairs, where he oversees Sri Lanka's diplomatic engagements and addresses emerging international challenges. His portfolio includes strengthening diplomatic ties with regional and global partners, advocating for cultural preservation through modern diplomacy, and tackling social security and environmental sustainability on national and international levels.

== Parliamentary Position ==
In 2024 Sri Lankan parliamentary election, Vijitha Herath set a record by receiving 716,715 votes in Gampaha, the highest ever obtained by a candidate in Sri Lanka's parliamentary electoral history.

=== Electoral history ===
Electoral history of Vijitha Herath
Election	Constituency	Party	Alliance	Votes	Result
1999 provincial	Gampaha District	JVP		605	Not Elected
2000 parliamentary	Gampaha District	JVP		8,823	Elected
2001 parliamentary	Gampaha District	JVP		13,981	Elected
2004 parliamentary	Gampaha District	JVP	UPFA	215,540	Elected
2010 parliamentary	Gampaha District	JVP	DNA	50,967	Elected
2015 parliamentary	Gampaha District	JVP		55,299	Elected
2020 parliamentary	Gampaha District	JVP	NPP	37,008	Elected
2024 parliamentary	Gampaha District	JVP	NPP	716,715	Elected
