= Harini Amarasuriya =

Prime Minister of Sri Lanka since 2024

Hon. Harini Amarasuriya MP
- හරිනි අමරසූරිය ஹரிணி அமரசூரிய
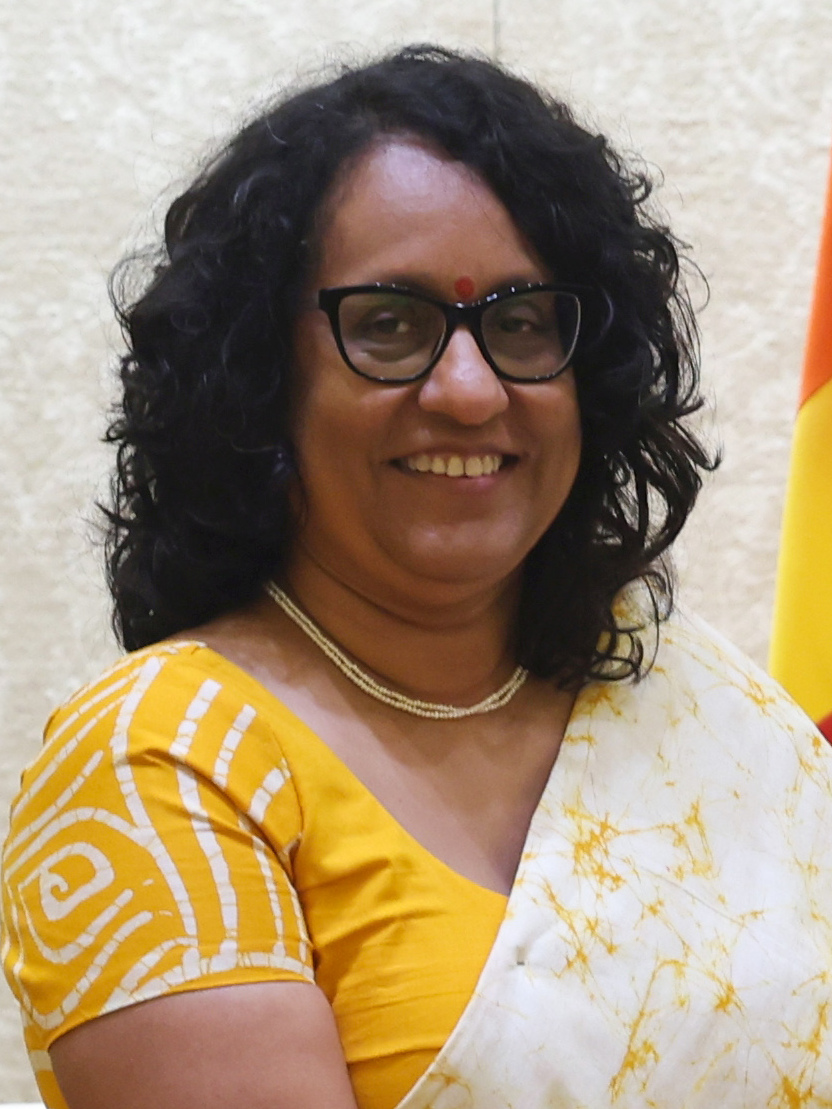
- Amarasuriya in 2025

Prime Minister of Sri Lanka
- Incumbent
- Assumed office 24 September 2024
- President: Anura Kumara Dissanayake
- Preceded by: Dinesh Gunawardena
Cabinet positions
Minister of Education, Higher Education and Vocational Education
Incumbent
Assumed office 18 November 2024
President	Anura Kumara Dissanayake
Prime Minister	Herself
Preceded by	Herself (Note: Minister of Education, Science and Technology)
In office 24 September 2024 – 18 November 2024
President	Anura Kumara Dissanayake
Prime Minister	Herself
Preceded by	Susil Premajayantha
Succeeded by	Herself (Note: as Minister of Education, Higher Education and Vocational Education) & Krishantha Abeysena (Note: as Minister of Science and Technology)
Minister of Trade, Commercial, Food Security, Co-operative Development, Industries and Entrepreneur Development
In office 24 September 2024 – 18 November 2024
President	Anura Kumara Dissanayake
Prime Minister	Herself
Preceded by	Ramesh Pathirana
Succeeded by	Wasantha Samarasinghe (Note: as Minister of Trade, Commerce, Food Security and Cooperative Development) & Sunil Handunnetti (Note: as Minister of Industries and Entrepreneurship Development)
Minister of Health
In office 24 September 2024 – 18 November 2024
President	Anura Kumara Dissanayake
Prime Minister	Herself
Preceded by	Ramesh Pathirana
Succeeded by	Nalinda Jayatissa
Minister of Women, Child and Youth Affairs and Sports
In office 24 September 2024 – 18 November 2024
President	Anura Kumara Dissanayake
Prime Minister	Herself
Preceded by	Ranil Wickramasinghe
Succeeded by	Saroja Savithri Paulraj (Note: as Minister of Women and Child Affairs) & Sunil Kumara Gamage (Note: as Minister of Sports and Youth Affairs)
Minister of Justice, Public Administration, Provincial Councils, Local Government and Labour
In office 24 September 2024 – 18 November 2024
President	Anura Kumara Dissanayake
Preceded by	Ali Sabry
Succeeded by	Harshana Nanayakkara (Note: as Minister of Justice and National Integration) & Chandana Abayarathna (Note: as Minister of Minister of State Administration, Provincial Councils and Local Government)

Member of Parliament for Colombo District
- Incumbent
- Assumed office 21 November 2024
- Majority: 655,289 Preferential votes

Member of Parliament for National List
- In office 20 August 2020 – 24 September 2024

Personal details
- Born: Harini Nireka Amarasuriya; 6 March 1970 (age 56) Galle, Dominion of Ceylon
- Party: National People's Power
- Education: Bishop's College, Colombo
- Alma mater: University of Delhi (BA); Macquarie University (MA); University of Edinburgh (PhD)
- Occupation: Academic, Politician
- Profession: Sociologist
- Website: www.npp.lk/en/about

Harini Nireka Amarasuriya (Note: Sinhala: හරිනි අමරසූරිය, romanized: Harini Amarasūriya Tamil: ஹரிணி அமரசூரிய, romanized: Hariṇi Amaracūriya.) (born 6 March 1970) is a Sri Lankan sociologist, academic, activist, and politician serving as the prime minister of Sri Lanka since 2024.

Having spent a decade as an academic at the Open University of Sri Lanka, where she was engaged with the Federation of University Teachers' Association in trade union action; Amarasuriya was nominated by the National People's Power (NPP) party as its National List Member of Parliament in 2020.

She was appointed the 16th prime minister of Sri Lanka in September 2024, concurrently appointed the interim minister of justice, health, women, education, trade, and industries in the first Dissanayake cabinet. She is the third woman to hold the office of prime minister of Sri Lanka, after Sirimavo Bandaranaike and her daughter Chandrika Kumaratunga. Amarasuriya was reappointed prime minister following the NPP's victory in the 2024 Sri Lankan parliamentary election, in which she received 655,289 votes—the second-highest ever obtained by a candidate in Sri Lanka's parliamentary electoral history.

== Early life and education ==
Born in Galle on 6 March 1970, her father was a planter and her mother a housewife, Amarasuriya was the youngest of three. The family moved to Colombo after her father's estate was taken over by the government under the Land Reform Act of 1972, where she attended Bishop's College, with a year in the United States as an exchange student.

Amarasuriya gained an Indian government scholarship to read Sociology at the Hindu College, from 1991 to 1994, graduating with a Bachelor of Arts honours degree in sociology from the University of Delhi. Her contemporaries at Hindu College included Imtiaz Ali and Arnab Goswami. Following her return from India, she worked as a community health worker with Nest Sri Lanka, working with tsunami-affected children. Five years later she gained a Master of Arts in Applied and Development Anthropology from Macquarie University, followed by a PhD in Social Anthropology from the University of Edinburgh.

== Academic and activist ==
She joined the Open University of Sri Lanka as a senior lecturer in the Department of Social Sciences in 2011 after completing her PhD, where she later became the head of the department. Amarasuriya has undertaken research into Human Rights and Ethics in Sri Lanka, funded by the European Research Council, and research into the influence of radical Christians on dissent in Sri Lanka, funded by the Institute for Advanced Studies in the Humanities, The University of Edinburgh.

=== Trade union action ===
Becoming a member of the Federation of University Teachers' Association (FUTA), she took part in trade union action demanding better working conditions and fair treatment for university staff.

=== 6% of GDP for education ===
Amarasuriya has been an advocate for educational reforms to truly enable free education as envisioned by C. W. W. Kannangara when free education was introduced in Sri Lanka in 1938. She has called for the equal access to quality education independent of the economic power of the people thus ensuring equal education opportunities for everyone, by which to stop the concept of popular schools in Sri Lanka. On this note, Amarasuriya campaigned with the FUTA in 2011 and 2012 for government allocation of 6% of the GDP for education. In 2023, Sri Lanka had only allocated 2% of its GDP for education.

== Political career ==
=== Member of Parliament ===
Amarasuriya joined the National Intellectuals Organization in 2019 and campaigned for the NPP Candidate Anura Kumara Dissanayake during the 2019 Sri Lankan presidential election. On 12 August 2020, she was nominated and appointed by the NPP as the national list candidate to enter the 16th Parliament of Sri Lanka following the 2020 Sri Lankan parliamentary election.

Confusion and concerns were raised about whether she could continue her service as an academic senior lecturer at the Open University after being nominated as a national list candidate. However, in an interview with EconomyNext, she officially revealed that she had resigned from the position of senior lecturer of the Open University in order to pursue her political career and parliamentary politics as an MP.

She focused on reconciliation and social inclusion to help bridge ethnic, religious and political divides in Sri Lanka, as well as promoting national unity and stability. Additionally, she advocated for gender equality and LGBTQ+ rights, was involved in the Parliamentary Caucus for Animal Welfare, and served on the board of directors for the non-governmental organisation Nest.

=== Premiership (2024–present) ===
"Well, we don't have experience in making the country bankrupt for sure, but we will get experience in building the country,"

— Harini Amarasuriya,

On 24 September 2024, Amarasuriya was sworn in as the Sixteenth (16th) Prime Minister of Sri Lanka by President Anura Kumara Dissanayake. She is the first prime minister of her party, and the third woman to hold the role after Sirimavo Bandaranaike and Chandrika Kumaratunga.

Since the NPP had only two members left in parliament following Dissanayake's ascent to the presidency, his first cabinet consisted of only three members, including himself and Amarasuriya. Amarasuriya was given the portfolios of Justice, Public Administration, Provincial Councils, Local Government and Labour, Education, Science and Technology, Trade, Commercial, Food Security, Co-operative Development, Industries and Entrepreneur Development, Women, Child and Youth Affairs and Sports and Health in the caretaker government until a new parliament is elected in the parliamentary election on 14 November 2024.

==== Educational reforms ====
Following her appointment as Minister of Education, Amarasuriya initiated educational reforms with the halting of the longstanding practice of inviting politicians to school functions by school administrators, to remove the political influence from schools.

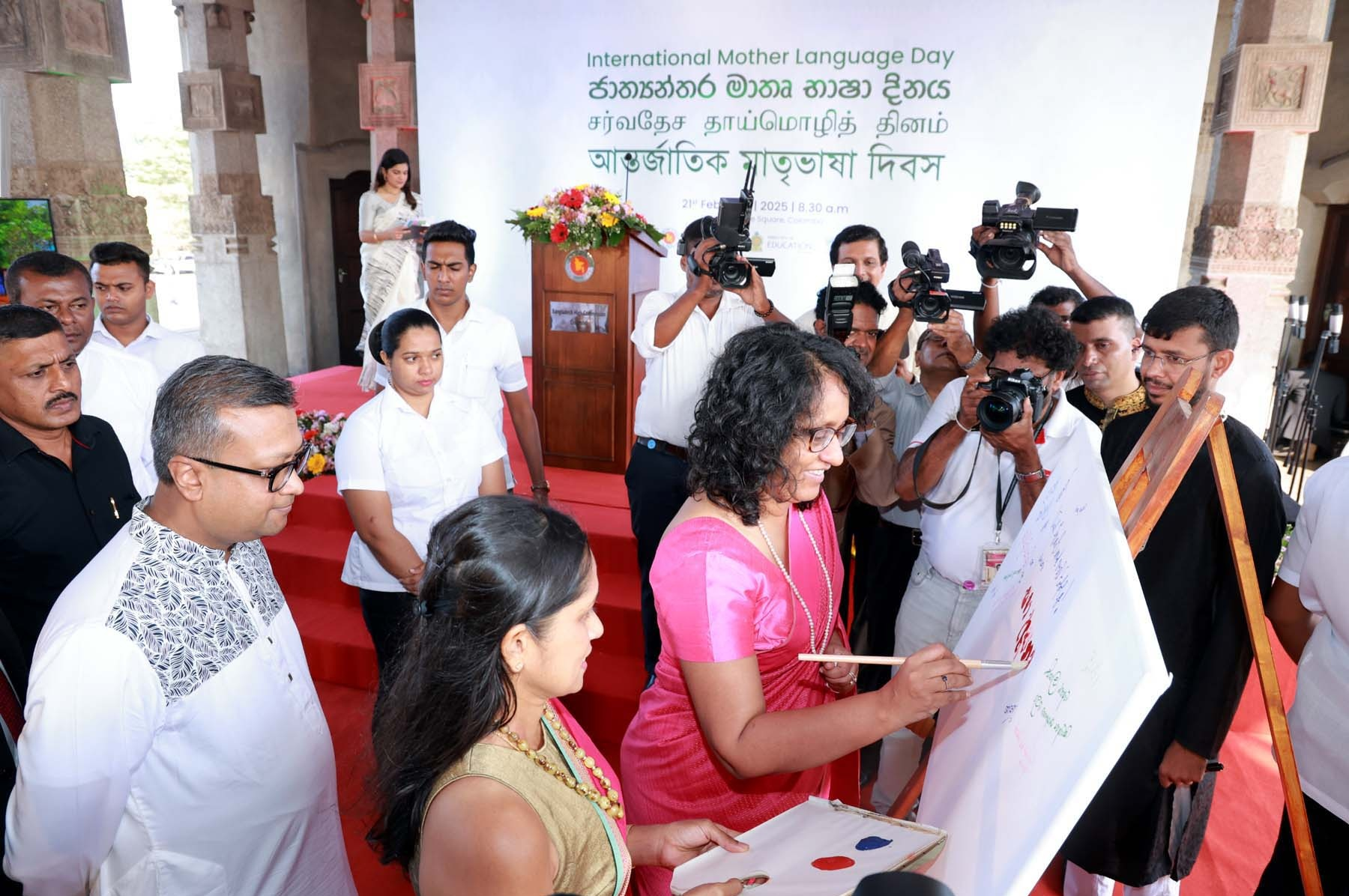
Harini Paints On Canvas at the international language day event

She enacted laws against physical and psychological punishment of children, including corporal punishment as well as psychological abuse and humiliation as a method of enforcing discipline in schools. She blamed the use of violence in schools for normalising violence in greater society, stating, "Domestic violence is rising, and conflicts in homes, institutions, and even religious spaces are being settled through aggression. That is extremely dangerous. As a society, we need to move beyond violence to resolve our problems."

==== 2024 parliamentary election ====
Amarasuriya who is the Deputy Secretary of the NPP led the NPP nominations from Colombo District for the 2024 Sri Lankan parliamentary election.

Amarasuriya set a new record by securing the highest preferential votes from Colombo District with 655,289 votes. She surpassed the preferential vote count of Mahinda Rajapaksa, who contested from Kurunegala District in 2020 and gained 527,364 votes, but in the same election Vijitha Herath set a new record with 716,715 votes in Gampaha District.

Following the parliamentary election, Amarasuriya was re-appointed the seventeenth (17th) Prime Minister of Sri Lanka. She was also appointed the Minister of Education, Higher Education and Vocational Education.

==== Grade Six English module controversy ====
In December 2025, several civil society organisations, politicians and education sector trade unions highlighted a number of irregularities in the newly formulated Grade 6 English module, which was scheduled for implementation during the 2026 academic year as part of the National People's Power (NPP) government's education reforms. The most controversial issue was the inclusion of a URL linking to an adult gay chat website in the Grade 6 English textbook.

The school curriculum was developed and implemented by the National Institute of Education (NIE), which operates under the purview of the Minister of Education, Higher Education and Vocational Education. The Educational Publications Department and the Ministry of Education were also responsible authorities. Criticism over these lapses was directed at Amarasuriya in her capacities as prime minister and minister of education, with some sections calling for her resignation.

On 31 December 2025, the secretary to the Ministry of Education lodged a complaint with the Criminal Investigation Department (CID), requesting an immediate investigation. On 1 January 2026, it was reported that the director general of the National Institute of Education had temporarily stepped down pending an inquiry. On 19 January 2026, the deputy director general of languages, humanities and social sciences, along with two other officials, were placed on compulsory leave.

Initially, the National Institute of Education approved the removal of all controversial content from the textbook. Subsequently, the Ministry of Education postponed the implementation of the new curriculum until 2027.

==== Foreign policy ====
As prime minister, Amarasuriya made her first official visit to India in October 2025, where she met with the Indian prime minister Narendra Modi and the minister of external affairs S Jaishankar, discussing on strengthening bilateral cooperation and fisherman's issue. She also addressed the 2025 NDTV World Summit which was held under the leadership of prime minister Modi and attended by Rishi Sunak and Tony Abbott.

== Electoral history ==
Electoral history of Harini Amarasuriya
Election	Constituency	Party	Votes	Result	Ref
2024 parliamentary	Colombo District	National People's Power	655,289	Elected	

== Personal life ==
Amarasuriya is unmarried, and has no children.

== Honours ==
In October 2024, the Postal Department issued a personalised stamp of Prime Minister Amarasuriya. The incident caused some controversy.

== Works ==
- Amarasuriya, Harini; Kelly, Tobias; Maunaguru, Sidharthan; Oustinova-Stjepanovic, Galina; Spencer, Jonathan (1 September 2020). The Intimate Life of Dissent: Anthropological Perspectives. UCL Press. ISBN 978-1-78735-777-8.

== Notes ==
Political offices
Preceded by Dinesh Gunawardena	Prime Minister of Sri Lanka; 2024 September–2024 November	Succeeded by Herself
Preceded by Herself	Prime Minister of Sri Lanka; 2024 November–present	Incumbent
Order of precedence
Preceded by Anura Kumara Dissanayake as President	Order of precedence of Sri Lanka; Prime Minister; 2024–present	Succeeded by Jagath Wickramaratne as Speaker of Parliament
