= Anura Kumara Dissanayake =

President of Sri Lanka since 2024

His Excellency Anura Kumara Dissanayake
- අනුර කුමාර දිසානායක அநுர குமார திசாநாயக்க
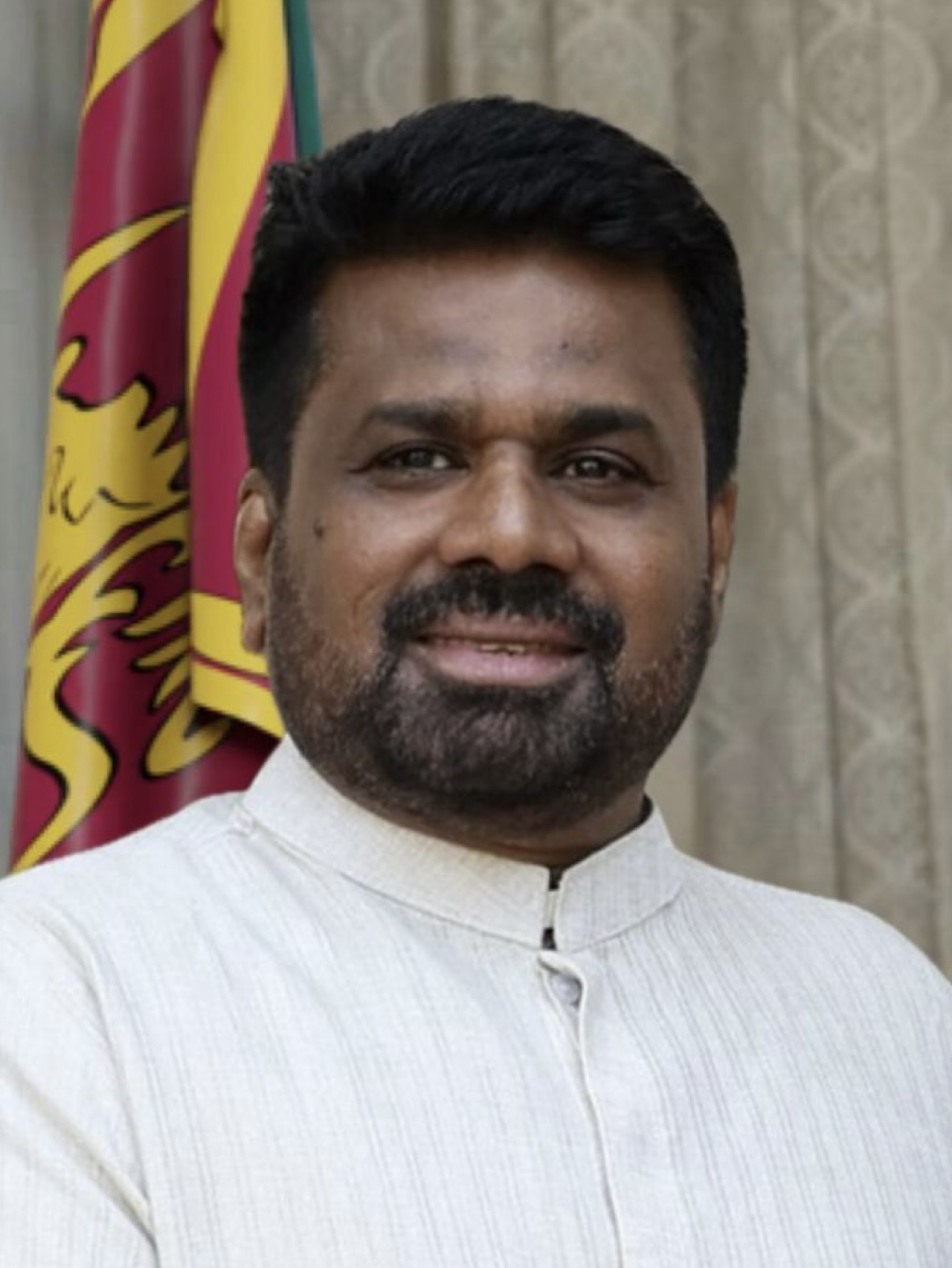
- Dissanayake in 2026

10th President of Sri Lanka
- Incumbent
- Assumed office 23 September 2024
- Prime Minister: Harini Amarasuriya
- Preceded by: Ranil Wickremesinghe
Cabinet positions
Minister of Defence
Incumbent
Assumed office 24 September 2024
President	Himself
Prime Minister	Harini Amarasuriya
Preceded by	Ranil Wickremesinghe
Minister of Finance
Incumbent
Assumed office 24 September 2024
President	Himself
Prime Minister	Harini Amarasuriya
Preceded by	Ranil Wickremesinghe
Minister of Agriculture, Land, Livestock, Irrigation, Fisheries and Aquatic Resources
In office 24 September 2024 – 18 November 2024
President	Himself
Prime Minister	Harini Amarasuriya
Preceded by	Mahinda Amaraweera
Succeeded by	K. D. Lalkantha
In office 10 April 2004 (Note: as Minister of Agriculture, Livestock, Land and Irrigation) – 24 June 2005
President	Chandrika Kumaratunga
Prime Minister	Mahinda Rajapaksa
Preceded by	S. B. Dissanayake
Succeeded by	Ratnasiri Wickremanayake
Minister of Energy
In office 24 September 2024 – 18 November 2024
President	Himself
Prime Minister	Harini Amarasuriya
Preceded by	Kanchana Wijesekera
Succeeded by	Kumara Jayakody
Parliamentary positions
Leader of the National People's Power
Incumbent
Assumed office 14 July 2019
Preceded by	Position established
Leader of Janatha Vimukthi Peramuna
Incumbent
Assumed office 29 September 2014
General Secretary	Tilvin Silva
Preceded by	Somawansa Amarasinghe
Chief Opposition Whip
In office 3 September 2015 – 18 December 2018
Preceded by	John Seneviratne
Succeeded by	Mahinda Amaraweera
Member of Parliament for Colombo district
In office 1 September 2015 – 23 September 2024
Succeeded by	Lakshman Nipuna Arachchi
Member of Parliament for Kurunegala district
In office 1 April 2004 – 8 April 2010
Member of Parliament for National List
In office 22 April 2010 – 17 August 2015
In office 18 October 2000 – 7 February 2004

Personal details
- Born: Dissanayaka Mudiyanselage Anura Kumara Dissanayake; 24 November 1968 (age 57) Dewahuwa, Ceylon
- Party: National People's Power
- Other political affiliations: Janatha Vimukthi Peramuna
- Spouse: Mallika Dissanayake
- Children: 1
- Education: Thambuttegama Central College; University of Kelaniya
- Occupation: Politician
- Profession: Student union leader
- Website: www.president.gov.lk

Anura Kumara Dissanayake (Note: Sinhala: අනුර කුමාර දිසානායක, romanized: Anura Kumāra Disānāyaka, pronounced [anurə kuma:rə disa:na:jəkə]; Tamil: அநுர குமார திசாநாயக்க, romanized: Anura Kumāra Ticānāyakka, Tamil pronunciation: [ɐnʊɾɐ kʊmaːɾɐ tɪtɕaːnaːjɐkːɐ].) (born 24 November 1968), commonly referred to by his initials AKD, is a Sri Lankan politician who has served as the president of Sri Lanka since 2024. Dissanayake is the first Sri Lankan president to be elected in a second round of vote counting, and the first not to be a member of the traditional political parties of Sri Lanka. He is also the ninth executive president of Sri Lanka, a constitutional distinction that separates the executive presidency established in 1978 from the earlier non-executive presidency.

Born on 24 November 1968 in the village of Galewela in the Central Province of Sri Lanka, Dissanayake moved with his family to the village of Thambuththegama in the North Central Province in 1972. While he was a student at the University of Peradeniya, he joined the Socialist Students Union, the student wing of the Janatha Vimukthi Peramuna (JVP) as a student when the Indo-Sri Lanka Accord was signed in 1987 and engaged in clandestine revolutionary activity until he was forced to go underground due to threats posed by the counterinsurgency operations undertaken by the government. A year later, he transferred to the University of Kelaniya. After he was awarded his bachelor's degree in science at the University of Kelaniya in 1995, he was elected the national organiser of the Socialist Students Union in 1997.

Dissanayake was selected to the Central Committee of the JVP in 1997. He was then appointed to the JVP Political Bureau in 1998 and entered parliament from the national list in 2000. He was elected to parliament in 2004 from the Kurunegala District with the highest number of preferential votes and served as Minister of Agriculture, Livestock, Land and Irrigation from 2004 to 2005. In 2008, he was appointed the leader of the JVP in parliament. He entered again Parliament through the national list in 2010. In 2014, he became the leader of the JVP and was elected to Parliament from the Colombo District in 2015. He served as Chief Opposition Whip from 2015 to 2018 and was selected as the most active Member of Parliament continuously for five years in a row. In 2019, he became the founding leader of the National People's Power (NPP).

Dissanayake ran for president in the 2019 presidential election and came in third place with 3.16% of the vote. He ran again in 2024 and was elected as President of Sri Lanka on 22 September 2024, becoming the first president to be elected from a third party.

== Early life, education and student politics ==
Dissanayake Mudiyanselage Anura Kumara Dissanayake was born on 24 November 1968 in the village of Dewahuwa, Matale District, Central Province, Sri Lanka. His father who was an agricultural worker who later joined the surveyor's department as an office aide and his mother was a housewife. He has one sister. An avid reader, his favorites include works by Leo Tolstoy and Maxim Gorky. He has claimed to be inspired by personalities such as Marx, Engels, Lenin, Gandhi, Tito and Castro.

His family moved to the Anuradhapura District in the North Central Province and settled in Thambuththegama. Dissanayake received his education at Thambuththegama Gamini Maha Vidyalaya and then Thambuththegama Central College, and became the first student from the college to gain university entrance to the University of Peradeniya.

=== Marxist revolutionary ===
Since his school days, Dissanayake had been involved with the JVP, which had been banned in 1983. Following the signing of the Indo-Sri Lanka Accord, the JVP launched its second insurrection against the Sri Lankan Government, and in 1987 a 19-year-old Dissanayake formally joined the JVP with his first cousin Sunil Dissanayake (Sunil Aiya), who convinced him to join while waiting for his GCE (AL) examination results. After gaining admission to the University of Peradeniya, Dissanayake moved to Kandy and spent most of his time engaged in the clandestine political activity of the JVP. Adopting the nom de guerre Aravinda, he undertook revolutionary work for the JVP and its military wing, the Deshapremi Janatha Vyaparaya (DJV). Dissanayake served as a courier between the various JVP cells. As the government stepped up counterinsurgency measures to suppress the JVP and the DJV, Dissanayake's cousin Sunil Dissanayake was arrested, tortured, and killed. Dissanayake fled from Peradeniya and went into hiding, as he soon became a wanted man. The newly built modest brick house of his relatively apolitical family was burnt down as a warning to Dissanayake. He dropped out of university and managed to survive by going underground. Much of the JVP leadership was hunted down and killed, except for Somawansa Amarasinghe who fled into exile in Europe with Indian assistance.

=== University of Kelaniya ===
After the counterinsurgency against the JVP subsided and the situation became safe, Dissanayake came out of hiding and transferred to the University of Kelaniya in 1992, where he completed his studies and graduated in 1995 with a Bachelor of Science degree.

== Political career ==
=== Socialist Students Union ===
Following the JVP's support for Chandrika Kumaratunga via its proxy the Sri Lanka Progressive Front in the 1994 Sri Lankan parliamentary election, Kumaratunga's government lifted the ban on the JVP and the party re-entered mainstream politics under Somawansa Amarasinghe. Many members of the party soon became vocal critics of the Kumaratunga government. Dissanayake, who has served as a secure courier for Amarasinghe, soon came under his wing. After graduating from university in 1995, Dissanayake was appointed the National Organiser of the JVP-backed Socialist Students Union, and soon took control of the Inter University Students' Federation.

=== JVP politburo ===
He was then appointed to the Central Working Committee of the JVP in 1996 and politburo of the JVP in 1998. Dissanayake worked as a student union organiser, expanding pro-JVP students' unions and establishing itself in most Sri Lankan universities and institutions of higher studies.

=== Legislative career (2000–2024) ===
Dissanayake entered parliament following the 2000 Sri Lankan parliamentary election from the national list of the JVP and was reappointed following the 2001 Sri Lankan parliamentary election.

==== Cabinet minister ====
In 2004, the JVP allied with the Sri Lanka Freedom Party (SLFP), contesting as a part of the United People's Freedom Alliance (UPFA) in the 2004 parliamentary elections and won 39 seats in parliament. Dissanayake was elected to parliament from the Kurunegala District from the UPFA and was appointed by President Kumaratunga as Minister of Agriculture, Livestock, Land and Irrigation in the joint SLFP–JVP cabinet in February 2004. During his tenure, he took over the maintenance of the Kandy Lake to the Irrigation Department and restored it.

He resigned from his ministerial portfolio on 16 June 2005, along with the other JVP ministers, following JVP leader Amerasinghe's decision to withdraw from the UPFA due to their opposition to President Kumaranatunga's controversial joint tsunami relief co-ordination with the LTTE in the North and Eastern provinces, also known as the Post-Tsunami Operational Management Structure (P-TOMS).

=== JVP party leader ===
On 2 February 2014, during the 17th National Convention of the JVP, Dissanayake was named as the new leader of the JVP, succeeding Somawansa Amarasinghe. Following his election as the leader, he apologised for the killings by the JVP during the second insurrection.

Following the 2015 parliamentary election, he served as Chief Opposition Whip from September 2015 to December 2018.

=== 2019 presidential election ===
On 18 August 2019, the National People's Power, a political alliance led by the JVP, announced that Dissanayake would be its presidential candidate in the 2019 presidential elections. Dissanayake came in third place with 3% of the vote, receiving 418,553 votes.

=== 2024 presidential election ===
On 29 August 2023, the NPP announced that Dissanayake would run for president again in 2024. The first vote count concluded with Dissanayake winning a plurality of the vote with 42.31%, followed by SJB candidate Sajith Premadasa with 32.76%. Since no candidate won a majority, a second round of vote counting was held. Dissanayake was declared the winner after the second count, securing 55.89% of the vote.

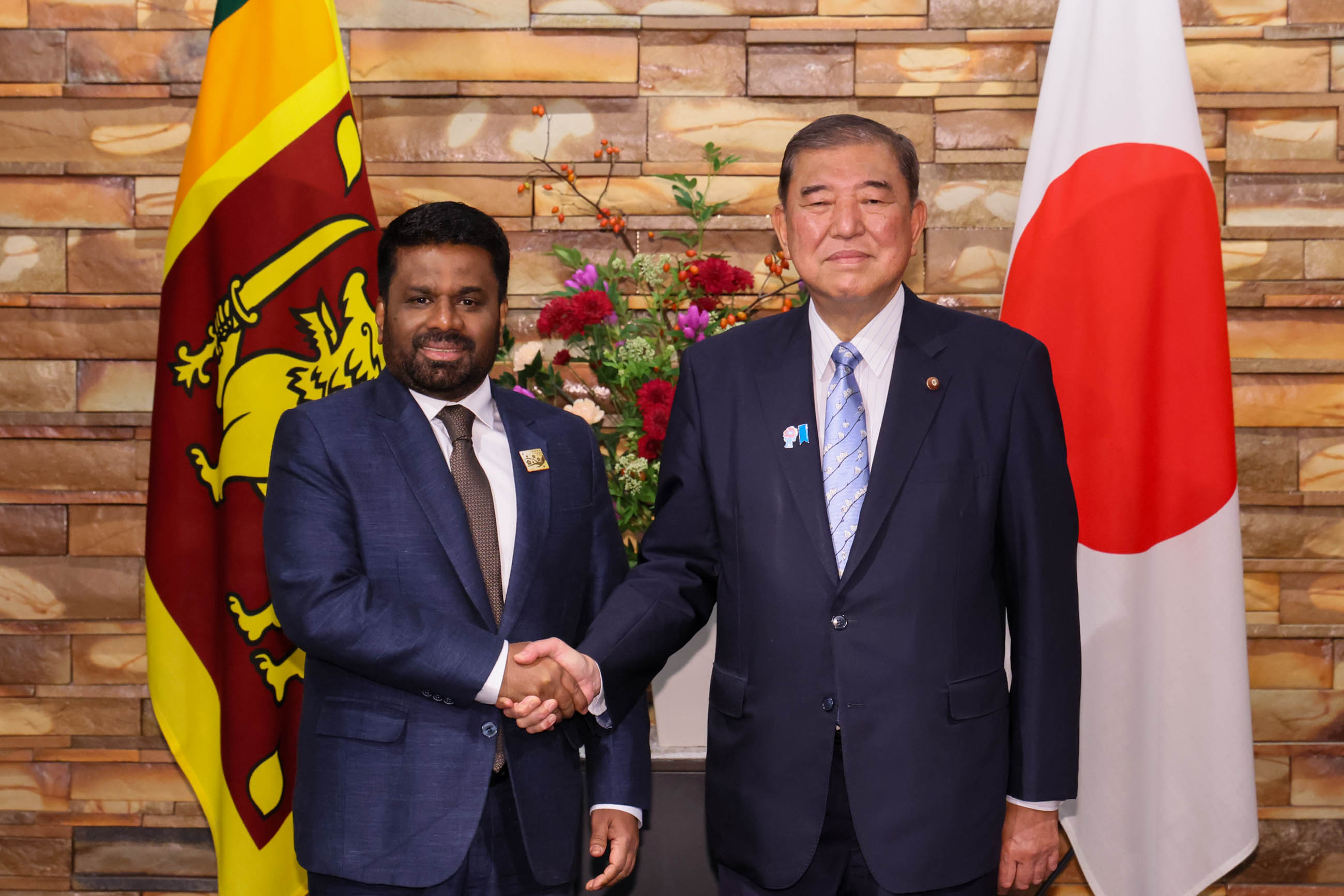
Anura with Japan prime minister Shigeru Ishiba during Japan-Sri Lanka Summit 2025

Dissanayake's victory was largely attributed to the dissatisfaction of the previous governments amidst the nation's ongoing economic crisis. As Dissanayake was the first president to be elected without winning a majority of the vote in the first count, he has been described as a "minority president" by some political commentators. Tamil National Alliance MP M. A. Sumanthiran congratulated Dissanayake on what he claimed as "a victory without relying on racial or religious chauvinism, a key factor that set his campaign apart."

== Presidency (2024–present) ==
=== Inauguration and cabinet ===
"I am not a magician, I am a common citizen,"

— Anura Kumara Dissanayake,

Dissanayake was inaugurated as president at the presidential secretariat on 23 September 2024. In his inaugural speech as president, he promised to fulfill the commitments listed in the mandate, reiterating that it would take time for the country to change. He also alluded to the proposal of parliamentary elections, so that a new government can be formed.

Dissanayake appointed members to his interim cabinet, which included Ananda Wijepala as the private secretary to his president, Nandika Sanath Kumanayake as secretary to the president, Ravi Seneviratne as secretary to the Ministry of Public Security, and Sampath Thuyacontha as the secretary to the Ministry of Defence.

Due to the seat of Dissanayake being vacant in parliament, Lakshman Nipuna Arachchi was appointed as the former's replacement as MP for the Colombo district.

=== Parliamentary elections ===
On 24 September, Dissanayake appointed MP Harini Amarasuriya as prime minister, the third woman to hold the position. He also appointed her as concurrent minister for justice, education and labour. Aside from Amarasuriya, Dissanayake also appointed Vijitha Herath, another NPP MP in Parliament to his cabinet. Later that day, he dissolved the 16th Parliament of Sri Lanka and called for early legislative elections scheduled on 14 November.

The Tamil National Alliance (TNA) has stated in late October 2024, that the TNA is willing to work with a Dissanayake government and accept ministerial portfolios.

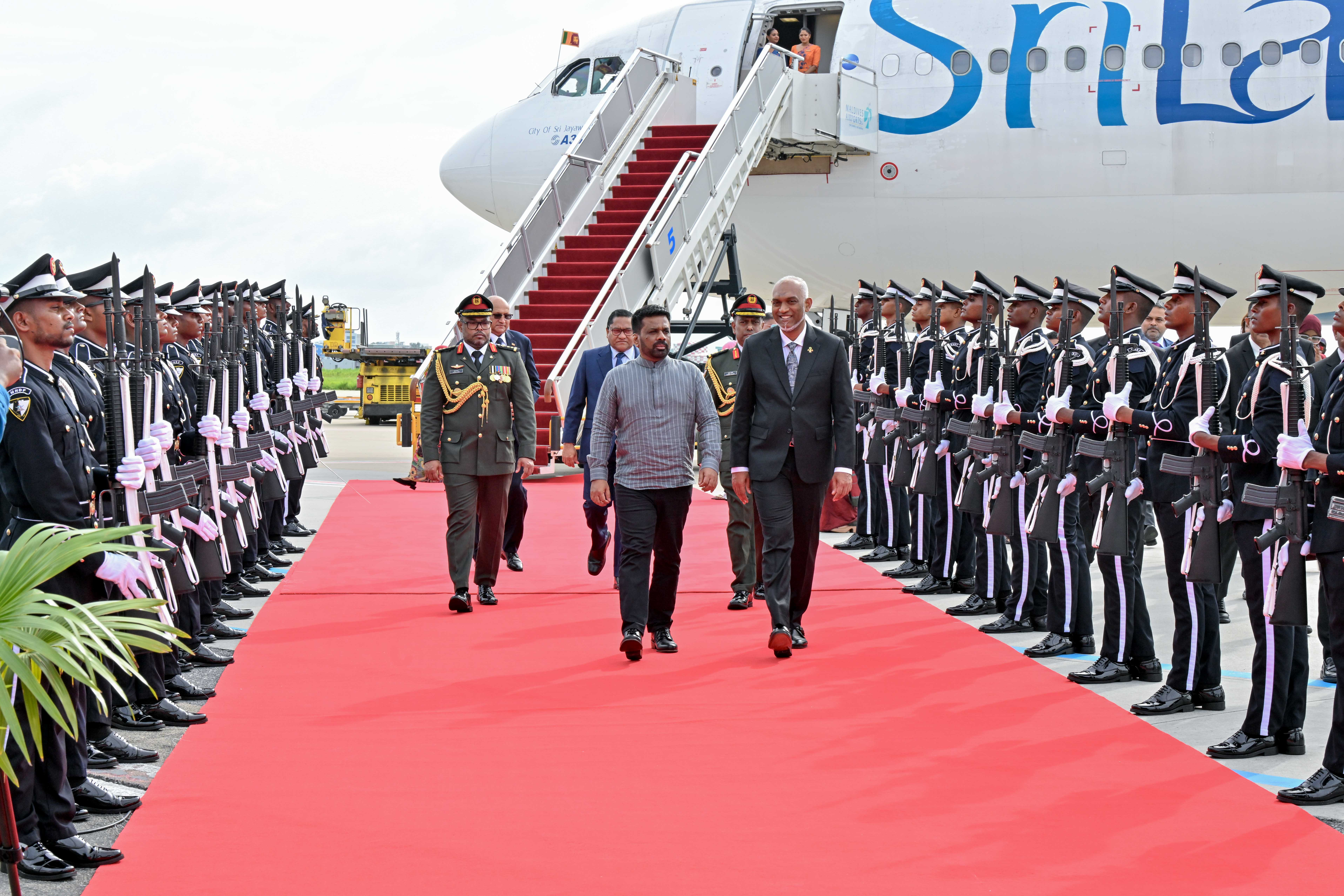
Anura arrives in Maldives during a state visit in 2025

Dissanayake led his party for a landslide victory in the elections by claiming 159 seats out of 225 that gave him over the 2/3 majority in parliament.

=== Economic policy ===
Dissanayake was highly critical of the Wickremesinghe government and the International Monetary Fund, claiming that the IMF only wished to bail out corrupt regimes. He stated that some of the IMF conditions need to be renegotiated, such as the reduction of certain taxes such as the pay-as-you-earn tax, as this has outperformed, while reducing expenditure to meet the primary surplus target. He has indicated that his government would increase social welfare grants while eliminating value-added taxes on essential items such as food, health services, medical equipment, and educational services. His government would reduce the cost of living and increase taxes on the wealthy while supporting their businesses. Since assuming the presidency, Dissanayake has committed to continuing the country's deal with the IMF.

President Dissanayake instructed 4,500 ha (11,000 acres) of land belonging to the Kantale Sugar Company to be distributed to farmers for the cultivation of short-term crops.

His first budget followed strict fiscal discipline, balancing the IMF program with the party's ideology. With much of the budget being taken up for debt servicing, he increased commitment to education and health as well as Aswesuma welfare benefits within the limits of the IMF program. High financial discipline of the government resulted in a surplus in the current account of the budget in 2025, for the first time after 38 years.

Anura Kumara stated his economic policy would target the development of an export-oriented manufacturing economy. The administration removed the ban on using rice for non-food products to encourage the manufacturing of value added products. The export of raw minerals without any processing or value addition was restricted.

=== Anti-corruption and crime ===
Dissanayake has promised to reopen over 400 cases of corruption and fraud, including restarting investigation into the 2015 Central Bank of Sri Lanka bond scandal and the 2019 Sri Lanka Easter bombings. Former senior police officer Shani Abeysekara was appointed to head the newly created Police Assets Recovery Unit.

The Presidential Secretariat instructed all former ministers and state officials to hand in any official vehicles and firearms issued to them and requested former presidents Mahinda Rajapaksa and Ranil Wickremesinghe to return vehicles in excess of their entitlements. During his election campaign, Dissanayake pledged to revoke entitlements enjoyed by former presidents and has appointed a committee to look into it. The Parliament would eventually act on the pledge, and revoked the entitlements in September 2025.

To fight organised crime, Dissanayake ordered the Attorney General to remove fundamental rights petitions submitted to the Supreme Court against police officers, including officers of the elite Special Task Force.

The government's anti-corruption acts received mixed reactions, with praise for stopping corruption at minister and deputy minister level but no major effects on top bureaucratic, middle, and lower levels among public officials. As a result, Commission to Investigate Allegations of Bribery or Corruption (CIABOC) began raids of government institutions and officials with large amounts of unexplained cash.

=== Foreign policy ===
Dissanayake has indicated that Sri Lanka intends to gain BRICS membership, initiated by the previous government. Although invited to attend the BRICS summit in Kazan in October 2024, Dissanayake indicated that he would be unable to attend due to the elections in the country and will instead send a delegation to the summit.

Sri Lanka rejected the resolution by the United Nations Human Rights Council in October 2024 for an external evidence gathering mechanism, stating that Dissanayake aimed to "make domestic mechanisms credible and sound".

On 22 October 2024, cabinet spokesman Vijitha Herath announced that neither the president nor any other ministers would attend the 2024 Commonwealth Heads of Government Meeting (CHOGM), scheduled to be held in Apia, Samoa, from 25 to 26 October 2024. Instead, a delegation of officials from the Sri Lanka High Commission in the UK and the Foreign Ministry will represent Sri Lanka at the meeting.

Also on 22 October 2024, Foreign Secretary Aruni Wijewardane led the Sri Lanka delegation to the 2024 BRICS summit in Kazan, Russia. The country had initiated its formal application process to join BRICS.

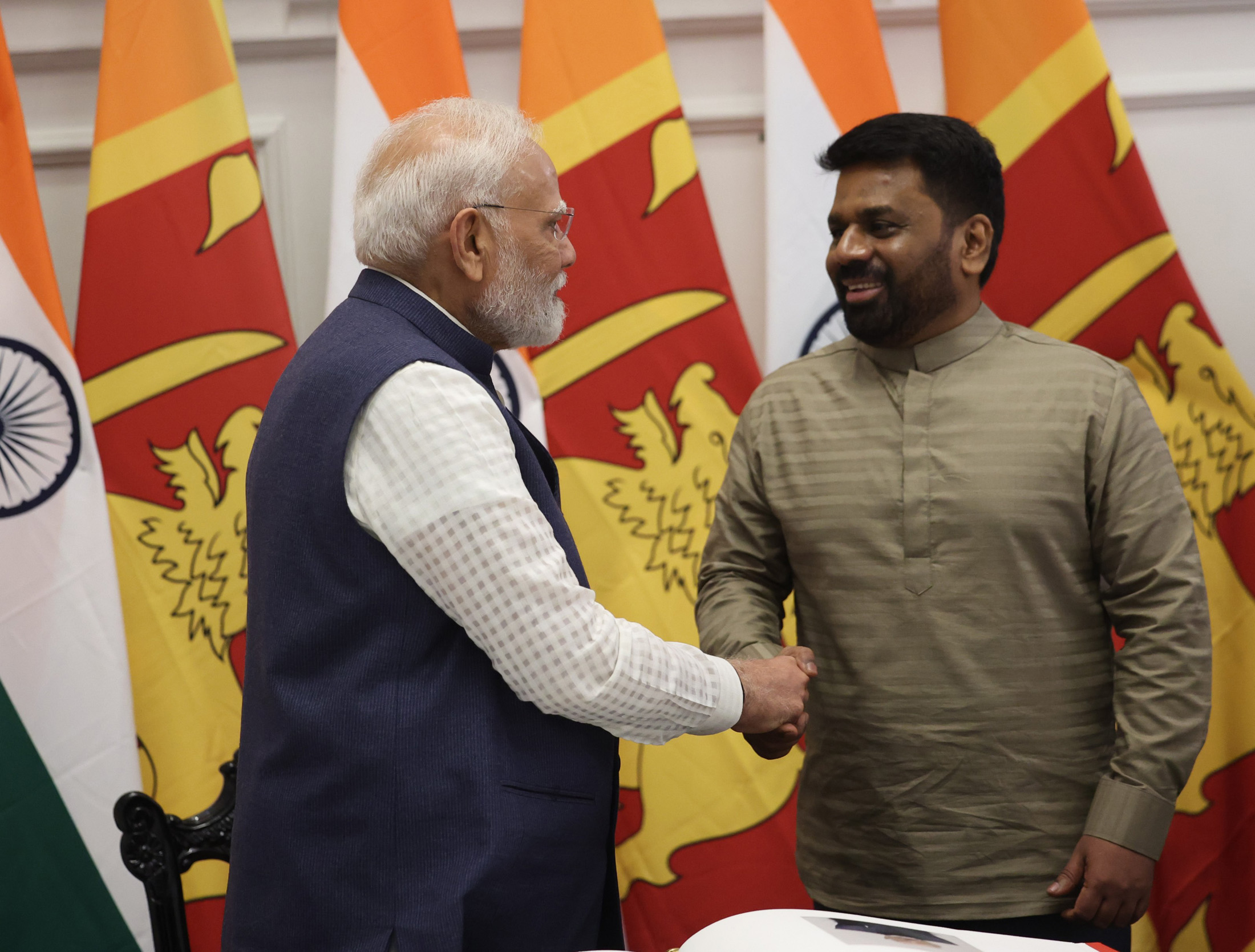
Anura Kumara Dissanayake with Indian Prime Minister Narendra Modi, in 2025

Dissanayake's first overseas visit was to India in December 2024, during which he met with Prime Minister Narendra Modi in New Delhi. In 2025 he pledged that Sri Lankan territory will not be allowed to be used for anti-Indian activities. He also signed an MoU to go ahead with the Indo-Lanka grid connection but refused the proposal for a land bridge connecting Sri Lanka to India.

During the 2026 Iran War, he sought to maintain Sri Lanka's neutrality while acting on humanitarian grounds. After the sinking of IRIS Dena, Sri Lanka acted to rescue survivors and recover bodies, while the crew of IRIS Bushehr was evacuated and the ship was interned under international conventions. Sri Lanka also refused US requests to land armed aircraft in Sri Lankan airports.

=== Truth and reconciliation ===
Dissanayake visited the Archbishop of Colombo, Cardinal Malcolm Ranjith, where he received blessings and later vowed to uncover the truth surrounding the 2019 Easter Sunday bombings.

Responding to calls by Northern Province residents, Dissanayake ordered the reopening of the Palali-Achchuveli main road in October 2024, which was carried out by the Defence Secretary. The road which ran across the high-security zone of the Palaly Cantonment in Jaffna had been closed for over 30 years since the start of the Sri Lankan Civil War. Former Ilankai Tamil Arasu Kachchi parliamentarian M. A. Sumanthiran urged President Dissanayake to release all remaining military-occupied land, both residential and agrarian. Dissanayake promised on 11 November that lands occupied by the government and military would be gradually returned to their previous owners. The program began with the closing of the Paruthithurai camp on 20 November. Several military checkpoints were also either closed or transferred to the police. In 2025, he proposed that more Tamil-speaking Sri Lankans should be recruited to the Sri Lanka Police. He was also critical of Sinhalese going on pilgrimages for a certain Temple in Jaffna referening to the Tissa Vihara.

=== National security ===
Dissanayake has responded to the threat of terrorism that appeared in October 2024 with travel advisories raised by the United States and several other countries, by deploying the police, intelligence officers and the armed forces in Colombo, Arugam Bay, Weligama and Ella; and meeting foreign envoys.

Dissanayake days after replacing the Commander of the Army, Vikum Liyanage, revealed in January 2025 that 73 Type 56 assault rifles of the army had fallen into hands of organised criminals, which has led to the arrest of several army officers and personnel.

Dissanayake continued the reduction in size of the military begun by the previous governments while emphasizing the need to purchase modern equipment. According to him, by 2030, the Army will be resized to 100,000, Navy to 40,000 and Air Force to 18,000. He also noted that aircraft and ships of the military were outdated and will be replaced. He also pledged to replace the Prevention of Terrorism Act with a new act that allows security threats to be addressed without curtailing civil liberties.

=== Controversy ===
On 22 April 2026, Maithri Gunaratne, a former Governor of Central Province, claimed that the Finance, Planning and Economic Development Ministry, under Dissanayake, as the Cabinet minister, and Harshana Suriyapperuma as the secretary to the ministry, had made a wrongful payment of US$2.5 million to a third party instead of settling part of a US$22.9 million debt repayment to Australia. He also requested the Parliament of Sri Lanka investigate the matter through a letter addressed to the Speaker. Nalinda Jayatissa, the Cabinet spokesperson, stated that a clarification would be issued by the ministry in due course.

The ministry subsequently claimed that the funds had been diverted by a hacker following a breach of its systems and that the cyberattack and the resulting fraud were first identified in January 2026. Complaints were lodged with the Criminal Investigation Department (CID) and the Financial Intelligence Unit (FIU) of the Central Bank of Sri Lanka. The ministry also stated that five officials have been interdicted following an internal investigation and it would seek assistance from foreign partners to trace the funds and pursue further legal action.

== Political positions ==
Dissanayake has been characterised in media as a Marxist, a neo-Marxist, and a pragmatist. During his 2024 presidential campaign, Dissanayake pledged to dissolve the then-incumbent parliament within 45 days of coming to power and seek a general mandate for his policies. He ran on a platform of anti-corruption and anti-poverty in 2024. Dhananath Fernando, CEO of the Colombo-based pro-market think tank Advocata Institute, said that Dissanayake "now advocates for a pro-trade approach, emphasising the simplification of the tariff structure, improving the business environment, reforming tax administration, ending corruption and positioning the private sector as the engine of growth. However, his stance on debt negotiations remains unclear."

== Electoral history ==
Electoral history of Anura Kumara Dissanayaka
Election	Constituency	Party	Alliance	Votes	Result
2004 parliamentary	Kurunegala District	Janatha Vimukthi Peramuna	United People's Freedom Alliance	153,868	Elected
2015 parliamentary	Colombo District	Janatha Vimukthi Peramuna	—N/a	65,966	Elected
2019 presidential	Sri Lanka	Janatha Vimukthi Peramuna	National People's Power	418,553	Lost
2020 parliamentary	Colombo District	Janatha Vimukthi Peramuna	National People's Power	49,814	Elected
2022 presidential	Sri Lanka	Janatha Vimukthi Peramuna	National People's Power	3 (E.V)	Lost
2024 presidential	Sri Lanka	Janatha Vimukthi Peramuna	National People's Power	5,740,179	Elected

== Notes ==
Political offices
Preceded by Ranil Wickremesinghe	President of Sri Lanka; 2024–present	Incumbent
Preceded by Ranil Wickremesinghe	Minister of Defence; 2024-present	Incumbent
Preceded by Ranil Wickremesinghe	Minister of Finance; 2024-present	Incumbent
Preceded by S. B. Dissanayake	Minister of Agriculture, Land and Livestock; 2004–2005	Succeeded by Ratnasiri Wickremanayake
Parliament of Sri Lanka
Preceded by W. D. J. Senewiratne	Chief Opposition Whip; 3 September 2015 – 18 December 2018	Succeeded by Mahinda Amaraweera
Party political offices
Preceded by Somawansa Amarasinghe	Leader of Janatha Vimukthi Peramuna; 2014–present	Incumbent
New office	Leader of National People's Power; 2019–present	Incumbent
Order of precedence
First	Order of precedence of Sri Lanka; President; 2024–present	Succeeded by Harini Amarasuriya as Prime Minister
