= Udupiddy Polling Division =

Udupiddy
- Polling Division
- Coordinates: 9.778364°N 80.175134°E
- Country: Sri Lanka
- Province: Northern Province, Sri Lanka
- Electoral District: Jaffna Electoral District

Area
  - Total: 77.61 km^{2} (29.97 sq mi)

Population (2012)
  - Total: 45,730
  - Density: 589/km^{2} (1,530/sq mi)
- ISO 3166 code: EC-10F

The Udupiddy Polling Division is a Polling Division in the Jaffna Electoral District, in the Northern Province, Sri Lanka.

== Presidential Election Results ==
=== Summary ===
The winner of Udupiddy has matched the final country result 2 out of 8 times.

Year	Udupiddy	Jaffna Electoral District	MAE %	Sri Lanka	MAE %
2019	NDF	NDF	1.87%	SLPP	41.14%
2015	NDF	NDF	4.22%	NDF	28.56%
2010	NDF	NDF	3.58%	UPFA	33.35%
2005	UNP	UNP	9.73%	UPFA	32.55%
1999	UNP	PA	5.59%	PA	8.44%
1994	PA	PA	4.02%	PA	28.84%
1988	SLFP	SLFP	4.96%	UNP	18.26%
1982	SLFP	ACTC	8.34%	UNP	25.36%
Matches/Mean MAE	2/8	3/8	5.29%	8/8	27.06%

=== 2019 Sri Lankan Presidential Election ===
Party	Udupiddy		Jaffna Electoral District		Sri Lanka	
Party	Votes	%	Votes	%	Votes	%
NDF	19,307	81.74%	312,722	83.86%	5,564,239	41.99%
Other Parties (with < 1%)	1,509	6.39%	23,295	6.25%	717,212	5.41%
SLPP	1,334	5.65%	23,261	6.24%	6,924,255	52.25%
IND10	942	3.99%	6,845	1.84%	12,256	0.09%
DUNF	529	2.24%	6,790	1.82%	34,537	0.26%
Valid Votes	23,621	96.50%	372,913	97.07%	13,252,499	98.99%
Rejected Votes	857	3.50%	11,251	2.93%	135,452	1.01%
Total Polled	24,478	62.96%	384,164	68.00%	13,387,951	83.71%
Registered Electors	38,879		564,984		15,992,568	

=== 2015 Sri Lankan Presidential Election ===
Party	Udupiddy		Jaffna Electoral District		Sri Lanka	
Party	Votes	%	Votes	%	Votes	%
NDF	18,137	78.68%	253,574	74.42%	6,217,162	51.28%
UPFA	3,937	17.08%	74,454	21.85%	5,768,090	47.58%
Other Parties (with < 1%)	978	4.24%	12,723	3.73%	138,200	1.14%
Valid Votes	23,052	97.57%	340,751	97.14%	12,123,452	98.85%
Rejected Votes	574	2.43%	10,038	2.86%	140,925	1.15%
Total Polled	23,626	60.26%	350,789	64.22%	12,264,377	78.69%
Registered Electors	39,204		546,265		15,585,942	

=== 2010 Sri Lankan Presidential Election ===
Party	Udupiddy		Jaffna Electoral District		Sri Lanka	
Party	Votes	%	Votes	%	Votes	%
NDF	8,974	67.20%	113,877	63.84%	4,173,185	40.15%
UPFA	2,545	19.06%	44,154	24.75%	6,015,934	57.88%
Other Parties (with < 1%)	887	6.64%	10,438	5.85%	132,316	1.27%
Ind 5	334	2.50%	3,205	1.80%	9,662	0.09%
UDF	314	2.35%	3,325	1.86%	23,290	0.22%
DUNF	301	2.25%	3,370	1.89%	39,226	0.38%
Valid Votes	13,355	95.70%	178,369	96.35%	10,393,613	99.03%
Rejected Votes	600	4.30%	6,763	3.65%	101,838	0.97%
Total Polled	13,955	24.73%	185,132	25.15%	10,495,451	66.70%
Registered Electors	56,426		736,032		15,734,587	

=== 2005 Sri Lankan Presidential Election ===
Party	Udupiddy		Jaffna Electoral District		Sri Lanka	
Party	Votes	%	Votes	%	Votes	%
UNP	52	81.25%	5,523	70.20%	4,706,366	48.43%
UPFA	11	17.19%	1,967	25.00%	4,887,152	50.29%
ULPP	1	1.56%	120	1.53%	14,458	0.15%
Valid Votes	64	98.46%	7,868	92.30%	9,717,039	98.88%
Rejected Votes	1	1.54%	656	7.70%	109,869	1.12%
Total Polled	65	0.12%	8,524	1.20%	9,826,908	69.51%
Registered Electors	55,499		707,970		14,136,979	

=== 1999 Sri Lankan Presidential Election ===
Party	Udupiddy		Jaffna Electoral District		Sri Lanka	
Party	Votes	%	Votes	%	Votes	%
UNP	5,685	48.72%	48,005	43.03%	3,602,748	42.71%
PA	4,664	39.97%	52,043	46.65%	4,312,157	51.12%
Other Parties (with < 1%)	437	3.74%	4,057	3.64%	423,682	5.02%
LDA	417	3.57%	3,394	3.04%	23,668	0.28%
Ind 2	210	1.80%	1,873	1.68%	27,052	0.32%
Liberal	138	1.18%	1,368	1.23%	25,085	0.30%
Ind 1	118	1.01%	831	0.74%	21,119	0.25%
Valid Votes	11,669	94.06%	111,568	94.91%	8,435,754	97.69%
Rejected Votes	737	5.94%	5,981	5.09%	199,536	2.31%
Total Polled	12,406	23.17%	117,549	19.15%	8,635,290	72.17%
Registered Electors	53,545		613,718		11,965,536	

=== 1994 Sri Lankan Presidential Election ===
Party	Udupiddy		Jaffna Electoral District		Sri Lanka	
Party	Votes	%	Votes	%	Votes	%
PA	24	92.31%	16,934	96.35%	4,709,205	62.28%
UNP	2	7.69%	223	1.27%	2,715,283	35.91%
Valid Votes	26	100.00%	17,575	99.20%	7,561,526	98.03%

=== 1988 Sri Lankan Presidential Election ===
Party	Udupiddy		Jaffna Electoral District		Sri Lanka	
Party	Votes	%	Votes	%	Votes	%
SLFP	3,400	41.55%	44,197	36.82%	2,289,857	44.95%
SLMP	3,120	38.13%	42,198	35.15%	235,701	4.63%
UNP	1,662	20.31%	33,650	28.03%	2,569,199	50.43%
Valid Votes	8,182	96.43%	120,045	93.38%	5,094,754	98.24%
Rejected Votes	303	3.57%	8,517	6.62%	91,499	1.76%
Total Polled	8,485	16.29%	128,562	23.30%	5,186,256	55.87%
Registered Electors	52,084		551,713		9,283,143	

=== 1982 Sri Lankan Presidential Election ===
Party	Udupiddy		Jaffna Electoral District		Sri Lanka	
Party	Votes	%	Votes	%	Votes	%
SLFP	8,155	47.97%	77,210	35.42%	2,546,348	39.05%
ACTC	5,779	33.99%	87,263	40.03%	173,934	2.67%
UNP	2,282	13.42%	44,775	20.54%	3,450,815	52.93%
LSSP	353	2.08%	3,376	1.55%	58,531	0.90%
NSSP	224	1.32%	2,176	1.00%	16,995	0.26%
JVP	208	1.22%	3,098	1.42%	273,428	4.19%
Valid Votes	17,001	95.42%	218,003	95.36%	6,520,156	98.78%
Rejected Votes	816	4.58%	10,610	4.64%	80,470	1.22%
Total Polled	17,817	40.50%	228,613	45.86%	6,600,626	80.15%
Registered Electors	43,990		498,545		8,235,358	

== Parliamentary Election Results ==
=== Summary ===
The winner of Udupiddy has matched the final country result 0 out of 7 times.

Year	Udupiddy	Jaffna Electoral District	MAE %	Sri Lanka	MAE %
2015	ITAK	ITAK	3.01%	UNP	34.95%
2010	ITAK	ITAK	3.19%	UPFA	29.72%
2004	ITAK	ITAK	3.99%	UPFA	6.43%
2001	TULF	TULF	13.10%	UNP	21.76%
2000	TULF	EPDP	11.69%	PA	13.21%
1994	IND2	IND2	14.67%	PA	0.41%
1989	INDI	INDI	11.25%	UNP	27.63%
Matches/Mean MAE	0/7	0/7	8.70%	7/7	19.16%

=== 2015 Sri Lankan Parliamentary Election ===
Party	Udupiddy		Jaffna Electoral District		Sri Lanka	
Party	Votes	%	Votes	%	Votes	%
ITAK	12,650	67.38%	207,577	70.08%	515,963	4.63%
UPFA	2,192	11.68%	17,309	5.84%	4,732,664	42.48%
AITC	1,606	8.55%	15,022	5.07%	18,644	0.17%
EPDP	1,037	5.52%	30,232	10.21%	33,481	0.30%
UNP	925	4.93%	20,025	6.76%	5,098,916	45.77%
Other Parties (with < 1%)	363	1.93%	6,034	2.04%	580,476	5.21%
Valid Votes	18,773	88.81%	296,199	90.91%	11,140,333	95.35%
Rejected Votes	1,835	8.68%	25,496	7.83%	516,926	4.42%
Total Polled	21,138	53.92%	325,805	61.56%	11,684,111	77.66%
Registered Electors	39,204		529,239		15,044,490	

=== 2010 Sri Lankan Parliamentary Election ===
Party	Udupiddy		Jaffna Electoral District		Sri Lanka	
Party	Votes	%	Votes	%	Votes	%
ITAK	4,630	44.93%	65,119	44.03%	233,190	2.91%
UPFA	2,533	24.58%	47,622	32.20%	4,846,388	60.38%
AITC	760	7.38%	6,362	4.30%	7,544	0.09%
UNP	717	6.96%	12,624	8.54%	2,357,057	29.37%
Other Parties (with < 1%)	315	3.06%	6,190	4.19%	478,181	5.96%
LLF	314	3.05%	868	0.59%	2,385	0.03%
IG1J	270	2.62%	2,648	1.79%	2,648	0.03%
IG4J	257	2.49%	2,151	1.45%	2,151	0.03%
TULF	228	2.21%	2,892	1.96%	9,223	0.11%
IG3J	171	1.66%	1,161	0.79%	1,161	0.01%
IG7J	109	1.06%	261	0.18%	261	0.00%
Valid Votes	10,304	87.09%	147,898	87.89%	8,026,322	96.03%
Rejected Votes	1,485	12.55%	19,774	11.75%	581,465	6.96%
Total Polled	11,832	20.97%	168,277	22.68%	8,358,246	59.29%
Registered Electors	56,426		742,005		14,097,690	

=== 2004 Sri Lankan Parliamentary Election ===
Party	Udupiddy		Jaffna Electoral District		Sri Lanka	
Party	Votes	%	Votes	%	Votes	%
ITAK	24,172	94.77%	257,320	90.60%	633,203	6.85%
EPDP	874	3.43%	18,612	6.55%	24,942	0.27%
IP1D	362	1.42%	5,156	1.82%	6,121	0.07%
Other Parties (with < 1%)	99	0.39%	2,938	1.03%	764,786	8.28%
Valid Votes	25,507	92.88%	284,026	93.04%	9,241,931	94.52%
Rejected Votes	1,956	7.12%	21,233	6.96%	534,452	5.47%
Total Polled	27,463	50.78%	305,259	46.65%	9,777,821	75.74%
Registered Electors	54,087		654,415		12,909,631	

=== 2001 Sri Lankan Parliamentary Election ===
Party	Udupiddy		Jaffna Electoral District		Sri Lanka	
Party	Votes	%	Votes	%	Votes	%
TULF	12,493	71.95%	102,324	54.84%	348,164	3.89%
EPDP	3,385	19.49%	57,208	30.66%	72,783	0.81%
UNP	1,022	5.89%	16,245	8.71%	4,086,026	45.62%
Other Parties (with < 1%)	464	2.67%	10,821	5.80%	1,052,503	11.75%
Valid Votes	17,364	94.12%	186,598	94.59%	8,955,844	94.77%
Rejected Votes	1,084	5.88%	10,681	5.41%	494,009	5.23%
Total Polled	18,448	34.20%	197,279	31.14%	9,449,878	76.03%
Registered Electors	53,941		633,457		12,428,762	

=== 2000 Sri Lankan Parliamentary Election ===
Party	Udupiddy		Jaffna Electoral District		Sri Lanka	
Party	Votes	%	Votes	%	Votes	%
TULF	4,180	39.19%	32,761	28.50%	105,907	1.23%
ACTC	2,024	18.98%	10,618	9.24%	27,289	0.32%
EPDP	1,662	15.58%	41,536	36.13%	50,702	0.59%
UNP	1,046	9.81%	10,896	9.48%	3,451,765	40.12%
IG6	782	7.33%	2,058	1.79%	3,162	0.04%
IG2	328	3.08%	4,905	4.27%	31,443	0.37%
Other Parties (with < 1%)	290	2.72%	5,786	5.03%	897,300	10.43%
DPLF	243	2.28%	4,778	4.16%	20,655	0.24%
IG3	110	1.03%	1,633	1.42%	6,109	0.07%
Valid Votes	10,665	N/A	114,971	N/A	8,602,617	N/A

=== 1994 Sri Lankan Parliamentary Election ===
Party	Udupiddy		Jaffna Electoral District		Sri Lanka	
Party	Votes	%	Votes	%	Votes	%
IND2	5	62.50%	10,744	79.71%	16,690	0.21%
EPRLF	1	12.50%	263	1.95%	9,411	0.12%
SLMC	1	12.50%	2,098	15.56%	143,307	1.80%
IND1	1	12.50%	374	2.77%	48,199	0.61%
Valid Votes	8	100.00%	13,479	97.41%	7,943,688	95.20%

=== 1989 Sri Lankan Parliamentary Election ===
Party	Udupiddy		Jaffna Electoral District		Sri Lanka	
Party	Votes	%	Votes	%	Votes	%
INDI	1,587	49.70%	150,340	62.68%	175,579	3.14%
TULF	1,178	36.89%	60,013	25.02%	188,594	3.37%
DPLF	171	5.36%	7,993	3.33%	19,150	0.34%
ACTC	127	3.98%	7,610	3.17%	7,610	0.14%
SLMC	84	2.63%	8,439	3.52%	202,016	3.61%
UNP	46	1.44%	5,460	2.28%	2,838,005	50.71%
Valid Votes	3,193	89.36%	239,855	90.49%	5,596,468	93.87%
Rejected Votes	380	10.64%	25,203	9.51%	365,563	6.13%
Total Polled	3,573	6.88%	265,058	44.76%	5,962,031	63.60%
Registered Electors	51,943		592,210		9,374,164	

== Demographics ==
=== Ethnicity ===
The Udupiddy Polling Division has a Sri Lankan Tamil majority (99.6%) . In comparison, the Jaffna Electoral District (which contains the Udupiddy Polling Division) has a Sri Lankan Tamil majority (98.6%)

Ethnicity in Udupiddy
1. Sri Lankan Tamil (99.6%)
2. Other (0.40%)

=== Religion ===
The Udupiddy Polling Division has a Hindu majority (95.9%) . In comparison, the Jaffna Electoral District (which contains the Udupiddy Polling Division) has a Hindu majority (82.6%) and a significant Roman Catholic population (12.6%)

Religion in Udupiddy
1. Hindu (95.9%)
2. Roman Catholic (2.50%)
3. Other Christian (1.30%)
4. Other (0.20%)
