= Nallur Polling Division =

Nallur
- Polling Division
- Coordinates: 9.653338°N 80.070757°E
- Country: Sri Lanka
- Province: Northern Province, Sri Lanka
- Electoral District: Jaffna Electoral District

Area
  - Total: 35.57 km^{2} (13.73 sq mi)

Population (2012)
  - Total: 68,142
  - Density: 1,916/km^{2} (4,960/sq mi)
- ISO 3166 code: EC-10I

The Nallur Polling Division is a Polling Division in the Jaffna Electoral District, in the Northern Province, Sri Lanka.

== Presidential Election Results ==
=== Summary ===
The winner of Nallur has matched the final country result 3 out of 8 times.

Year	Nallur	Jaffna Electoral District	MAE %	Sri Lanka	MAE %
2019	NDF	NDF	1.86%	SLPP	42.89%
2015	NDF	NDF	5.05%	NDF	29.06%
2010	NDF	NDF	5.00%	UPFA	33.12%
2005	UNP	UNP	6.04%	UPFA	16.65%
1999	PA	PA	1.23%	PA	2.91%
1994	PA	PA	5.00%	PA	27.86%
1988	SLFP	SLFP	2.52%	UNP	16.64%
1982	ACTC	ACTC	8.41%	UNP	22.18%
Matches/Mean MAE	3/8	3/8	4.39%	8/8	23.91%

=== 2019 Sri Lankan Presidential Election ===
Party	Nallur		Jaffna Electoral District		Sri Lanka	
Party	Votes	%	Votes	%	Votes	%
NDF	27,605	86.02%	312,722	83.86%	5,564,239	41.99%
SLPP	1,836	5.72%	23,261	6.24%	6,924,255	52.25%
Other Parties (with < 1%)	1,518	4.73%	23,295	6.25%	717,212	5.41%
IND10	659	2.05%	6,845	1.84%	12,256	0.09%
DUNF	475	1.48%	6,790	1.82%	34,537	0.26%
Valid Votes	32,093	97.43%	372,913	97.07%	13,252,499	98.99%
Rejected Votes	848	2.57%	11,251	2.93%	135,452	1.01%
Total Polled	32,941	70.25%	384,164	68.00%	13,387,951	83.71%
Registered Electors	46,888		564,984		15,992,568	

=== 2015 Sri Lankan Presidential Election ===
Party	Nallur		Jaffna Electoral District		Sri Lanka	
Party	Votes	%	Votes	%	Votes	%
NDF	24,929	79.87%	253,574	74.42%	6,217,162	51.28%
UPFA	5,405	17.32%	74,454	21.85%	5,768,090	47.58%
Other Parties (with < 1%)	878	2.81%	12,723	3.73%	138,200	1.14%
Valid Votes	31,212	97.93%	340,751	97.14%	12,123,452	98.85%
Rejected Votes	660	2.07%	10,038	2.86%	140,925	1.15%
Total Polled	31,872	68.25%	350,789	64.22%	12,264,377	78.69%
Registered Electors	46,699		546,265		15,585,942	

=== 2010 Sri Lankan Presidential Election ===
Party	Nallur		Jaffna Electoral District		Sri Lanka	
Party	Votes	%	Votes	%	Votes	%
NDF	11,543	70.42%	113,877	63.84%	4,173,185	40.15%
UPFA	3,554	21.68%	44,154	24.75%	6,015,934	57.88%
Other Parties (with < 1%)	694	4.23%	10,438	5.85%	132,316	1.27%
UDF	231	1.41%	3,325	1.86%	23,290	0.22%
DUNF	196	1.20%	3,370	1.89%	39,226	0.38%
Ind 5	173	1.06%	3,205	1.80%	9,662	0.09%
Valid Votes	16,391	96.71%	178,369	96.35%	10,393,613	99.03%
Rejected Votes	557	3.29%	6,763	3.65%	101,838	0.97%
Total Polled	16,948	23.36%	185,132	25.15%	10,495,451	66.70%
Registered Electors	72,558		736,032		15,734,587	

=== 2005 Sri Lankan Presidential Election ===
Party	Nallur		Jaffna Electoral District		Sri Lanka	
Party	Votes	%	Votes	%	Votes	%
UNP	198	64.29%	5,523	70.20%	4,706,366	48.43%
UPFA	100	32.47%	1,967	25.00%	4,887,152	50.29%
Other Parties (with < 1%)	6	1.95%	347	4.41%	118,439	1.22%
DUA	4	1.30%	31	0.39%	5,082	0.05%
Valid Votes	308	98.40%	7,868	92.30%	9,717,039	98.88%
Rejected Votes	5	1.60%	656	7.70%	109,869	1.12%
Total Polled	313	0.45%	8,524	1.20%	9,826,908	69.51%
Registered Electors	70,251		707,970		14,136,979	

=== 1999 Sri Lankan Presidential Election ===
Party	Nallur		Jaffna Electoral District		Sri Lanka	
Party	Votes	%	Votes	%	Votes	%
PA	5,125	47.55%	52,043	46.65%	4,312,157	51.12%
UNP	4,834	44.85%	48,005	43.03%	3,602,748	42.71%
Other Parties (with < 1%)	378	3.51%	6,256	5.61%	469,886	5.57%
LDA	328	3.04%	3,394	3.04%	23,668	0.28%
Ind 2	113	1.05%	1,873	1.68%	27,052	0.32%
Valid Votes	10,778	96.56%	111,568	94.91%	8,435,754	97.69%
Rejected Votes	384	3.44%	5,981	5.09%	199,536	2.31%
Total Polled	11,162	17.50%	117,549	19.15%	8,635,290	72.17%
Registered Electors	63,799		613,718		11,965,536	

=== 1994 Sri Lankan Presidential Election ===
Party	Nallur		Jaffna Electoral District		Sri Lanka	
Party	Votes	%	Votes	%	Votes	%
PA	21	91.30%	16,934	96.35%	4,709,205	62.28%
UNP	2	8.70%	223	1.27%	2,715,283	35.91%
Valid Votes	23	100.00%	17,575	99.20%	7,561,526	98.03%

=== 1988 Sri Lankan Presidential Election ===
Party	Nallur		Jaffna Electoral District		Sri Lanka	
Party	Votes	%	Votes	%	Votes	%
SLFP	3,362	40.57%	44,197	36.82%	2,289,857	44.95%
SLMP	2,924	35.29%	42,198	35.15%	235,701	4.63%
UNP	2,000	24.14%	33,650	28.03%	2,569,199	50.43%
Valid Votes	8,286	94.50%	120,045	93.38%	5,094,754	98.24%
Rejected Votes	482	5.50%	8,517	6.62%	91,499	1.76%
Total Polled	8,768	14.16%	128,562	23.30%	5,186,256	55.87%
Registered Electors	61,936		551,713		9,283,143	

=== 1982 Sri Lankan Presidential Election ===
Party	Nallur		Jaffna Electoral District		Sri Lanka	
Party	Votes	%	Votes	%	Votes	%
ACTC	8,979	47.36%	87,263	40.03%	173,934	2.67%
UNP	4,831	25.48%	44,775	20.54%	3,450,815	52.93%
SLFP	4,330	22.84%	77,210	35.42%	2,546,348	39.05%
LSSP	332	1.75%	3,376	1.55%	58,531	0.90%
JVP	244	1.29%	3,098	1.42%	273,428	4.19%
NSSP	243	1.28%	2,176	1.00%	16,995	0.26%
Valid Votes	18,959	95.50%	218,003	95.36%	6,520,156	98.78%
Rejected Votes	894	4.50%	10,610	4.64%	80,470	1.22%
Total Polled	19,853	40.32%	228,613	45.86%	6,600,626	80.15%
Registered Electors	49,233		498,545		8,235,358	

== Parliamentary Election Results ==
=== Summary ===
The winner of Nallur has matched the final country result 0 out of 7 times.

Year	Nallur	Jaffna Electoral District	MAE %	Sri Lanka	MAE %
2015	ITAK	ITAK	0.56%	UNP	37.17%
2010	ITAK	ITAK	7.19%	UPFA	29.66%
2004	ITAK	ITAK	3.49%	UPFA	5.91%
2001	TULF	TULF	5.81%	UNP	19.39%
2000	TULF	EPDP	6.84%	PA	11.21%
1994	IND1	IND2	33.80%	PA	0.42%
1989	INDI	INDI	11.09%	UNP	27.91%
Matches/Mean MAE	0/7	0/7	9.83%	7/7	18.81%

=== 2015 Sri Lankan Parliamentary Election ===
Party	Nallur		Jaffna Electoral District		Sri Lanka	
Party	Votes	%	Votes	%	Votes	%
ITAK	18,793	70.06%	207,577	70.08%	515,963	4.63%
AITC	2,420	9.02%	15,022	5.07%	18,644	0.17%
EPDP	2,005	7.47%	30,232	10.21%	33,481	0.30%
UNP	1,662	6.20%	20,025	6.76%	5,098,916	45.77%
UPFA	1,444	5.38%	17,309	5.84%	4,732,664	42.48%
Other Parties (with < 1%)	500	1.86%	6,034	2.04%	580,476	5.21%
Valid Votes	26,824	92.95%	296,199	90.91%	11,140,333	95.35%
Rejected Votes	1,707	5.91%	25,496	7.83%	516,926	4.42%
Total Polled	28,859	61.80%	325,805	61.56%	11,684,111	77.66%
Registered Electors	46,699		529,239		15,044,490	

=== 2010 Sri Lankan Parliamentary Election ===
Party	Nallur		Jaffna Electoral District		Sri Lanka	
Party	Votes	%	Votes	%	Votes	%
ITAK	7,490	54.77%	65,119	44.03%	233,190	2.91%
UPFA	3,467	25.35%	47,622	32.20%	4,846,388	60.38%
UNP	896	6.55%	12,624	8.54%	2,357,057	29.37%
AITC	730	5.34%	6,362	4.30%	7,544	0.09%
Other Parties (with < 1%)	562	4.11%	8,480	5.73%	481,988	6.01%
IG4J	194	1.42%	2,151	1.45%	2,151	0.03%
TULF	188	1.37%	2,892	1.96%	9,223	0.11%
IG1J	148	1.08%	2,648	1.79%	2,648	0.03%
Valid Votes	13,675	90.62%	147,898	87.89%	8,026,322	96.03%
Rejected Votes	1,334	8.84%	19,774	11.75%	581,465	6.96%
Total Polled	15,091	20.80%	168,277	22.68%	8,358,246	59.29%
Registered Electors	72,558		742,005		14,097,690	

=== 2004 Sri Lankan Parliamentary Election ===
Party	Nallur		Jaffna Electoral District		Sri Lanka	
Party	Votes	%	Votes	%	Votes	%
ITAK	22,321	86.99%	257,320	90.60%	633,203	6.85%
EPDP	2,431	9.47%	18,612	6.55%	24,942	0.27%
IP1D	800	3.12%	5,156	1.82%	6,121	0.07%
Other Parties (with < 1%)	107	0.42%	2,938	1.03%	764,786	8.28%
Valid Votes	25,659	94.60%	284,026	93.04%	9,241,931	94.52%
Rejected Votes	1,465	5.40%	21,233	6.96%	534,452	5.47%
Total Polled	27,124	40.08%	305,259	46.65%	9,777,821	75.74%
Registered Electors	67,672		654,415		12,909,631	

=== 2001 Sri Lankan Parliamentary Election ===
Party	Nallur		Jaffna Electoral District		Sri Lanka	
Party	Votes	%	Votes	%	Votes	%
TULF	11,787	61.30%	102,324	54.84%	348,164	3.89%
EPDP	4,565	23.74%	57,208	30.66%	72,783	0.81%
UNP	1,970	10.24%	16,245	8.71%	4,086,026	45.62%
Other Parties (with < 1%)	356	1.85%	4,780	2.56%	944,257	10.54%
SLMC	334	1.74%	3,364	1.80%	105,346	1.18%
INDP	217	1.13%	2,677	1.43%	2,900	0.03%
Valid Votes	19,229	97.23%	186,598	94.59%	8,955,844	94.77%
Rejected Votes	547	2.77%	10,681	5.41%	494,009	5.23%
Total Polled	19,776	29.49%	197,279	31.14%	9,449,878	76.03%
Registered Electors	67,057		633,457		12,428,762	

=== 2000 Sri Lankan Parliamentary Election ===
Party	Nallur		Jaffna Electoral District		Sri Lanka	
Party	Votes	%	Votes	%	Votes	%
TULF	3,587	34.76%	32,761	28.50%	105,907	1.23%
EPDP	2,560	24.81%	41,536	36.13%	50,702	0.59%
UNP	1,523	14.76%	10,896	9.48%	3,451,765	40.12%
ACTC	1,262	12.23%	10,618	9.24%	27,289	0.32%
IG3	406	3.93%	1,633	1.42%	6,109	0.07%
Other Parties (with < 1%)	343	3.32%	7,844	6.82%	900,462	10.47%
IG2	342	3.31%	4,905	4.27%	31,443	0.37%
DPLF	295	2.86%	4,778	4.16%	20,655	0.24%
Valid Votes	10,318	N/A	114,971	N/A	8,602,617	N/A

=== 1994 Sri Lankan Parliamentary Election ===
Party	Nallur		Jaffna Electoral District		Sri Lanka	
Party	Votes	%	Votes	%	Votes	%
IND1	9	47.37%	374	2.77%	48,199	0.61%
IND2	8	42.11%	10,744	79.71%	16,690	0.21%
EPRLF	2	10.53%	263	1.95%	9,411	0.12%
Valid Votes	19	95.00%	13,479	97.41%	7,943,688	95.20%
Rejected Votes	1	5.00%	358	2.59%	400,395	4.80%
Total Polled	20	0.03%	13,837	2.32%	8,344,095	74.75%
Registered Electors	62,372		596,375		11,163,064	

=== 1989 Sri Lankan Parliamentary Election ===
Party	Nallur		Jaffna Electoral District		Sri Lanka	
Party	Votes	%	Votes	%	Votes	%
INDI	21,123	76.17%	150,340	62.68%	175,579	3.14%
TULF	4,211	15.18%	60,013	25.02%	188,594	3.37%
ACTC	1,137	4.10%	7,610	3.17%	7,610	0.14%
DPLF	531	1.91%	7,993	3.33%	19,150	0.34%
SLMC	410	1.48%	8,439	3.52%	202,016	3.61%
UNP	320	1.15%	5,460	2.28%	2,838,005	50.71%
Valid Votes	27,732	95.28%	239,855	90.49%	5,596,468	93.87%
Rejected Votes	1,375	4.72%	25,203	9.51%	365,563	6.13%
Total Polled	29,107	47.23%	265,058	44.76%	5,962,031	63.60%
Registered Electors	61,624		592,210		9,374,164	

== Demographics ==
=== Ethnicity ===
The Nallur Polling Division has a Sri Lankan Tamil majority (99.2%) . In comparison, the Jaffna Electoral District (which contains the Nallur Polling Division) has a Sri Lankan Tamil majority (98.6%)

Ethnicity in Nallur
1. Sri Lankan Tamil (99.2%)
2. Other (0.80%)

=== Religion ===
The Nallur Polling Division has a Hindu majority (90.4%) . In comparison, the Jaffna Electoral District (which contains the Nallur Polling Division) has a Hindu majority (82.6%) and a significant Roman Catholic population (12.6%)

Religion in Nallur
1. Hindu (90.4%)
2. Roman Catholic (5.10%)
3. Other Christian (4.00%)
4. Other (0.50%)
