= New Democratic Front (Sri Lanka) =

Centre-right Sri Lankan political party

New Democratic Front නව ප්‍රජාතන්ත්‍රවාදී පෙරමුණ புதிய ஜனநாயக முன்னணி
- Abbreviation: NDF
- Leader: Ranil Wickremesinghe
- Chairperson: Uditha Devasurendra
- Secretary: Shyamila Perera
- Parliamentary leader: Anuradha Jayaratne
- Founder: Srimani Athulathmudali
- Founded: 1995; 31 years ago
- Split from: Democratic United National Front
- Headquarters: 9/6 Jayanthi Mawatha, Pelawatte, Battaramulla
- Ideology: Neoliberalism; Economic liberalism
- Political position: Centre-right
- National affiliation: United National Party
- Colors: Green; Yellow; Orange; Blue
- Slogan: "Look for What is Right - Not Who is Right"
- Parliament of Sri Lanka: 6 / 225

Election symbol
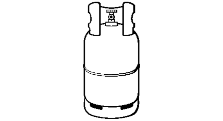
- Gas cylinder (since 2024); Swan (2009–2024)

The New Democratic Front (abbrv. NDF; Sinhala: නව ප්‍රජාතන්ත්‍රවාදී පෙරමුණ, romanized: Nawa Prajāthanthravādī Peramuna, Tamil: புதிய ஜனநாயக முன்னணி, romanized: Pudiya Jaṉanāyaka Muṉṉaṇi) is a political alliance in Sri Lanka. It was formed as a political party in 1995 after Srimani Athulathmudali, widow of assassinated politician Lalith Athulathmudali, split from the Democratic United National Front.

The party was originally named the Democratic United National Lalith Front, after the politician, until it was renamed in 2009. In 2010, 2015, and 2019, the party served as a political front for supporting Sri Lankan presidential candidates in presidential elections by the United National Party and its allies. In 2024, the party was relaunched as an alliance of MPs loyal to former president Ranil Wickremesinghe who had also supported the president in his unsuccessful reelection campaign. The alliance contested the 2024 Sri Lankan parliamentary elections and won six seats.

== History ==
In the early 1990s, Lalith Athulathmudali was a prominent United National Party politician and dissident of president Ranasinghe Premadasa and a potential challenger to Premadasa for the UNP candidacy in the upcoming presidential elections. He was removed from the UNP and formed his own political party, the Democratic United National Front, alongside other UNP dissidents. Athulathmudali was controversially assassinated on 23 April 1993, which was widely believed to have been orchestrated by Premadasa himself. Two years after his assassination, a split in the Democratic United National Front would lead to his widow, Srimani Athulathmudali, establishing her own political party, the Democratic United National Lalith Front.

In 2009, the party was renamed as the New Democratic Front (NDF).

=== 2010 presidential election ===

In 2010, General Sarath Fonseka, a former Chief of Defence Staff and former Commander of the Sri Lanka Army, was the NDF candidate in the 2010 presidential elections. He was contesting in the elections as the "joint opposition candidate", and was supported by the United National Party (UNP) and the Janatha Vimukthi Peramuna (JVP), the two main opposition parties, among others. Fonseka was one of the two main candidates of the election, along with then-incumbent President Mahinda Rajapaksa, however Fonseka lost the election to Rajapaksa by a significant margin.

=== 2015 presidential election ===
In December 2014, former general-secretary of the Sri Lanka Freedom Party (SLFP) and presidential candidate Maithripala Sirisena deposited his bond for the 2015 presidential elections, under the "symbol of the swan" of the National Democratic Front. Sirisena won the presidential election and was sworn in as the new President of Sri Lanka on 9 January 2015 after defeating incumbent president Mahinda Rajapaksa. Sirisena would also go on to replace Rajapaksa as the Chairman of the Sri Lanka Freedom Party.

=== 2019 presidential election ===
In 2019, Sajith Premadasa, deputy leader of the UNP and son of former president Ranasinghe Premadasa, was the NDF candidate in the 2019 presidential election. Premadasa lost the election to Sri Lanka Podujana Peramuna (SLPP) candidate Gotabaya Rajapaksa.

=== 2024 parliamentary election ===
In September 2024, following then-incumbent president Ranil Wickremesinghe's loss in the presidential elections, the NDF was relaunched as a political alliance of MPs and parties who supported Wickremesinghe's campaign. The alliance changed its logo from a swan to a gas cylinder and contested in the 2024 parliamentary elections under the leadership of Wickremesinghe. Wickremesinghe, who did not run for parliament himself, endorsed the NDF and urged voters to vote for the party. The NDF ultimately won 5 seats and won the 3rd most votes nationally.

== Member parties ==
The NDF currently consists of the following parties:

- United National Party
- Sri Lanka Freedom Party
- Breakaway members of the Sri Lanka Podujana Peramuna
- Ceylon Workers' Congress
- Eelam People's Democratic Party
- Mahajana Eksath Peramuna
- National Congress
- National Unity Alliance
- New Lanka Freedom Party
- Sri Lanka Mahajana Pakshaya
- Tamil Makkal Viduthalai Pulikal

== Electoral history ==
=== Presidential ===
Election year	Candidate	Votes	%	Result
2010	Sarath Fonseka	4,173,185	40.15%	Lost
2015	Maithripala Sirisena	6,217,162	51.28%	Won
2019	Sajith Premadasa	5,564,239	41.99%	Lost

=== Parliamentary ===
Election year	Votes	Vote %	Seats won	+/–	Government
2020	4,883	0.04%	0 / 225	Steady	Extra-parliamentary
2024	500,835	4.49%	6 / 225	▲6 (Note: Including one seat won by the UNP.)	Opposition
