= Kuliyapitiya Polling Division =

Kuliyapitiya
- Polling Division
- Coordinates: 7.473902°N 80.110216°E
- Country: Sri Lanka
- Province: North Western Province, Sri Lanka
- Electoral District: Kurunegala Electoral District

Area
  - Total: 293.96 km^{2} (113.50 sq mi)

Population (2012)
  - Total: 131,378
  - Density: 447/km^{2} (1,160/sq mi)
- ISO 3166 code: EC-15I

The Kuliyapitiya Polling Division is a Polling Division in the Kurunegala Electoral District, in the North Western Province, Sri Lanka.

== Presidential Election Results ==
=== Summary ===
The winner of Kuliyapitiya has matched the final country result 7 out of 8 times.

Year	Kuliyapitiya	Kurunegala Electoral District	MAE %	Sri Lanka	MAE %
2019	SLPP	SLPP	4.84%	SLPP	0.70%
2015	UPFA	UPFA	2.81%	NDF	2.84%
2010	UPFA	UPFA	3.79%	UPFA	1.12%
2005	UPFA	UPFA	2.39%	UPFA	0.57%
1999	PA	PA	2.34%	PA	3.01%
1994	PA	PA	3.79%	PA	6.78%
1988	UNP	UNP	1.53%	UNP	2.15%
1982	UNP	UNP	1.94%	UNP	3.07%
Matches/Mean MAE	7/8	7/8	2.93%	8/8	2.53%

=== 2019 Sri Lankan Presidential Election ===
Party	Kuliyapitiya		Kurunegala Electoral District		Sri Lanka	
Party	Votes	%	Votes	%	Votes	%
SLPP	44,701	53.11%	652,278	57.90%	6,924,255	52.25%
NDF	35,807	42.54%	416,961	37.01%	5,564,239	41.99%
NMPP	2,159	2.57%	36,178	3.21%	418,553	3.16%
Other Parties (with < 1%)	1,500	1.78%	21,193	1.88%	345,452	2.61%
Valid Votes	84,167	99.30%	1,126,610	99.25%	13,252,499	98.99%
Rejected Votes	595	0.70%	8,522	0.75%	135,452	1.01%
Total Polled	84,762	84.54%	1,135,132	85.24%	13,387,951	83.71%
Registered Electors	100,268		1,331,705		15,992,568	

=== 2015 Sri Lankan Presidential Election ===
Party	Kuliyapitiya		Kurunegala Electoral District		Sri Lanka	
Party	Votes	%	Votes	%	Votes	%
UPFA	39,115	50.61%	556,868	53.46%	5,768,090	47.58%
NDF	37,528	48.55%	476,602	45.76%	6,217,162	51.28%
Other Parties (with < 1%)	651	0.84%	8,154	0.78%	138,200	1.14%
Valid Votes	77,294	99.27%	1,041,624	99.12%	12,123,452	98.85%
Rejected Votes	568	0.73%	9,285	0.88%	140,925	1.15%
Total Polled	77,862	77.49%	1,050,909	78.82%	12,264,377	78.69%
Registered Electors	100,474		1,333,377		15,585,942	

=== 2010 Sri Lankan Presidential Election ===
Party	Kuliyapitiya		Kurunegala Electoral District		Sri Lanka	
Party	Votes	%	Votes	%	Votes	%
UPFA	41,881	59.26%	582,784	63.08%	6,015,934	57.88%
NDF	27,813	39.36%	327,594	35.46%	4,173,185	40.15%
Other Parties (with < 1%)	974	1.38%	13,515	1.46%	204,494	1.97%
Valid Votes	70,668	99.51%	923,893	99.29%	10,393,613	99.03%
Rejected Votes	349	0.49%	6,644	0.71%	101,838	0.97%
Total Polled	71,017	74.96%	930,537	75.59%	10,495,451	66.70%
Registered Electors	94,743		1,230,966		15,734,587	

=== 2005 Sri Lankan Presidential Election ===
Party	Kuliyapitiya		Kurunegala Electoral District		Sri Lanka	
Party	Votes	%	Votes	%	Votes	%
UPFA	34,357	49.87%	468,507	52.26%	4,887,152	50.29%
UNP	33,874	49.17%	418,809	46.72%	4,706,366	48.43%
Other Parties (with < 1%)	661	0.96%	9,181	1.02%	123,521	1.27%
Valid Votes	68,892	99.05%	896,497	99.07%	9,717,039	98.88%
Rejected Votes	658	0.95%	8,458	0.93%	109,869	1.12%
Total Polled	69,550	77.52%	904,955	77.87%	9,826,908	69.51%
Registered Electors	89,722		1,162,099		14,136,979	

=== 1999 Sri Lankan Presidential Election ===
Party	Kuliyapitiya		Kurunegala Electoral District		Sri Lanka	
Party	Votes	%	Votes	%	Votes	%
PA	28,350	48.80%	377,483	50.77%	4,312,157	51.12%
UNP	27,228	46.86%	326,327	43.89%	3,602,748	42.71%
JVP	1,662	2.86%	27,354	3.68%	343,927	4.08%
Other Parties (with < 1%)	860	1.48%	12,355	1.66%	176,679	2.09%
Valid Votes	58,100	98.35%	743,519	97.99%	8,435,754	97.69%
Rejected Votes	977	1.65%	15,272	2.01%	199,536	2.31%
Total Polled	59,077	76.10%	758,791	75.83%	8,635,290	72.17%
Registered Electors	77,629		1,000,624		11,965,536	

=== 1994 Sri Lankan Presidential Election ===
Party	Kuliyapitiya		Kurunegala Electoral District		Sri Lanka	
Party	Votes	%	Votes	%	Votes	%
PA	29,638	55.55%	403,838	59.36%	4,709,205	62.28%
UNP	22,999	43.11%	266,740	39.21%	2,715,283	35.91%
Other Parties (with < 1%)	712	1.33%	9,766	1.44%	137,040	1.81%
Valid Votes	53,349	98.57%	680,344	98.48%	7,561,526	98.03%
Rejected Votes	773	1.43%	10,511	1.52%	151,706	1.97%
Total Polled	54,122	78.17%	690,855	76.97%	7,713,232	69.12%
Registered Electors	69,233		897,539		11,158,880	

=== 1988 Sri Lankan Presidential Election ===
Party	Kuliyapitiya		Kurunegala Electoral District		Sri Lanka	
Party	Votes	%	Votes	%	Votes	%
UNP	18,063	49.87%	198,662	51.12%	2,569,199	50.43%
SLFP	17,660	48.76%	182,220	46.89%	2,289,857	44.95%
SLMP	495	1.37%	7,717	1.99%	235,701	4.63%
Valid Votes	36,218	99.08%	388,599	98.91%	5,094,754	98.24%
Rejected Votes	338	0.92%	4,281	1.09%	91,499	1.76%
Total Polled	36,556	58.70%	392,880	53.49%	5,186,256	55.87%
Registered Electors	62,275		734,453		9,283,143	

=== 1982 Sri Lankan Presidential Election ===
Party	Kuliyapitiya		Kurunegala Electoral District		Sri Lanka	
Party	Votes	%	Votes	%	Votes	%
UNP	28,797	58.17%	345,769	55.77%	3,450,815	52.93%
SLFP	19,142	38.67%	248,479	40.08%	2,546,348	39.05%
JVP	1,247	2.52%	21,835	3.52%	273,428	4.19%
Other Parties (with < 1%)	320	0.65%	3,895	0.63%	249,460	3.83%
Valid Votes	49,506	99.22%	619,978	99.13%	6,520,156	98.78%
Rejected Votes	391	0.78%	5,431	0.87%	80,470	1.22%
Total Polled	49,897	87.10%	625,409	86.00%	6,600,626	80.15%
Registered Electors	57,287		727,202		8,235,358	

== Parliamentary Election Results ==
=== Summary ===
The winner of Kuliyapitiya has matched the final country result 5 out of 7 times. Hence, Kuliyapitiya is a Weak Bellwether for Parliamentary Elections.

Year	Kuliyapitiya	Kurunegala Electoral District	MAE %	Sri Lanka	MAE %
2015	UNP	UPFA	4.33%	UNP	3.55%
2010	UPFA	UPFA	5.51%	UPFA	3.84%
2004	UPFA	UPFA	2.20%	UPFA	4.28%
2001	UNP	UNP	1.46%	UNP	4.12%
2000	UNP	PA	4.16%	PA	3.09%
1994	UNP	PA	2.46%	PA	2.62%
1989	UNP	UNP	0.47%	UNP	5.45%
Matches/Mean MAE	5/7	6/7	2.94%	7/7	3.85%

=== 2015 Sri Lankan Parliamentary Election ===
Party	Kuliyapitiya		Kurunegala Electoral District		Sri Lanka	
Party	Votes	%	Votes	%	Votes	%
UNP	37,037	50.81%	441,275	45.87%	5,098,916	45.77%
UPFA	32,951	45.20%	474,124	49.29%	4,732,664	42.48%
JVP	2,299	3.15%	41,077	4.27%	544,154	4.88%
Other Parties (with < 1%)	609	0.84%	5,496	0.57%	83,041	0.75%
Valid Votes	72,896	96.15%	961,972	95.39%	11,140,333	95.35%
Rejected Votes	2,901	3.83%	46,036	4.56%	516,926	4.42%
Total Polled	75,818	75.46%	1,008,459	79.63%	11,684,111	77.66%
Registered Electors	100,474		1,266,443		15,044,490	

=== 2010 Sri Lankan Parliamentary Election ===
Party	Kuliyapitiya		Kurunegala Electoral District		Sri Lanka	
Party	Votes	%	Votes	%	Votes	%
UPFA	29,501	58.31%	429,316	63.91%	4,846,388	60.38%
UNP	19,146	37.84%	213,713	31.81%	2,357,057	29.37%
DNA	1,826	3.61%	26,440	3.94%	441,251	5.50%
Other Parties (with < 1%)	121	0.24%	2,288	0.34%	34,779	0.43%
Valid Votes	50,594	93.35%	671,757	92.58%	8,026,322	96.03%
Rejected Votes	3,558	6.56%	53,130	7.32%	581,465	6.96%
Total Polled	54,197	57.20%	725,566	59.08%	8,358,246	59.29%
Registered Electors	94,743		1,228,044		14,097,690	

=== 2004 Sri Lankan Parliamentary Election ===
Party	Kuliyapitiya		Kurunegala Electoral District		Sri Lanka	
Party	Votes	%	Votes	%	Votes	%
UPFA	29,878	49.25%	412,157	51.95%	4,223,126	45.70%
UNP	27,127	44.71%	340,768	42.95%	3,486,792	37.73%
JHU	3,413	5.63%	37,459	4.72%	552,723	5.98%
Other Parties (with < 1%)	249	0.41%	2,976	0.38%	64,640	0.70%
Valid Votes	60,667	94.56%	793,360	95.14%	9,241,931	94.52%
Rejected Votes	3,455	5.39%	40,261	4.83%	534,452	5.47%
Total Polled	64,157	74.24%	833,908	76.54%	9,777,821	75.74%
Registered Electors	86,416		1,089,482		12,909,631	

=== 2001 Sri Lankan Parliamentary Election ===
Party	Kuliyapitiya		Kurunegala Electoral District		Sri Lanka	
Party	Votes	%	Votes	%	Votes	%
UNP	30,901	50.71%	382,768	48.59%	4,086,026	45.62%
PA	25,266	41.46%	332,775	42.24%	3,330,815	37.19%
JVP	4,162	6.83%	63,652	8.08%	815,353	9.10%
Other Parties (with < 1%)	608	1.00%	8,533	1.08%	133,770	1.49%
Valid Votes	60,937	94.59%	787,728	95.35%	8,955,844	94.77%
Rejected Votes	3,482	5.41%	38,451	4.65%	494,009	5.23%
Total Polled	64,419	77.68%	826,179	78.98%	9,449,878	76.03%
Registered Electors	82,926		1,046,102		12,428,762	

=== 2000 Sri Lankan Parliamentary Election ===
Party	Kuliyapitiya		Kurunegala Electoral District		Sri Lanka	
Party	Votes	%	Votes	%	Votes	%
UNP	26,570	45.62%	308,106	41.86%	3,451,765	40.12%
PA	25,374	43.56%	358,794	48.75%	3,899,329	45.33%
JVP	2,916	5.01%	40,780	5.54%	518,725	6.03%
NUA	1,834	3.15%	11,927	1.62%	185,593	2.16%
SU	830	1.42%	6,691	0.91%	127,859	1.49%
Other Parties (with < 1%)	722	1.24%	9,730	1.32%	93,655	1.09%
Valid Votes	58,246	N/A	736,028	N/A	8,602,617	N/A

=== 1994 Sri Lankan Parliamentary Election ===
Party	Kuliyapitiya		Kurunegala Electoral District		Sri Lanka	
Party	Votes	%	Votes	%	Votes	%
UNP	27,173	49.49%	332,547	47.02%	3,498,370	44.04%
PA	27,109	49.38%	366,856	51.87%	3,887,805	48.94%
Other Parties (with < 1%)	619	1.13%	7,876	1.11%	158,616	2.00%
Valid Votes	54,901	96.10%	707,279	95.92%	7,943,688	95.20%
Rejected Votes	2,229	3.90%	30,071	4.08%	400,395	4.80%
Total Polled	57,130	82.52%	737,350	82.15%	8,344,095	74.75%
Registered Electors	69,233		897,580		11,163,064	

=== 1989 Sri Lankan Parliamentary Election ===
Party	Kuliyapitiya		Kurunegala Electoral District		Sri Lanka	
Party	Votes	%	Votes	%	Votes	%
UNP	24,386	58.14%	314,724	58.51%	2,838,005	50.71%
SLFP	15,487	36.92%	195,526	36.35%	1,785,369	31.90%
ELJP	1,448	3.45%	13,759	2.56%	67,723	1.21%
USA	441	1.05%	11,059	2.06%	141,983	2.54%
Other Parties (with < 1%)	183	0.44%	2,848	0.53%	90,480	1.62%
Valid Votes	41,945	94.46%	537,916	94.02%	5,596,468	93.87%
Rejected Votes	2,459	5.54%	34,212	5.98%	365,563	6.13%
Total Polled	44,404	72.42%	572,128	72.88%	5,962,031	63.60%
Registered Electors	61,316		784,991		9,374,164	

== Demographics ==
=== Ethnicity ===
The Kuliyapitiya Polling Division has a Sinhalese majority (84.6%) and a significant Moor population (14.4%) . In comparison, the Kurunegala Electoral District (which contains the Kuliyapitiya Polling Division) has a Sinhalese majority (91.4%)

Ethnicity in Kuliyapitiya
1. Sinhalese (84.6%)
2. Moor (14.4%)
3. Other (1.00%)

=== Religion ===
The Kuliyapitiya Polling Division has a Buddhist majority (80.5%) and a significant Muslim population (14.6%) . In comparison, the Kurunegala Electoral District (which contains the Kuliyapitiya Polling Division) has a Buddhist majority (88.5%)

Religion in Kuliyapitiya
1. Buddhist (80.5%)
2. Muslim (14.6%)
3. Roman Catholic (3.70%)
4. Other (1.20%)
