= Cabinet of Sri Lanka =

Council of ministers that form the central government of Sri Lanka

- Flag of Sri Lanka

- Emblem of Sri Lanka

Agency overview
- Formed: 16 October 1947; 78 years ago
- Type: Highest executive body of the Government of Sri Lanka
- Jurisdiction: Democratic Socialist Republic of Sri Lanka
- Headquarters: Colombo
- Agency executive: Anura Kumara Dissanayake, President of Sri Lanka
- Child agency: Ministries of the Sri Lanka Government
- Website: www.gov.lk Cabinet Office

In Sri Lanka, the Cabinet of Ministers is the council of senior ministers responsible and answerable to the Parliament of Sri Lanka. The President is a member of the cabinet and its head.

The Dissanayake cabinet is the incumbent central government of Sri Lanka led by President Anura Kumara Dissanayake.

== Background ==
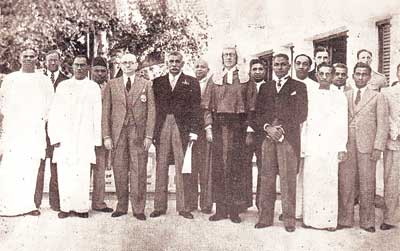
The first Cabinet of Ministers of Ceylon in 1947

The Executive Council of Ceylon was the Executive Council created in British Ceylon by the British colonial administration on the recommendations of the Colebrooke-Cameron Commission along with the Legislative Council of Ceylon, as the legislative body, on 13 March 1833.

At its creation the Executive Council was headed by the Governor, along with five members appointed by the Governor. These five members were officials who held the posts of the Colonial Secretary, the Attorney General, the Auditor-General, the Treasurer and the General Officer Commanding, Ceylon. The Council exercised executive power and advised the governor. As a result of the First Manning Reforms three non-officials were elected to the executive council.

With enactment of the new constitution of the Dominion of Ceylon in 1947 the Executive Council was replaced by a National Cabinet.

== Constitutional basis ==
As per the Sri Lankan Constitution, the President is a member of and head of the cabinet. The president appoints as Prime Minister, a Member of Parliament who has the confidence of parliament. Other ministers of the cabinet are appointed by the president in consultation with the prime minister. The president may appoint himself to any ministry he chooses. According to the constitution the president must be the Minister of Defence. The President also appoints, in consultation with the Prime Minister, non-cabinet ministers (state ministers, project ministers) and Deputy ministers.

== Powers and functions ==
Constitutionally, the Cabinet of Ministers charged with the direction and control of the Government of the Republic and is collectively responsible and answerable to Parliament. Cabinet ministers may table cabinet papers.

== Meetings ==
The cabinet meets on a regular basis, usually weekly on a Tuesday to discuss the most important issues of government policy. The president typically chairs the meeting and sets the agenda. All cabinet meetings are held behind closed doors and the minutes are kept confidential. The cabinet meets at the Old Parliament Building in Colombo.

== Committees ==
A cabinet committee is a subset of the larger Cabinet, consisting of a number of ministers who have responsibility in related areas of policy.

== Administration ==
The Cabinet office is located in the Republic Building and is headed by the Secretary to the Cabinet, appointed by the President.

== Privileges of office ==
=== Salary ===
A cabinet minister would receive a salary of Rs. 140,000, which was having been increased from 65,000 from January 2018 and is paid monthly from the respective ministry budget. In addition, since all ministers are members of parliament they are entitled to allowances and benefits of parliamentarians.

=== Official residence and office ===
It had been the practice for Cabinet ministers to be allocated an official residence, usually from 31 government bungalows, which were Class “A” type quarters built by the British Colonial Government of Ceylon along Bullers Road (now Bauddhaloka Mawatha) in the 1930s to house senior government officers. These mansions have a large drawing room, dining room, office room, and four large bedrooms. Since the 1980s these were allocated to ministers as their official residences due to security threats and the surrounding area, including part of Bauddhaloka Mawatha was closed to the public. Managed by the Ministry of Public Administration, the National People's Power government as stated in 2024, these bungalows will not be issued to ministers or state officials. President Dissanayake has stated that ministers will not be given houses in Colombo in the future.

=== Personal staff ===
Each Cabinet minister has an office and personal staff of 15 paid for by their ministry which includes a Private Secretary, a Coordinating Secretary, a Press Secretary, and a Public Relations Officer.

=== Travel ===
Each cabinet minister is entitled to two vehicles, which includes an official vehicle and a security vehicle provided and maintained by their ministry. For domestic air travel, helicopters from the No. 4 (VVIP/VIP) Helicopter Squadron of the Sri Lanka Air Force are charted by the ministry.

=== Security ===
Traditionally, security for the ministers has been provided by the Sri Lanka Police. During emergencies military units have been allocated to bolster security to certain ministers based on threat levels. Currently, the Ministerial Security Division is in charge of security of ministers.

=== Order of precedence ===
In the Sri Lankan order of precedence, the cabinet ministers are placed above the former presidents but below the provincial governors (within their respective province).

== See also ==
- List of ministries of Sri Lanka
- Ministers of the Sri Lanka Government
- Cabinet Office (Sri Lanka)
- List of female cabinet ministers of Sri Lanka
