= Order of precedence in Sri Lanka =

Relative preeminence of officials for ceremonial purposes

The Order of Precedence in Sri Lanka the protocol list at which Sri Lankan government officials are seated according to their rank. This is not the list of succession.

== Current Order of Precedence ==
1. President of Sri Lanka
2. Prime Minister of Sri Lanka
3. Speaker of the Parliament
4. Chief Justice of Sri Lanka
  1. Leader of the Opposition
  2. Ministers of the Cabinet of Sri Lanka
  3. Field marshal
  4. Governor of the Central Bank of Sri Lanka
5. Provincial Governors (within their respective provinces)
  1. Provincial Chief Ministers (within their respective provinces)
  2. State Ministers
  3. Deputy Speaker of Parliament
  4. Deputy Ministers
  5. Deputy Chairman of Committees
  6. Chief Government Whip
6. Ambassadors and High Commissioners (according to date of presentation of Letters of Credence or of assumption of duty) and Foreign Ministers and Envoys.
7. Members of the Constitutional Council
8. Attorney General of Sri Lanka
  1. Supreme Court Judges
  2. President of the Court of Appeal
9. Judges of the Court of Appeal
10. Members of the Parliament. There is no established order of precedence over members of parliament in general, although each party has its internal ranking.
  1. Provincial Council Chairmen, Provincial Ministers and Leaders of the Opposition of Provincial Councils (in their respective provinces)
  2. Members of Provincial Councils
11. Secretary to the President
12. Secretary to the Prime Minister
13. Secretary to the Cabinet of Ministers
14. Auditor General of Sri Lanka
  1. Secretaries of Cabinet Ministries/Senior Additional Secretaries to the President
    - Secretary General of Parliament
    - Chief of Staff of the Presidential Secretariat
    - Chairmen of the Commissions
    - Parliamentary Commissioner for Administration
    - Chief Secretaries
  2. Presidential Adviser
  3. Deputy Secretary to the Treasury
  4. Secretary General of the Constitutional Council
  5. Chairmen of the University Grants Commission
  6. Vice Chancellor appointed under the University Act
  7. Secretaries of State Ministries
  8. Additional Secretaries to the President
15. Chief of the Defence Staff
16. Heads of the Armed Forces, the Police and the Solicitor General
  - The Commander of the Army
  - The Commander of the Navy
  - The Commander of the Air Force
  - The Inspector General of the Police
  - Solicitor General
  - High Court Judges
17. Visiting Sri Lankan High Commissioners, Ambassador and Charges de Affaires
18. Additional Secretaries to the Prime Minister
19. Additional Secretaries to the Ministries
  - Directors General
  - Commissioners General
  - Controllers General
  - Heads of Departments

== Former Precedence Table for Ceylon ==
1. The Governor-General of Ceylon or Officer Administering the Government
2. The Prime Minister of Ceylon
3. The Chief Justice of Ceylon
4. The President of the Senate
5. The Speaker of the House of Representatives
6. Ministers of Cabinet rank (in the order of their appointment)
7. Ambassadors and High Commissioners (according to date of presentation of Letters of Credence or of assumption of duty) and Foreign Ministers and Envoys.
8. Ministers not of Cabinet rank
9. Attorney General
10. Puisne Judges
11. The Deputy President of the Senate, the Deputy Speaker; Parliamentary Secretaries, Deputy Chairman of Committees
12. Members of the Senate in their order
13. Members of the House of Representatives in their order
14. The Chairman, Public Service Commission
15. Members of the Public Service Commission and the Judicial Service Commission
16. The Secretary of the Treasury
17. The Permanent Secretaries; The Deputy Secretary of the Treasury (in the order of their seniority)
18. Auditor General
19. Commanding officers of Regular Ceylon Forces (if of the rank of Major General or equivalent)
20. Members of Class I Grade I of the Ceylon Civil Service and Members of the Special Class of the Judicial Service
21. Solicitor General
22. Members of Class I Grade II of the Ceylon Civil Service; Heads of large Departments; Members of Class I Grade I of the Judicial Service; The Secretary to the Governor-General; The Secretary to the Prime Minister.
23. The Clerk to the Senate
24. The Clerk to the House of Representatives
