= Assassination of Lalith Athulathmudali =

1993 murder in Kirulapana, Sri Lanka

Lalith Athulathmudali assassination
- Lalith Athulathmudali after the assassination
- Location: Kirulapana, Sri Lanka
- Date: April 23, 1993; 33 years ago 8:10 p.m. (Sri Lanka Time)
- Target: Lalith Athulathmudali
- Attack type: Automatic 9mm Pistol
- Deaths: 1 killed (Lalith Athulathmudali)
- Injuries: 1 wounded (Thilak Shantha - Athulathmudali's bodyguard)
- Perpetrators: Janaka Priyankara Jayamanne alias Wellampitiye Sudu Mahattaya and Liberation Tigers of Tamil Eelam

Lalith Athulathmudali, the former Cabinet Minister of Trade, National Security, Agriculture, Education and Deputy Minister of Defence of Sri Lanka was killed at 8:10 p.m. Sri Lanka Time (2.10 p.m. UTC) on 23 April 1993 in Kirulapana. Athulathmudali was fatally shot while addressing a gathering, approximately 4 weeks ahead of the May 1993 Provincial Council elections for the Western Province.

The investigation by Sri Lanka Police and Scotland Yard separately concluded that the assassination was carried out by a Tamil youth named Appiah Balakrishnan alias Ragunathan, who was affiliated to the LTTE. However these findings were widely disputed by people due to the political context of that time. In 1995, President Chandrika Bandaranaike Kumaratunga appointed a presidential commission to probe Athulathmudali's assassination, which had been an election promise of her 1994 presidential election campaign. The final commission report, submitted on October 7, 1997, pointed the finger at former President Ranasinghe Premadasa (1988–93) and security force personnel who were close to him as directly behind Athulathmudali's killing. Subsequently, a few security force members and underworld figures were arrested. They were eventually charged with conspiracy, aiding and abetting to commit murder. Three of the accused were killed during prosecution, raising further questions about the assassination. The Lalith Athulathmudali case remains the most controversial political assassination in recent Sri Lankan history.

== Background ==
=== Tension with Ranasinghe Premadasa ===
Lalith Athulathmudali had been one of the most prominent and powerful ministers in President J.R. Jayewardene’s government during 1977–88. Athulathmudali, Prime Minister Ranasinghe Premadasa and minister of Mahaweli Development Gamini Dissanayake were considered to be the closest contenders for the 1988 Sri Lankan presidential election. Prime Minister Ranasinghe Premadasa was nominated in the end. After the election victory of President Premadasa, Athulathmudali and Dissanayake were considered as the closest contenders to the post of Prime Minister. But circumventing both of them, Premadasa appointed D.B. Wijethunga as the Prime Minister. In 1989, Premadasa appointed his closest associate Sirisena Cooray to the post of national organizer of UNP overlooking Lalith Athulathmudali. Similarly, Athulathmudali and Dissanayake were deprived of a series of important posts within government and the party. These acts caused a great tension between Premadasa fraction and the Athulathmudali fraction of the party. The disappearance of dramatist Luxman Perera – who was a close ally of Athulathmudali, also caused the rift to intensify.

=== Impeachment motion ===
This resulted in Athulathmudali fraction bringing an impeachment motion against President Premadasa in 1991. The motion included 24 cases of alleged abuses of power, including illegal land deals and failing to consult the cabinet (thus violating the constitution). Although the speaker of the parliament rejected the motion in October 1991, it put the Premadasa government in grave danger. Subsequently, Athulathmudali and Dissanayake resigned from their ministerial posts. They and their allies were expelled from the party.

=== Establishment of Democratic United National Front ===
They formed a separate political party known as Democratic United National Front (DUNF) on November 28, 1991. Athulathmudali was elected as its leader. Four times during 1991–92, Athulathmudali and his supporters were physically attacked allegedly by thugs or supporters of the president. These incidents occurred on November 2, 1991, at Pannala, April 23, 1992, at Madapatha, August 7, 1992, at Fort railway station and August 29, 1992, at Dehiwala. On March 16, 1993, the government dissolved the seven provincial councils and announced the elections dates due to be on May 17, 1993. Athulathmudali handed over his papers to contest, seeking the chief ministership of the Western Province Council on the DUNF ticket.

== Assassination ==
On April 23, 1993, Athulathmudali was scheduled to address meetings held at Borella, Aluthkade and Kirulapana. He finished addressing two other meetings and arrived at Kirulapana at 8:00 p.m. There were about 1,000 people present. As it was raining, people moved closer to the stage, some even climbing under it. Suddenly, the assassin came near Athulathmudali, pulled out a gun and shot him three times. At this moment, a bodyguard of Athulathmudali named Thilak Shantha fired at the assassin and hit him on the right side of his abdomen. The assassin also shot at the bodyguard and ran away. Athulathmudali was taken to the hospital but succumbed to his wounds around 8:50 p.m.

The police came to the crime scene and cordoned the area. Subsequent search operations found nothing. On the following morning (April 24), the police found a slain body some 200m from the stage where Athulathmudali had been shot. Police found an automatic 9mm pistol with two magazines and several rounds of live ammunition, empty cartridge cases, a hand grenade, a national identity card and a little money. The Colombo Judicial Medical Officer, Dr. L.B. De Alwis, held a postmortem and recorded the cause of the death of Athulathmudali as fatal firearm wounds to the liver, heart and lungs. He identified the cause of the death of the slain Tamil youth, Appiah Balakrishnan alias Ragunathan, as cyanide poisoning. There was a non-fatal wound found on his lower back (not on the right abdomen as described by the bodyguard Thilak Shantha).

== Police investigation ==
Police investigators immediately pointed their fingers at LTTE, a separatist terrorist organisation which had been waging a war against the state since 1983. When Athulathmudali had been the minister of defense in the J.R. Jayawardene government, he had taken stern action against the group, sparking their anger towards him. LTTE had killed a number of parliamentarians and local body members during the period, so the police's point of view had a certain credibility. The police asserted that Ragunathan, whose body had appeared the next morning, was the gunman who had killed Athulathmudali. The fact that the Judicial Medical Officer Dr. Lalantha de Alwis, who conducted the autopsy on the body, had testified that the body smelled of potassium cyanide (which LTTEers had used over the years to commit suicide) and that he found pieces of glass in the mouth of the body, stood as strong evidence to support the police. Police determined that the youth known as Ragunathan was a LTTE activist. According to their view, LTTE had sent Ragunathan to kill Athulathmudali, and Ragunathan then bit his suicide capsule to evade capture, since he had been shot by the bodyguard.

== Scotland Yard investigation ==
President Ranasinghe Premadasa invited a team of Scotland Yard detectives and pathologists to further investigate the assassination. They arrived in the country on April 26. During their course of investigation, on May 1, 1993, President Premadasa was killed by a suicide bombing carried out by the LTTE.

Scotland Yard reported to the then appointed D.B. Wijethunge government that they had found a minute trace of cyanide in Ragunathan's blood sample which they had taken at a second postmortem of the youth. Concluding their investigation, detective superintendent Alec Edwards of the Investigation and Crime Branch of New Scotland Yard forwarded an undated report to the government.

=== The findings of Scotland Yard ===
The report included the following findings:

- The person now known to be Ragunathan, alias Appaiah Balakrishnan, shot and killed Athulathmudali and was later found dead at scene 2.
- Seriously injured and fearing imminent capture, he undoubtedly took his life by way of cyanide poisoning.
- There was no evidence, direct or circumstantial, to support the allegation that this tragedy was orchestrated by or in any way linked to the Sri Lankan Government, UNP members or other official agencies including the police.
- An analytical study of LTTE's modus operandi showed that this act was in total concert with their current subversive activities.

== Controversy ==
The circumstances regarding the death of Athulathmudali remained intensely controversial in the social and political arenas. The following facts made the official version of the assassination suspicious.

- It was reported that Rukman de Silva, a Senior Superintendent of Police, had instructed his officers not to provide police protection to the opposition political parties at their public meetings during the provincial election.
- On April 23, the Inspector of Police, Ranagala, who was the OIC of Kirulapone, sent two police officers to tape record the speeches made at the DUNF meeting.
- A police search found nothing on the night of the assassination. It was only on the following morning that Kirulapana police found the dead body of Ragunathan just 200m from the stage.
- For the second postmortem done by Dr. R.T. Shepherd on Ragunathan's body, no one had taken permission from the magistrate, which was absolutely necessary under the circumstances.
- It was found that Ragunathan had come to Colombo to go abroad. He was alone. There was no evidence to link him to the LTTE.

Those pieces of evidence, combined with the political friction between Athulathmudali and President Premadasa, made many independent investigators suspicious about an involvement of the president with this assassination. However, Premadasa repeatedly pleaded his innocence. He also made the favourite statement, "Assassinate me if you wish, but don't assassinate my character, which I have cherished from my childhood," regarding Athulathmudali's murder.

== Presidential commission on Athulathmudali assassination ==
In 1994, Chandrika Kumarathunga's People's Alliance government came into power, defeating the 17 year UNP rule. One of the major election promises of her 1994 presidential election campaign was to inquire the unaccounted disappearances and assassinations during UNP's rule. Thus in 1995, she appointed a 3-person presidential commission to probe the death of Athulathmudali. It was composed of justice Tissa Bandaranayake, justice Padmasiri Gunasekera and judge of the High Court, Nimal Gamini Amaratunge. Although the commission was due to submit report in 3 months time, it took more than 2 years to complete the investigation. Commission submitted its final report on October 7, 1997.

The commission found that the firearm wound on Ragunathan was caused by a shot fired at a very close range with a doctored and tampered 9 mm cartridge. For this to have happened he should’ve been in someone's captivity when he was shot. This is because the bodyguard had shot the killer at a distance greater than that. Ragunathan had his wound on his lower back, not on the right side of the abdomen.

The commission also concluded that evidence gathered suggests that cyanide was administered to him forcibly, not that he bit the cyanide capsule himself. It also ruled out LTTE from the assassination plot. Commission also pointed out that Ragunathan was also killed by the gang which had killed Athulathmudali.

=== The persons implicated by the commission ===
It implicated following people for the dual murder:

- Arambawalage Don Ranjith Upali de Silva alias Soththi Upali – he was implicated on murdering victim number 2, Appiah Balakrishnan alias Ragunathan. Soththi Upali was assumed to be the god father of the Colombo underworld during that time. He had been said to have close political links, most importantly B. Sirisena Cooray, the minister of housing and construction at that time. Upali served as a reserve sub inspector at one time. He was later included in the UNP executive body by President Premadasa.
- Uswatte Liyanage Senivaratne - a provincial councilor of the UNP for the Western Province. He was accused of the offences of unlawful assault, voluntarily causing hurt while being armed with deadly weapons to wit; pistol, iron rods, clubs etc. and wrongful restraint, criminal intimidation, offences punishable under the Penal Code in respect of the Fort Railway Station incident on August 7, 1992, and conspiracy to kill Lalith W. Athulathmudali on April 23, 1993.
- Janaka Priyanka Jayamanna alias Wellampitiye Sudumahattaya – he was identified as the assassin of Lalith Athulathmudali.
- Wathudula Bandulage Somaratne alias Konda Some – another prominent underworld figure.
- K. Nandasiri Karunatilake alias Nandana – a mobster and a close associate of Soththi Upali.
- Bulathsinhalage Srisena Cooray - the minister of Housing and Construction of the Premadasa government. He was considered as the right-hand man of President Ranasinghe Premadasa.
- Bulathsinhalage Ajith Coorey - the son of Srisena Cooray.

=== Negligence/involvement of police ===
The commission report also added that the police has contributed to the assassination by failing to give adequate security to the meeting, disregard of vital evidence, not submitting a complete report to the magistrate and avoiding questioning witnesses on relevant matters. Report also implicated ASP Lugoda, IP Dharmawardene, SI Sunil Shantha and IP Ekhanayake on falsification and tampering of evidence and fraudulent conduct. Senivaratne, Gunaratne, Dharmawardene, Basil, Jayasinghe, Devasundara, Aabdeen, Nilaabdeen, Deepthi Wijewickrema and other CDB officers were accused of conducting an unsatisfactory probe on Ragunathan's death. Galgamuwa of the Wellawatte police is seen showing weapons to underworld gangsters at the police station. Adhikari of the Borella police had given protection to criminals, particularly to Soththi Upali, whom he addressed as "chief". Devasundara and Ilabdeen visited Ragunathan, who was held in captivity in Gothami Road. The report in its last paragraphs pointed out finger towards President Premadasa for the assassination of Lalith Athulathmudali.

Based on the commission report, on September 8, 1998, Devasundara, Inspector of Police in charge of the local unit of the Terrorism Investigation Department (TID) was arrested in Anuradhapura. Later Soththi Upali, Malwatte Some, U.L. Seneviratne, B.G. Devasurendra and A. Abdeen were arrested and charged with conspiracy, aiding and abetting to commit murder and unlawful detention of Ragunathan. B. Sirisena Cooray was also arrested later and released. He continues to deny their involvement of the assassination until now. Subsequently, three of the chief suspects, Arambawalage Don Ranjith Upali de Silva alias Soththi Upali, Janaka Priyanka Jayamanna alias Wellampitiye Sudumahattaya and K. Nandasiri Karunatilake alias Nandana were assassinated.

== Circumstances regarding Soththi Upali’s death ==
Soththi Upali was shot dead on December 17, 1998, while returning home from the magistrate courts in Colombo, where he has been charged in connection with the assassination. It was reported that two vehicles have followed the bus in which Upali was traveling from Colombo to Piliyandala. As soon as he got down at Bokundara, he was shot and then dragged into one of the vehicles and taken to a place about 4 km from Bokundara, shot again and dropped. Prior to that, in late February 1998 at Borella, Nandana was killed at the presence of Upali. But he had luckily got escaped. A rival underworld gang led by Dhammika Amarasinghe, the brother of Upali's archrival Chinthaka Amarasinghe – who was killed by Upali, a few years earlier – was said to be responsible for these assassinations.

== Thilak Shantha’s confession ==
When those who were implicated by the presidential commission were tried in court, it was revealed that the assassin named by the commission, Wellampitye Sudumahattaya had no wounds on the right side of his abdomen, as earlier revealed by Lalith Athulathmudali's bodyguard Thilak Shantha. Thus Shantha was recalled to the court to question him on the issue. There he confessed that he had deliberately lied to the commission and the early investigators. He said the truth was that he shot at the assassin, but the bullet never hit the assassin. He said he lied to the commission and to the police at the instance of a President's Counsel who was watching the interests of Athulathmudali's family. Later Shantha was charged as an accomplice to the murder.

== Aftermath ==
The assassin of Lalith Athulathmudali, as implicated by commission, Janaka Priyankara Jayamanne alias Wellampitiye Sudu Mahattaya also was assassinated by rival underworld gangs at his Kolonnawa home on April 30, 2000. His wife also died in this shooting. Chandrika Kumarathunga's government was accused of giving asylum to the gangs led by Dhammika Amarasinghe who was responsible for these murders. In 2005, a suspect was apprehended by police in relation to Soththi Upali's murder. Interrogations revealed that he had been a body guard of the former Samurdi Minister S. B. Dissanayake who had been a powerful minister of Chandrika Kumarathunga's government.

== See also ==
- Lalith Athulathmudali
