= Ratmalana Electoral District =

Former Sri Lankan electoral district

Ratmalana Electoral District was an electoral district of Sri Lanka between July 1977 and February 1989. The district was named after the town of Ratmalana in Colombo District, Western Province. The 1978 Constitution of Sri Lanka introduced the proportional representation electoral system for electing members of Parliament. The existing 160 mainly single-member electoral districts were replaced with 22 multi-member electoral districts. Ratmalana electoral district was replaced by the Colombo multi-member electoral district at the 1989 general elections, the first under the PR system, though Ratmalana continues to be a polling division of the multi-member electoral district.

== Members of Parliament ==
Key

Independent SLFP UNP

Election	Member	Party	Term
1977	Lalith Athulathmudali	United National Party	1977-1989

== Elections ==
=== 1977 Parliamentary General Election ===
Results of the 8th parliamentary election held on 21 July 1977 for the district:

Candidate	Party	Symbol	Votes	%
Lalith Athulathmudali	United National Party	Elephant	19,972	56.62%
C. V. Gunaratne	Sri Lanka Freedom Party	Hand	12,141	34.42%
Vivienne Goonewardena	Lanka Sama Samaja Party	Key	3,055	8.66%
U.G. Gunadasa Perera		Chair	108	0.31%
Valid Votes			35,276	100.00%
Rejected Votes			110	
Total Polled			35,386	
Registered Electors			43,379	
Turnout			81%	
