= List of Sri Lankan presidential elections =

The President of Sri Lanka is directly elected by voters for a five-year term. Below is a list of presidential elections in Sri Lanka, including the number of votes obtained by each candidate and voter turnout.

== List ==
Election	Winning candidate				Runner-up candidate				Others		Total votes	Turnout
Election	Candidate	Party	Votes	%	Candidate	Party	Votes	%	Votes	%	Total votes	Turnout
1982	J. R. Jayewardene	UNP	3,450,811	52.91%	Hector Kobbekaduwa	SLFP	2,548,438	39.07%	522,898	8.02%	6,522,147	81.06%
1988	Ranasinghe Premadasa	UNP	2,569,199	50.43%	Sirimavo Bandaranaike	SLFP	2,289,860	44.95%	235,719	4.63%	5,094,778	55.32%
1994	Chandrika Kumaratunga	SLFP	4,709,205	62.28%	Srima Dissanayake	UNP	2,715,283	35.91%	137,038	1.81%	7,561,526	70.47%
1999	Chandrika Kumaratunga	SLFP	4,312,157	51.12%	Ranil Wickremesinghe	UNP	3,602,748	42.71%	520,849	6.17%	8,435,754	73.31%
2005	Mahinda Rajapaksa	SLFP	4,887,152	50.29%	Ranil Wickremesinghe	UNP	4,706,366	48.43%	123,521	1.28%	9,717,039	73.73%
2010	Mahinda Rajapaksa	SLFP	6,015,934	57.88%	Sarath Fonseka	NDF	4,173,185	40.14%	204,494	1.97%	10,393,613	74.50%
2015	Maithripala Sirisena	NDF	6,217,162	51.28%	Mahinda Rajapaksa	SLFP	5,768,090	47.58%	138,200	1.14%	12,123,452	81.52%
2019	Gotabaya Rajapaksa	SLPP	6,924,255	52.25%	Sajith Premadasa	NDF	5,564,239	41.99%	764,005	5.76%	13,252,499	83.72%
2024	Anura Kumara Dissanayake	NPP	5,634,915 (Note: All-island votes received in the 1st round of counting without preferences.)	42.30%	Sajith Premadasa	SJB	4,363,035	32.75%	3,321,666	24.95%	13,319,616	79.46%
2024	Anura Kumara Dissanayake	NPP	5,740,179 (Note: Total votes: All-island 5,634,915 + Preferential 105,264)	55.89% (Note: Percentage of the total votes polled (all-island and preferential) by each of the two remaining candidates. All other candidates and their respective first-round vote totals have been eliminated.)	Sajith Premadasa	SJB	4,530,902 (Note: Total votes: All-island 4,363,035 + Preferential 167,035)	44.11%	—		13,319,616	79.46%

== Summary ==
Electoral maps of Sri Lankan presidential elections

2024 Election

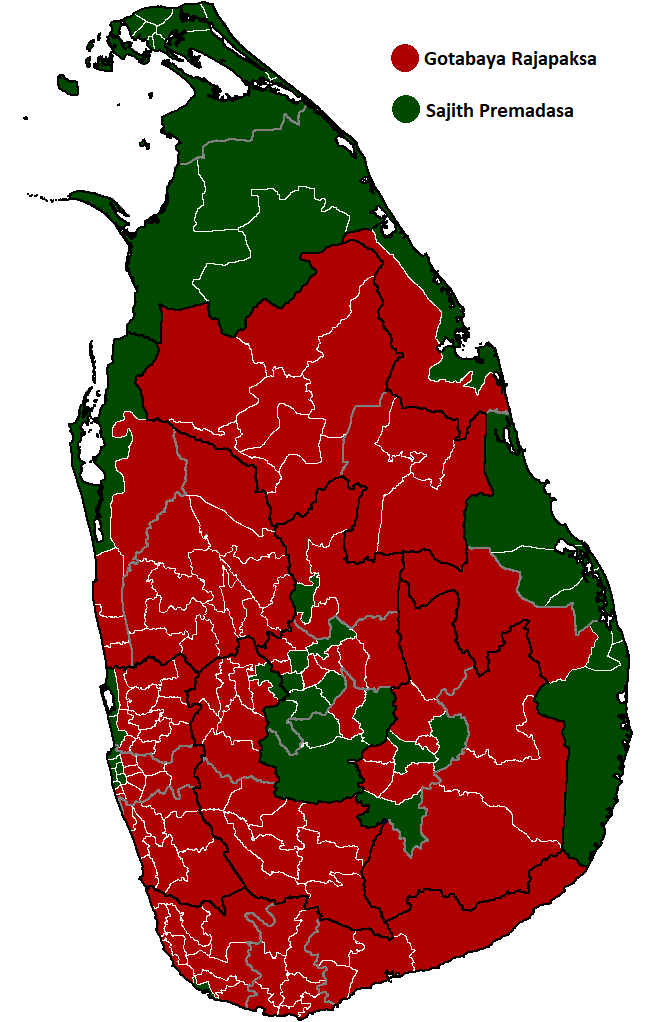
2019 Election

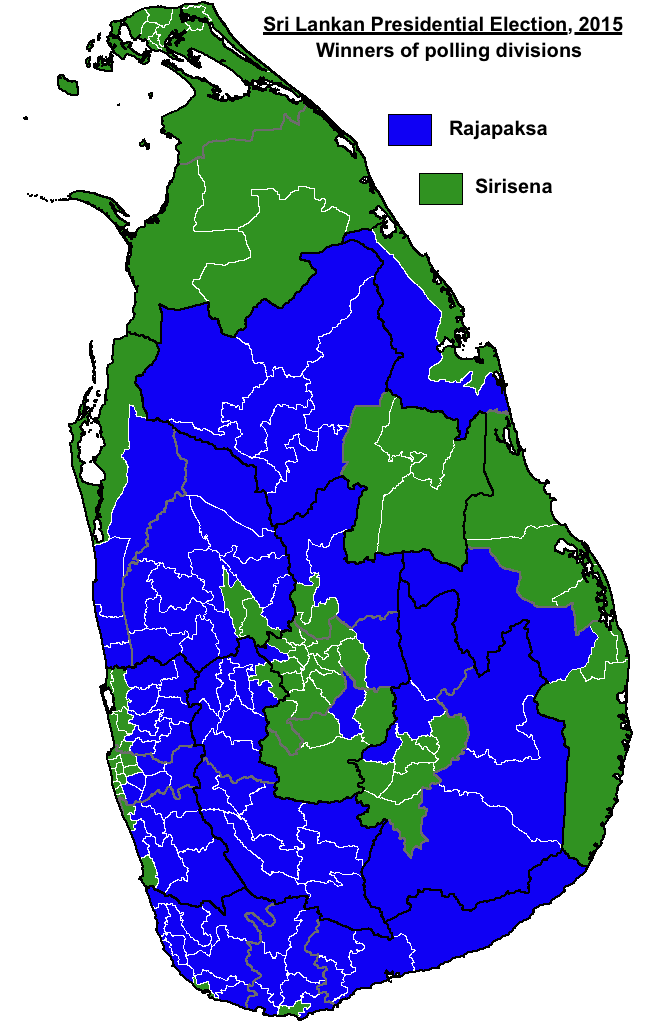
2015 Election

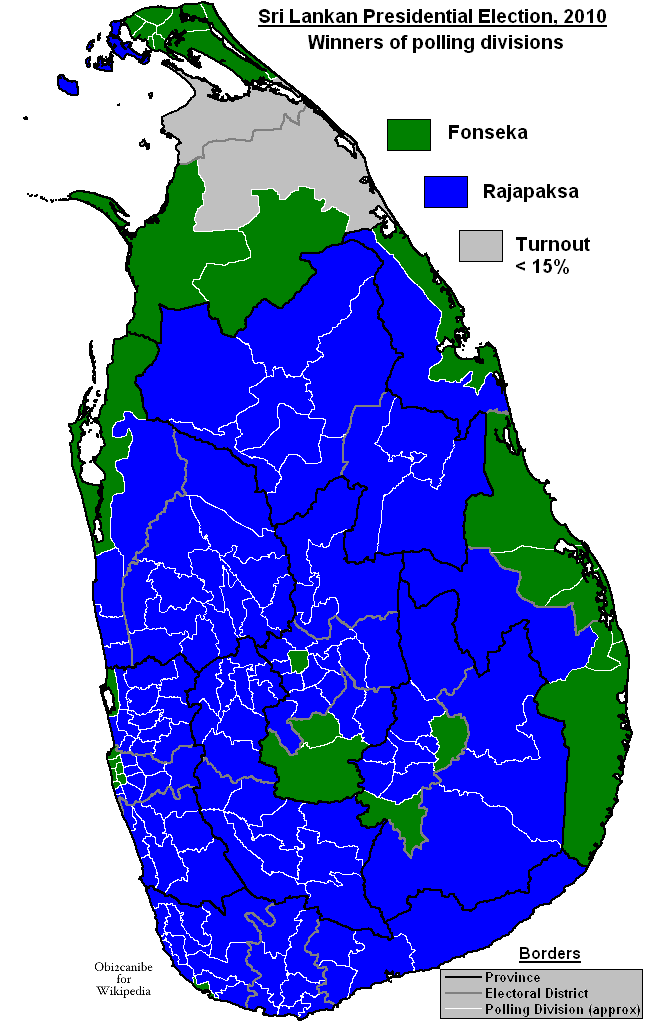
2010 Election

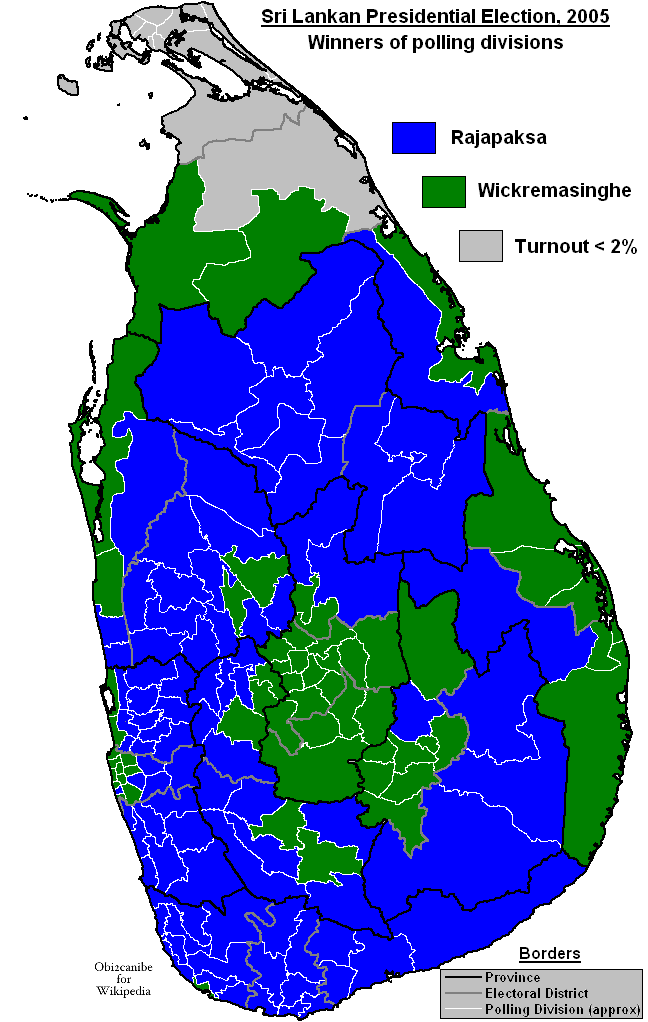
2005 Election

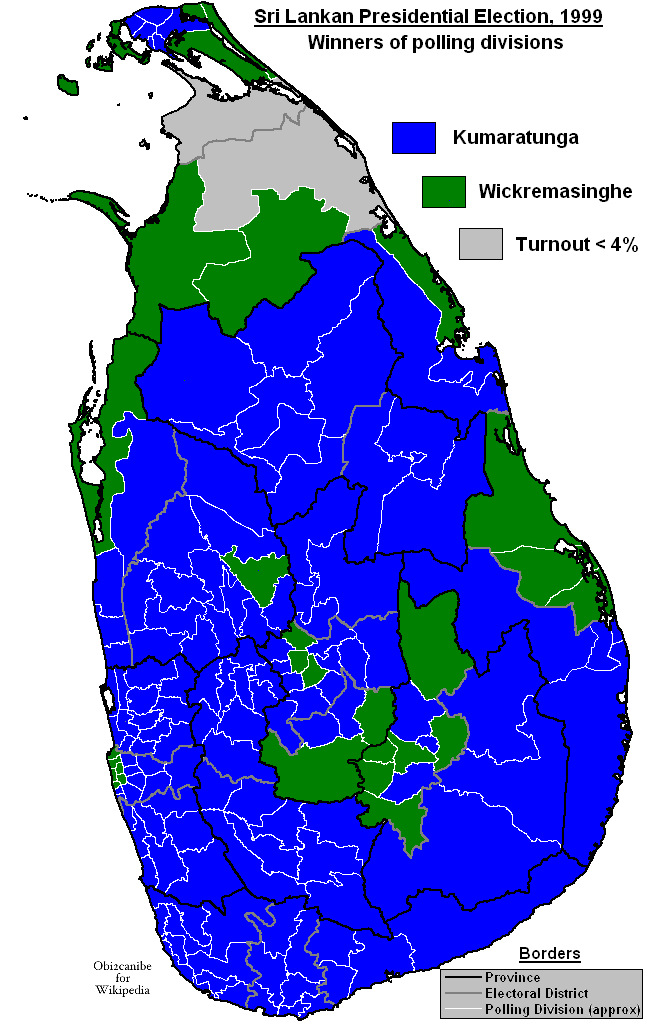
1999 Election

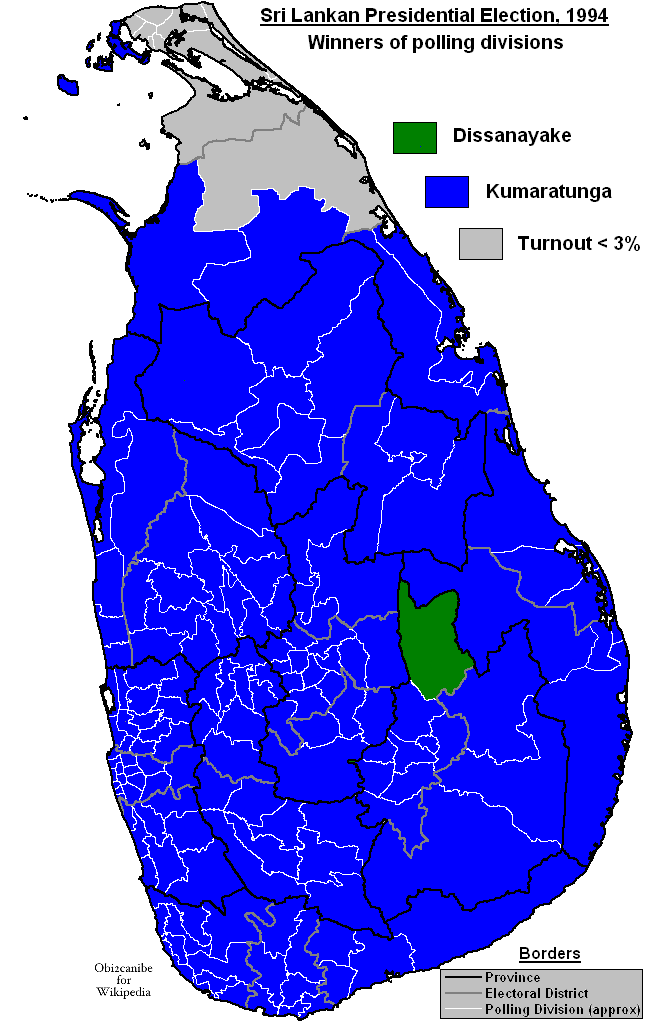
1994 Election

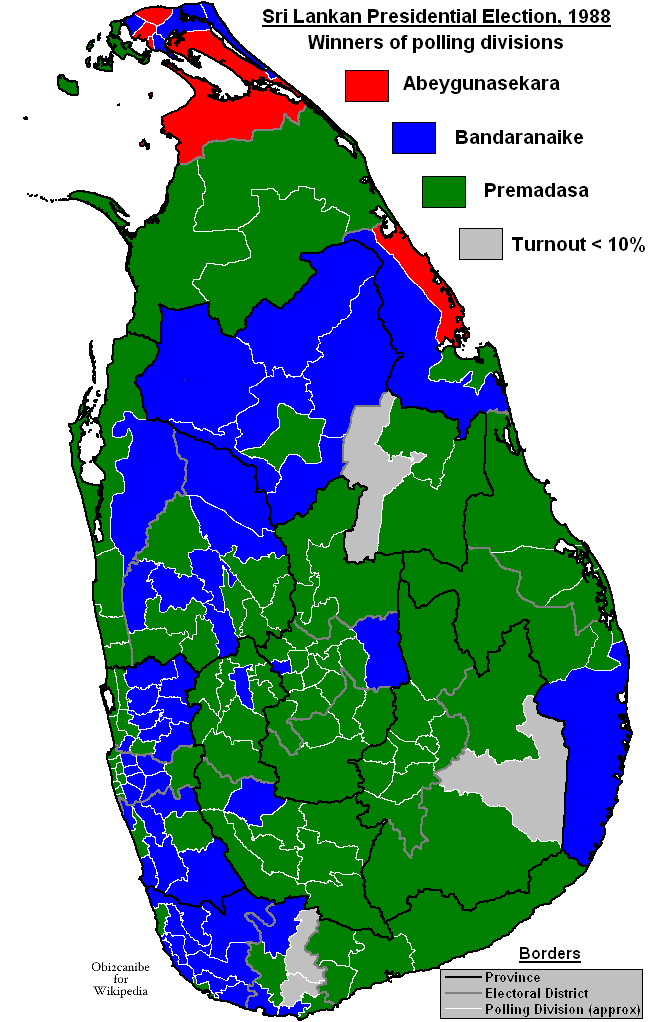
1988 Election

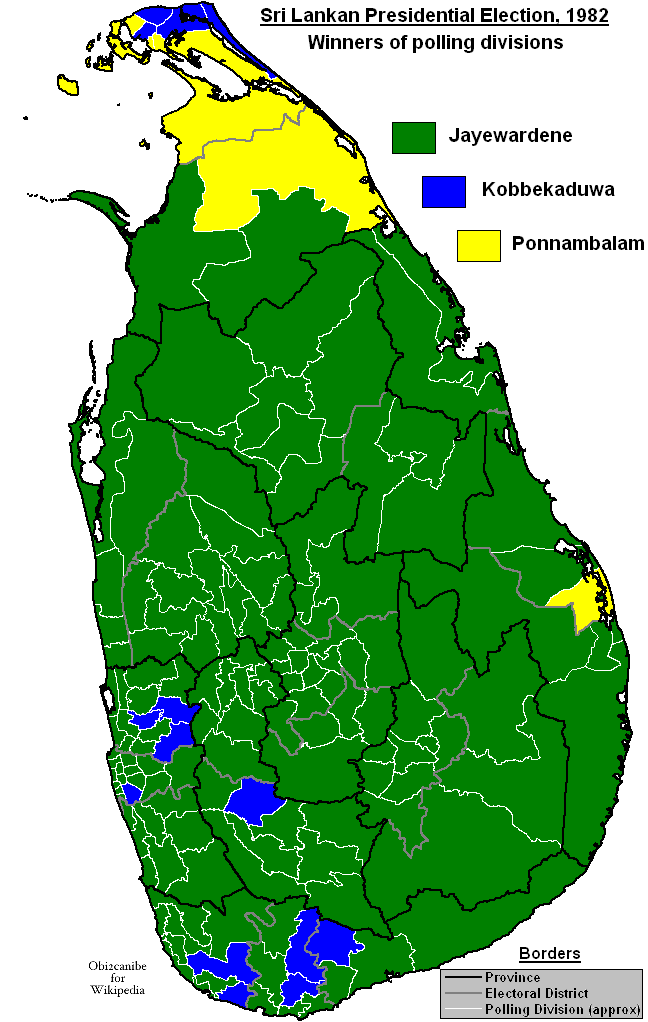
1982 Election

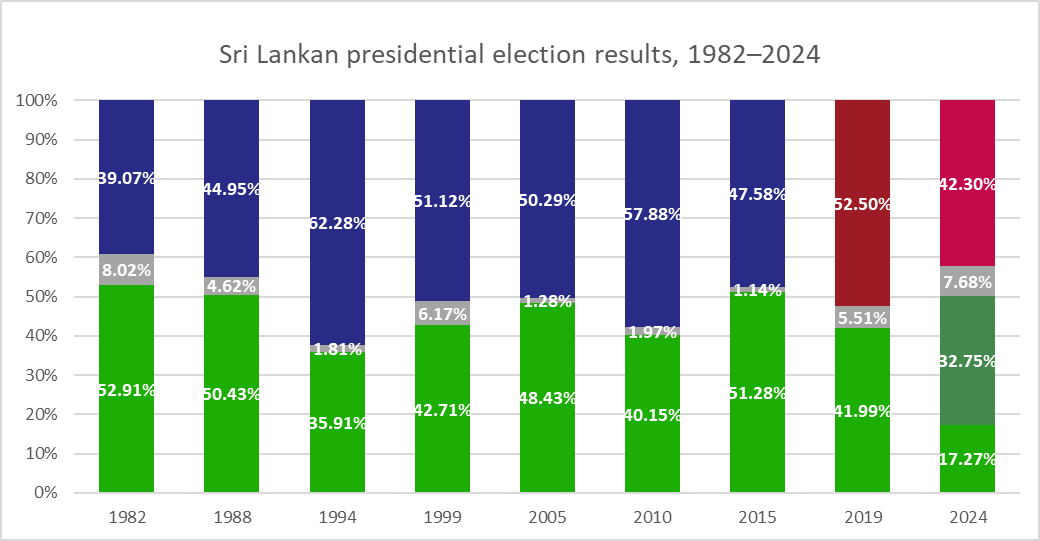
Percentages of votes received by political parties in the direct presidential elections. United National Party/New Democratic Front candidates Sri Lanka Freedom Party candidates Sri Lanka Podujana Peramuna candidates National People's Power candidates Samagi Jana Balawegaya candidates Others

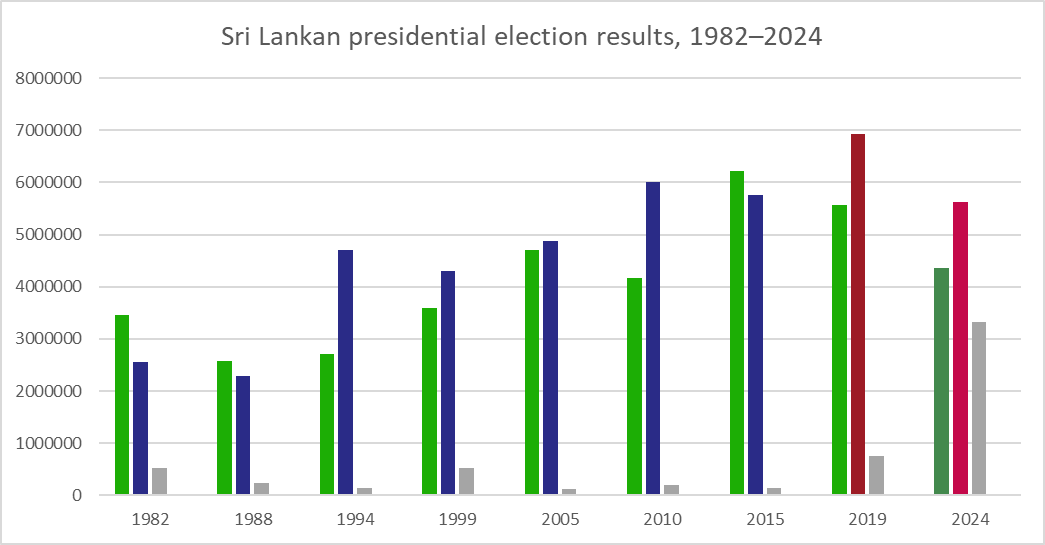
Comparison of popular vote totals received by the top two candidates in the direct presidential elections. United National Party/New Democratic Front candidates Sri Lanka Freedom Party candidates Sri Lanka Podujana Peramuna candidates National People's Power candidates Samagi Jana Balawegaya candidates Others
