= List of female cabinet ministers of Sri Lanka =

denotes the first female minister of that particular department.

Minister	Position	Year Appointed	Administration
Government
Chandrika Kumaratunga	President of Sri Lanka	1994	Herself
Sirimavo Bandaranaike	Prime Minister of Sri Lanka	1960	Oliver Goonetilleke; William Gopallawa
Sirimavo Bandaranaike	Prime Minister of Sri Lanka	1970	William Gopallawa
Chandrika Kumaratunga	Prime Minister of Sri Lanka	1994	Dingiri Banda Wijetunga
Sirimavo Bandaranaike	Prime Minister of Sri Lanka	1994	Chandrika Kumaratunga
Harini Amarasuriya	Prime Minister of Sri Lanka	2024	Anura Kumara Dissanayake
Minister of Buddhasasana and Religious Affairs
Chandrika Kumaratunga	Minister of Buddhist Affairs, Ethnic Relations and National Integration	1994	
Minister of Child Development and Women's Affairs
Sunethra Ranasinghe	Minister of Women's Affairs and Teaching Hospitals	1985	
Renuka Menike Herath	Minister of Health and Women's Affairs	1989	
Chandra Karunaratne	Minister of State of Women's Affairs	1990	
Srimani Athulathmudali	Minister of Transport, Highways, Environment and Women's Affairs	1994	
Sumedha Gunawathie Jayasena	Minister of Women’s Affairs	1999	
Sumedha Gunawathie Jayasena	Minister of Women's Empowerment	2004	
Sumedha Gunawathie Jayasena	Minister of Child's Affairs	2005	
Ferial Ismail Ashraff	Minister of Women’s Affairs	2001	
Harini Amarasuriya	Minister of Women, Child and Youth Affairs and Sports	2024	Anura Kumara Dissanayake
Minister of Defence
Sirimavo Bandaranaike	Minister of Defence	1960	
Chandrika Kumaratunga	Minister of Defence	1994	
Chandrika Kumaratunga	Minister of Defence	2003	
Minister of Education
Renuka Menike Herath	Minister of State of Education	1989	
Sunethra Ranasinghe	Minister of State of Education	1989	
R.M. Pulendran	Minister of State of Education	1990	
Chandrika Kumaratunga	Minister of Constitutional Affairs and Education	2004	
Harini Amarasuriya	Minister of Education, Science and Technology	2024	Anura Kumara Dissanayake
Minister of Environment
Srimani Athulathmudali	Minister of Transport, Highways, Environment and Women's Affairs	1994	
Ministry of Finance and Planning
Sirimavo Bandaranaike	Minister of Finance, Planning and Plan Implementation	1970	
Chandrika Kumaratunga	Minister of Finance and Planning	1994	
Nirupama Deepika Rajapaksa	Minister of Plan Implementation	1999	
Pavithra Devi Wanniarachchi	Minister of Land and Plan Implementation	2000	
Minister of Fisheries
Irene Wimala Kannangara	Minister of Shipping, Aviation and Tourism	1977	
Minister of Foreign Affairs
Sirimavo Bandaranaike	Minister of Foreign Affairs	1960	
Sirimavo Bandaranaike	Minister of Foreign Affairs	1970	
Minister of Health
Vimala Wijewardene	Minister of Health	1956	
Siva Obeysekere	Minister of Health	1976	
Renuka Menike Herath	Minister of Health and Women's Affairs	1982	
Sunethra Ranasinghe	Minister of Health	1983	
Harini Amarasuriya	Minister of Health	2024	Anura Kumara Dissanayake
Minister of Highways and Road Development
Srimani Athulathmudali	Minister of Transport, Highways, Environment and Women's Affairs	1994	
Minister of Housing and Construction Industry
Ferial Ismail Ashraff	Minister of Housing	2004	
Ferial Ismail Ashraff	Minister of Construction Industry	2004	
Minister of Mass Media and Communication
Chandrika Kumaratunga	Minister of Media Affairs, Poverty Relief, Aviation and Tourism	2001	
Chandrika Kumaratunga	Minister of Interior, Information and Media	2003	
Minister of Justice
Harini Amarasuriya	Minister of Justice, Public Administration, Provincial Councils, Local Government and Labour	2024	
Minister of Lands and Land Development
Pavithra Devi Wanniarachchi	Minister of Land and Plan Implementation	2000	
Minister of Livestock and Rural Community Development
Irene Wimala Kannangara	Minister of Rural Development	1978	
Ferial Ismail Ashraff	Minister of Development and Reconstruction of the East and Rural Housing	2000	
Minister of Labour Relations and Productivity Improvement
Sirimavo Bandaranaike	Minister of Employment	1960	
Minister of Local Government and Provincial Councils
Vimala Wijewardene	Minister of Local Government and Housing	1959	
Minister of National Heritage and Cultural Affairs
Pavithra Devi Wanniarachchi	Minister of National Heritage and Cultural Affairs	2010	
Minister of Petroleum Industries
Chandrika Kumaratunga	Minister of Relief, Rehabilitation and Reconciliation, Transport and Petroleum Resources Development	2005	
Minister of Ports and Aviation
Irene Wimala Kannangara	Minister of Shipping, Aviation and Tourism	1977	
Chandrika Kumaratunga	Minister of Media Affairs, Poverty Relief, Aviation and Tourism	2001	
Pavithra Devi Wanniarachchi	Minister of Samurdhi and Poverty Alleviation	2004	
Minister of Post and Telecommunication
Irene Wimala Kannangara	Minister of Shipping, Aviation and Tourism	1977	
Chandrika Kumaratunga	Minister of Media Affairs, Poverty Relief, Aviation and Tourism	2001	
Minister of Public Administration and Home Affairs
P.M. Amara Piyaseeli Ratnayake	Minister of State of Home Affairs	1988	
Chandrika Kumaratunga	Minister of Interior, Information and Media	2003	
Minister of Rehabilitation and Prison Reforms
Chandrika Kumaratunga	Minister of Relief, Rehabilitation and Reconciliation, Transport and Petroleum Resources Development	2005	
Minister of Resources & Enterprise Development
Chandrika Kumaratunga	Minister of Relief, Rehabilitation and Reconciliation, Transport and Petroleum Resources Development	2005	
Minister of Social Services
Amantha Karunaratne	Minister of State of Social Services	1989	
Amantha Karunaratne	Minister of State of Reconstruction and Social Welfare	1990	
Sumedha Gunawathi Jayasena	Minister of Social Services	1999	
Sumedha Gunawathi Jayasena	Minister of Social Welfare	2004	
Minister of Trade
Harini Amarasuriya	Minister of Trade, Commercial, Food Security, Co-operative Development, Industries and Entrepreneur Development	2024	
Minister of Youth Affairs
Pavithra Devi Wanniarachchi	Minister of Youth Affairs	2007	
Minister without Portfolio
Sirimavo Bandaranaike	Minister without Portfolio	1994	

== See also ==
- Cabinet
- Cabinet of Sri Lanka
- Politics of Sri Lanka
