= Government of Sri Lanka =

National government

- Sinhala: ශ්‍රී ලංකා රජය; Tamil: இலங்கை அரசாங்கம்
- Emblem of the Government of Sri Lanka
- Formation: 1978; 48 years ago (under current constitution)
- Founding document: Constitution of Sri Lanka
- Jurisdiction: Sri Lanka
- Website: www.gov.lk

Legislative branch
- Legislature: Parliament
- Meeting place: New Parliament Complex

Executive branch
- Leader: President of Sri Lanka
- Headquarters: Presidential Secretariat
- Main organ: Cabinet

Judicial branch
- Court: Supreme Court of Sri Lanka
- Seat: Colombo and Sri Jayawardenepura Kotte, Colombo District

The Government of Sri Lanka (GoSL) (Sinhala: ශ්‍රී ලංකා රජය, romanised: Śrī Laṅkā Rajaya; Tamil: இலங்கை அரசாங்கம், romanised: Ilaṇkai Aracāṅkam) is a semi-presidential republic determined by the Sri Lankan Constitution. It administers the island from both its commercial capital of Colombo and the administrative capital of Sri Jayawardenepura Kotte.

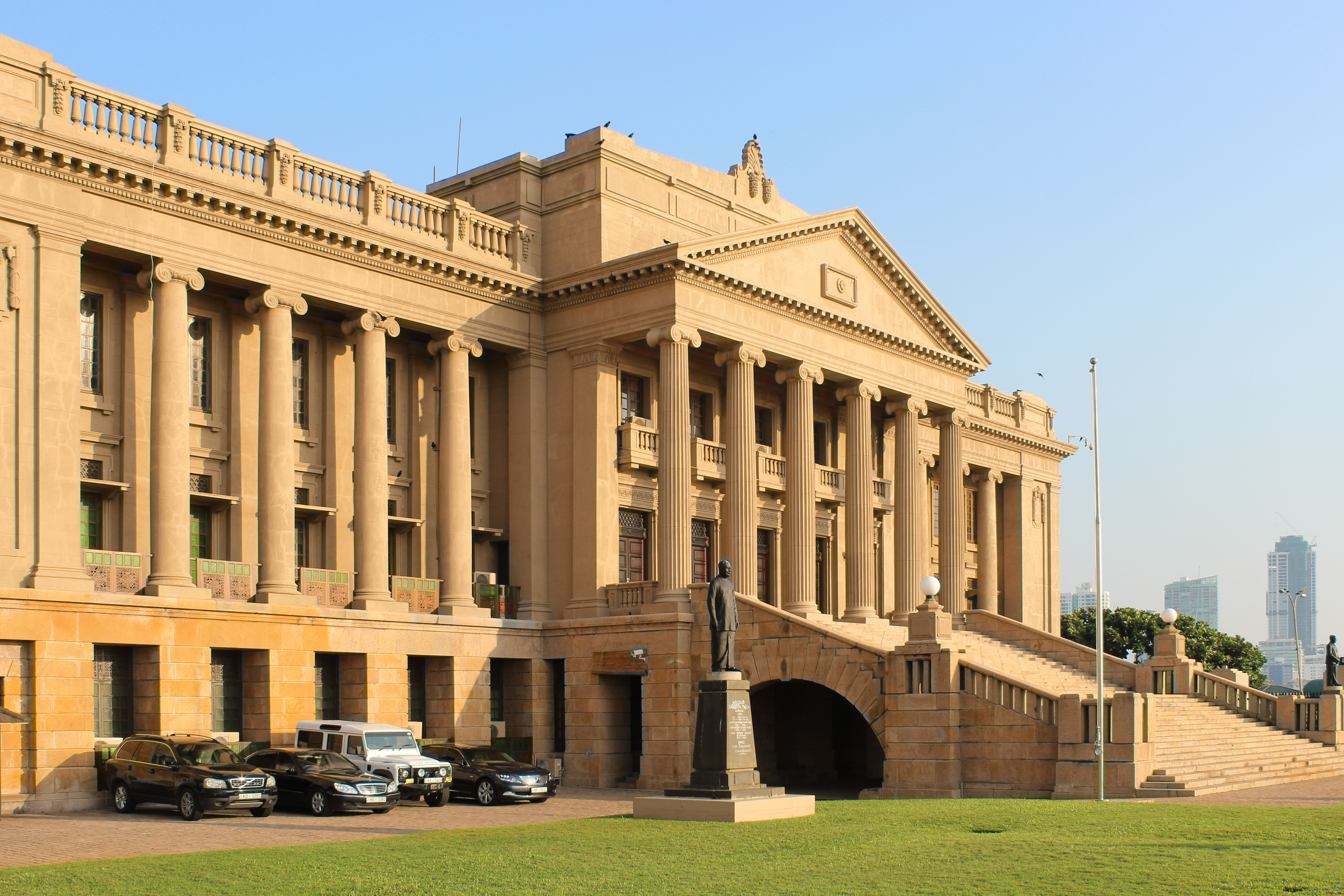
State Secretariat, Colombo 1

== Constitution ==
The Constitution of Sri Lanka has been the constitution of the island nation of Sri Lanka since its original promulgation by the National State Assembly on 7 September 1978. It is Sri Lanka's second republican constitution and its third constitution since the country's independence (as Ceylon) in 1948, after the Donoughmore Constitution, Soulbury Constitution, and Constitution of 1972. As of October 2020, it has been formally amended 21 times.

== Executive branch ==
The President, directly elected for a five-year term, is head of state, head of government, (Note: After the 1978 reforms, the President of Sri Lanka became the head of government instead of the Prime Minister of Sri Lanka.) chief executive, and commander-in-chief of the armed forces. The election occurs under the Sri Lankan form of the contingent vote. Responsible to Parliament for the exercise of duties under the constitution and laws, the president may be removed from office by a two-thirds vote of Parliament with the concurrence of the Supreme Court.

The President appoints and heads a cabinet of ministers responsible to Parliament. The president's deputy is the Prime Minister of Sri Lanka, who leads the ruling party in Parliament. The President can dissolve the cabinet and appoint a new one at any time.

Main office holders
| Office | Name | Party | Since |
|---|---|---|---|
| President | Anura Kumara Dissanayake | National People's Power | 23 September 2024 |
| Prime Minister | Harini Amarasuriya | National People's Power | 24 September 2024 |

== Legislative branch ==
The Parliament has 225 members, elected for a six-year term, 196 members elected in multi-seat constituencies and 29 by proportional representation. The President may summon, suspend, or end a legislative session and dissolve Parliament any time after it has served for one year. Parliament reserves the power to make all laws.

The primary modification is that the party that receives the largest number of valid votes in each constituency gains a unique "bonus seat" (see Hickman, 1999). Since its independence in 1948, Sri Lanka has remained a member of the Commonwealth of Nations.

== Judicial branch ==
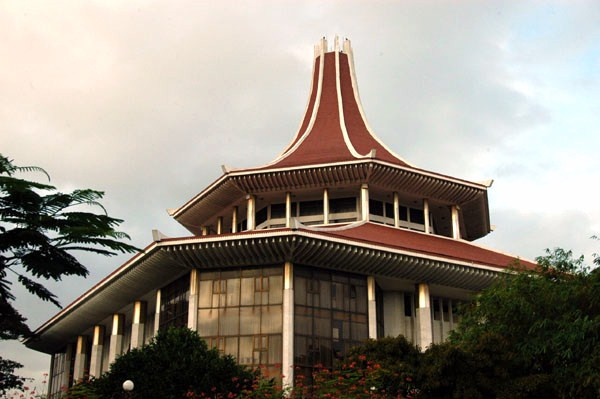
Supreme Court Complex, Hultsdorf

The judiciary is the system of courts that interprets and applies the law in the country. It is set out in the constitution, which defines courts as independent institutions within the traditional framework of checks and balances. The Sri Lankan courts are presided over by professional judges, judges of the Supreme Court are appointed by the President with the nomination of the Parliamentary Council, others by the Judicial Service Commission.

Sri Lanka has a legal system which is an amalgam of English common law, Roman-Dutch civil law and Customary Law.

== Elections ==
Sri Lanka elects on the national level a head of state - the president - and a legislature. The president is elected for a five-year term by the people. The Parliament has 225 members, elected for a five-year term, and 196 members elected in multi-seat constituencies through a proportional representation system where each party is allocated a number of seats from the quota for each district according to the proportion of the total vote that the party obtains in the district.

== List of Governments in Sri Lanka ==
- 1st - United National Party - from 1947 to 1952
- 2nd - United National Party - from 1952 to 1956
- 3rd - Sri Lanka Freedom Party - from 1956 to 1959
- 4th - United National Party - 1960
- 5th - Sri Lanka Freedom Party - from 1960 to 1965
- 6th - United National Party - from 1965 to 1970
- 7th - Sri Lanka Freedom Party - from 1970 to 1977
- 8th - United National Party - from 1977 to 1989
- 9th - United National Party - from 1989 to 1994
- 10th - People's Alliance - from 1994 to 2001
- 11th - United National Front - from 2001 to 2004
- 12th - United People's Alliance - from 2004 to 2010
- 13th - United People's Alliance - from 2010 to 2015
- 14th - New Democratic Front - from 2015 to 2019
- 15th - Sri Lankan People's Freedom Alliance - from 2019 to 2022
- 16th - New Democratic Front - from 2022 to 2024
- 17th - National People's Power - from 2024 to now
