= Provincial minister (Sri Lanka) =

Political office in Sri Lanka

In Sri Lanka, a Provincial Minister (Sinhala: පළාත් ඇමති,Tamil: மாகாண அமைச்சர்) is politician, who is a Member of the Board of Ministers of a province.

== Appointment ==
Under the article 154F of the Sri Lankan Constitution, the Governor of the province on the advice of the Chief Minister can appoint a Member of Provincial Council as a Member of the Board of Ministers of the province.

== Powers and duties ==
The Board of Ministers would aid and advise the Governor of the Province in the exercise of his functions, which will not be inquired into in any Court. The Board of Ministers shall be collectively responsible and answerable to the Provincial Council.

== Privileges of office ==
=== Salary ===
As per the Provincial Councils (Payment of Salaries and Allowances) Act, No. 37 of 1988, a Member of the Board of Ministers of a Province is entitled to monthly salary and allowances equal of the deputy minister. In addition, since all provincial ministers are members of the provincial council they are entitled to allowances and benefits of provincial councilor.

=== Travel ===
Each provincial minister is entitled to two vehicles, which includes an official vehicle and security vehicle provided and maintained by their provincial council.

=== Security ===
Traditionally security for provincial ministers have been provided by the local police.

=== Order of precedence ===
In the Sri Lankan order of precedence, provincial ministers are placed after the Members of Parliament, but before the Secretary to the President.
