= Democratic United National Front =

Political party in Sri Lanka

Democratic United National Front ප්‍රජාතන්ත්‍රවාදී එක්සත් ජාතික පෙරමුණ ஜனநாயக ஐக்கிய தேசிய முன்னணி
- Abbreviation: DUNF
- Leader: Ariyawansa Dissanayake
- Secretary: Ariyawansa Dissanayake
- Founded: 1992
- Split from: United National Party
- Headquarters: 47 A First Lane, Rawathawatta, Moratuwa
- Beruwala Pradeshiya Sabha: 1 / 42
- Attanagalla Pradeshiya Sabha: 1 / 54
- Kotikawatta-Mulleriyawa Pradeshiya Sabha: 1 / 36

Election symbol
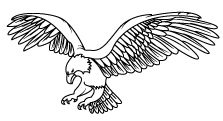
- Eagle

Website
- dunf.lk/index.html

The Democratic United National Front (DUNF; Sinhala: ප්‍රජාතන්ත්‍රවාදී එක්සත් ජාතික පෙරමුණ, romanized: Prajathanthrvadi Eksath Jathika Peramuna, Tamil: ஜனநாயக ஐக்கிய தேசிய முன்னணி) is a political party in Sri Lanka. It was founded as a breakaway faction of the United National Party (UNP), following the attempted impeachment of Ranasinghe Premadasa by several members of the UNP, led by Lalith Athulathmudali. The impeachment was unsuccessful, resulting in the expulsion of Athulathmudali and Gamini Dissanayake from the UNP due to their involvement.

On 23 April 1993, Lalith Athulathmudali was assassinated during an election campaign rally.

== Electoral history ==
=== Provincial ===
Election year	Votes	Vote %	Councillors	Councils	+/–
1993	928,391	14.54%	53 / 380	0 / 7	▲53
