= Srimani Athulathmudali =

Sri Lankan politician

Member of Parliament for Colombo District
- In office 19 August 1994 – 18 August 2000
- Majority: 148,727 Preferential Votes

Minister of Environment and Women Affairs
- In office 25 August 1994 – 18 August 2000
- President: D.B. Wijetunga

Personal details
- Born: Srimani Anoma de Seram; April 27, 1946 Colombo, Sri Lanka
- Died: December 1, 2004 (aged 58) Colombo, Sri Lanka
- Party: Democratic United National Front
- Other political affiliations: People's Alliance
- Spouse: Lalith Athulathmudali (1982–1993)
- Children: 1
- Occupation: Politician

Srimani Anoma Athulathmudali MP (née de Seram; 27 April 1946 – 1 December 2004) (Sinhala: ශ්‍රීමණි අනෝමා අතුලමුදලි) was a Sri Lankan politician and a former government minister who held the position of minister of Environment, Transport and Women's Affairs under the Wijetunga cabinet appointed by the former Sri Lankan president, D.B. Wijetunga. She died of cancer in 2004.

== Political career ==
Srimani Athulathmudali entered into politics after Lalith Athulathmudali was assassinated in the runup to provincial council elections in 1993. Srimani launched a new political party, Democratic United National Lalith Front which divided from the Democratic United National Front (DUNF) following the assassination of her husband, Lalith Athulathmudali on the 23rd of April, 1993 during an election campaign rally. She contested for the Colombo District at the August 1994 parliamentary elections and was appointed as the minister of Environment and Women's Affairs. She served as the Member of Parliament of the 10th Parliament of Sri Lanka from 25 August 1994 to 18 August 2000. She retired from politics in 2000 after losing the elections in 2000 General Elections.

== Personal life ==
She married politician Lalith Athulathmudali in 1982. They had a daughter. Lalith met Srimani in 1978 when Srimani was attached to UNCTAD as a part of the United Nations in Switzerland. Lalith Athulathmudali founded a political party called, Democratic United National Front after exiting from the United National Party.

She established the Lalith Athulathmudali Foundation in 1993, a few months after the death of her husband.

== Death ==
Srimanee Athulathmudali died of cancer on 1 December 2004. She was 58 years old.
