= Parliamentary secretary =

Westminster-system cabinet position for parliamentary duties

A parliamentary secretary is a member of parliament in the Westminster system who assists a more senior minister with their duties. In several countries, the position has been re-designated as assistant minister, junior minister or associate minister.

In the parliamentary systems of several Commonwealth countries, such as the United Kingdom, Canada, Australia, India and Singapore, it is customary for the prime minister to appoint parliamentary secretaries from their political party in parliament to assist cabinet ministers with their work. The role of parliamentary secretaries varies under different prime ministers. The post has often served as a training ground for future ministers.

== In the Commonwealth ==
=== Australia ===
In Australia, parliamentary secretaries are appointed in the federal government and most state governments. At the federal level, the Australian constitution provides only for the appointment of "ministers of state". Parliamentary secretaries are formally ministers of state, however they are not responsible for any portfolios and act under the direction of a more senior minister. Since 2015, "parliamentary secretaries" have been titled as "assistant ministers". However, they remain formally "parliamentary secretaries" under the Ministers of State Act 1952. An assistant minister's title may not necessarily correspond to their official position, with Matt Thistlethwaite in 2022 titled the Assistant Minister for the Republic while he also held the offices of Parliamentary Secretary to the Attorney-General, Minister for Defence and Minister for Veterans Affairs. The prime minister is permitted to appoint a member from either house of Parliament to be a parliamentary secretary to a minister. As they are ministers of state for constitutional purposes, parliamentary secretaries may be paid a salary.

According to Prime Minister Paul Keating in 1993, "the institution of Parliamentary Secretary provides a very inexpensive means not only of giving talented individuals executive experience but providing Ministers with needed support."

In the state of Queensland, parliamentary secretaries were re-designated as 'assistant ministers' following the 2012 Queensland election.

=== Canada ===
During Jean Chrétien's term as Prime Minister of Canada, parliamentary secretaries were set to two-year terms and the post was used as a reward for weary backbenchers. Their duty was to answer questions and table reports on behalf of ministers when they were unable to be present in the house.

Chrétien's successor as Canadian prime minister, Paul Martin, when sworn in in 2003, promised a new role for parliamentary secretaries. They would now be sworn into the privy council, giving them access to some secret documents, and allowing them to attend Canadian Cabinet meetings and be assigned specific files by ministers. This replaced the positions of secretaries of state which had been employed under Chrétien.

=== India ===
In 2018, 20 MLAs in Delhi were held to be disqualified from Delhi Legislative Assembly because they were Parliamentary Secretaries and therefore held office of profit as defined in the Representation of the People Act, 1951.

=== Mauritius ===
Since the 1968 Independence the constitution of Mauritius allowed for 14 ministers and 5 parliamentary secretaries. Initially the role of a parliamentary secretary was to assist ministers. The number of such positions rose steadily but their roles have progressively changed. After the 1987 elections the candidates who had missed out on ministerial positions were nominated as parliamentary secretaries.

=== New Zealand ===
The position titled Parliamentary Under-Secretary is established by the Constitution Act 1986. Unlike ministers in the New Zealand Government, parliamentary under-secretaries are not members of the Executive Council.

New Zealand also has Parliamentary Private Secretaries.

=== Sri Lanka ===
1972 (Ceylon Dutch 1658–1796) / Britain 1796 (annexed) (ceded by the Dutch 1815–1948) / Ceylon 1948–1972 British Commonwealth of Nations

Under the Soulbury Constitution, junior members of parliament were appointed to serve as parliamentary secretaries. Each cabinet minister would have one parliamentary secretary. In 1972, the republican constitution replace the position of parliamentary secretary with that of deputy minister. With the parliamentary secretary for external affairs and defence serving as the de facto parliamentary secretary to the prime minister of Ceylon.

=== United Kingdom ===
In the United Kingdom, parliamentary secretary (in full, usually Parliamentary Under-Secretary of State in those departments headed by a secretary of state) is the third level of government minister, below minister of state and secretary of state (or another minister of secretary of state rank, such as the chancellor of the exchequer). Not all departments have all three levels of minister.

A parliamentary private secretary (PPS), on the other hand, is a member of parliament who acts as an unpaid assistant to an individual minister, but has no ministerial role, although is expected to support the government at all times.

== Outside the Commonwealth ==
=== Germany ===
A parliamentary state secretary (Parlamentarischer Staatssekretär, PStS) is a member of the Bundestag given a portfolio to assist a minister with running a government ministry. The position is roughly analogous to deputy ministers.

In 2021, there are 36 parliamentary state secretaries in the Merkel IV Cabinet. The position was first introduced in 1967 to help younger politicians gain experience for future ministerial roles.

=== Ireland ===
In the Irish Free State, the Ministers and Secretaries Act, 1924 created the post of parliamentary secretary (Irish: rúnaí parlaiminte), originally limited to seven holders. In 1978, the office was superseded in Ireland by the office of Minister of State.

== See also ==
- Parliamentary assistant
- Permanent secretary
- Private secretary
- Undersecretary
