= Impeach (motion) =

- Class: Incidental main
- Requires second?: Yes
- Debatable?: Yes
- May be reconsidered?: A decision or finding favorable to accused may not be reconsidered, but an unfavorable decision can be reconsidered.
- Amendable?: Yes

The motion to impeach is used to bring an accusation against a person. A majority vote is needed to put the accused on trial. A majority vote convicts for a minor offense, and a two-thirds vote for a major offense. A vote of censure or reprimand requires majority vote, and suspension or expulsion a two-thirds vote.

Robert's Rules of Order does not have a motion to impeach. However, this book requires a fair disciplinary process which includes appointing a committee to conduct a confidential investigation, report of the committee and preferral of charges if warranted, formal notification of the accused, and trial; and a two-thirds vote is required to expel.

== See also ==
- Impeachment
