= Kirulapone =

Kirulapone කිරිල්ලපනේ கிருலப்பனை
- Suburb
- Location in Colombo District
- Coordinates: 6°52′31″N 79°52′31″E
- Country: Sri Lanka
- Province: Western Province
- District: Colombo District

Population (2024)
  - Total: 16,245
- Time zone: UTC+5:30 (Sri Lanka Standard Time Zone)
- Postal Code: 0600

Kirulapone, also known as Kirulapana, is a neighbourhood in Colombo, Sri Lanka. It is part of the Colombo 5 postal district, and is located approximately 6 km (3.7 mi) south of the Colombo central business district.

== Places of Interest ==
- Best Western Elyon Colombo Hotel
- Calvary Church
- Ministry of Finance and Mass Media
- Poorvaramaya Buddhist Temple

== Schools ==
- Lumbini College
- Isipathana College
- Mahamathya Maha Vidyalaya (formally Bhadrawathie Vidyalaya)
- Lanka Shaba College
- Asian International School
- Ilma International Girls' School
- Royal Institute Girls' School
- Logos College

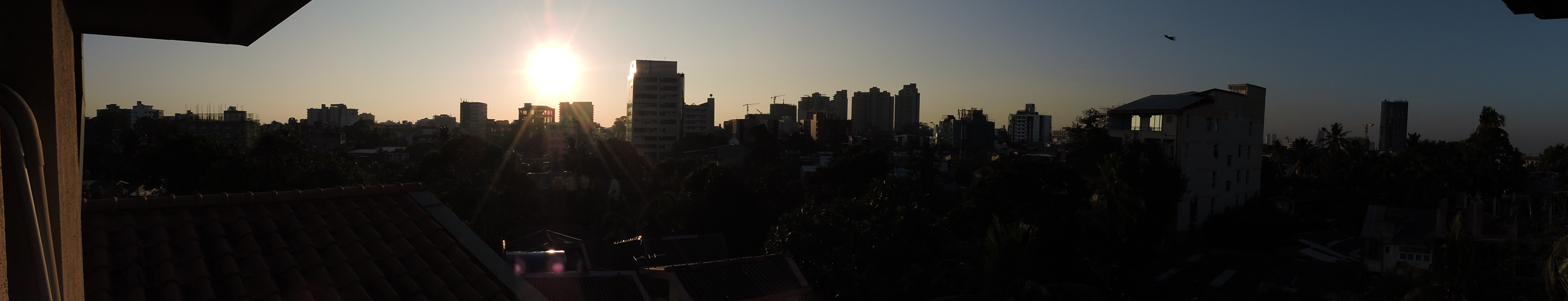
Panoramic view from Kirulapone.

== Transport ==
=== Railway ===
- Kirulapone Railway Station, a commuter rail stop, opened on 13 March 1877.

=== Road ===
- A4 Road runs through Kirulapana while Elvitigala Mawatha (Narahenpita Road), which leads to the Katunayake Airport (CMB) begins from here.

=== Waterway ===
- Kirulapone canal, a branch of the Diyawanna Oya.
