= Deputy minister (Sri Lanka) =

In Sri Lanka, a Deputy Minister (Sinhala: නියෝජ්‍ය අමාත්‍ය,Tamil: துணை மந்திரி) is a politician a in a government Ministry. A deputy minister serves as a deputy to a Cabinet Minister and is ranked below a State Minister.

== Appointment ==
Under the article 45 of the Sri Lankan Constitution, the President on the advice of the Prime Minister can appoint a Member of Parliament as a Deputy Minister to assist a Minister of the Cabinet of Ministers to carryout their duties. The post was created under the Sri Lankan Constitution of 1972 replacing the former post of Parliamentary Secretary.

== Powers and duties ==
A Cabinet Minister by publishing in the Gazette can delegate to his/her deputy minister any power or duty coming under the subject or function assigned to the cabinet minister by law.

== Privileges of office ==
=== Salary ===
A deputy minister would receive a salary of Rs. 135,000 (having been increased from 63,500 from January 2018); paid monthly from the respective ministry budget. In addition, since all deputy ministers are members of parliament they are entitled to allowances and benefits of parliamentarians.

=== Official residence and office ===
Deputy ministers may not be formally entitled to an official residence, they have an office and personal staff allocated from their ministry.

=== Travel ===
Each deputy minister is entitled to two vehicles, which includes an official vehicle and security vehicle, provided and maintained by their ministry. For domestic air travel, helicopters from the No. 4 (VVIP/VIP) Helicopter Squadron of the Sri Lanka Air Force are charted by the ministry.

=== Security ===
Traditionally security for the ministers have been provided by the Sri Lanka Police since the 1987–1989 JVP insurrection. During emergencies military units have been allocated to bolster security to certain ministers based on treat levels. At present the Ministerial Security Division is in charge of security of ministers.

=== Order of precedence ===
In the Sri Lankan order of precedence, deputy ministers are placed after the Deputy Speaker of the Parliament, but before the Chief Government Whip (if the whip does not hold a ministerial position).
