= 2020 in Sri Lanka =

- Decades: 2000s; 2010s; 2020s
- See also: Other events of 2020; Timeline of Sri Lankan history

This page lists notable events that took place during the year 2020 in Sri Lanka.

== Incumbents ==
=== National ===
| President | Prime Minister | Speaker | Chief Justice | Opposition Leader |
| Gotabaya Rajapaksa (Age 71) | Mahinda Rajapaksa (Age 75) | Mahinda Yapa Abeywardena (Age 75) | Jayantha Jayasuriya | Sajith Premadasa (Age 53) |
|---|---|---|---|---|
| Sri Lanka Podujana Peramuna (since 18 November 2019) | Sri Lanka Podujana Peramuna (since 21 November 2019) | Sri Lanka Podujana Peramuna (from 20 August 2020) | Independent (since 29 April 2019) | Samagi Jana Balawegaya (from 3 January 2020) |

Former

Speaker
Karu Jayasuriya
(Age 80)
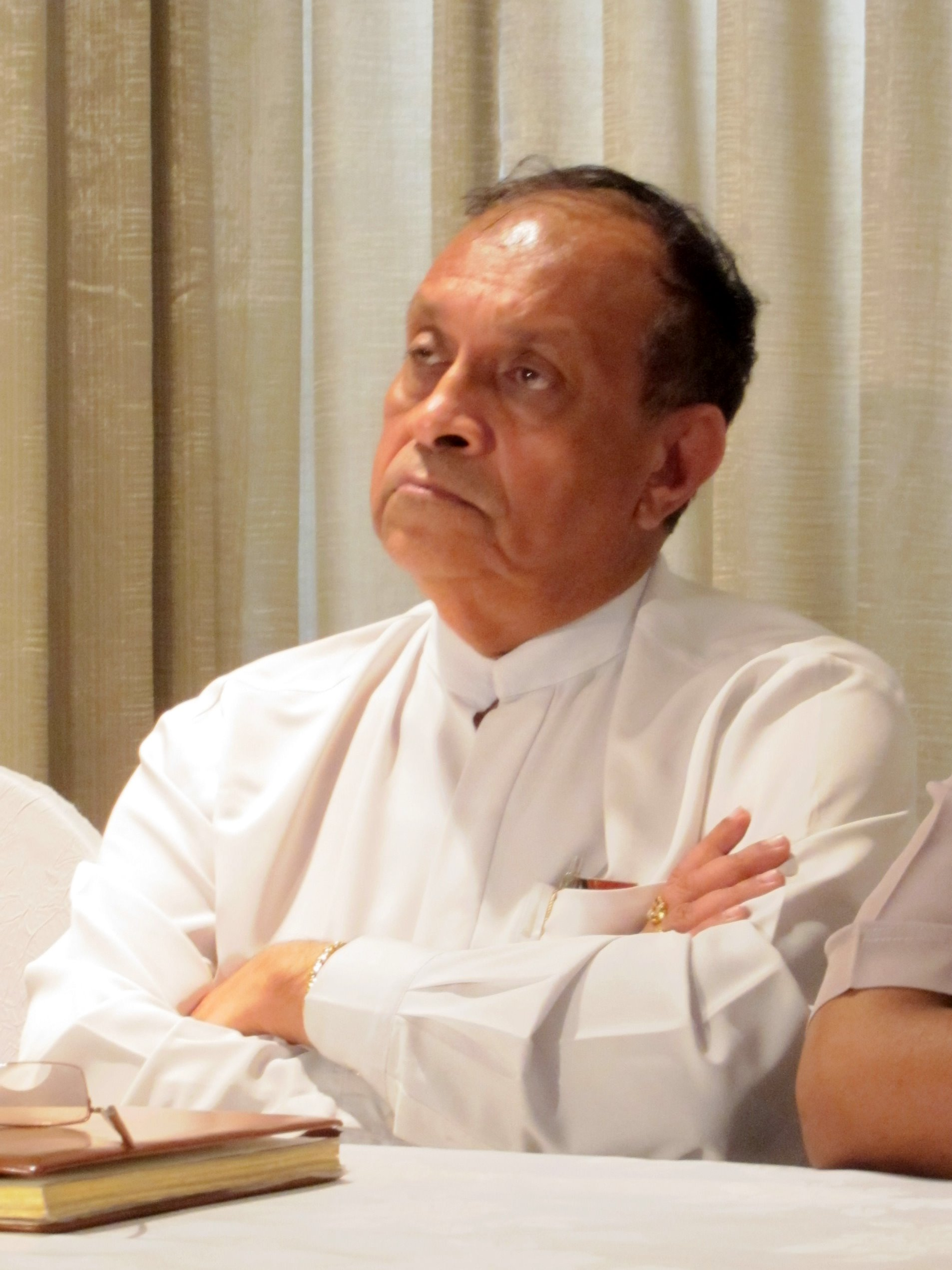
United National Party
(1 September 2015 – 3 March 2020)

=== Provincial ===
Governors

- Central Province – Lalith U Gamage
- Eastern Province – Anuradha Yahampath
- North Central Province – Tissa Vitharana
- Northern Province – P. S. M. Charles
- North Western Province – A. J. M. Muzammil
- Sabaragamuwa Province – Tikiri Kobbekaduwa
- Southern Province – Willy Gamage
- Uva Province – Raja Collure
- Western Province – Seetha Arambepola

Chief Ministers

- Central Province – Sarath Ekanayake
- Eastern Province – Ahamed Nazeer Zainulabdeen
- North Central Province – Peshala Jayarathne
- Northern Province – C. V. Vigneswaran
- North Western Province – Dharmasiri Dassanayake
- Sabaragamuwa Province – Maheepala Herath
- Southern Province – Shan Wijayalal De Silva
- Uva Province – Chamara Sampath Dassanayake
- Western Province – Isura Devapriya

== Events ==
- COVID-19 pandemic in Sri Lanka
- 2019–present Sri Lankan economic crisis

== Events by month ==
=== January ===
- 3 January − A Harbin Y-12 light transport aircraft crashes near Haputale. All four people on board, which were members of the Sri Lanka Air Force, are killed.
- 25 January − The first reported case of COVID-19 in Sri Lanka was identified and the victim was reported to be a Chinese woman.
- 26 January − 2020 Ditrău xenophobic incident: A xenophobic incident occurs in Ditrău, Romania. It involves two Sri Lankan immigrant workers and the local Hungarian population.

=== February ===
- 14 February − The United States issues a travel ban against General Shavendra Silva and his family for human rights violations.
- 19 February − Prime Minister Mahinda Rajapaksa announces that Sri Lanka would withdraw its co-sponsorship of a United Nations Human Rights Council resolution calling for an investigation into alleged war crimes during the final stages of the Sri Lankan Civil War.
- 23 February − The final stage of the Southern Expressway linking to Hambantota is opened to the public.

=== March ===
- 10 March − The first local Sri Lankan national tests positive for COVID-19.
- 12 March − All schools in Sri Lanka are closed until 20 April due to the COVID-19 pandemic.
- 16 March − The Sri Lankan government declares a national public holiday to contain the spread of the coronavirus in the country.
- 24 March − Sri Lanka records 100 COVID-19 patients.
- 27 March − The first Sri Lankan national dies from COVID-19, a man who lived in Switzerland.
- 28 March − The first death from COVID-19 in Sri Lanka is reported.

=== April ===
- 11 April − Sri Lanka records 200 COVID-19 patients.
- 20 April − Sri Lanka records 300 COVID-19 patients.
- 24 April − Sri Lanka records 400 COVID-19 patients.
- 26 April − Sri Lanka records 500 COVID-19 patients.
- 29 April − Sri Lanka records 600 COVID-19 patients.

=== May ===
- 2 May − Sri Lanka records 700 COVID-19 patients.
- 7 May − Sri Lanka records 800 COVID-19 patients.
- 11 May − State and government businesses begin work under government rules and health restrictions.
- 13 May − Sri Lanka records 900 COVID-19 patients.
- 19 May − Sri Lanka records 1000 COVID-19 patients.
- 21 May − 2020 Maligawatta stampede: A stampede occurs near a Muslim Jumma residence in Maligawatta, Colombo, resulting in the death of 3 women and leaving further nine injured.
- 24 May − Sri Lanka records 1100 COVID-19 patients.
- 26 May − Sri Lanka records 1300 COVID-19 patients with a record of 137 new cases in a day.
- 27 May − Sri Lanka records 1500+ COVID-19 patients with a record of 150 new cases in a day.
- 30 May − Sri Lanka records 1600 COVID-19 patients.
- 31 May − 2019–2022 locust infestation: An infestation of yellow-spotted locusts is reported in multiple farmlands across Mawathagama, Kurunegala.

=== June ===
- 3 June − Sri Lanka records 1700+ COVID-19 patients.
- 5 June − Sri Lanka reaches 1800 COVID-19 patients.
- 9 June − Former cabinet minister Mangala Samaraweera resigns from active politics and opts out from contesting for the upcoming general elections.
- 11 June − An accident takes place at the Thummulla Junction, killing an officer attached to the State Intelligence Services by Tharinda Ratwatte, the driver of the Defender SUV.
- 13 June − Archaeologists discover that early humans living in Sri Lanka some 48,000 years ago crafted tools from animal bones and used them to hunt animals, especially monkeys and squirrels. These are the oldest known instances of the use of the bow and arrow technology outside of Africa to date.
- 15 June
  - National parks and zoological gardens throughout the country are reopened with a visitor limit in line with government health regulations.
  - Sri Lanka reaches 1900 COVID-19 patients.
- 16 June − Fugitive and former Governor of the Central Bank of Sri Lanka Lakshman Arjuna Mahendran changes his name to Harjan Alexander.
- 19 June − Sri Lanka's first underwater museum is declared open in Galle.
- 24 June − Sri Lanka reaches 2000 COVID-19 patients.
- 25 June
  - Kasturi Chellaraja Wilson is appointed as the Group CEO of Hemas Holdings, thus making her the first ever Sri Lankan woman to become the CEO of a public conglomerate in Sri Lanka.
  - Former sports minister Mahindananda Aluthgamage states that the 2011 ICC Cricket World Cup final between India and Sri Lanka was fixed by some parties.
- 27 June − All cinema halls in Sri Lanka are reopened.
- 28 June − Former Sri Lankan cricketer Muttiah Muralitharan is named as the Most Valuable Test Player of the 21st Century by the Wisden Cricket Monthly magazine.
- 29 June − All government schools in Sri Lanka are reopened for principals, teachers and other staff after 105 days.
- 30 June − Former national selection committee chairman and cricketer Aravinda de Silva is questioned by the Sri Lankan police due to Mahindananda Aluthgamage's match fixing allegation claims.

=== July ===
- 1 July
  - Four personnel of the Police Narcotic Bureau are arrested on charges of having links with drug traffickers.
  - Cricketer Upul Tharanga is questioned for two hours by the Special Investigation Unit about the match fixing allegations regarding the 2011 ICC Cricket World Cup final.
- 2 July − Former cricketer Kumar Sangakkara is questioned for eight hours by the Special Investigation Unit about the match fixing allegations regarding the 2011 ICC Cricket World Cup final.
- 3 July − Former cricketer Mahela Jayawardene is questioned by the Special Investigation Unit about the match fixing allegations regarding the 2011 ICC Cricket World Cup final, despite claims by the police that the case is over.
- 5 July − International cricketer Kusal Mendis is arrested after being involved in a fatal road accident in Panadura with an elderly cyclist, who later died in the hospital.
- 6 July − Academic activities of grades 5, 11 and 13 in all government schools recommence.
- 8 July − Former cabinet minister Rohitha Bogollagama resigns from the United National Party and its national list for the upcoming parliamentary election.
- 10 July − A total of 283 people from the Kandakadu Treatment & Rehabilitation Center test positive for COVID-19.
- 12 July − The government of Sri Lanka decides to close all schools again for one week from 13 to 17 July due to the recent Kandakadu COVID-19 outbreak.
- 27 July − Academic activities of grades 11 and up in all government schools recommence.
- 31 July − Former CID director Shani Abeysekara is arrested for fabricating false evidence with regard to a court case against former police officer Vass Gunawardane.

=== August ===
- 1 August – Test cricketer Tharanga Paranavitana retires from international cricket.
- 2 August
  - Sri Lanka emerges as first runners-up in the 2020 Online School Debate Championship, losing to Canada 8–1 in the finals. It was the first instance where Sri Lanka made it to the finals in the history of World Schools Debating Championships. Sri Lanka was also awarded the top-performing ESL team for secondary English-speaking countries.
  - Negombo Prison superintendent Anuruddha Sampayo is arrested.
- 5 August − The 2020 Sri Lankan parliamentary elections were held. The incumbent Sri Lanka People's Freedom Alliance (led by the Sri Lanka Podujana Peramuna) won a landslide victory, claiming 145 seats and winning a two-thirds majority in the Parliament of Sri Lanka.
- 9 August − Hashen Dulanjana Silva wins The Voice Teens, a singing reality competition organized by Sirasa TV.
- 10 August − All government schools reopen in a systematic manner.
- 11 August − 2020 Sri Lankan parliamentary election: Mahinda Rajapaksa is officially sworn in as the 13th Prime Minister of Sri Lanka at Temple Trees.
- 17 August − 2020 Sri Lankan blackouts: Nationwide blackouts occur due to a transmission technical failure at the Kerawalapitiya Power Station. The blackouts began at around 12.30 pm SLST (UTC+5:30) and lasted for over seven hours.
- 20 August
  - 2020 Sri Lankan parliamentary election: Mahinda Yapa Abeywardena is appointed as the speaker of the 16th Parliament of Sri Lanka.
  - Mahela Jayawardene is appointed as the Chairperson of the National Sports Council.
- 27 August − Mayor of the Matale Municipal Council, Daljith Nandalal Aluvihare, is suspended from holding his post with immediate effect.
- 28 August
  - Girl quintuplets are born at the De Soysa Hospital.
  - The Ministry of Education announces that the G.C.E O/L examinations will be held from 18 to 27 January 2021.
  - A minor earth tremor is felt in parts of Kandy.
- 29 August − An underworld hit-man, Kanattagamage Indunil Vajira Kumara alias 'Indra' is shot dead by the police during an escape attempt.
- 31 August
  - The official website for the Temple of the Tooth came under two cyber attacks.
  - Two underworld gangsters, Mohamed Faiz alias 'Pichche Faiz' and 'Kuduruwange Puthraya', are arrested for possession of heroin.
  - Sri Lanka reaches 3000 COVID-19 patients.

=== September ===
- 1 September − A 51-year-old underworld gangster Mohamed Thajudeen Mohamed Shaul Hameed alias 'Sawanna' is arrested for possession of heroin.
- 2 September
  - Schools in Sri Lanka reopen and resume academic activities as usual for all students from grade 6 to 13.
  - Samith Rangana, a Sri Lankan from Matara who worked at a KFC restaurant in the United Arab Emirates dies from an explosion that took place in the restaurant.
- 3 September − The MT New Diamond crude oil tanker catches fire in the eastern sea off Sangaman Kanda in Ampara.
- 4 September − One worker who worked in the boiler room of the MT New Diamond crude oil tanker died.
- 8 September
  - Premalal Jayasekara, who was sentenced to death for murder and held in prison, took oaths as a Member of Parliament.
  - Prime Minister Mahinda Rajapaksa proposes a ban on cattle slaughter, which is highly approved by the Sri Lanka Podujana Peramuna, Rajapaksa's party.
- 20 September – A five-story building in Buwelikada, Kandy collapses, killing a month and a half-old infant and parents.
- 28 September – Former parliamentarian Sujeewa Senasinghe steps down from politics.

=== October ===
- 4 October
  - All schools are closed again, whereas a police curfew is imposed in the Minuwangoda and Divulapitiya police jurisdictions with immediate effect.
  - All tuition classes in Colombo and Gampaha are suspended.
- 9 October
  - A high-powered Chinese delegation, led by former Chinese Foreign Minister and the current Communist Party Political Bureau Member Yang Jiechi, arrives in Colombo.
  - Two international cricketers, Thisara Perera and Dinesh Chandimal, are enlisted to the rank of Major.
- 11 October
  - The Pattithottam & Periyakadei areas in the Mannar District are declared as isolated villages due to the spread of COVID-19.
  - The Grade 5 scholarship examination is held under strict health guidelines at 2,936 examination centres across the island, with 331,694 candidates sitting for the exams.
- 12 October – The G. C. E. Advanced Level Examination commences under strict health guidelines at 2,648 examination centres across the island, with 362,824 candidates sitting for the exams.
- 15 October – The number of COVID-19 patients in the Minuwangoda cluster increased to 1,838.
- 16 October – Yoshitha Rajapaksa, a son of Prime Minister Mahinda Rajapkasa, is appointed as the Prime Minister's Chief of Staff.
- 19 October – Former Minister Rishad Bathiudeen is arrested by the Criminal Investigation Department during a raid in Dehiwala, where he is charged with Criminal Misappropriation of Public Funds and Violation of Election Laws with regard to the Transportation of IDPs in CTB buses to vote at the 2019 Sri Lankan presidential election.
- 20 October – Underworld gang leader Samarasinghe Arachchige Madush Lakshitha alias 'Makandure Madush' is killed in a police shootout during a raid at the Apple Watte Housing Scheme in Maligawatte.

=== November ===
- 13 November – The number of COVID-19 deaths in Sri Lanka exceeds 50 with five new COVID-19 deaths.
- 16 November – Two female officers, Pilot Officer ADPL Gunarathe and Pilot Officer RT Weerawardana, are commissioned as Flying Brevet Pilots and female military aviators for the first time in the history of the Sri Lankan Air Force.
- 18 November – Former State Minister of Fisheries Dilip Wedaarachchi takes a bite out of a raw fish during a live press conference.
- 22 November – Most Ven. Makulewe Vimalabhidana Thero is appointed as Mahanayake of the Sri Lanka Ramanna Sect.
- 23 November – Schools with grades 6 to 13 across the island, excluding those in the Western Province and isolated areas, are reopened to begin the third term.
- 25 November – Four golden caskets were discovered during an excavation at the Southern Vestibule of the Deegavapi Stupa in Ampara. This is the single largest discovery of golden caskets during an excavation in Sri Lanka.
- 26 November – The 2020 Lanka Premier League commences with a virtual opening ceremony for the first time in franchise cricket using a combination of augmented and virtual reality technologies.
- 27 November
  - The number of COVID-19 deaths in Sri Lanka exceeds 100, along with eight new COVID-19 deaths.
  - C. D. Wickramaratne assumes duties as the 35th Inspector General of Police.
- 28 November
  - A presidential pardon is granted for 600 prisoners due to the rapid spread of COVID-19 in Sri Lankan prisons.
  - Popular actress Chathurika Peiris tests positive for COVID-19.
- 29 November – Mahara prison riot: Eight inmates are reportedly killed and about 71 inmates are severely injured during a riot the Mahara prison.
- 30 November – The first virtual cabinet meeting in Sri Lanka was held through video technology.

=== December ===
- 3 December – Attorney-at-Law Kushani Rohanadheera is appointed as the Deputy Secretary-General and Chief of Staff of the Parliament of Sri Lanka.
- 4 December – Two residents of Chankanai and Chavakachcheri are left dead and at least six are injured due to Cyclone Burevi.
- 5 December – The total number of recoveries from COVID-19 in Sri Lanka exceeds 20,000.
- 8 December
  - Sri Lanka's largest wind power farm, Thambapavani Wind Farm in Mannar, is added to the National Grid.
  - The youngest death from COVID-19 in Sri Lanka is reported from the Lady Ridgeway Hospital for Children (LRH), a 20-day-old male infant.
- 9 December – The dead body of a Dutch monk, Netherlanthaye Jinarathana Thero is found at Polgasduwa Aranya Senasanaya in Rathgama on a meditation retreat.
- 10 December – International award-winning Sri Lankan short film Vikaari is released by the Dust Sci-fi channel, the first Sri Lankan film to be released by the Dust Sci-fi channel. The short was directed by Sri Lankan filmmaker Sandun Seneviratne and British filmmaker Charlie Bray.
- 13 December – The total number of deaths from COVID-19 in Sri Lanka surpasses 150.
- 15 December – A fire erupts in the Supreme Court Complex in Colombo, the cause of the fire is unknown.
- 16 December – The Jaffna Stallions win the inaugural Lanka Premier League edition by defeating the Galle Gladiators in the final, which took place at Mahinda Rajapaksa International Cricket Stadium.
- 17 December – A 29-year-old pregnant mother of Kuppiyawatta area, who was positive for COVID-19, gave birth to quadruplets in the De Soysa Hospital for Women.
- 21 December – Governor of the Eastern Province, Anuradha Yahampath, closes all schools in the Trincomalee Education Zone, after 15 COVID-19 patients are reported in the Trincomalee city limits.
- 28 December
  - Lieutenant General Shavendra Silva, Commander of the Sri Lanka Army, Chief of Defense Staff, and head of the National Operations Centre for Prevention of COVID-19 Outbreak (NOCPCO) is promoted to the rank of four-star general by President Gotabaya Rajapaksa.
  - Defense Secretary Major General (Retired) Kamal Gunaratne is promoted to the rank of four star General by President Gotabaya Rajapaksa.
- 30 December – A member of a crime syndicate Saravana Gedara Kelum Udaya Kumara alias 'Thalwatte Kelum' is arrested by the Police Special Task Force in Batuwatte, Ragama.
- 31 December – The total number of deaths from COVID-19 in Sri Lanka reaches 200.

== Deaths ==
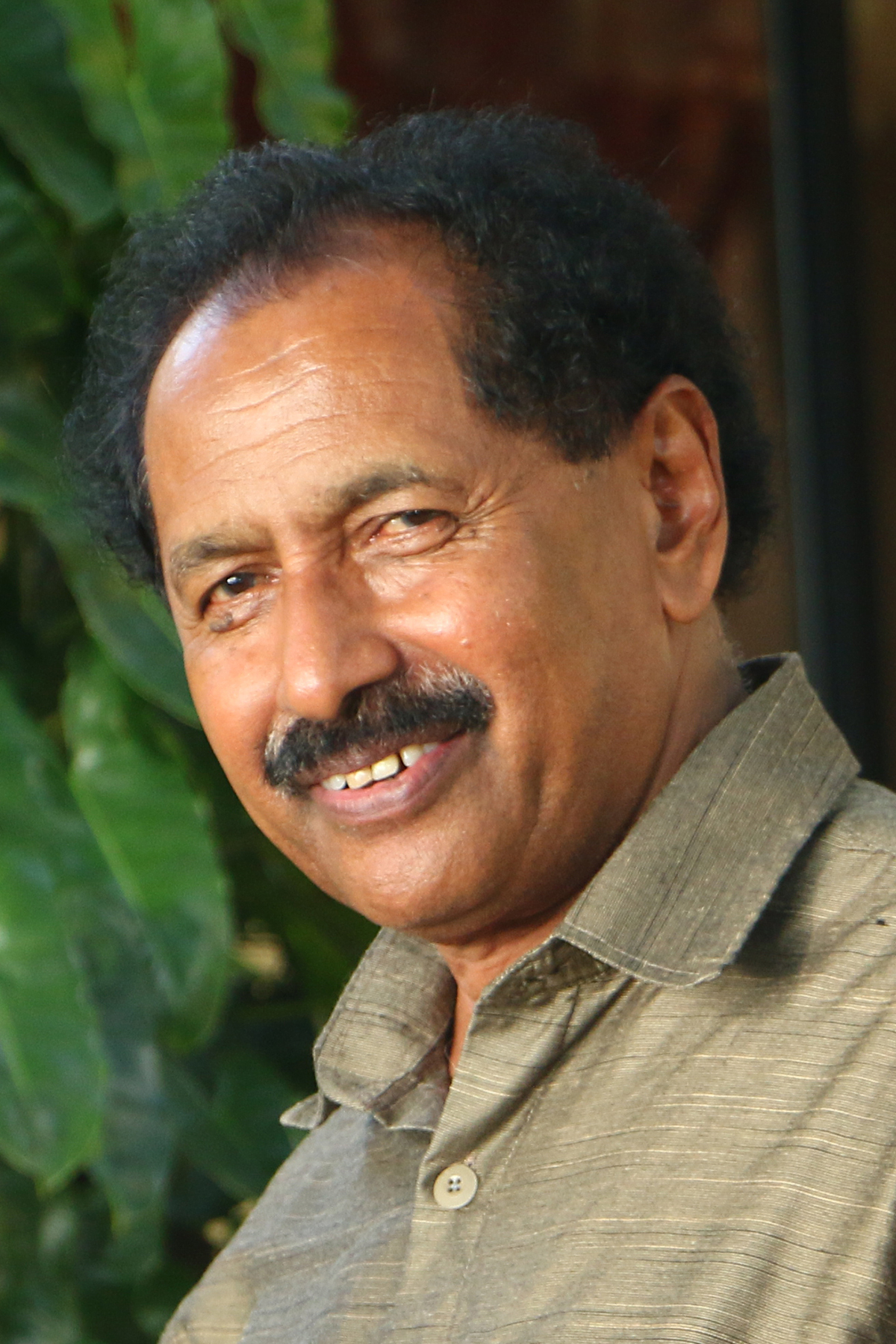
Jayalath Manoratne (b. 1948)

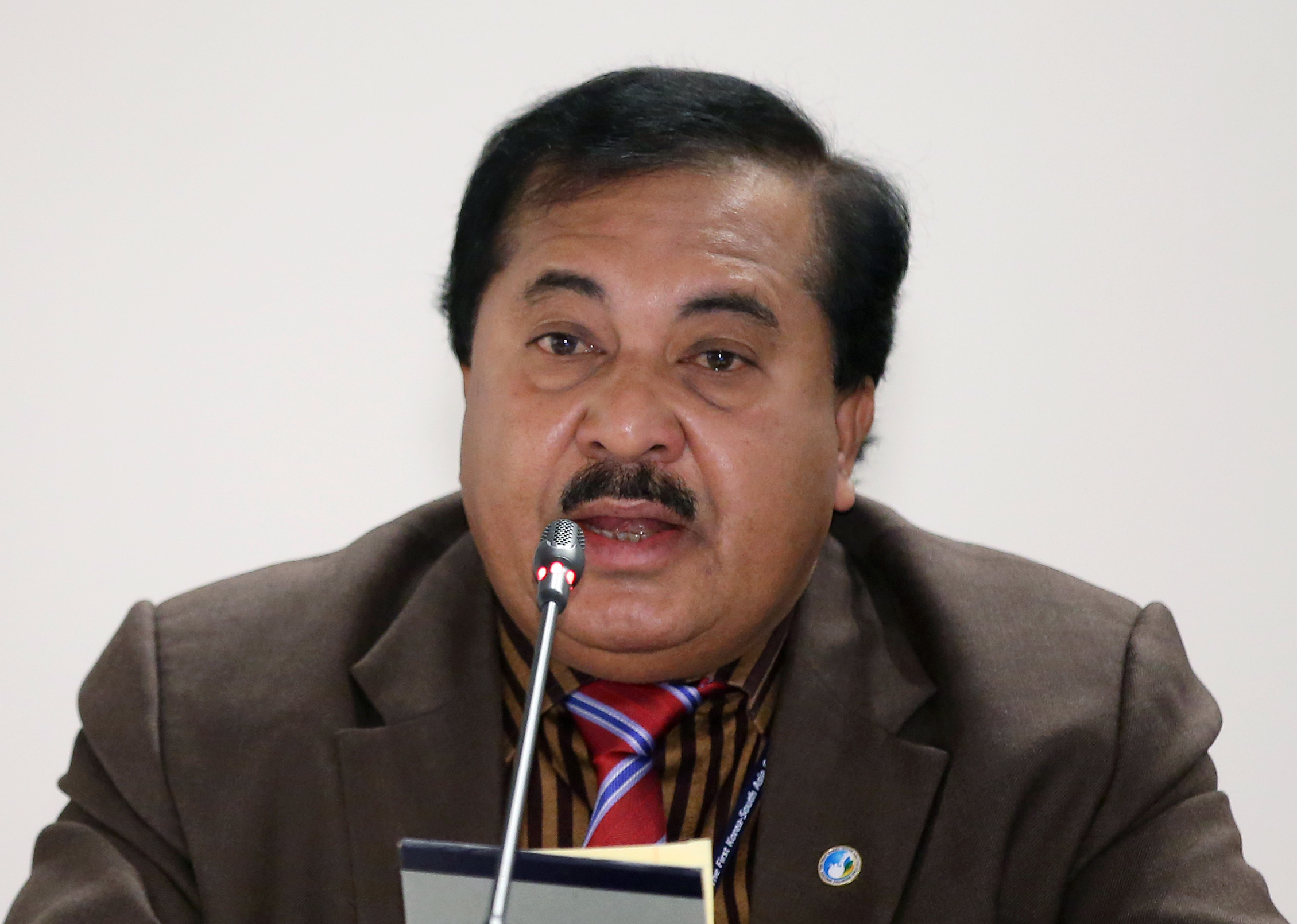
T. B. Ekanayake (b. 1954)

=== January ===
- 1 January − Dr. Roland Silva, 86 (archeologist)
- 8 January − Gunathunga K. Liyanage, 86 (broadcaster)
- 12 January − Jayalath Manoratne, 71 (dramatist)
- 24 January
  - Ariyadasa Hapuarchchi, (singer)
  - Paragoda Siri, 72 (poet)

=== February ===
- 3 February − Chandrasena Dassanayake, 85 (media personality)
- 10 February − Pushpatharanga Ranatunga, 57 (journalist)
- 17 February
  - Ampitiye Rahula Maha Thero, 106 (monk)
  - Ananda Lorensuhewa, 57 (lyricist)
- 20 February − Anura Madhava Jayasekara, 60 (teledrama director)
- 27 February − Sripal Silva, 59 (cricketer)

=== March ===
- 10 March – Ulapane Gunasekara, 76 (voice artist)
- 15 March – Saman Wagaarachchi, 64 (journalist)
- 25 March – Tissa Nagodavithana, 78 (film preservationist)
- 29 March – Piyadasa Athukorale, (musician)

=== April ===
- 4 April
  - Ranjith Abeywickrama, (journalist)
  - Anton Sebastianpillai, 75 (doctor)
- 6 April − Jayantha Rathnayake, 51 (musician)
- 10 April – Nicholas Fernando, 87 (archbishop)
- 16 April − Srilal Abeykoon, 66 (actor)
- 17 April − Daya Thennakoon, 79 (actor)
- 29 April
  - Alexander Fernando, 79 (actor)
  - Kamalani Perera, 91 (singer)
- 30 April
  - Upali Fonseka, 68
  - Noeline Liyanage, 76 (singer)

=== May ===
- 11 May − Tissa Wijesurendra, 71 (actor)
- 17 May − Neville Jayaweera, 89 (civil servant)
- 19 May − Nishantha de Alwis, 72 (filmmaker)
- 22 May − Rohitha Jayasinghe, 93 (singer)
- 26 May − Arumugam Thondaman, 55 (politician)
- 27 May − Thompson S. Wandabona, 84 (author)
- 30 May − Marshal Perera, 89 (politician)

=== June ===
- 8 June − Niel B. Perera, 73 (still photographer)
- 13 June
  - Rohana Deva, 63 (theater producer)
  - Pearl Wijesinghe, 77 (actress)
- 15 June
  - Poojani Liyanage, 33 (women's cricketer)
  - Veenavi Sulakkana, 41 (actress)
- 16 June − Rev. Fr. Ernest Poruthota, 88 (archbishop)
- 23 June − Mervyn Senaratne, 92 (script writer)
- 24 June − Nadarajah Sivam, 74 (actor)

=== July ===
- 1 July − Sybil Wettasinghe, 92 (children's author)
- 4 July − Owen Weerakkody, (broadcaster)
- 5 July
  - Ashoka Wadigamangawa, 68 (politician)
  - William Holmes, 86 (cinematographer)
  - Edmund Jayasuriya, 85 (lyricist)
- 27 July − Saman Weerasiri, 56 (actor)

=== August ===
- 1 August − M. S. Sellasamy, 93 (politician)
- 10 August − Gamini Rodrigo, (singer)
- 11 August
  - Dhammika Ganganath Dissanayake, 62 (diplomat)
  - G. M. Ajith, (poet)
- 18 August − Sarath Yatawara, (film billboard designer)
- 19 August − Parakrama Jayasinghe, (filmmaker)
- 31 August − Morris Wijesinghe, (singer)

=== September ===
- 9 September − Ranjith Dias, 67 (musician)
- 11 September − Tony Opatha, 73 (cricketer)
- 13 September − Amarasena Waduge, 63 (theater producer)
- 28 September − Tennyson Cooray, 68 (actor)

=== October ===
- 6 October − Chandrasiri Ganegoda, (film producer)
- 15 October − Wehelle Piyathilake, 90 (journalist)
- 16 October
  - Anula Bulathsinhala, 73 (dramatist)
  - Ananda Fonseka, 70 (still photographer)
- 19 October − Prof. T. B. Meegaskumbura, 83 (academic)

=== November ===
- 9 November – W. D. Ariyasinghe, 64 (singer)
- 14 November – Sydney Chandrasekara, 61 (journalist)
- 16 November
  - Paul Fernando, 68 (singer)
  - Priyath Liyanage, (journalist)
- 17 November – Most Ven. Napane Pemasiri Thero, 98 (Buddhist clergy)
- 18 November – Bandu Gunasekara, 90 (actor)
- 20 November – Upali Piyaratne, 73 (filmmaker)
- 25 November – Chandramathi Kulandhyvel, 28 (journalist)

=== December ===
- 6 December – T. B. Ekanayake, 66 (politician)
- 9 December – Chandrasiri Dehipitiya, 84 (art director)
- 28 December – Shelton Muthunamage, 72 (singer)
