= Ministry of Livestock and Rural Community Development =

Government ministry of Sri Lanka

Ministry overview
- Dissolved: 9 January 2015
- Jurisdiction: Democratic Socialist Republic of Sri Lanka
- Child agencies: National Livestock Development Board; Milco; Veterinary Research Institute; Department of Animal Production and Health
- Website: livestock.gov.lk

The Ministry of Livestock and Rural Community Development was a cabinet ministry in the Government of Sri Lanka.

== List of ministers ==
Minister of Livestock and Rural Community Development
- Formation: 23 April 2010
- Final holder: Arumugam Thondaman
- Abolished: 9 January 2015

Parties

Sri Lanka Freedom Party United National Party Ceylon Workers' Congress

Name	Portrait	Party	Tenure	President
Arumugam Thondaman		Ceylon Workers' Congress	23 April 2010 – 9 January 2015	Mahinda Rajapaksa
