= 2020 Sri Lankan blackouts =

Nation-wide power blackout

The 2020 Sri Lankan blackouts were a series of electrical blackouts that occurred on 17 August 2020, beginning around 12.30 pm SLST (UTC+5:30) and lasting over seven hours. The nationwide blackouts occurred due to a transmission technical failure at the Kerawalapitiya Grid-Sub station. The Ministry of Power appointed a special committee to investigate the root cause behind the blackout.

== Development ==
The outage caused disruption in day-to-day activities of the public, including causing traffic congestion in Colombo due to malfunctioning of traffic signals and malfunctioning water supply services. Power was restored to the south of the island relatively early, due to it being powered by the Samanala Dam.

Initially, a spokesperson of the Ministry of Power claimed that the outage occurred due to a failure in the Yugadanavi Power Plant. The Minister of Power Dullas Alahapperuma later stated that the outage would be resolved within a space of two hours but the restoration process was delayed for hours due to cascading failures. The power was restored in most parts of the country including Colombo at around 8.30 pm and was regarded as the worst nationwide blackout faced by the country since 2016. The blackout further aggravated the impact of the COVID-19 pandemic in the country. The blackout did not disrupt Bandaranaike International Airport, the main airport of the country, which was closed for months due to the COVID-19 pandemic. Hospitals, offices and other infrastructure had backup power generators.

== Background ==
Sri Lanka's electricity demand is currently met by thermal power stations (54.59%), major hydroelectric power stations (33.50%), and wind farms (2.12%), small hydro facilities (8.01%) and other renewables such as solar (1.78%). Sri Lanka as a whole faced major nationwide blackout during March 2016 which lasted for over eight hours. Localised regional power cuts are common in Sri Lanka although nationwide blackouts are rare.

== Technical description ==
The blackout began when a three-phase fault at Kerawalapitiya thermal power plant took an unusually long time to disconnect from the Sri Lankan electrical system. During that time, the short circuit depressed voltages at the nearby Lakvijaya thermal power plant; both plants ultimately isolated from the Sri Lankan grid to prevent equipment damage. The missing generation induced a very rapid and severe decline in utility frequency that the network's protective devices could not arrest.

== See also ==
- 2019 Sri Lanka electricity crisis
- Power outages in Sri Lanka
