= Ganganath =

Ganganath is a given name. Notable people with the name include:

- Ganganath Jha (1872–1941), Indian scholar
- Ganganath Ratnayake (born 1984), Sri Lankan cricketer
- Dhammika Ganganath Dissanayake (1958–2020), Sri Lankan professor
