= Mohan De Silva (politician) =

Sri Lankan politician (born 1966)

Honourable Mohan De Silva MP
- මොහාන් ද සිල්වා மோகன் டி சில்வா

Minister of Water Supplies
- In office 18 April 2022 – 9 May 2022
- President: Gotabaya Rajapaksa
- Prime Minister: Mahinda Rajapaksa
- Preceded by: Vasudeva Nanayakkara
- Succeeded by: Keheliya Rambukwella

Member of Parliament for Galle District
- Incumbent
- Assumed office 2010

Personal details
- Born: 23 December 1966 (age 59)
- Party: Sri Lanka Podujana Peramuna
- Other political affiliations: Sri Lanka People's Freedom Alliance
- Education: St. Aloysius' College (Galle)
- Profession: Lawyer

Mohan Priyadarshana De Silva (born 23 December 1966) is a Sri Lankan politician, Former Cabinet Minister, and member of the Parliament of Sri Lanka. He belongs to the Sri Lanka Podujana Peramuna. Mohan P. de Silva is a lawyer by profession and was educated at St. Aloysius' College, Galle. Following the mass resignation of the Sri Lankan cabinet in the wake of the 2022 Sri Lankan protests, he was appointed as the Minister of Water Supplies by President Gotabaya Rajapaksa on 18 April 2022, he served in this role until 9 May 2022 following another resignation of the Sri Lankan Cabinet.
