= Cattle slaughter in Sri Lanka =

Cattle slaughter, especially cow slaughter is a controversial topic in Sri Lanka just like neighbouring India, because of the cattle's traditional status as an endeared and respected living being to some sects of Dharmic religions like Hinduism and Buddhism, while being considered an acceptable source of meat by Muslims as well as Christians, and rarely by some Hindus and Buddhists. Cows are killed for the purpose of obtaining beef. The proposals on banning cattle slaughter had been made but not materialised. However some cities with religious importance such as Kandy maintain local bans on slaughter of cows and goats within it's municipal limits.

== Act ==
The Animal Act of Sri Lanka was historically passed in the parliament in 1958 which largely restricts the slaughter of cattle, cows and calves below the age of 12. The Animal Act of 1958 was later amended in 1964 with minor changes and modifications. The Cattle slaughter Ordinance no 9 of 1893 also has provisions about animal slaughter.

== Timeline ==
In 2009, Member of Parliament, Wijeyadasa Rajapaksa presented his proposal in the parliament calling for a whole ban on cattle slaughter. He insisted that banning cattle slaughter would help to generate more employment opportunities for people in the dairy industry. However the government didn't approve the proposal at that time.

In September 2012, the Kandy Municipal Council passed a resolution unanimously to ban cattle slaughter within the boundaries of Kandy municipal area. The issue regarding cattle slaughter became a matter of concern in 2013 when a Buddhist monk set himself on fire after observing a Muslim man eating beef. In the same year, Sinhala Buddhist groups Sinhala Ravaya and Bodu Bala Sena launched awareness campaigns and protests demanding to stop selling meat under Halal certification. In 2018, a Hindu representative group called Siva Senai held a protest in Jaffna against cattle slaughter.

On 8 September 2020, Prime Minister Mahinda Rajapaksa proposed the ban on cattle slaughter which he previously recommended in 2016. On the same day, his proposal was approved by the Parliamentary group of Sri Lanka Podujana Peramuna with the support of all SLPP MPs. The move was also welcomed by Buddhists and Hindus inline with the cultural values. On 10 September 2020, the cabinet spokesman of SLPP Keheliya Rambukwella confirmed that the ban on cattle slaughter was postponed to October 2020. On 29 September 2020, the cabinet approved the proposal on banning cattle slaughter permanently from the country. However the law was ultimately not implemented.

== See also ==
- Cattle slaughter in India
- Cow protection movement
- Livestock in Sri Lanka
