= Ambatale Water Treatment Plant =

Water treatment plant in Ambatale, Sri Lanka

- Built: 1966 (Original Plant); 1994 (New Plant)
- Location: Ambatale, Western Province
- Coordinates: 06°55′55″N 79°56′42″E
- Industry: Water supply
- Products: Drinking water (550,000 m^{3}/d (19,000,000 cu ft/d))
- Owner: National Water Supply and Drainage Board (NWSDB)

The Ambatale Water Treatment Plant (often abbreviated as Ambatale WTP) is the largest potable water production facility in Sri Lanka. Operated by the National Water Supply and Drainage Board (NWSDB), it serves as the primary source of drinking water for the Colombo Metropolitan Area, supplying approximately 50% of the piped water for the Western Province.

The facility abstracts water from the Kelani River, which is treated to WHO standards before being distributed to Colombo, Dehiwala-Mount Lavinia, Kotte, Maharagama, and surrounding suburbs.

== History ==
The requirement for a large-scale water treatment facility in Ambatale arose in the mid-20th century due to the rapid urbanization of Colombo.

- Original Plant (1966): Construction began in the early 1960s, and the original "Main Plant" was commissioned in 1966 with a capacity of 337,500 m^{3}/d (11,920,000 cu ft/d). This facility introduced Degrémont "Pulsator" clarifier technology to Sri Lanka.
- New Plant (1994): To meet increasing demand, a second facility known as the "New Plant" was commissioned in 1994. This expansion was funded by the Japan International Cooperation Agency (JICA) and added 180,000 m^{3}/d (6,400,000 cu ft/d) to the total capacity.
- Modernization (2003–Present): A subsequent expansion was completed in 2003. More recently, the "Ambatale Water Supply System Improvement and Energy Saving Project," funded by the Agence Française de Développement (AFD) and Asian Development Bank (ADB), has been upgrading the intake pumps and transmission lines since 2014.

== Infrastructure ==
The Ambatale complex comprises multiple treatment units, intakes, and pumping stations located on the southern bank of the Kelani River.

=== Intake and Treatment ===
The facility abstracts raw water from the Kelani River through large intake structures. The treatment process typically involves:

1. Aeration: To remove dissolved gases and volatile organic compounds.
2. Coagulation and Flocculation: Using Alum to bind suspended particles.
3. Clarification: The plant utilizes proprietary Pulsator and Superpulsator clarifier technologies (originally developed by Degrémont), which use a pulsed sludge blanket to filter out particles efficiently. # Filtration: Rapid sand filters remove remaining fine particulate matter.
4. Disinfection: Gas chlorination is used to eliminate pathogens before distribution.

=== Salinity Barrier ===
A critical geographical challenge for the Ambatale plant is its proximity to the river mouth (approx. 14 km downstream). During drought periods (typically January to March), the river flow drops, allowing a "salt wedge" from the Indian Ocean to intrude upstream. If salinity levels at the intake exceed potable standards, pumping must be suspended.

- Temporary Measures: For decades, the NWSDB constructed a temporary sandbag barrier across the river annually to physically block saltwater.
- Permanent Barrier: In 2019, a project was awarded to construct a permanent gated salinity barrier. While design and initial works have commenced, the project has faced delays, and temporary measures often remain necessary during severe droughts.

== Incidents ==
=== Salinity Intrusion Crises ===
The plant has frequently faced operational shutdowns due to high salinity. Notable incidents occurred in 1991, 2017, and 2019, where water supply to Colombo was restricted for days until river flows increased or sandbag barriers were reinforced.

=== 2025 Flood Threat ===
During the 2025 Sri Lanka floods caused by Cyclone Ditwah in late November, the Kelani River reached "Major Flood" levels, directly threatening the Ambatale facility.

- On 29 November 2025, the NWSDB Chairman warned that the rising floodwaters had submerged critical intakes and pumps.
- A total shutdown of the plant was threatened if the water level rose an additional seven feet, which would have severed the water supply to the entire Colombo City region during the disaster.
- Simultaneously, the nearby flood bund was reported to be at risk of breaching, prompting evacuation orders for the immediate vicinity.

== See also ==
- Ambatale Storm Water Pumping Station
- National Water Supply and Drainage Board
- Kelani River
