= Livestock in Sri Lanka =

Animal husbandry

In Sri Lanka many farmers depend on animal husbandry for their livelihood, but not a large proportion. Therefore, many livestock products have to be imported. The main livestock products in Sri Lanka are milk, meat and eggs. Hides, wools and other products are still not produced within the country. Animal power formerly used in the cultivation of rice and vegetables have been replaced by modern technology to farmlands. However animal husbandry plays an important role in the rural economy for improving the living conditions of farmers in the country.

The land area of Sri Lanka is 65,610 km^{2}. and of this, 30% belongs to agricultural activities. From that 30%, 70% is solely devoted to crop production. The remainder consists of a mixture of crops and livestock. Hence, a very small proportion of the farmland is solely devoted to livestock production. In Sri Lanka, livestock sector contributes around 1.2% of the national GDP. Livestock is spread throughout all regions of Sri Lanka with concentrations of certain farming systems in particular areas due to cultural, market and agro-climatic reasons. According to statistics from the Department of Animal Production and Health, there are about 1.3 million cattle, 0.3 million buffalo, 0.4 million goats, 13 million poultry and 0.08 million pigs in the country with negligible numbers of sheep, ducks and other animal breeds.

== Consumption of meat and dairy products ==
The per capita consumption of milk and dairy products in Sri Lanka (about 36 kg) is less, compare to other countries in the South Asian region. Since the 1980s Sri Lanka import dry milk powder as their main dairy commodity from Australia and New Zealand up to now.

=== Main dairy/meat products ===
A very few types of dairy products are locally processed by a few companies as well as household producers in the country. The most leading product among them is yoghurt and hundreds of trade names are available to buy it. Other main dairy products are ice cream, curd, ghee, liquid milk (pasteurized and flavoured), cheese and some sweets.

== Livestock Breeds ==
Domestic breeds are rarely used as livestock breeds in Sri Lanka. A large portion of livestock breeds are cross or introduced breeds. Because local breeds have poor productive ability and improper quality of milk and meat.

== Cattle ==
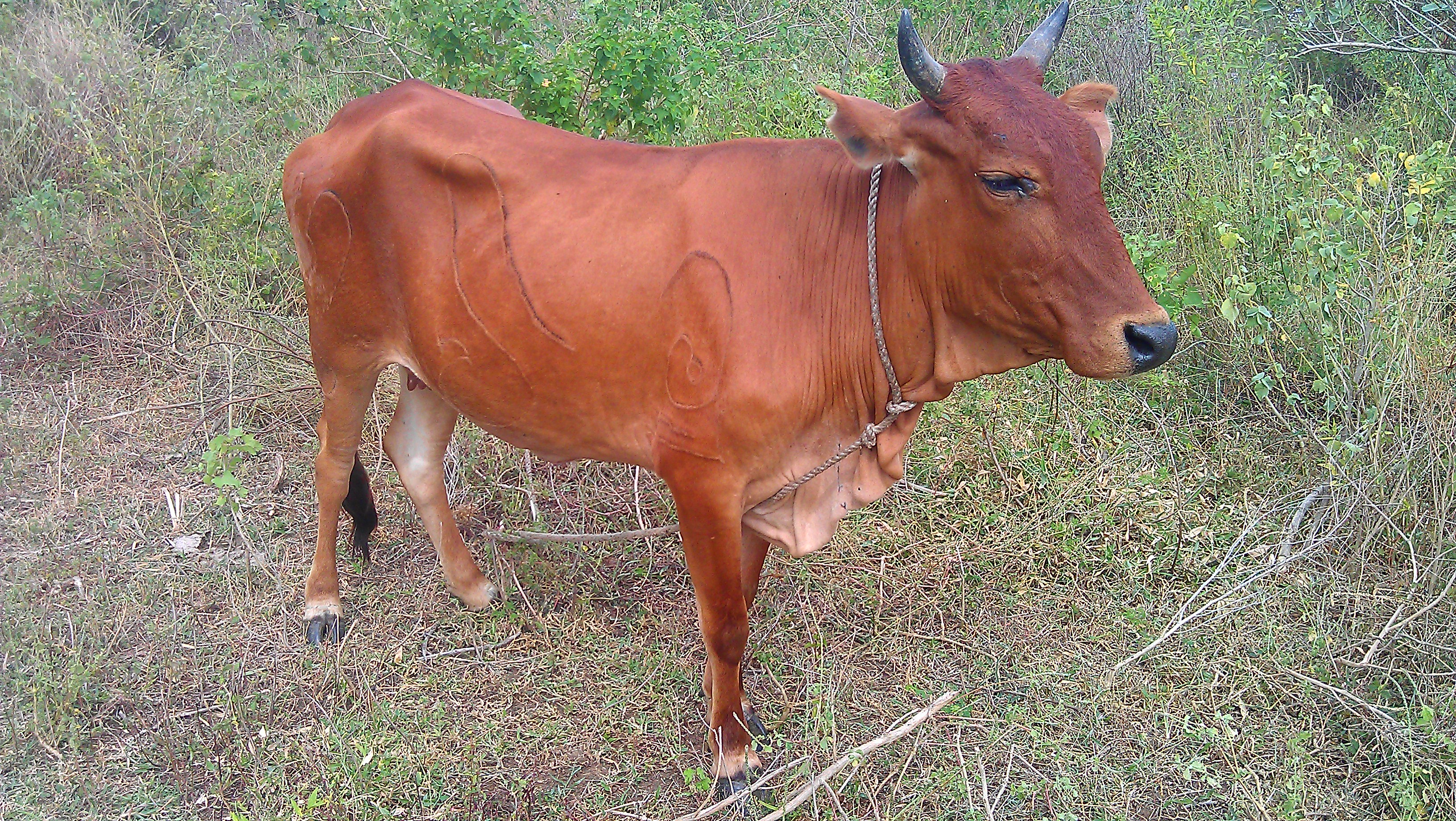
Domestic cattle breed

There are few breeds of dairy cattle used for milk production. The selection of a cattle breed largely depends on the bio-climatic condition in the region. European breeds are recommended for upcountry wet and intermediate zones, while Indian breeds are recommended for low country dry and intermediate zones. There are also cross breeds for the low country wet zone.

=== Cattle breeds for up country ===
- Ayrshire
- Friesian
- Jersey

=== Cattle breeds for low country ===
- Sindhi
- Sahiwal
- Tharparkar (cattle)
- AMZ (Australian Milking Zebu)
- AFS (Australian Frisian x Sahiwal)
- Local crossbreeds. ("Indigenous" or "native" "local" is no longer valid; they are cross breeds of indigenous cattle with Indian bos indicus breeds and mostly found in the dry zone of Sri Lanka. True indigenous breed of local cattle became extinct in the late 1930s. Recently they have been called "Lankan Cattle, but not true Lankan cattle).

With the exception of a few breeds, most of the dairy breeds can be used in most bio-climatic areas providing that the level of management is high and the availability of quality fodder is well planned. The Australian Frisian x Sahiwal has not met the expectations of a tropical dairy breed.

=== Cattle breeds for mid-country ===
- Jersey
- Friesian
- AMZ

Hatton cow or Cape cattle were good milking breeds available before the present exotic milk breeds were popularised, presently extinct.

Local breed Thamankaduwa White Cattle confined to the eastern part of the island

=== Cattle breeding ===
The main cattle breeding method is using Artificial insemination (AI), which covers approximately 60% and Natural Breeding using improved breeds of stud bulls is practiced in remote areas and it covers approximately 25% of the total. Artificial Insemination (AI) is being practiced using locally produced semen and a limited amount of imported semen.

There are two AI Stations available in Sri Lanka, namely Central Artificial Insemination Station (CAIS) situated in Kundasale, in Kandy district and Artificial Insemination Station situated at Kaduruwela, Polonnaruwa.

== Buffalo Breeds ==
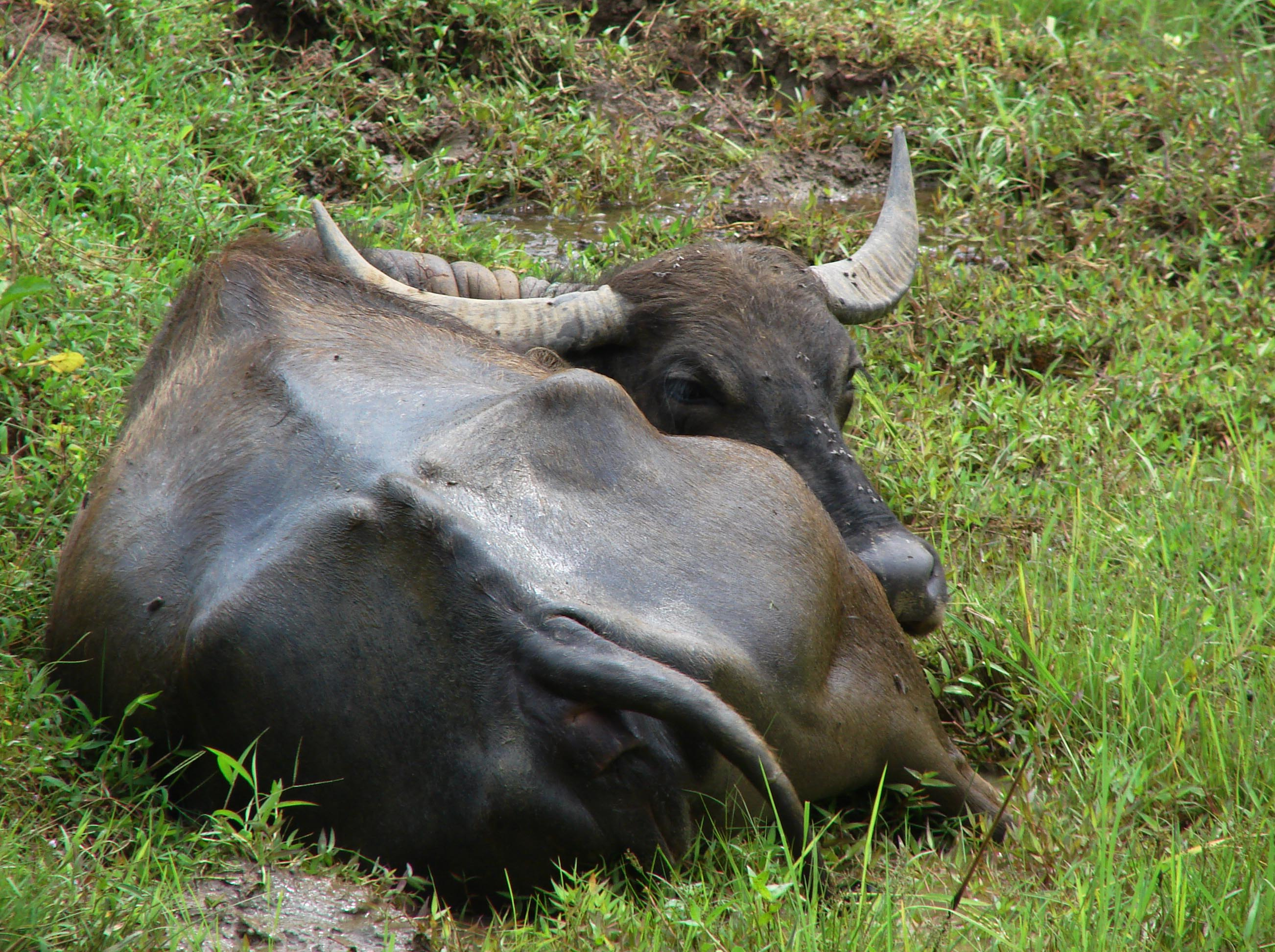
Domestic water buffalo breed

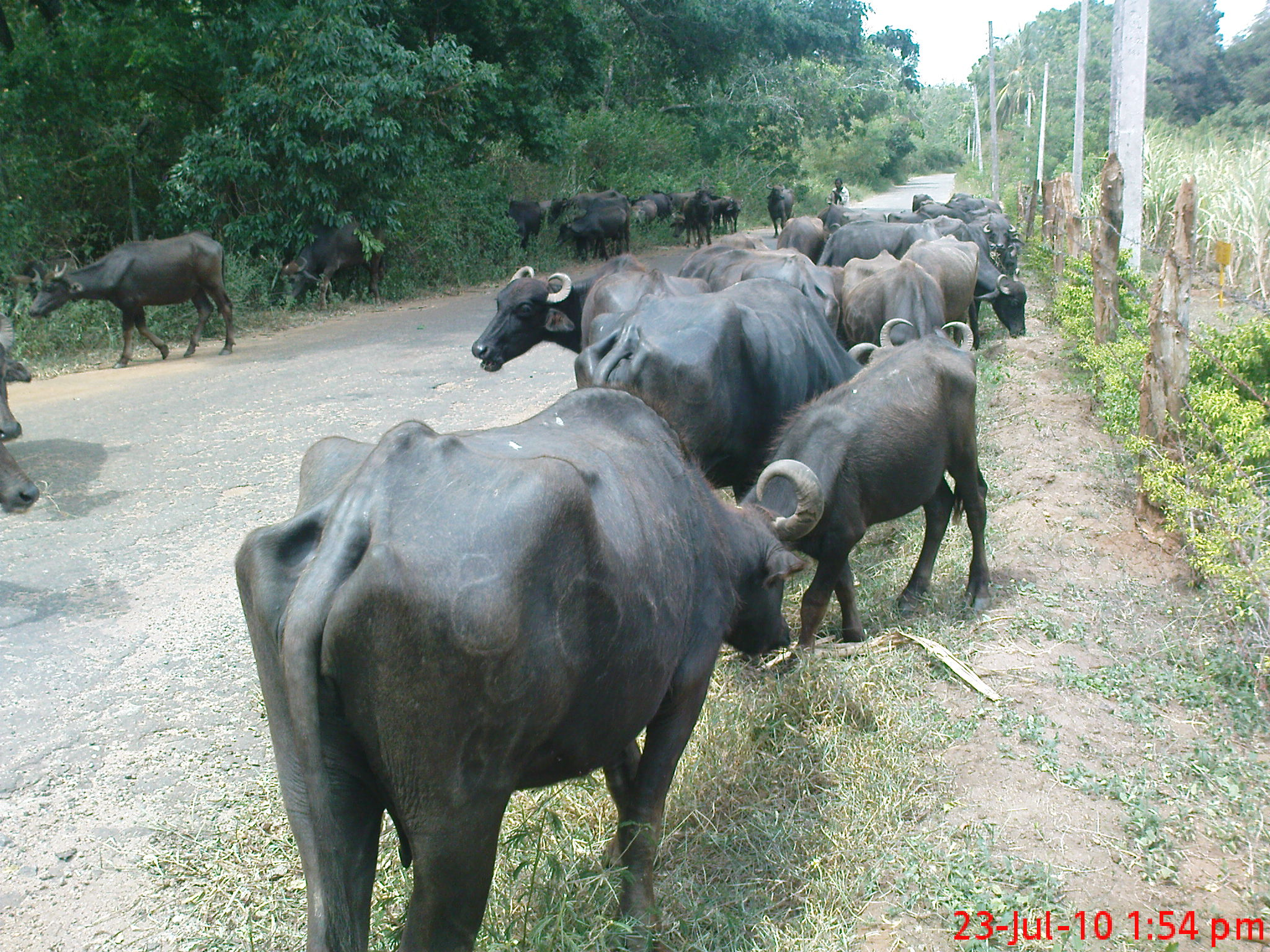
Herd of water buffalo in dry zone area

Water buffaloes are reared for draught and milk production. Local buffaloes produce low milk yield and in the rural sector they mainly kept for power in rice cultivation to plough and harrow the fields. Introduced Indian breeds are mainly kept for milk production and for cross breeding with local buffaloes for upgrading. A large portion of water buffalo milk is used for curd and ghee production. Water buffalo meat is not very popular within Sri Lanka and is legally banned for slaughter.

- Murrah
- Niliravi
- Surti(Pure bloodlines cannot be found in Sri Lanka at present. They are mixed with other breeds of buffaloes

These three Indian breeds are Riverine type water buffaloes they prefer clear water to wallow.

- Domestic buffalo (Phenotypically swamp type (prefer mud puddles for wallowing), but genetically riverine)

== Goat Breeds available in Sri Lanka ==
- Saanen- for milk production
- Jamnapari - for meat and milk
- Crosses of Jamnapari & Saanen - for meat and milk
- Boer imported from Germany for cross breeding with Jamnapari or Kottukachchiya breed to establish a new synthetic breed called Sri Lankan Boer
- Nondescript local crossbreds (local breed) - meat
- Crosses of Jamnapari, Saanen x Local breed - meat

=== Goat Breeding Farms ===
- Thelahera Goat Breeding Farm in Kurunegala District, Imbulandanda Goat Breeding Farm in Matale district of Department of Animal Production & Health (DAP&H).

Breed - Jamnapari, (Original herd imported from India in 1997 by the Ministry of Livestock and Rural Industrial Development.)

- Bopatahlawa Farm in Nuwara Eliya district and Mahaberiyatenna Farm in Kandy district of The National Livestock Development Board (NLDB).

Breed - Saanen (Original herd Imported from The Netherlands)

=== Other goat breeds previously available in Sri Lanka but presently vanished ===
- Kottukachchiya - Synthetic breed developed in the late 1960s for meat
- Beetal - for milk and meat
- German Boer - meat
- Sri Lanka Boer (German Boer X Kottukachchiya / Jamnapari) - meat
- German fawn - milk and meat
- Akyub extinct breed recorded in literature found in Jaffna Peninsula believed to be brought from Burma (Myanmar)

== Sheep breeds ==
- Jaffna Local
- Bikenary
- Bannur
- Red Madras
- Dorset

All the above breeds are kept for meat. Present the few insignificant numbers found are all crossbreds.

=== Previously Operated Goat & Sheep Breeding Farms ===
- Kottukachchiya Farm - DAP&H, SRL / GTZ Goat Development Project. - Goat Breeding
- Weerawila and Ridigama in the Southern Province
- Boralanda Farm - DAP&H - Sheep Breeding
- Siringapatha NLDB Farm

== Pig breeds ==
- local landrace / "mini pigs" - extensively managed / Scavenging

Exotic breeds raised about 40 years ago

- Berkshire
- Yorkshire
- Large Black
- Blue Pigs (Large White X Large Black)

Present day exotic breeds

- Large White
- Middle White
- Landrace
- Duroc
