= Ambatale =

Ambatale Sinhala: අඹතලේ / Tamil: அம்பத்தலை
- Suburb
- Location within Sri Lanka
- Coordinates: 6°56′14″N 79°56′42″E
- Country: Sri Lanka
- Province: Western Province
- District: Colombo District
- Divisional Secretariat: Kolonnawa

Government
  - Type: Pradeshiya Sabha
  - Body: Kotikawatta-Mulleriyawa
- Time zone: UTC+5:30 (Sri Lanka Standard Time)
- Postal Code: 10600

Ambatale (Sinhala: අඹතලේ; Tamil: அம்பத்தலை), sometimes also spelt Ambathale, is a suburban settlement in the Colombo District, Western Province of Sri Lanka. Situated approximately 12 kilometres (7.5 mi) east of the commercial capital Colombo, it lies on the southern bank of the Kelani River.

The settlement is nationally significant as a critical utility hub, hosting the country's largest water treatment facility and a major flood control pumping station, both of which serve the Colombo Metropolitan Area.

== Geography and Administration ==
Ambatale is located in the floodplains of the lower Kelani River valley. It is bordered by Mulleriyawa to the south, Kaduwela to the east, and Kelaniya across the river to the north. The typography is characteristically flat, making the area historically prone to flooding during the Southwest Monsoon.

Administratively, the settlement falls under the Kolonnawa Divisional Secretariat. It constitutes the Ambathale A Grama Niladhari Division (Division No. 501A).

== Infrastructure ==
=== Water Supply ===
The area is best known for hosting the **Ambatale Water Treatment Plant**, the largest potable water facility in Sri Lanka. Operated by the National Water Supply and Drainage Board (NWSDB), the plant abstracts water directly from the Kelani River to supply approximately 50% of the drinking water for the Western Province, including Colombo City and Dehiwala-Mount Lavinia. The intake is located at a strategic point that is susceptible to salinity intrusion during droughts, often necessitating the deployment of salinity barriers to protect the water supply.

=== Flood Control ===
The Ambatale Storm Water Pumping Station is situated at the confluence of the Madiwela East Diversion Canal and the Kelani River. Commissioned circa 2021 under the Metro Colombo Urban Development Project (MCUDP), this facility prevents the Kelani River from backflowing into the canal network during high river stages. It features five pumps with a total capacity of 20 cubic metres per second (710 cu ft/s), designed to lift inland storm water over the river bund for safe discharge.

== See also ==
- Kelani River
- National Water Supply and Drainage Board
- Mulleriyawa
