= Biyagama Water Treatment Plant =

Water treatment plant in Sri Lanka

- Location within Sri Lanka
- Interactive map of Biyagama Water Treatment Plant
- Coordinates: 06°56′44″N 79°57′27″E
- Daily capacity: 160,000,000 L/d (35,000,000 imp gal/d)
- Operation date: July 22, 2013

The Biyagama Water Treatment Plant or BWTP is a water treatment facility located at the bank of Kelani River, in Biyagama, Sri Lanka. At a daily output capacity of 160,000,000 L/d (1,900,000 L/ks), it is the second largest water treatment facility in the country. The plant provides drinking water to approximately one million people, in Wattala, Ja-Ela, Kelaniya, Biyagama, Ragama, Kandana, Kadawatha, Kiribathgoda, Seeduwa and Ganemulla, within the Gampaha District.

Construction of the facility began on 22 October 2008. It was ceremonially inaugurated by President Mahinda Rajapakse on 22 July 2013. The facility uses raw water from the Kelani River. The maximum water loss during the purification process is 5%, due to raw water transmission, sludge de-watering and backwash.

Design capacity of treatment units
Unit	Quantity	Nominal capacity	Maximum capacity
Intake structure	2	381,800 m^{3}/d (13,480,000 cu ft/d)	
Raw water regulation tank	1	187,300 m^{3}/d (6,610,000 cu ft/d)	
Mixing chamber	1	187,300 m^{3}/d (6,610,000 cu ft/d)	
Flocculator/clarifier	6	31,200 m^{3}/d (1,100,000 cu ft/d)	37,500 m^{3}/d (1,320,000 cu ft/d)
Filter	8	23,400 m^{3}/d (830,000 cu ft/d)	26,800 m^{3}/d (950,000 cu ft/d)
Clean water/contact tank	1	181,800 m^{3}/d (6,420,000 cu ft/d)	187,300 m^{3}/d (6,610,000 cu ft/d)

== Extension ==
The Kelani Right Bank Water Supply Project - Phase 2 is a Rs. 8.5 billion project to significantly increase the production to 360,000 m^{3}/d (13,000,000 cu ft/d). The expansion project is ongoing as of June 2019, by Maga Engineering and Suez.

== See also ==
- Ambatale Water Treatment Plant
