= National Water Supply and Drainage Board =

National organisation in Sri Lanka

- ජාතික ජලසම්පාදන හා ජලපවහන මණ්ඩලය தேசிய நீர் வழங்கல் வடிகாலமைப்பு சபை

Agency overview
- Formed: 1975; 51 years ago
- Preceding agency: Department of Water Supply and Drainage
- Jurisdiction: Government of Sri Lanka
- Headquarters: Golumadama Junction, Ratmalana, Sri Lanka; 6.809712°N 79.883354°E
- Minister responsible: Jeevan Thondaman, Minister of Water Supply
- Deputy Minister responsible: Shashindra Rajapaksa - State Minister of Water Supply
- Agency executives: Chandana Bandara, Chairman; Ruwan Liyanage, General Manager
- Parent department: Ministry of Water Supply
- Key document: National Water Supply and Drainage Board Law, No. 2 of 1974
- Website: waterboard.lk

The National Water Supply and Drainage Board (commonly abbreviated as NWSDB) is the national organisation responsible for the provision of safe drinking water and facilitating the provision of sanitation to the people in Sri Lanka. The organisation had its beginning as a subdepartment under the Public Works Department (established in 1948) for water supply and drainage. In 1965, it became a division under the Ministry of Local Government. From 1970, this division functioned as a separate department under the Ministry of Irrigation, Power and Highways and remained so until the present board was established in January 1975 under the parlimentary act, National Water Supply and Drainage Board Act, No. 2 of 1974.

The main functions of the National Water Supply and Drainage Board, which presently functions under the Ministry of Water Supply, are operation and maintenance of water supply and sewerage schemes, implementation of new urban and rural water supply projects, carrying out sector planning, feasibility studies, detailed designs, tender documentation, contract administration, project supervision, and research and development work in the water and sanitation sector.

In 2021 it operated 331 separate water supply schemes, with 2.4 million domestic connections and 207,000 commercial connections, which constituting 43.8% of the piped-water supply coverage and 93.8% total safe drinking water coverage in the country. At the end of June 2026 the total number of connections had increased to 3.31 million, representing 62.8% of the piped-water supply coverage and 94.5% of the total safe drinking water coverage.

In November 2026 the former chairman of the board, Nishantha Ranatunga, was arrested over corruption charges, which allegedly occurred during his tenure as chairman. The current chairman is Chandana Bandara, who was appointed on 3 June 2025.

== Regional Support Centers (RSC's) ==
National Water Supply and Drainage Board consists of twelve regional support centres based in nine provinces of Sri Lanka.

- Western Central
- Western North
- Western South
- Western Production
- Central
- Southern
- North Central
- Northern
- North Western
- Sabaragamuwa
- Uva
- Eastern

== See also ==
- Biyagama Water Treatment Plant
