= W. D. Ariyasinghe =

Sri Lankan musician (1956–2020)

W. D. Ariyasinghe ඩබ්. ඩී. ආරියසිංහ
- Born: Widanelage Dharmaratna Ariyasinghe; 16 March 1956; Kandy, Sri Lanka
- Died: 9 November 2020 (aged 64); Kalapura, Dehiwala-Mount Lavinia, Colombo, Sri Lanka
- Education: Pilimathalawa Central College; University of Kelaniya
- Occupations: Musician, singer, composer, teacher
- Years active: 1980–2020
- Awards: Kalabhushana State Awards (2017)

Widanelage Dharmaratna Ariyasinghe (16 March 1956 – 9 November 2020, Sinhala: ඩබ්. ඩී. ආරියසිංහ), popularly known as W. D. Ariyasinghe, was a Sri Lankan singer, musician and a composer.

== Personal life ==
He was born on 16 March 1956 in Kandy, Sri Lanka as the fifth child in the family with eight. He completed education from Pilimathalawa Central College. Later, he graduated with Bachelor of Fine Arts from University of the Visual and Performing Arts.

He was married to fellow musician Darshani Chandrasena after a long-standing relationship since university period. Darshani is the youngest daughter of the musician late R. A. Chandrasena. She was graduated with Fine Arts degree in 1983 before Ariyasinghe and worked as visiting lecturer at the university for three years. The couple has two sons; Harshadewa and Pulasthi. His son Harshadewa is also a singer.

After undergoing a hip surgery due to an accident some time ago, his health was improving and he was advised by the doctor to rest for about three months. However, he died on 9 November 2020 at the age of 64 after a prolonged illness.

== Career ==
During university period, he studied music under the maestro W. D. Amaradeva. After the graduation in 1988, he worked as a music teacher at Sarasavipaya (adjacent to Elphinstone Theatre) with his wife Darshani. Later they managed the popular "R. A Chandrasena Music Institute" which was founded by his father-in-law R A Chandrasena. He met the musician and composer Premasiri Khemadasa who invited Ariyasinghe to sing a collection of popular songs that Khemadasa has composed along with Ajantha Ranasinghe that Amaradeva had sung originally. The songs were recorded on the album called 'Prema Sandevo'. He was later criticized for being a copycat of Amaradeva. During this period, he became a 'Grade A' singer at the Sri Lanka Broadcasting Corporation (SLBC) and recorded over 1,000 songs at SLBC.

In 1986, he got his first appointment as a music teacher at Bandaranayake Central College, Uduwela, Barawardhanaoya. In 1991, he got appointed to D. S. Senanayake College, Colombo 7 as a Music Teacher where he served for 15 continuous years. Later, he left the teaching profession and became a full-time musician. He sang several popular songs such as Ma Langatama Thawa Lan Wela, Thisara Thudata and Walakulu Pelin Basinna and also voiced jingles of several popular TV advertisements. Ma Lagatama Thawa Lanwela composed by Tissasiri Perera and written by Ajantha Ranasinghe became one of the most popular songs.
