= Power outages in Sri Lanka =

Sri Lanka's electricity sector has been impacted by several major power outages.

== 2016 blackout ==
Sri Lanka faced major nationwide blackout in March 2016 which lasted for over eight hours.

== 2019 blackouts ==
Following a severe drought that impacted hydroelectric plants, Sri Lanka experienced rolling blackouts for nearly a month from 18 March to 10 April 2019. The blackouts occurred for three to five hours per day except on Sundays in all parts of the country.

It was revealed that the Ceylon Electricity Board (CEB), the main electricity provider in Sri Lanka, had restricted power supply to almost all regions of the country without prior notice and implemented a time schedule unofficially from 24 March 2019. President Maithripala Sirisena ordered authorities to take necessary action and remedies to solve the interrupted power supply issue. The CEB was widely criticised for its unauthorized action to limit power supply without any public notice and it was alleged that the power crisis resulted due to the inabilities and inefficiencies of the CEB in implementing long-term plans regarding the supply of electricity.

Prime Minister Ranil Wickremesinghe and Minister of Power and Renewable Energy Ravi Karunanayake issued a notice that the temporal power cut crisis would be solved before Sinhalese New Year and Puthandu, which fell on 13 and 14 April respectively. According to Karunanayake, the power cuts ended on 10 April and assured that electricity bills would not be increased and further charges would not be incurred from the public.

== 2020 blackouts ==
Sri Lanka faced a series of electrical blackouts on 17 August 2020, beginning around 12.30 pm SLST (UTC+5:30) and lasting over seven hours. The nationwide blackouts occurred due to a transmission technical failure at the Kerawalapitiya Grid-Sub station. The Ministry of Power appointed a special committee to investigate the root cause behind the blackout.

The blackout began when a three-phase fault at Kerawalapitiya thermal power plant took an unusually long time to disconnect from the Sri Lankan electrical system. During this time, the short circuit depressed voltages at the nearby Lakvijaya thermal power plant; both plants ultimately isolated from the Sri Lankan grid to prevent equipment damage. The missing generation induced a very rapid and severe decline in utility frequency that the network's protective devices could not arrest.

The outage caused disruption in day-to-day activities of the public, including traffic congestion in Colombo due to malfunctioning of traffic signals and malfunctioning water supply services. Power was restored to the southern parts of the island relatively early, due to it being powered by the Samanala Dam.

Initially, a spokesperson of the Ministry of Power claimed that the outage occurred due to a failure in the Yugadanavi Power Plant. Minister of Power Dullas Alahapperuma later stated that the outage would be resolved within a space of two hours but the restoration process was delayed for hours due to cascading failures. The power was restored in most parts of the country including Colombo at around 8.30 pm and was regarded as the worst nationwide blackout faced by the country since 2016. The blackout further aggravated the impact of the COVID-19 pandemic in the country. The blackout did not disrupt Bandaranaike International Airport, the main airport of the country, which was closed for months due to the COVID-19 pandemic. Hospitals, offices and other infrastructure had backup power generators.

== 2023 blackouts ==
The island country experienced a nationwide blackout on 9 December 2023, beginning at around 5.00 pm SLST (UTC+5:30) and lasting for over three hours. The blackouts occurred due to a systematic failure in the main supply chain and due to a breakdown of the Kotmale Biyagama transmission line.

The Ministry of Power and Energy issued a statement claiming that an island-wide blackout occurred due to the multiple lightning strikes on several transformers and power stations. The Ceylon Electricity Board stated that it had been working continuously to restore power to all regions of Sri Lanka.

== 2025 blackouts ==
Nationwide blackouts began at around 11.30 am SLST (UTC+5:30) on 9 February 2025 and lasted for over five to six hours. The blackouts were attributed to a massive disruption caused by a monkey, which had apparently intervened to trigger an irreparable damage which made it unable to restore the electricity in most parts of Sri Lanka immediately after the incident had unfolded.

The Ministry of Power and Energy issued a statement clarifying that an island-wide blackout had occurred after a monkey had broken into a sub-station in Sri Lanka's electrical grid. The Ceylon Electricity Board in a press statement claimed that the incident took place in the Panadura substation. "A monkey has come in contact with our grid transformer, causing an imbalance in the system," as quoted by the Minister of Power and Energy Kumara Jayakody in a press conference. According to documentary evidence from daily newspaper Daily Mirror, the power was fully restored across various parts of the country by about 6pm. The outage apparently caused three generators at the Lakvijaya Power Station in Norochcholai to become inoperative.

On 10 February 2025, the Ceylon Electricity Board announced that power cuts would be imposed on a 90-minute schedule across various parts of Sri Lanka on a selected basis on 10 and 11 February 2025 as a precautionary and proactive measure to combat derailments after the monkey induced power outage saga and also to manage electricity demand across four important zones.

The Sri Lankan monkey became a trending topic and sparked massive global media attention after being named as the main culprit behind the blackouts. The incident was deemed as bizarre considering the circumstances behind the incident, as authorities initially speculated that the outage would have occurred due to the possibility of technical failures. Many were skeptical that a single monkey could even cause such a widespread power outage at all and spread memes about the blackouts. Others criticized the complacency and fragile nature of Sri Lanka's power grid, with one user writing, "One monkey = total chaos. Time to rethink infrastructure?"

== 2026 blackout ==
Sri Lanka suffered another nationwide electricity blackout on October 17, 2026, which started around 11:45 a.m. and lasted for roughly six hours before grid power was restored in stages across the island.

Officials and the state-owned National System Operator (NSO) indicated the trip was likely caused by an imbalance when high rooftop solar power generation exceeded low daytime demand during a weekend holiday, alongside a suspected disruption at the Upper Kotmale Power Station.
