= Siva Senai =

Hindu nationalist political group in Sri Lanka

Siva Senai சிவா சேனை
- Abbreviation: SS
- Leader: Maravanpulavu Sachchithananthan
- Founder: Maravanpulavu Sachchithananthan
- Founded: 12 October 2016; 9 years ago
- ECSL status: Registered
- Armed wing: Siva Senai (H)
- Ideology: Shaivism; Hindutva; Hindu nationalism
- Political position: Right-wing

Election symbol
- Nandi

Party flag
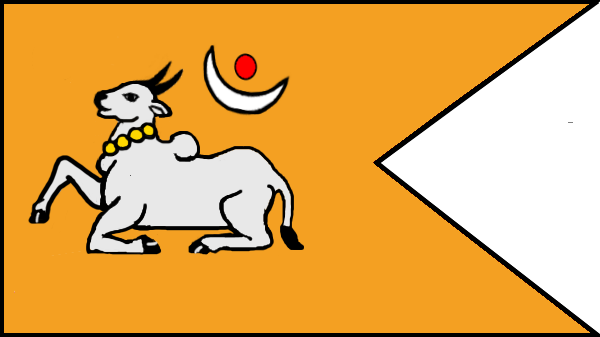

Siva Senai /ˈsɪvə sɛnɑː/ (Tamil: சிவா சேனை, romanized: Civā cēṉai, lit. 'Army of Shiva') is a Hindu nationalist political group in Sri Lanka formed to protect the interests of Sri Lankan Tamil Hindus. The group was founded on 12 October 2016. Maravanpulavu Sachchithananthan, a former United Nations official, is the founder of the group, which has received encouragement from the Indian political party Shiv Sena. Siva Senai spearheaded an initiative in December 2017 to allow Sri Lankan pilgrims to visit Chidambaram in Tamil Nadu, India. The group has also actively advocated against cattle slaughter in Sri Lanka.

In 2018, supporters of Siva Senai held protests in Jaffna against cattle slaughter. It also protested against Muslim teachers in Hindu schools wearing Abaya, believing it to be an attempt of Islamisation of Hindus.
