= Keheliya Rambukwella =

Sri Lankan politician

Hon. Keheliya Rambukwella MP

Minister of Environment
- In office 23 October 2023 – 3 February 2024
- President: Ranil Wickremesinghe
- Prime Minister: Dinesh Gunawardena
- Preceded by: Naseer Ahamed Zainulabdeen
- Succeeded by: Vijitha Herath

Minister of Health
- In office 20 May 2022 – 23 October 2023
- President: Gotabaya Rajapaksa; Ranil Wickremesinghe
- Prime Minister: Ranil Wickremesinghe; Dinesh Gunawardena
- Preceded by: Channa Jayasumana
- Succeeded by: Ramesh Pathirana
- In office 16 August 2021 – 3 April 2022
- President: Gotabaya Rajapaksa
- Prime Minister: Mahinda Rajapaksa
- Preceded by: Pavithra Wanniarachchi
- Succeeded by: Channa Jayasumana

Minister of Water Supply and Drainage
- In office 23 May 2022 – 19 January 2023
- President: Gotabaya Rajapaksa
- Prime Minister: Ranil Wickremesinghe
- Preceded by: Mohan Priyadarshana De Silva
- Succeeded by: Jeevan Thondaman

Minister of Mass Media
- In office 12 August 2020 – 16 August 2021
- President: Gotabaya Rajapaksa
- Prime Minister: Mahinda Rajapaksa
- Preceded by: Bandula Gunawardena
- Succeeded by: Dullas Alahapperuma
- In office 23 April 2010 – 12 January 2015
- President: Mahinda Rajapaksa
- Prime Minister: D. M. Jayaratne
- Preceded by: Jeewan Kumaranatunga
- Succeeded by: Gayantha Karunathilaka

Minister of Foreign Employment Promotion and Welfare
- In office 28 January 2007 – 23 April 2010
- President: Mahinda Rajapaksa
- Prime Minister: Ratnasiri Wickremanayake; D. M. Jayaratne
- Preceded by: Athauda Seneviratne
- Succeeded by: Dilan Perera

State Minister of Investment Promotions
- In office 27 November 2019 – 12 August 2020
- President: Gotabaya Rajapaksa
- Prime Minister: Mahinda Rajapaksa

State Minister of Mass Media and Digital Infrastructure
- In office 4 November 2018 – 15 December 2018
- President: Gotabaya Rajapaksa
- Prime Minister: Mahinda Rajapaksa

Member of Parliament for Kandy District
- In office 18 October 2000 – 24 September 2024

Personal details
- Born: 21 September 1954 (age 72) Kegalle, Dominion of Ceylon
- Party: Sri Lanka Podujana Peramuna (since 2021); Sri Lanka Freedom Party (2006–2021); United National Party (before 2006)
- Spouse: Kusum Priyadarshini Epa
- Children: 4
- Education: St. Thomas' College, Mount Lavinia
- Profession: Hotelier

Keheliya Rambukwella (Sinhala:කෙහෙලිය රඹුක්වැල්ල, Tamil:கெஹெலிய ரம்புக்வெல; born 21 September 1954) is a Sri Lankan politician, hotelier, film producer and former cabinet minister. He has served in multiple ministerial posts, including the Minister of Mass Media and Information, Minister of Foreign Employment Promotion and Welfare, Minister of Water Supply and Drainage, Minister of Health and Minister of Environment.

== Early life ==
Rambukwella was born and raised in Kegalle and received his education at St. Thomas' College, Mount Lavinia. He is a professional hotelier, with a post graduate degree from the Hotel School. He holds a doctorate in Defense Studies. In 1979, Rambukwella became the youngest film producer in Sri Lanka, after producing his own Sinhala movie, Sakvithi Suvaya, featuring Gamini Fonseka in the lead role. His son, Ramith Rambukwella, is a national cricket player.

== Political career ==
Rambukwella claims that he was introduced to politics by Gamini Dissanayake when the UNP split under President Ranasinghe Premadasa. Keheliya joined the Democratic United National Front (DUNF) led by Lalith Athulathmudali. He later joined the United National Party and was elected to the parliament from the Kandy District in 2000, winning 154,403 preferential votes. In 2001, Rambukwella was reelected to the parliament.

In 2007, Rambukwella crossed over from the opposition to the government of President Mahinda Rajapaksa, and joined the Sri Lanka Freedom Party (SLFP). Rambukwella made an attempt to cross back to the UNP in 2015, however this attempt failed and he was forced to remain with Rajapaksa's faction of the SLFP, which ended up losing the 2015 election.

== Controversies ==
=== Accident and government grant ===
In February 2012, Rambukwella claimed to have "jumped" from the balcony of a third-floor hotel room in Melbourne with the intention of reaching his companion, injuring his legs. After receiving a direct aid of Rs. 20 million from the President's Fund to cover his medical expenses, he swiftly recovered from his injuries.

=== Immunoglobulin scandal ===
In October 2023, the National Medicines Regulatory Authority (NMRA) revealed that forged documents were submitted for Customs clearance to procure a batch of vials containing human immunoglobulin, which failed quality tests. It was claimed to have been produced by Livealth Biopharma Pvt Ltd, India, and imported by Isolez Biotech Pharma AG (Pvt) Ltd. However, the Indian manufacturer informed the NMRA that they did not manufacture or export the immunoglobulin batch. Around Rs. 130 million was believed to have been misappropriated. On 2 February 2024, Rambukwella was arrested by criminal investigators in Colombo alongside former Secretary to the Ministry of Health Janaka Chandragupta and remanded until 15 February. He resigned from his ministerial post on 3 February following public pressure.

=== Arrest and indictment ===
In June 2025, Rambukwella was indicted along with 11 others in connection with the procurement of substandard human immunoglobulin antibody drugs. The Attorney General filed the indictment before the Colombo Permanent High Court-at-Bar.

=== Family involvement and bail conditions ===
In June 2025, Rambukwella's wife, Kusum Priyadarshini Epa, and daughter, Chandula Ramali Rambukwella, were briefly remanded after failing to fulfill bail conditions in connection with the immunoglobulin scandal.

=== Additional corruption cases ===
Rambukwella and his family members are also facing additional corruption cases, including allegations of misusing public funds for personal gain. These cases are currently under investigation, and further legal proceedings are expected.

On 27 March 2026, the Supreme Court of Sri Lanka ruled that Rambukwella along with several others, had violated the fundamental rights of the public by procuring health supplies in breach of standard procurement procedures in 2022 under the Indian credit line. He was ordered to pay Rs. 75 million (approximately US$239,000) to the state, while the others were ordered to pay varying amounts. The fundamental rights petition was filed by Transparency International Sri Lanka and two other parties.
