= R. A. Chandrasena =

R. A. Chandrasena ආර්. ඒ. චන්ද්‍රසේන

Background information
- Birth name: Ranasinghe Arachchige Chandrasena Perera
- Also known as: Chandrasena Master
- Born: 27 August 1924; Mahanuvara Kandy, British Ceylon
- Origin: Sri Lanka
- Died: 1 March 1980 (aged 55); Colombo, Sri Lanka
- Genres: Sri Lankan music, Folk music, Raga, Film, Radio and
- Occupations: Musician, singer, music director
- Years active: 1924–1980
- Labels: RAC and Shrimath
- Website: http://chandrasenamusic.com
- notable works: Chandrasena Sangeethayathanaya, Gramophone Record Venture of RAC and Shrimath labels

R. A. Chandrasena (Sinhala: ආර්. ඒ. චන්ද්‍රසේන) was a Sri Lankan musician who earned his reputation as a highly talented and gifted artist and also by his contribution to the Sri Lankan music discipline and the industry during 1940–1980.

He commenced his career when he was twelve years old in late 1930s at his entry to the musical programmes in Radio Ceylon (now known as Sri Lanka Broadcasting Corporation) with his gifted talents in playing many musical instruments whatever came to his hands. Notably, excelling in keyboard instruments such as harmonium, piano accordion, piano, organ and also the oriental instruments such as tabla, mandolin and violin.

Chandrasena established his institute of music in December 1951 and titled it as Chandrasena Sangeethaayathanaya (Chandrasena Institute of Music). This institute turned out be the stepping stone for many musicians in that era and in the subsequent generation. R A Chandrasena provided his expertise, knowledge and mentorship to many artists in a humble and relentless manner during his lifetime.

In 1969, Chandrasena launched a gramophone record company by which 45 RPM EP records were issued to the Sri Lankan Sinhala songs market under the labels of RAC and Shrimath. All the songs in these records were composed and music directed by R A Chandrasena and he managed to use the talents of many professional singers and lyrics writers effectively in these master pieces.

During his relatively short life, he achieved reputations as a professional composer, a singer, a drama/film music director, a music teacher and more over as a mentor for many musicians and artists at the early stages of their professional path, especially in refining their talents. Among the many, the key personalities who were well coached and mentored by Chandrasena are Dharmadasa Walpola (1949), Guruge Khemadasa Perera, later known as Premasiri Khemadasa (1953), and Victor Ratnayake (1962).

== Life in brief (1924–1980) ==
Chandrasena was born on 27 August 1924 in Mahanuvara, much known as Kandy, in central Sri Lanka to a Sinhala Buddhist family. At birth, he was named as Ranasinghe Arachchige Chandrasena Perera. His parents were Ranasinghe Arachchige Jeiris Perera and Selesthina Dias Abeysinghe whose generations had been from Mahanuwara. Chandrasena was the third child of the eleven children in the family. His father was not a musician by profession, but a highly talented musician whose exposure could have influenced Chandrasena to admire music since his childhood.

Chandrasena was educated at Sri Rahula college in Kandy, Prince College in Kotahena and Sri Dharmaloka College in Keleniya. He had the privilege of being mentored by Ananda Samarakoon at Prince College, D B Dhanapala and C M Weerartne at Sri Dharmaloka College. D B Dhanapala was the principal at Sri Dharmaloka College who later became a veteran journalist in Sri Lanka and the Editor-in-Chief at DAVASA newspaper founded in 1961 by M. D. Gunasena and Company, Sri Lanka. C. M. Weeraratne was a teacher at Sri Dharmaloka College who later became the Vice Principal of Ananda College. Further, Chandrasena was also mentored and well supported by U A S Perera, well known as Siri Ayya in his children musical programmes at Radio Ceylon.

1946-Sriyani Chandrasena

In 1943, Chandrasena met a young talented singer, named Mohoppu Arachchige Shriyaawathie Perera, who was later known as Sriyani Chandrasena, at an audition programme that was conducted at Radio Ceylon. They got married on 26 July 1946. Sriyani had a brief career as a singer, but largely, she became the devoted lifetime supporting partner for Chandrasena in all his musical creations and events throughout. They had three children: Thilangani, Lalith and Darshani.

R A Chandrasena died in the early hours of 1 March 1980, after a brief heart illness. Sriyani continued Chandrasena's vision and the practice at Chandrasena Sangeethaanayathanaya and prepared the youngest daughter Darshani Chandrasena Perera in the music profession. Darshani was graduated in music at the Faculty of Esthetic Studies at University of Kelaniya, Sri Lanka, and became a teaching professional in music.

Sriyani Chandrasena died on 4 August 2009.

== Discography ==
=== Music director ===
Year	Film	Songs	Lyricist	Recording Studio
1954	Ayiraanganee	තරු පායන ආකාසේ - රුක්මණී සහ මොහිදීන් බෙග් (WN 550)	A. J. D. SOYSA	Madras Citadel Studio - India
1954	Ayiraanganee	ප්‍රීති වන්නේ ජීවිතේමයි - රුක්මණී දේවි - (WN 550)	A. J. D. SOYSA	Madras Citadel Studio - India
1954	Ayiraanganee	සී පද - රුක්මණී දේවි (WN 551)	A. J. D. SOYSA	Madras Citadel Studio - India
1954	Ayiraanganee	හඳ වාගේ මෝරා - එඩී ජයමාන්න සහ මේබල් බ්ලයිත් (WN 553)	A. J. D. SOYSA	Madras Citadel Studio - India
1954	Ayiraanganee	ලෝ ජීවන කතරේ - මොහිදීන් බෙග්	A. J. D. SOYSA	Madras Citadel Studio - India
1954	Ayiraanganee	මහද රාණී - මේල් බ්ලයිත් (WN 553)	A. J. D. SOYSA	Madras Citadel Studio - India
1954	Ayiraanganee	දුප්පතාගේ සෑම - රුක්මණී දේවී (WN 549)	A. J. D. SOYSA	Madras Citadel Studio - India
1954	Ayiraanganee	රාණීයෙන්කෝ - මොහිදීන් බෙග් සහ රුක්මණී (WN 551)	A. J. D. SOYSA	Madras Citadel Studio - India
1954	Ayiraanganee	රස කිරි පොවා-රුක්මණී දේවි	A. J. D. SOYSA	Madras Citadel Studio - India
1954	Ayiraanganee	මල් වාගේ දිලිසෙනා - එඩී ජයමාන්න (WN 552)	A. J. D. SOYSA	Madras Citadel Studio - India
1954	Ayiraanganee	ප්‍රීති පීතී අපි දෙන්නා - එඩී ජයමාන්න සහ මේබල් (WN 552)	A. J. D. SOYSA	Madras Citadel Studio - India
1954	Ayiraanganee	කාසියෙහි ආලේ	A. J. D. SOYSA	Madras Citadel Studio - India
1955	Mathabedaya	පෙම් සීන ලෝකේ මායා - මොහිදීන් බෙග් සහ රුක්මණී දේවී	A. J. D. SOYSA	Madras Film Central - India
1955	Mathabedaya	සමුදුරේ සොයා - රුක්මණී දේවී සහ සූර්ය රාණී	A. J. D. SOYSA	Madras Film Central - India
1955	Mathabedaya	දෙවියන්කෝ සමන් දෙවියන් - රුක්මණී දේවී	A. J. D. SOYSA	Madras Film Central - India
1955	Mathabedaya	ගින්නෙකී හද මාගේ - මොහිදීන් බෙග් (WN580)	A. J. D. SOYSA	Madras Film Central - India
1955	Mathabedaya	ආදර පාන සුදා - රුක්මණී දේවී	A. J. D. SOYSA	Madras Film Central - India
1955	Mathabedaya	සම්පතකී සොඳ - සම්පතකී	A. J. D. SOYSA	Madras Film Central - India
1955	Mathabedaya	ලෝකේ සිනමාවකී - මේබල් බ්ලයිත්	A. J. D. SOYSA	Madras Film Central - India
1955	Mathabedaya	කැරකෙනවා මේ ලෝකේ - එඩී ජයමාන්න සහ මේබල් බ්ලයිත්	A. J. D. SOYSA	Madras Film Central - India
1955	Mathabedaya	සංගීත සාගරේ	A. J. D. SOYSA	Madras Film Central - India
1955	Mathabedaya	සිගාලයා	A. J. D. SOYSA	Madras Film Central - India
1955	Mathabedaya	පෙම් මල් මාලා - රුක්මණී දේවී සහ මොහිදීන් බෙග්	A. J. D. SOYSA	Madras Film Central - India
1956	Daiva Vipaakaya	සරා ගොයියා හරි මිනිහා - මේබල් බ්ලයිත්	A. J. D. SOYSA	Madras Film Central - India
1956	Daiva Vipaakaya	සුරතලියේ - මොහිදීන් බෙග් සහ ෂර්ලි බ්ලයිත්	A. J. D. SOYSA	Madras Film Central - India
1956	Daiva Vipaakaya	නීල අහසේ - ෂර්ලි බ්ලයිත්	A. J. D. SOYSA	Madras Film Central - India
1956	Daiva Vipaakaya	සාගර හිමිය සොයා - මොහිදීන් බෙග් සහ ෂර්ලි බ්ලයිත්	A. J. D. SOYSA	Madras Film Central - India
1956	Daiva Vipaakaya	සුදෝ සුදු රන් - මොහිදීන් බෙග්	A. J. D. SOYSA	Madras Film Central - India
1956	Daiva Vipaakaya	දොයි දොයි දොයි පුත - මේබල් බ්ලයිත් (WN 580)	A. J. D. SOYSA	Madras Film Central - India
1956	Daiva Vipaakaya	දන්වා ලෝකේ - මොහිදීන් බෙග්	A. J. D. SOYSA	Madras Film Central - India
1956	Daiva Vipaakaya	සංගීත සාගරේ	A. J. D. SOYSA	Madras Film Central - India
1956	Daiva Vipaakaya	ජාතික කලා රසේ - සමූහ	A. J. D. SOYSA	Madras Film Central - India
1956	Daiva Vipaakaya	දෙව් ලොවේ මහා - ෂර්ලි බ්ලයිත්	A. J. D. SOYSA	Madras Film Central - India
1958	Vedi Bima	ප්‍රේම දයාබර සුකොමලියා - ශ්‍රී ලාල් සහ සුජාතා පෙරේරා	Adanda Samarakoon	Lanka Chithragaraya - Narahenpita, Sri Lanka
1958	Vedi Bima	සිරි සාර සුරම්‍ය වු - හරූන් ලන්ත්‍රා සහ චන්ද්‍රා ද සිල්වා පිරිස	Adanda Samarakoon	Lanka Chithragaraya - Narahenpita, Sri Lanka
1958	Vedi Bima	පෙම් රාණී සසසුරම් - හරූන් ලන්ත්‍රා සහ සුජාතා පෙරේරා	Adanda Samarakoon	Lanka Chithragaraya - Narahenpita, Sri Lanka
1958	Vedi Bima	නගර සමාජෙන් දුරුවී - මොහිදීන් බෙග් සහ පිරිස	Adanda Samarakoon	Lanka Chithragaraya - Narahenpita, Sri Lanka
1958	Vedi Bima	හේ රාමා - ධර්මදාස වල්පොල නැටුම් සංගීතයක්	Adanda Samarakoon	Lanka Chithragaraya - Narahenpita, Sri Lanka
1958	Vanaliya	වන මල ඔයාද-මේල් බ්ලයිත් සහ ෂර්ලි බ්ලයිත්(WN650)	A. J. D. SOYSA	Lanka Chithragaraya - Narahenpita, Sri Lanka
1958	Vanaliya	කරුණා ජලේ	A. J. D. SOYSA	Lanka Chithragaraya - Narahenpita, Sri Lanka
1958	Vanaliya	මවා ගිනි දැල්-ග්‍රේස් ජයමාන්න (WN648)	A. J. D. SOYSA	Lanka Chithragaraya - Narahenpita, Sri Lanka
1958	Vanaliya	මල් පිපීලා-ෂර්ලි බ්ලයිත්(WN649)	A. J. D. SOYSA	Lanka Chithragaraya - Narahenpita, Sri Lanka
1958	Vanaliya	දුප්පතාගේ ආණ්ඩුවයි මේ(WN649)	A. J. D. SOYSA	Lanka Chithragaraya - Narahenpita, Sri Lanka
1958	Vanaliya	වාසි වුනා මෙදා සැරේ-ෂර්ලි බ්ලයිත්(WN650)	A. J. D. SOYSA	Lanka Chithragaraya - Narahenpita, Sri Lanka
1958	Vanaliya	ආලෝකේ නසිනා-මොහිදීන් බෙග් (WN653)	A. J. D. SOYSA	Lanka Chithragaraya - Narahenpita, Sri Lanka
1958	Vanaliya	මේ දුෂ්ට සමාජේ-(WN653)	A. J. D. SOYSA	Lanka Chithragaraya - Narahenpita, Sri Lanka
1958	Vanaliya	මේ ලෝකේ මහා-මොහිදීන් බෙග් (WN652)	A. J. D. SOYSA	Lanka Chithragaraya - Narahenpita, Sri Lanka
1958	Vanaliya	ආදරේ බැඳුනා-මේබල් බ්ලයිත්(WN652)	A. J. D. SOYSA	Lanka Chithragaraya - Narahenpita, Sri Lanka
1966	Kolamba Hadayo	ජීවිතේ ජීවිතේ- ධර්මදාස වල්පොල	Karunaratne Abeysekara, Cyril A. Seelawimala	Sarasavi Studio - Dalugama, Sri Lanka
1966	Kolamba Hadayo	ආලෝකේ දීලා- ලතා වල්පොල	Karunaratne Abeysekara, Cyril A. Seelawimala	Sarasavi Studio - Dalugama, Sri Lanka
1966	Kolamba Hadayo	සුහද ලීලාව-ලතා සහ ධර්මදාස වල්පොල	Karunaratne Abeysekara, Cyril A. Seelawimala	Sarasavi Studio - Dalugama, Sri Lanka
1966	Kolamba Hadayo	ගිම්හානේ ආවා-ධර්මදාස වල්පොල	Karunaratne Abeysekara, Cyril A. Seelawimala	Sarasavi Studio - Dalugama, Sri Lanka
1966	Kolamba Hadayo	සුව සෙත ලෝ සත- මිල්ටන් පෙරේරා	Karunaratne Abeysekara, Cyril A. Seelawimala	Sarasavi Studio - Dalugama, Sri Lanka
1972	Miringuwa	ලස්සන මලකට- GSBරාණී පෙරේරා	Karunaratne Abeysekara, Cyril A. Seelawimala	Sarasavi Studio - Dalugama, Sri Lanka
1972	Miringuwa	දෙසඳුන් සුවඳ මැකී යයි - ලතා වල්පොල	Karunaratne Abeysekara, Cyril A. Seelawimala	Sarasavi Studio - Dalugama, Sri Lanka
1972	Miringuwa	මිහිලිය ගේ	Karunaratne Abeysekara, Cyril A. Seelawimala	Sarasavi Studio - Dalugama, Sri Lanka
1972	Miringuwa	සැංගීලා වන මල් මාලා - ලතා සහ ධර්මදාස වල්පොල	Karunaratne Abeysekara, Cyril A. Seelawimala	Sarasavi Studio - Dalugama, Sri Lanka
1972	Miringuwa	සීත මද නලේ - ලතා සහ ධර්මදාස වල්පොල	Karunaratne Abeysekara, Cyril A. Seelawimala	Sarasavi Studio - Dalugama, Sri Lanka
1972	Miringuwa	කිරි අයියේ - GSB රාණී පෙරේරා සහ	Karunaratne Abeysekara, Cyril A. Seelawimala	Sarasavi Studio - Dalugama, Sri Lanka

== As a singer ==
Chandrasena's singing voice became much heard and popular by the famous song "Dasabaladhari Budu Raju Pera Kala" in 1948 March. This was the theme song of the stage drama Sanda Kinduri that was produced by Vasantha Kumara, a well reputed oriental dancer. The lyrics of the song was done by S L Kakulawela who later became the first Professor of Linguistics in Sri Lanka, and the Vice Chancellor of the University of Kelaniya. The lyrics was based on the story of a previous life (Chanda Kinnara Jaathakaya) of Gautama Buddha during which he was born as a mermaid species in the Himalayan mountain range in India. This song was composed by R A Chandrasena himself and this was supposed to be his first ever melody. This is still a well known and much respected song in the Sri Lankan music. The song was later reproduced and sung by his grandson Harshadewa Ariyasinghe on 23 May 2013.
