= Batuwatta =

Batuwatta බටුවත්ත பட்டுவத்தை
- Suburb
- Location within Sri Lanka
- Coordinates: 7°3′10″N 79°56′5″E
- Country: Sri Lanka
- Province: Western Province
- Time zone: UTC+5:30 (Sri Lanka Standard Time Zone)

Batuwatta is a town situated approximately 4 km from the town of Ganemulla, in the Gampaha District of Sri Lanka. It belongs to the Ja-Ela Electoral District.
