= Ministry of Water Supply (Sri Lanka) =

Government ministry of Sri Lanka

- ජලසම්පාදන අමාත්‍යාංශය நீர்வழங்கல் அமைச்சு

Ministry overview
- Formed: 2007
- Jurisdiction: Government of Sri Lanka
- Headquarters: Lakdiya Medura, 35 New Parliament road, Pelawatta, Battaramulla; 6.890600°N 79.926159°E
- Annual budget: LKR 35.4 billion
- Minister responsible: Jeevan Thondaman, Minister of Water Supply
- Ministry executive: Dr.(Eng.) Priyath B.Wickrama, Ministry Secretary
- Child agencies: National Water Supply and Drainage Board; Department of National Community Water Supply
- Website: mcpws.gov.lk

The Ministry of Water Supply (Sinhala: ජලසම්පාදන අමාත්‍යාංශය, romanized: jalasampādana amātyāṁśaya; Tamil: நீர்வழங்கல் அமைச்சு, romanized: Nīrvaḻaṅkal amaiccu) is a cabinet ministry of the Government of Sri Lanka responsible for the supply of water and maintenance of water and sanitation infrastructure.

== List of ministers ==
Minister of Water Supply
- Incumbent; Jeevan Thondaman since 19 Jan 2023
- Appointer: President of Sri Lanka
- Formation: 12 August 2020
- Website: mwsd.gov.lk

Parties

Sri Lanka Freedom Party Sri Lanka Podujana Peramuna Mahajana Eksath Peramuna Sri Lanka Muslim Congress Ceylon Workers' Congress

Name	Party	Tenure	President
Dinesh Gunawardena	Mahajana Eksath Peramuna	23 April 2010 - 9 January 2015	Mahinda Rajapaksa
Rauff Hakeem	Sri Lanka Muslim Congress	12 January 2015 - 15 November 2019	Maithripala Sirisena
Mahinda Rajapaksa	Sri Lanka Podujana Peramuna	22 November 2019 - 12 August 2020	Gotabaya Rajapaksa
Vasudeva Nanayakkara	Democratic Left Front	12 August 2020 -	Gotabaya Rajapaksa
Keheliya Rambukwella	Sri Lanka Podujana Peramuna	23 May 2022 - 19 January 2023	Gotabaya Rajapaksa
Jeevan Thondaman	Ceylon Workers' Congress	19 January 2023 - current	Ranil Wickramasinghe

== See also ==
- List of ministries of Sri Lanka
