= Jeevan Thondaman =

Sri Lankan politician (born 1994)

Hon. Jeevan Thondaman MP
- ஜீவன் தொண்டமான் ජීවන් තොණ්ඩමන්

Minister of Water Supply and Estate Infrastructure
- In office 19 January 2023 – 23 September 2024
- President: Ranil Wickremesinghe
- Prime Minister: Dinesh Gunawardena
- Preceded by: Keheliya Rambukwella
- Succeeded by: Vijitha Herath

Minister of State for Estate Housing and Community Infrastructure
- In office 12 August 2020 – 3 April 2022
- President: Gotabaya Rajapaksa
- Prime Minister: Mahinda Rajapaksa
- Succeeded by: A. Aravind Kumar

Member of the Parliament of Sri Lanka
- Incumbent
- Assumed office 20 August 2020
- Constituency: Nuwara Eliya District

Personal details
- Born: 9 November 1994 (age 31)
- Party: Ceylon Workers' Congress
- Other political affiliations: New Democratic Front (since 2024); Sri Lanka People's Freedom Alliance (2019–2022)
- Spouse: Sithai Sri Nachchiyar (m. 2025)
- Relations: Savumiamoorthy Thondaman (great grandfather); Arumugam Thondaman (father); Senthil Thondaman (cousin)
- Education: Northumbria University

Jeevan Kumaravel Thondaman (Tamil: ஜீவன் குமாரவேல் தொண்டமான்; born 9 November 1994) is a Sri Lankan politician, Member of Parliament and former cabinet minister.

== Early life and education ==
Thondaman was born on 9 November 1994 into a prominent political family. He is the son of Arumugam Thondaman and the great-grandson of Savumiamoorthy Thondaman, both of whom were leaders of the Ceylon Workers' Congress (CWC) and government ministers. He was educated at Gateway Primary School, Colombo, Lady Andal, Chennai and Chinmaya International Residential School, Coimbatore. Thondaman later pursued higher education at Northumbria University, where he graduated with a Bachelor of Laws (LLB) degree in 2017.

== Political career ==
After completing his education, Thondaman initially interned at a law firm in London before returning to Sri Lanka to assist his father in political and trade union work. In December 2017, a court order was issued to arrest him in connection with an assault of a National Union of Workers (NUW) supporter at a funeral in Maskeliya.

In June 2020, following the death of his father, Thondaman was appointed general secretary of the CWC. At the funeral of his father, Thondaman faced criticism for allegedly using the funeral procession as a political campaign, violating election and quarantine laws during the COVID-19 pandemic. The Centre for Monitoring Election Violence (CMEV) accused him of parading through multiple electorates in an open vehicle, while election authorities remained silent. The five-day funeral, which drew large crowds, was condemned by professional bodies like the GMOA, which warned of a potential second wave of COVID-19, and the Public Health Inspectors' Union, which threatened legal action if the event caused a new infection cluster.

He contested the 2020 parliamentary election as a Sri Lanka People's Freedom Alliance candidate in the Nuwara Eliya District and was successfully elected to the Parliament of Sri Lanka. After the election, he was appointed State Minister of Estate Housing and Community Infrastructure, becoming Sri Lanka's youngest cabinet minister at the age of 26.

During the 2024 national Thai Pongal celebrations in Hatton, Thondaman faced criticism for inviting prominent South Indian actresses, including Aishwarya Rajesh and Samyuktha Menon amid national austerity measures. Political opponents, such as Letchumanar Sanjay of the Samagi Jana Balawegaya (SJB), deemed the lavish event inappropriate given ongoing local economic hardships, including student dropouts and food insecurity, and questioned the use of taxpayer funds. Thondaman defended his actions, emphasizing the festival's cultural significance and the potential economic benefits of attracting tourism through celebrity participation.

In April 2024, Thondaman was recognized as a Young Global Leader by the World Economic Forum. He was the first Sri Lankan minister to receive this honour, in acknowledgement of his work in improving access to clean water and his initiatives to improve living conditions for marginalized communities.

In May 2024, Thondaman became embroiled in a legal controversy involving the Pedro Tea Factory, owned by Kelani Valley Plantations PLC, after allegedly entering the facility with supporters, threatening management, and detaining the CEO to demand the reinstatement of suspended workers. The Nuwara Eliya Magistrate's Court issued an arrest order, but when Thondaman surrendered on 29 July 2024, the court refrained from arresting him due to incomplete investigations. The Planters' Association strongly condemned his actions, calling for accountability in the plantation sector.

== Personal life ==
Thondaman married Sithai Sri Nachchiyar on 23 November 2025 at Arumugam Pillai Seethai Ammal College in Tiruppattur, Tamil Nadu, India.

== Electoral history ==
Electoral history of Jeevan Thondaman
Election	Constituency	Party	Alliance	Votes	Result
2020 parliamentary	Nuwara Eliya District	CWC	SLPFA	109,155	Elected
2024 parliamentary	Nuwara Eliya District	CWC	UNP	46,438	Elected
