= Sripal Silva =

Sri Lankan cricketer (1961–2020)

Sripal Silva (10 February 1961 – 27 February 2020) was a Sri Lankan cricketer. He was a right-handed batsman and a right-arm bowler who played for Moratuwa Sports Club.

Silva was born and died in Moratuwa. He played for Sri Lankan schools in the late 1970s and excelled in club cricket. In the 1979 season, he took 97 wickets with his pace bowling. He claimed 587 wickets for SSC, Saracens, Moratuwa SC and Panadura SC in 135 matches. He joined Bank of Ceylon in 1981, played for them and became its secretary.

Silva made a single first-class appearance for the side, during the 1995–96 season, against Galle. From the lower order, he scored a duck in the only innings in which he batted. He bowled 9 overs in the match, taking figures of 1-26.

Silva died on February 27, 2020, from the injuries that he had sustained in a motor accident, after being bed-ridden for a time.
