= Samanala Dam =

Samanala Dam සමනලවැව වේල්ල
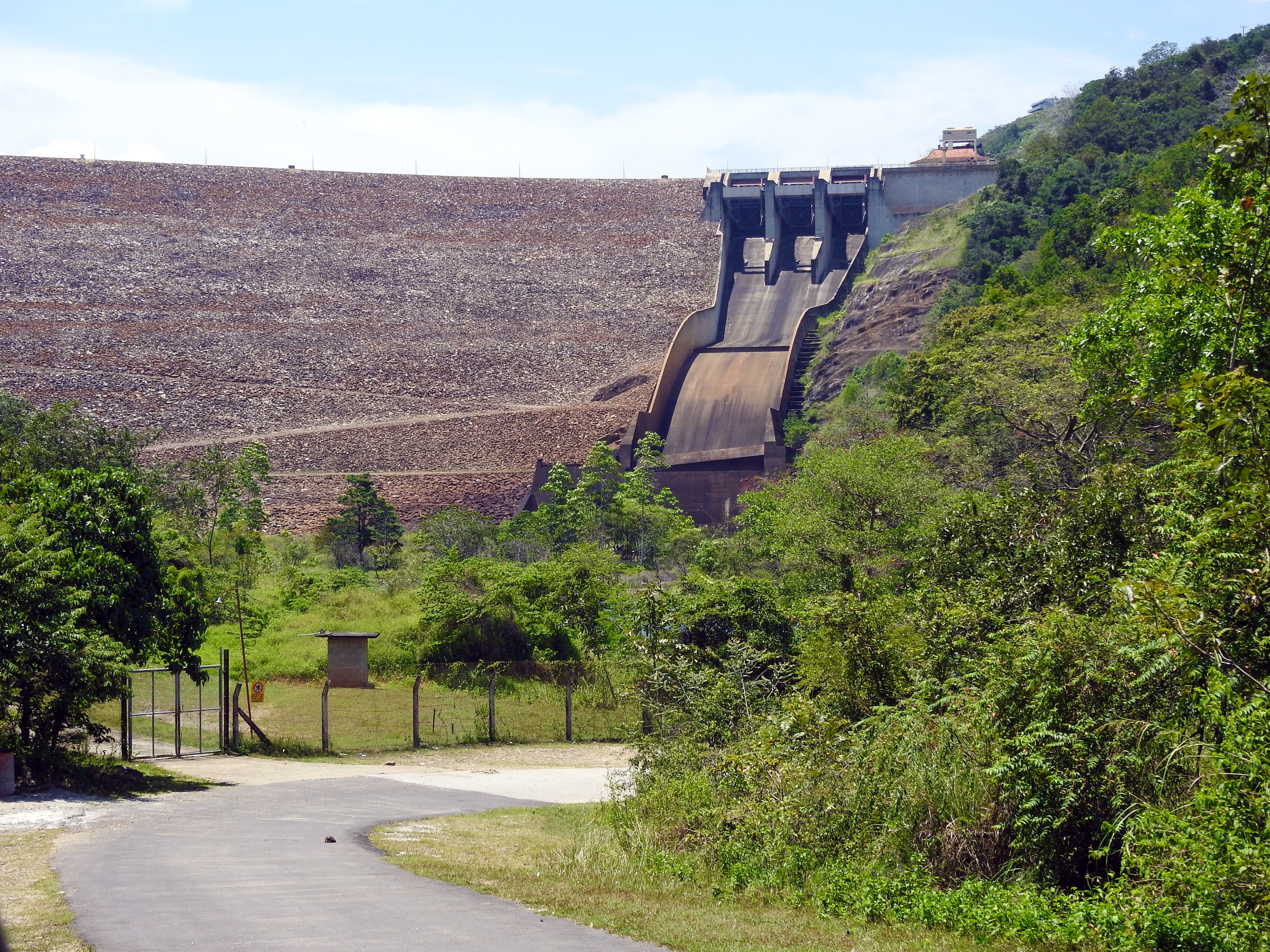

- Location within Sri Lanka
- Country: Sri Lanka
- Location: Balangoda
- Coordinates: 06°40′48″N 80°47′54″E
- Purpose: Power
- Status: Operational
- Construction began: 1986
- Opening date: 1992
- Construction cost: ¥74,313 million

Dam and spillways
- Type of dam: Embankment dam
- Impounds: Walawe River
- Height (foundation): 110 m (361 ft)
- Length: 530 m (1,739 ft)
- Spillway capacity: 3,600 m^{3}/s (130,000 cu ft/s)

Reservoir
- Creates: Samanala Reservoir
- Total capacity: 218,000,000 m^{3} (7.7×10^{9} ft^{3})
- Catchment area: 372 km^{2} (144 mi^{2})

Power Station
- Coordinates: 06°35′03″N 80°48′29″E
- Operator: Ceylon Electricity Board
- Turbines: 2 × 62 MW
- Installed capacity: 124 MW
- Annual generation: 405 GWh

The Samanala Dam (Sinhala: සමනලවැව වේල්ල) is a dam primarily used for hydroelectric power generation in Sri Lanka. Commissioned in 1992, the Samanalawewa Project (Samanala Reservoir Project) is the third-largest hydroelectric scheme in the country, producing 405 GWh of energy annually. It was built with financial support from Japan and the United Kingdom. It is notable for a large leak on its right bank. Power production continues as planned despite the leakage, and the water from the leak now provides two thirds of the water issued by the reservoir for agriculture in downstream areas.

== Location ==
The Samanala Dam is located in the Uda Walawe basin. It was built at the confluence of the Walawe river and the Belihul Oya, a location 400 metres (1,300 ft) above mean sea level. It is near the town of Balangoda, 160 kilometres (99 mi) southeast of the capital Colombo. The ground of the project area is karstic.

== Background and development ==
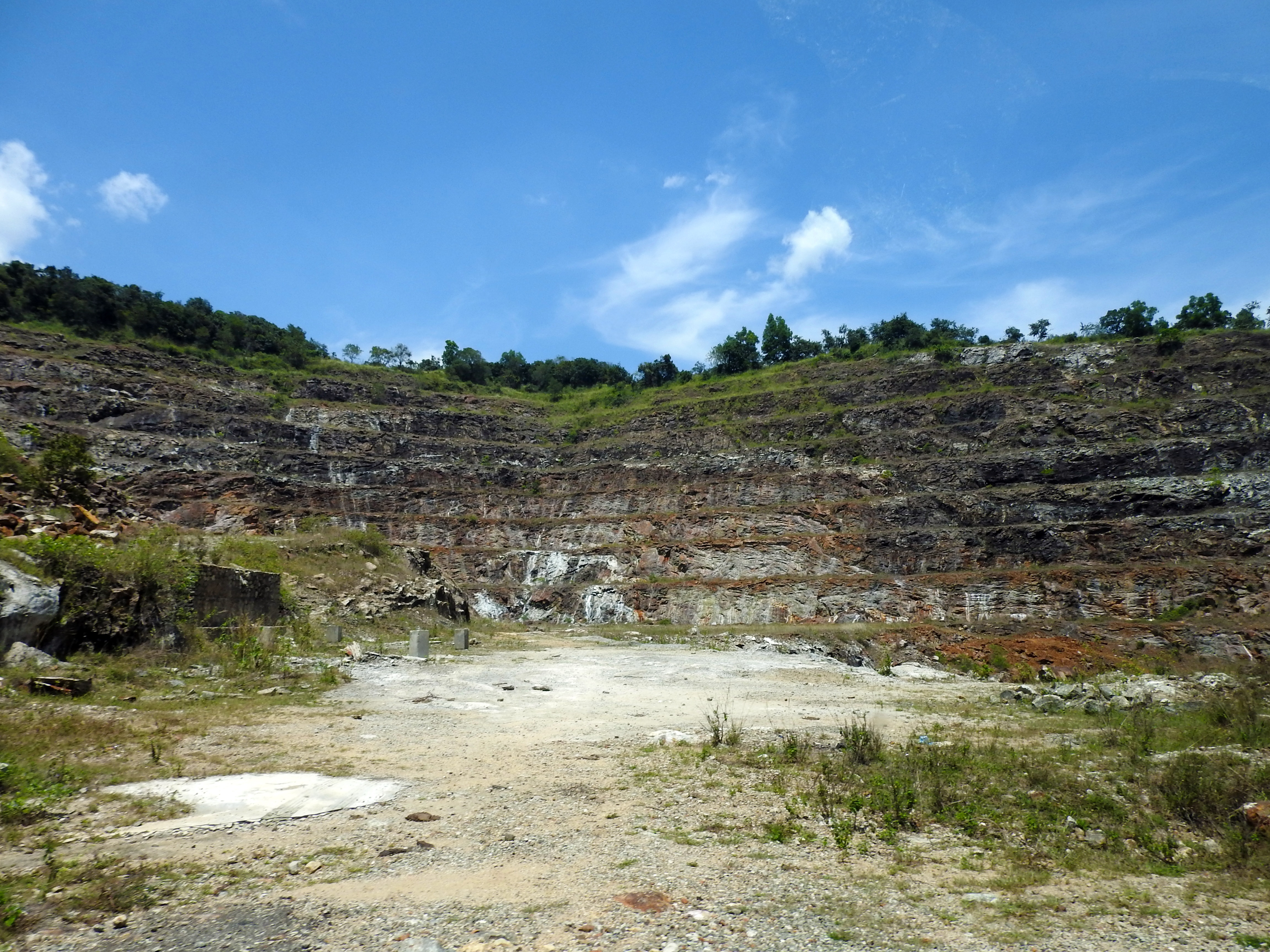
Quarry site.

With the Mahaweli and Laxapana hydroelectric power projects implemented, the demand for electricity in Sri Lanka rapidly increased. When it became clear that it would not be possible to meet the demand with coal-fired power plants, the government of Sri Lanka decided to initiate another hydroelectric power project. A reservoir type hydroelectric power plant was planned to be constructed across the Walawe river, which would address the shortage of electricity in the country. Detailed investigations for a hydroelectric power plant in this area have been carried out since 1958, but the scheme was initiated only in 1986. The financing for the project was given by the governments of Japan and the United Kingdom.

Sir Alexander Gibb & Partners did the design work and Balfour Beatty were the contracts to lay roads, drive a tunnel and build the power station.

The cost of the project was estimated to be 60,176 million yen, but with the remedial measures taken to control the leak, the cost increased to 74,313 million yen. The Samanalawewa power plant was commissioned in 1992. The Samanalawewa project is the second largest hydroelectric scheme in Sri Lanka after the Mahaweli project.

== Dam, reservoir and the power station ==
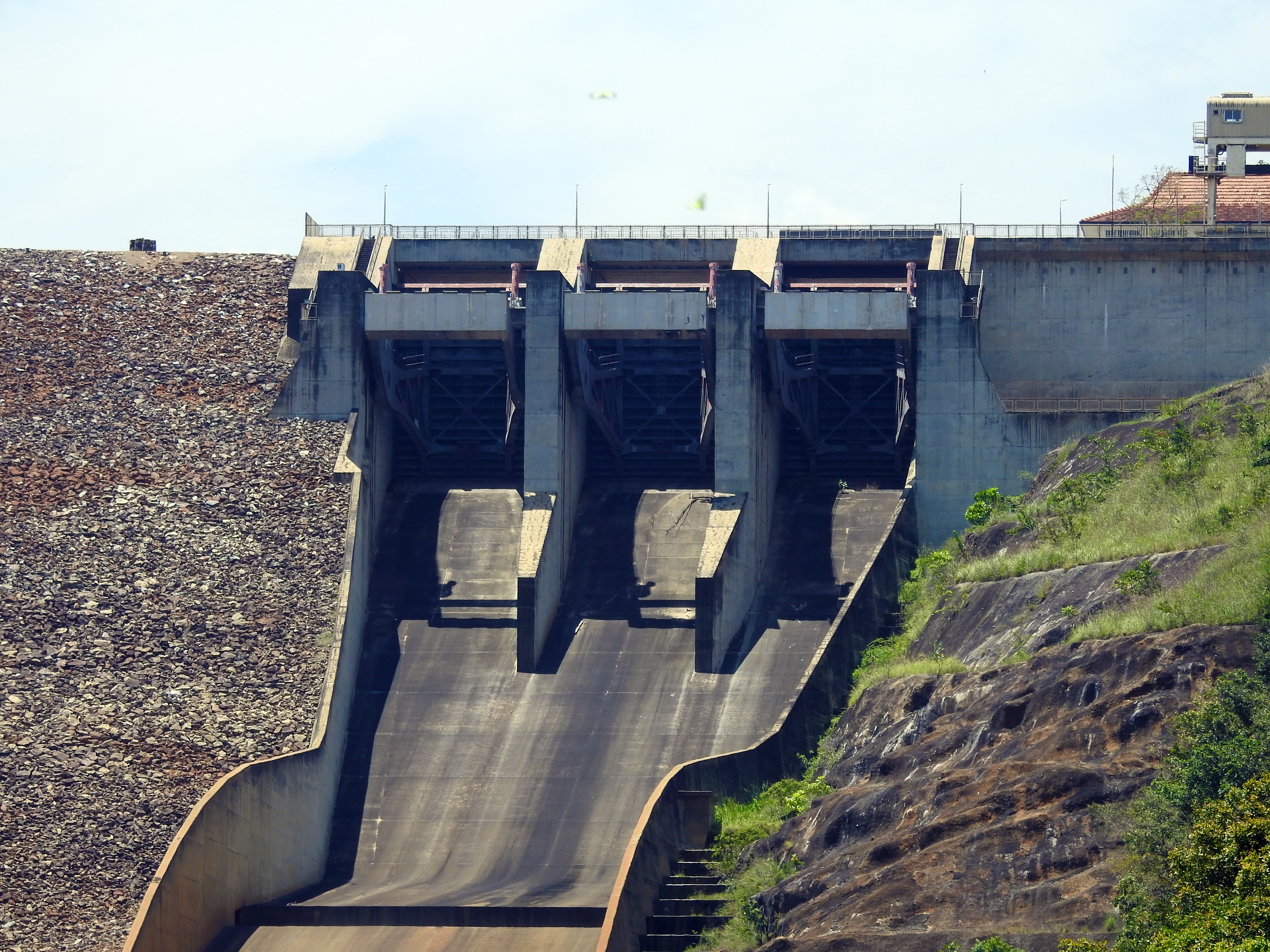
The dam and spillway

The Samanala Dam is 110 metres (360 ft) in height and has a length of 530 metres (1,740 ft) at crest level. The volume of the dam is about 4,500,000 cubic metres (160,000,000 ft^{3}). Rainfall in the area has an annual average of 2,867 millimetres (112.9 in), and the catchment area is 372 square kilometres (144 mi^{2}). The dam is of rock fill, central earth core type. The spillway of the dam has three gates, each 14 metres (46 ft) high and 11 metres (36 ft) wide. It can discharge water at a rate of 3,600 cubic metres (130,000 ft^{3}) per second. Its tunnel is 4.5 metres (15 ft) in diameter and 5,159 metres (16,926 ft) in length.

The reservoir created by the dam has a total live storage capacity of 218,000,000 cubic metres (7.7×10^{9} ft^{3}). Its gross storage capacity is 278,000,000 cubic metres (9.8×10^{9} ft^{3}), of which 60,000,000 cubic metres (2.1×10^{9} ft^{3}) is dead storage. The reservoir's full supply level is 460 metres (1,510 ft) above main sea level, and the reservoir spreads 8 kilometres (5.0 mi) upstream at this level. The reservoir is u-shaped. It covers an area of 897 ha. However, with the water leakage the water level was reduced to 430 metres (1,410 ft). It is one of the largest reservoirs in Sri Lanka.

The power house contains two Francis turbines, each with a capacity of 62 MW, and generates 405 GWh of energy annually. The powerplant is managed by the Ceylon Electricity Board.

== Leak ==
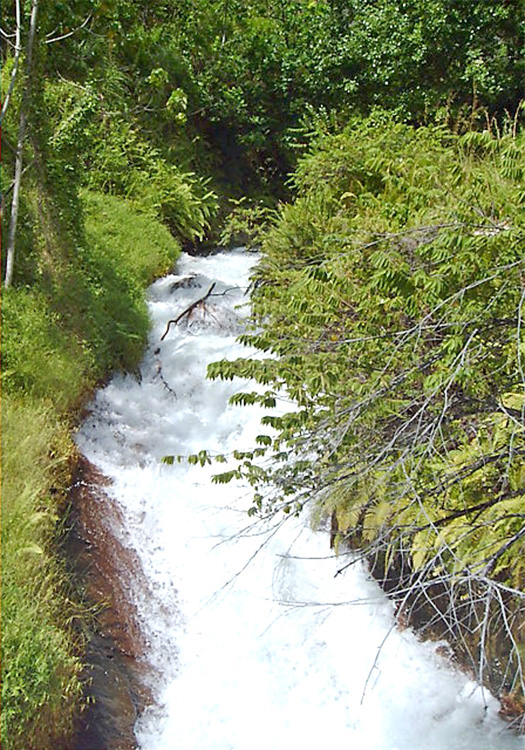
The leak from the Samanala Dam

A permeable area of ground was found during the construction of the dam in 1988. Curtain grouting was used in an effort to remedy this. However, as the reservoir was being filled, a large leak occurred on the side of the right bank, about 300 metres (980 ft) downstream from the dam, causing a landslip. Subsequent measures taken to control the leakage were largely ineffective. The leakage of approximately 2,100 litres (460 imp gal) per second continues, but has not affected power production at the plant, which has been in full operation since its commissioning in 1992.

The leak is constantly monitored. If the leak remains stable and does not increase further, it does not pose a threat to the sustainability of the project. The karstic ground has created complex geological conditions, and as a result the exact mechanism of the leak cannot be established, so remedial measures have been unsuccessful.

== Impact ==
The project was planned as a single purpose hydropower project. Therefore, the effects on the agriculture and the environment of the area were taken into consideration very little during the development. Although an irrigational release valve (IRV) is there in the dam to supply water to the farmlands in the downstream areas, the yield and cultivable acreage has declined since the Samanalawewa project was commissioned.

However, the necessity to constantly release water for agriculture in the downstream areas was reduced due to the leak. Of the water released from the Samanala Dam for agriculture in the downstream areas, two-thirds is from the leak and only one-third has to be supplied via the IRV.

== See also ==
- List of dams and reservoirs in Sri Lanka
- List of power stations in Sri Lanka
