= National Livestock Development Board =

Sri Lanka's largest state owned livestock and agricultural company

NLDB (National Livestock Development Board)
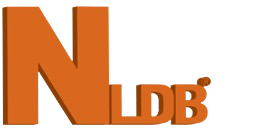
- NLDB logo
- Company type: private (state owned)
- Industry: Livestock, Food, Agriculture, and Research
- Founded: 1973
- Headquarters: No.40, Nawala Road, Colombo - 05, Sri Lanka
- Key people: Dr.B.C.S. Perera (Chairman)
- Brands: NLDB
- Total assets: ▼LKR90.billion(US$303.million) (2023)
- Subsidiaries: NLDB Farms; NLDB sales centers; NLDB banglows; NLDB distribution and processing centers
- Website: www.nldb.gov.lk

The National Livestock Development Board (NLDB) is a state-owned enterprise in Sri Lanka, managing 32 of the largest farms across the country. Spanning over 15,000 hectares, the NLDB focuses on livestock breeding, poultry production, integrated crop and livestock management, and value-added dairy products. With a stated mission to enhance rural livelihoods and support sustainable agriculture. The Board plays a pivotal role in advancing Sri Lanka's agricultural economy while addressing the diverse needs of farmers in various agro-climatic regions. The NLDB engages in diverse activities, including supplying breeding stock, maintaining and developing coconut plantations, producing value-added milk products, and training farmers in integrated crop and livestock management systems.

Currently, the NLDB owns approximately 15,000 hectares of land, making it the second-largest state-owned landholder in Sri Lanka. NLDB farms are utilized for various types of livestock, poultry, and agricultural activities. From 2019 to 2023, a deal was drafted by the previous administration to sell the NLDB to a joint venture of cargills and India's Amul. This plan was halted following the inauguration of the current anti-corruption government, the new president of Sri Lanka appointed a new chairman and an executive staff to revitalize the organization and steer it toward sustainable growth and national development.
