= Dhammika Ganganath Dissanayake =

Sri Lankan university professor, lecturer, and diplomat (1958–2020)

- ධම්මික ගංගානාත් දිසානායක
- Born: 1 July 1958; Kandy, Sri Lanka
- Died: 11 August 2020 (aged 62); Apeksha Hospital, Maharagama
- Resting place: Borella Cemetery
- Education: Dharmaraja College; University of Sri Jayawardenepura; Tokai University; Tsukuba University
- Occupations: Professor, lecturer, educator, diplomat
- Known for: Contributions to mass media
- Spouse: Saroja Dissanayake
- Children: 2
- Father: Wimalanath Dissanayake
- Awards: Mathshumaye Cultural Award (1993); Hidoyoshi Mimisu Award (1999)

Dhammika Ganganath Dissanayake (Sinhala: ධම්මික ගංගානාත් දිසානායක; 1 July 1958 – 11 August 2020), also known as Ganganath Dissanayake, was a Sri Lankan university professor, lecturer, academic and diplomat. He is known for his crucial contributions to mass media and has also authored numerous publications in the fields of mass communication, contemporary Sinhala cinema and politics. He served as an associate professor at the University of Sri Jayawardenepura and an ambassador of Sri Lanka to Japan.

== Personal life ==
Ganganath was born on 1 July 1958 in Kandy. His father, Wimalanath Dissanayake, was a film director and journalist.

Ganganath pursued his primary and secondary education at the Dharmaraja College in Kandy. He received his Bachelor of Arts degree on Japanese language from the University of Sri Jayawardenepura in 1982. In 1987, he went Japan to pursue a postgraduate degree, which he later obtained in Japanese. He completed his master's degree in mass communication at the Tsukuba University in 1990 and pursued a PhD degree from Tokai University in 1993.

He was married to Saroja Dissanayake. The couple has two daughters, Saki and Ruchi.

Ganganath died on 11 August 2020 at the age of 62 at the Apeksha Hospital in Maharagama due to cancer. His remains were kept at his residence at Sambuddhiwatte, Mattegoda for final rites. Funeral services were held at the Borella Public Cemetery on 13 August 2020.

== Career ==
Ganganath served as the head of the Department of Sinhala and Mass Media Academic Unit at the University of Sri Jayawardenepura from 2010 to 2013. He has also been the coordinator of the Diploma in Writing and Communication and Post Graduate Diploma conducted by the university.

He held the chairman posts of the Sri Lanka Rupavahini Corporation, Independent Television Network (ITN) and Sri Lanka Broadcasting Corporation (SLBC). Ganganath also served as the head of the communications division of the United National Party for a short stunt in 2013. Meanwhile, he served as media advisor to the Prime Minister of Sri Lanka in 1993, 2002 and 2003.

In 2004, he was the chairman of the Board of Directors of the Public Appeals Board, as well as an advisor to the Ministry of Policy Planning and Implementation. He was appointed as the ambassador of Sri Lanka to Japan on 19 September 2015.

As a journalist, his Pani Walalu column was extremely popular with readers. Ganganath authored a book, Adyathana Cinamawe Vishaya Ksheshthraya (The Scope of Modern Cinema).

== Abduction ==
One day in March 2009 at about 7:30 p.m., two people rang the bell of Prof. Ganganath's residence. They requested that he fill out a form as part of a registration program for residents of the area. While Ganganath was filling the form, several more people arrived; one had a pistol and two were armed with T56 rifles. They said that they were from Kahathuduwa police station and needed to search the house. They opened several cupboards and took about 50 CDs. Meanwhile, Ganganath saw a white van parked outside. When he went in the vehicle, the group blindfolded him and tied his hands with a plaster. They took him to a building and asked several political questions. After they took a statement about an opposition leader, they left Ganganath near a paddy field. The Kahathuduwa police station denied any involvement of officers from the police after the incident.

== Honors ==
In 1993, Ganganath was awarded the Mathshumaye Cultural Award by the Tokai University. In 1999, he was conferred with the Hidoyoshi Mimisu Award by the Government of Japan for his outstanding services and contributions to mass media studies.
