= Yugadanavi Power Station =

Power station in Kerawalapitiya, Sri Lanka

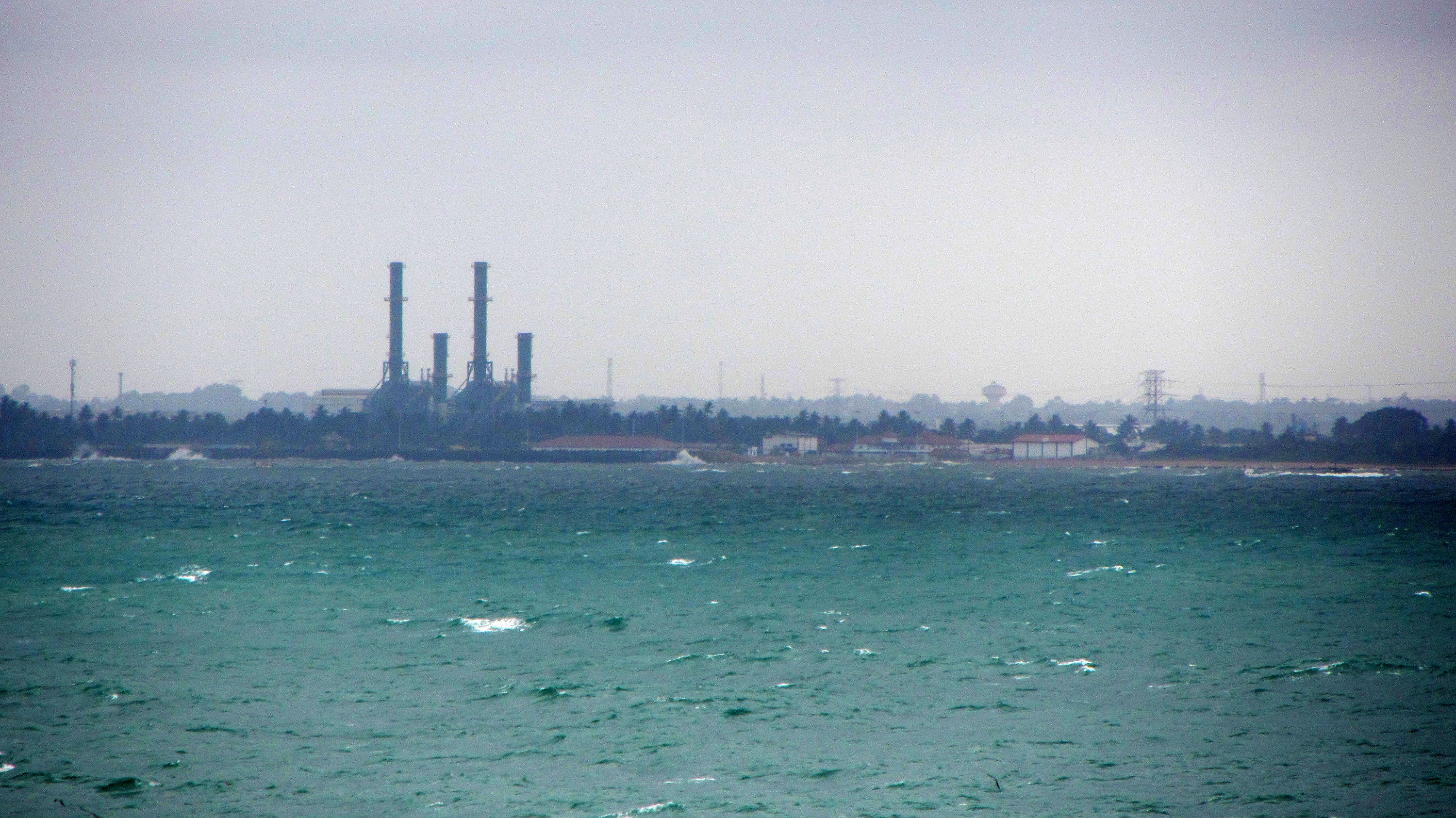
- The power station as seen from the Colombo Harbour, located 8km away.
- Country: Sri Lanka
- Location: Kerawalapitiya
- Coordinates: 7°01′N 79°53′E
- Status: Operational
- Construction began: November 2007
- Commission date: February 2010
- Construction cost: $300 million (2009)
- Owner: LTL Holdings
- Operator: West Coast Power

Thermal power station
- Primary fuel: Fuel oil
- Secondary fuel: Diesel fuel
- Tertiary fuel: Liquefied natural gas
- Turbine technology: Steam turbine
- Combined cycle?: Yes

Power generation
- Units operational: 3 × 100 MW
- Make and model: GE Power 9E.03 (2); Unknown (1)
- Nameplate capacity: 300 MW
- Annual net output: 1,800 GWh (2013)

The Yugadanavi Power Station (also known as Kerawalapitiya Power Station) is a large oil-fired power station in Sri Lanka. The 300 MW power station is located in Kerawalapitiya, in the Western Province of Sri Lanka.

Construction of the power station began in November 2007, and progressed in two phases, with the first 200 MW phase completing in a record 10 months, and the second phase completing later in February 2010. Phase 1 of the power station was ceremonially inaugurated by President Mahinda Rajapakse on 8 December 2008.

The US$300 million power station was supported by a €152 million debt component through HSBC, which was supported by export credit agencies in the United States, Germany, Netherlands, Poland, France, and Austria.

== Specifications ==
Built over a 25 acres (0.10 km^{2}) site, the power station will utilize two 100 MW GE Frame 9E Gas Turbines and one GE steam turbine, and will generate approximately 1,800 GWh annually. The facility uses 25,000 m^{3}/h (880,000 cu ft/h) of seawater for cooling.

== Conversion to LNG ==
On September 21, 2021, U.S. infrastructure firm New Fortress Energy announced they have acquired 40% stake in West Coast Power (Pvt) Ltd the owner of Yugadanavi power station along with the rights to develop a new LNG Terminal off the coast of Colombo that will supply LNG to the power plant. The agreement was approved by the Sri Lankan government allowing New Fortress Energy's investment in West Coast Power Ltd. Trade Unions of the Ceylon Electricity Board (CEB) oppose the agreement and warned the Government of an islandwide power outage after 3 November if it fails to withdraw from the controversial agreement.

== See also ==
- Electricity in Sri Lanka
- List of power stations in Sri Lanka
