= List of schools in Sri Lanka =

As per the 2025 census report by the Education Department of Sri Lanka, there are 10047 Government Schools (396 National Schools and 9651 Provincial Schools), 95 Private Schools, 27 Special Schools and 822 Pirivena (Monastic) Schools. So, this list only includes those with Wikipedia articles.

== Sri Lanka school system ==
Secondary education in Sri Lanka is provided by a diverse selection of educational options:

- National schools, with funding and criteria by the national Ministry of Education
  - 1AB - offers GCE A-levels in all major fields of study
  - 1C - offers all except Sciences GCE A-levels
  - 2 - offers only GCE O-levels
  - 3 - 3(i) offers classes up to 8th grade and 3(ii) offers classes from Grade 1 to 5
- Provincial schools, with funding and criteria by the provincial boards or councils of education
- Private schools, not funded, or only partially funded, by government
- International schools

== Central Province ==
The following is a list of notable schools in Central Province, Sri Lanka.

=== Kandy District ===
In Kandy District, there are 30 Type 1AB schools, 194 Type 1C schools, 216 Type 2 schools and 213 Type 3 schools.

==== National schools ====
- Dharmaraja College, Kandy
- Girls' High School, Kandy
- Kingswood College, Kandy
- Mahamaya Girls' College, Kandy
- Nugawela Central College, Kandy
- Pushpadana Girls' College, Kandy
- St. Sylvester's College, Kandy
- Vidyartha College, Kandy
- Wariyapola Sri Sumangala College, Kandy

==== Provincial schools ====
- Ranabima Royal College, Gannoruwa
- Seethadevi Girls College, Kandy

==== Private schools ====
- Gateway College, Kandy
- Good Shepherd Convent, Kandy
- Hillwood College, Kandy
- Trinity College, Kandy

==== International schools ====
- École internationale Kandy, Kandy

=== Matale District ===
In Matale District, there are 20 Type 1AB schools, 66 Type 1C schools, 101 Type 2 schools and 136 Type 3 schools.

==== National schools ====
- Christ Church College, Matale
- Matale Hindu College, Mandandawela
- St. Thomas' College, Matale
- Vijaya College, Matale
- Weera Keppetipola Central College, Akuramboda
- Zahira College, Matale

=== Nuwara Eliya District ===
In Nuwara Eliya District, there are 35 Type 1AB schools, 89 Type 1C schools, 150 Type 2 schools and 274 Type 3 schools.

- Poramadulla Central College, Rikillagaskada
- Sri Sumangala National College, Nildandahinna
- St. Xavier's College, Nuwara Eliya

== Eastern Province ==
The following is a list of notable schools in Eastern Province, Sri Lanka.

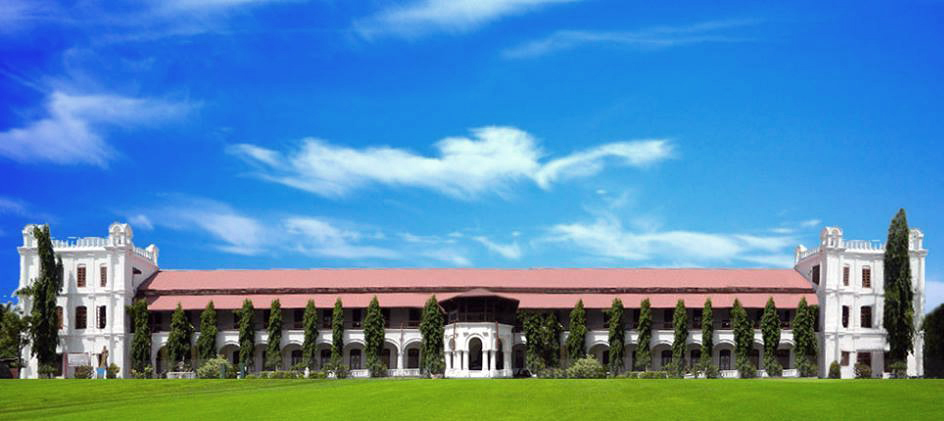
St. Michael's College National School

=== Ampara District ===
==== National schools ====
- Akkaraipattu Muslim Central College, Akkaraipattu
- Carmel Fatima College, Kalmunai
- Thambiluvil Central College, Thambiluvil
- Sri Ramakrishna College, Akkaraipattu

==== Provincial schools ====
- Shams Central College, Maruthamunai
- Vipulananda Central College, Karaitivu

=== Batticaloa District ===
==== National schools ====
- Kattankudy Central College, Kattankudy
- St. Cecilia's Girls' College, Batticaloa
- St. Michael's College National School, Batticaloa
- Valaichchenai Hindu College, Batticaloa
- Vincent Girls' High School, Batticaloa

==== Provincial schools ====
- Batticaloa Hindu College, Batticaloa
- Chenkalady Central College, Chenkalady
- Mahajana College, Batticaloa
- Methodist Central College, Batticaloa

=== Trincomalee District ===
==== National schools ====
- R. K. M. Sri Koneswara Hindu College, Trincomalee
- Sri Shanmuga Hindu Ladies College, Trincomalee
- St. Joseph's College, Trincomalee
- St. Mary's College, Trincomalee

==== Provincial schools ====
- Methodist Girls' College, Trincomalee
- Orr's Hill Vivekananda College, Trincomalee

== Northern Province ==
The following is a list of notable schools in Northern Province, Sri Lanka.

=== National schools ===
- Chavakachcheri Hindu College, Chavakachcheri
- Jaffna Central College, Jaffna
- Jaffna Hindu College, Jaffna
- Sithivinayagar Hindu College, Mannar
- St. Xavier's Boys' College, Mannar
- St. Xavier's Girls' College, Mannar
- Vaddukoddai Hindu College, Vaddukoddai
- Vavuniya Muslim Maha Vidyalayam, Vavuniya
- Vavuniya Tamil Madhya Maha Vidyalayam, Vavuniya
- Vembadi Girls’ High School, Jaffna

=== Private schools ===
- Chundikuli Girls' College, Jaffna
- Jaffna College, Vaddukoddai
- St. John's College, Jaffna
- St. Patrick's College, Gurunagar
- Uduvil Girls' College, Uduvil

=== Provincial schools ===
- Achchuveli Central College, Achchuveli
- Attiar Hindu College, Neervely
- Chemmalai Maha Vidyalayam, Alampil
- Hartley College, Point Pedro
- Holy Family Convent, Jaffna
- Jaffna Hindu Ladies' College, Jaffna
- Jaffna Hindu Primary School, Jaffna
- Kilinochchi Central College, Kilinochchi
- Kilinochchi Hindu College, Kilinochchi
- Kilinochchi Maha Vidyalayam, Kilinochchi
- Kokuvil Hindu College, Kokkuvil
- Kumulamunai Maha Vidhyalayam, Kumulamunai
- Mahajana College, Tellippalai
- Mallavi Central College, Mallavi
- Manipay Hindu College, Manipay
- Manipay Ladies' College, Manipay
- Meesalai Veerasingam Maha Vidyalayam, Meesalai
- Methodist Girls' High School, Point Pedro
- Mullaitivu Maha Vidyalayam, Mullaitivu
- Nelliady Madhya Maha Vidyalayam, Nelliady
- Omanthai Central College, Omanthai
- Osmania College, Jaffna
- Puthukkudiyiruppu Central College, Puthukkudiyiruppu
- Ramanathan College, Chunnakam
- Ramanathapuram West Government Tamil Mixed School, Vaddakkachchi
- Saivapragasa Ladies' College, Vavuniya
- Sandilipay Hindu College, Sandilipay
- Sithivinayagar Vidyalayam, Point Pedro
- Udupiddy American Mission College, Udupiddy
- Udupiddy Girls' College, Udupiddy
- Union College, Telippalai
- Urumpirai Saiva Tamil Vidyalayam, Urumpirai
- Vadamarachchi Hindu Girls' College, Point Pedro
- Vaddakkachchi Maha Vidyalayam, Vaddakkachchi
- Vaitheeswara Vidyalayam, Jaffna
- Varany Maha Vidyalayam, Varany
- Velanai Central College, Velanai
- Velautham Maha Vidyalayam, Point Pedro
- Victoria College, Chulipuram
- Vidyananda College, Mulliyawalai
- Vigneswara College, Karaveddy
- Vipulanantha College, Vavuniya
- Visuvamadu Maha Vidyalayam, Visuvamadu
- Yarlton College, Karainagar

== North Central Province ==
The following is a list of notable schools in North Central Province, Sri Lanka.

=== Anuradhapura District ===
In Anuradhapura District, there are 36 Type 1AB schools, 103 Type 1C schools, 162 Type 2 schools and 261 Type 3 schools.

- Anuradhapura Central College, Anuradhapura
- St. Joseph's College, Anuradhapura

=== Polonnaruwa District ===
In Polonnaruwa District, there are 25 Type 1AB schools, 35 Type 1C schools, 57 Type 2 schools and 138 Type 3 schools.

- Royal Central College, Polonnaruwa

== North Western Province ==
The following is a list of notable schools in North Western Province, Sri Lanka.

=== Kurunegala District ===
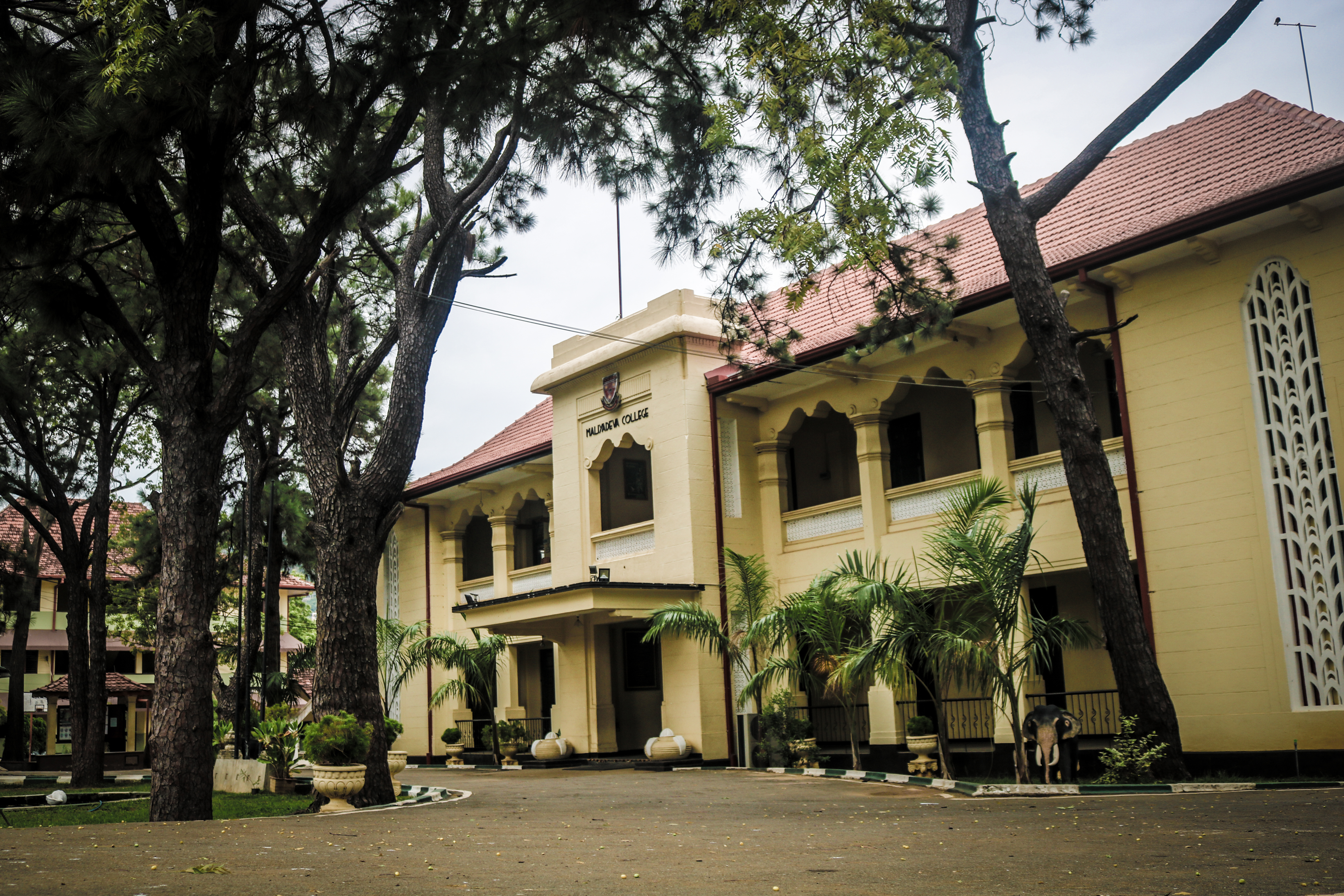
Maliyadeva College, Kurunegala

In Kurunegala District, there are 77 Type 1AB schools, 181 Type 1C schools, 268 Type 2 schools and 347 Type 3 schools.

==== National schools ====
- Kekunagolla National School, Narammala
- Kuliyapitiya Central College, Kuliyapitiya
- Maliyadeva College, Kurunegala
- Maliyadeva Girls' College, Kurunegala
- St. Anne's College, Kurunegala
- Vijayaba National College, Maho

==== Provincial schools ====
- Holy Family Convent, Kurunegala
- Maliyadeva Adarsha Maha Vidyalaya, Kurunegala
- Pannawa Muslim Central College, Pannawa
- Royal College Wayamba, Kurunegala
- Sir John Kothalawala College, Kurunegala

=== Puttalam District ===
In Puttalam District, there are 35 Type 1AB schools, 81 Type 1C schools, 148 Type 2 schools and 109 Type 3 schools.

==== National schools ====
- Joseph Vaz College, Wennappuwa

==== Provincial schools ====
- Holy Family Girls School, Wennappuwa
- Puttalam Hindu Central College, Puttalam
- St. Xavier's College, Marawila

== Sabaragamuwa Province ==
The following is a list of notable schools in Sabaragamuwa Province, Sri Lanka.

=== Kegalle District ===
In Kegalle District, there are 48 Type 1AB schools, 93 Type 1C schools, 185 Type 2 schools and 203 Type 3 schools.

==== National schools ====
- Kegalu Vidyalaya, Kegalle
- Kegalu Balika Vidyalaya, Kegalle
- Pinnawala Central College, Pinnawala
- St. Mary's College, Kegalle

=== Ratnapura District ===
In Ratnapura district, there are 55 1AB schools, 90 1C schools, 250 Type 2 schools and 206 Type 3 schools.

==== National schools ====
- Ferguson High School, Ratnapura
- Kalawana Central College, Kalawana
- St. Aloysius College, Ratnapura
- Sivali Central College, Hidellana

==== Provincial schools ====
- Embilipitiya Maha Vidyalaya, Embilipitiya
- St. Agnes Balika Maha Vidyalaya, Balangoda
- St. Luke's College, Ratnapura
- Sri Shariputhra Maha Vidyalaya, Imbulpe

== Southern Province ==
The following is a list of notable schools in Southern Province, Sri Lanka.

=== Galle District ===
In Galle district, there are 81 1AB schools, 161 1C schools, 97 Type 2 schools and 92 Type 3 schools.

==== National schools ====
- All Saints College, Galle Fort
- Ananda Central College, Elpitiya
- Devapathiraja College, Rathgama
- Dharmasoka College, Ambalangoda
- Karandeniya Central College, Karandeniya
- Kularathna Maha Vidyalaya, Ambalangoda
- Nagoda Royal National College, Nagoda
- Richmond College, Galle
- Rippon Girls' College, Galle
- Sacred Heart Convent, Galle
- Sanghamitta Girls College, Galle
- Siridhamma College, Labuduwa
- Sri Devananda College, Ambalangoda
- Upananda College, Walahanduwa
- Vidyaloka College, Galle

==== Provincial schools ====
- Rajapaksha College, Ahungalla

=== Matara District ===
In Matara district, there are 45 1AB schools, 72 1C schools, 127 Type 2 schools and 119 Type 3 schools.

==== National schools ====
- Matara Central College, Matara
- St. Servatius' College, Matara
- St. Thomas' College, Matara
- St. Thomas' Girls' High School, Matara
- Sujatha Vidyalaya, Matara
- Telijjawila Central College, Telijjawila

==== Provincial schools ====
- Matara Janadhipathi Vidyalaya, Matara
- Rajakeeya Maha Vidyalaya, Telijjawila
- Sri Sumedha Maha Vidyalaya, Malimbada

=== Hambantota District ===
==== National schools ====
- Rajapaksha Central College, Weeraketiya
- St. Mary's College, Hambantota
- Tangalle Boys' School, Tangalle
- Zahira College, Hambantota

== Uva Province ==
The following is a list of notable schools in Uva Province, Sri Lanka.

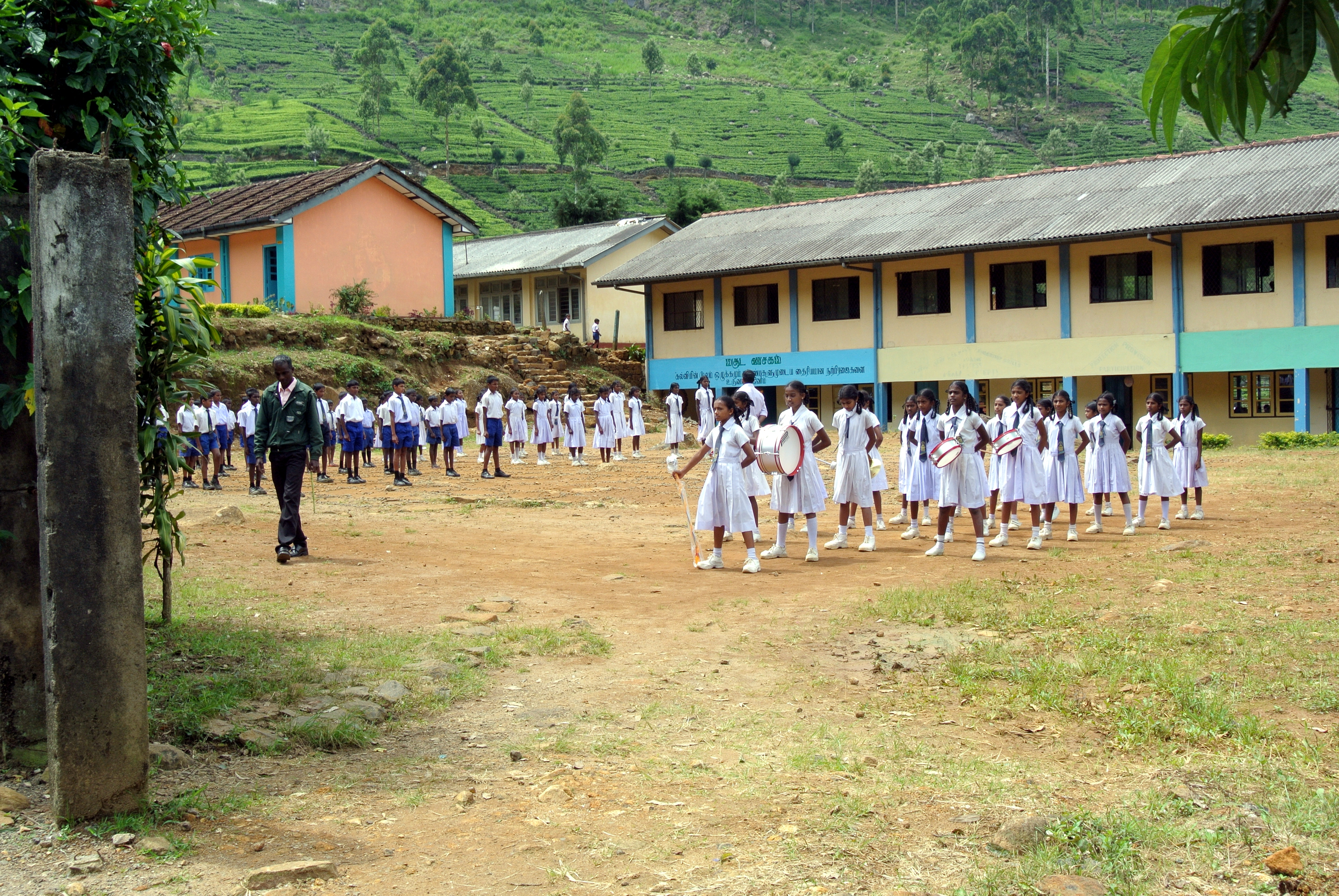
A school in the district of Badulla

=== Badulla District ===
In Badulla District, there are 48 Type 1AB schools, 101 Type 1C schools, 112 Type 2 schools and 130 Type 3 schools.

==== National schools ====
- Bandarawela Central College, Bandarawela
- Dharmadutha College, Badulla
- St. Joseph's College, Bandarawela
- Uva College, Badulla
- Vishaka Girls High School, Badulla

==== Private schools ====
- S. Thomas' College, Bandarawela
- S. Thomas' College, Gurutalawa

=== Moneragala District ===
In Monaragala district, there are 35 1AB schools, 46 1C schools, 119 Type 2 schools and 94 Type 3 schools.

- Uva Royal College, Monaragala

== Western Province ==
The following is a list of notable schools in Western Province, Sri Lanka.

=== Colombo District ===
In Colombo District, there are 39 Type 1AB schools, 81 Type 1C schools, 149 Type 2 schools and 100 Type 3 schools.

==== National schools ====
- Ananda College, Colombo
- Ananda Sastralaya, Kotte
- Anula Vidyalaya, Nugegoda
- Defence Services School, Colombo
- Devi Balika Vidyalaya, Borella
- Dharmapala Vidyalaya, Pannipitiya
- D. S. Senanayake College, Cinnamon Gardens
- Hameed Al Husseinie College, Colombo
- Hindu College, Bambalapitiya
- Isipathana College, Havelock Town
- Lumbini College, Colombo
- Mahanama College, Kollupitiya Colombo 03
- Nalanda College, Colombo
- Piliyandala Central College, Piliyandala
- President's College, Kotte
- Prince of Wales' College, Moratuwa
- Princess of Wales' College, Moratuwa
- Royal College, Cinnamon Gardens
- Science College, Mount Lavinia
- Sirimavo Bandaranaike Vidyalaya, Colombo
- Thurstan College, Cinnamon Gardens
- Visakha Vidyalaya, Colombo

==== Provincial schools ====
- Dudley Senanayake Maha Vidyalaya, Colombo
- St. John's College, Dematagoda
- St. Lucia's College, Kotahena
- St. Thomas' College, Kotte

==== Private schools ====
- Bishop's College, Colombo
- Buddhist Ladies' College, Colombo
- Carey College, Borella
- C.M.S. Ladies' College, Colombo
- Elizabeth Moir School, Colombo
- Good Shepherd Convent, Kotahena
- Gateway College, Dehiwala
- Holy Family Convent, Bambalapitiya, Colombo
- Methodist College, Colombo
- Musaeus College, Colombo
- Overseas School of Colombo, Pelawatte
- St. Benedict's College, Kotahena
- St. Bridget's Convent, Colombo
- St. Joseph's College, Maradana
- St. Joseph's Boys' College, Nugegoda
- St. Peter's College, Bambalapitiya
- St. Sebastian's College, Moratuwa
- St. Thomas' College, Mount Lavinia
- St. Thomas' Preparatory School, Kollupitiya
- Wesley College, Borella
- Zahira College, Maradana

==== International schools ====
- Amal International School, Wellawatte
- British School in Colombo, Borella
- Colombo International School, Colombo
- Crescent Schools International
- École Française Internationale de Colombo, Colombo
- Learnium International School, Rajagiriya
- Lyceum International School

=== Gampaha District ===
In Gampaha District, there are 68 Type 1AB schools, 107 Type 1C schools, 187 Type 2 schools and 177 Type 3 schools.

==== National schools ====
- Bandaranayake Central College, Veyangoda
- Bandaranayake College, Gampaha
- D. S. Senanayake Central College, Mirigama
- Nalanda (Boys') Central College, Minuwangoda
- Newstead Girls College, Negombo
- Rathnavali Balika Vidyalaya, Gampaha
- St. Anthony's College, Wattala
- Sri Dharmaloka College, Kelaniya

==== Provincial schools ====
- Bandarawatta Parakrama Maha Vidyalaya, Bandarawatta
- Basilica College, Ragama
- Nalanda (Girls') Central College, Minuwangoda
- St. Mary's College, Negombo
- St. Peter's College, Negombo
- St. Sebastian's College, Kandana
- Wijayaratnam Hindu Central College, Negombo
- Yasodara Devi Balika Maha Vidyalaya, Gampaha

==== Private schools ====
- Ave Maria Convent Branch School, Negombo
- De Mazenod College, Kandana
- Gateway College, Negombo
- Maris Stella College, Negombo
- St. Joseph's College, Wattala
- St. Peter's College, Udugampola

==== International schools ====
- Royal Institute International School, Gampaha

=== Kalutara District ===
In Kalutara District, there are 53 Type 1AB schools, 86 Type 1C schools, 145 Type 2 schools and 152 Type 3 schools.

==== National schools ====
- Horana Royal College, Horana
- Kalutara Vidyalaya, Kalutara
- Panadura Royal College, Panadura
- St. John's College, Panadura
- Sri Palee College, Horana
- Sri Sumangala College, Panadura
- Taxila Central College, Horana
- Tissa Central College, Kalutara
- Zahira College, Dharga Town

==== Provincial schools ====
- Al Hambra Maha Vidyalaya, Dharga Town
- Jeelan Central College, Panadura
- Muslim Central College, Kalutara

== See also ==
- List of the oldest schools in Sri Lanka
- List of international schools in Sri Lanka

== Bibliography ==
- Schools Basic Data as at 01.10.2010. Northern Provincial Council. 2010. Archived from the original on 3 December 2013.
- "School Directory". SchoolNET. Archived from the original on 24 December 2010.
