= Hindu College =

Hindu College may refers to several colleges around the world, including:

== India ==
- Gobardanga Hindu College, West Bengal
- Hindu College, Delhi, founded in 1899
- Hindu College, Guntur, Andhra Pradesh
- Hindu Degree College, Moradabad, Uttar Pradesh
- Presidency University, Kolkata and Hindu School, Kolkata, West Bengal, which was called Hindu College until 1855.

== Sri Lanka ==
- Attiar Hindu College
- Batticaloa Hindu College
- Chavakachcheri Hindu College
- Colombo Hindu College
- Jaffna Hindu College
- Jaffna Hindu Ladies' College
- Kilinochchi Hindu College
- Kokuvil Hindu College
- Manipay Hindu College
- Manipay Ladies' Hindu College
- Puttalam Hindu Central College
- Sandilipay Hindu College
- Sithivinayagar Hindu College
- Sri Shanmuga Hindu Ladies College
- Trincomalee Hindu College
- Vadamarachchi Hindu Girls' College
- Vaddukoddai Hindu College
- Valaichchenai Hindu College
- Wijayaratnam Hindu Central College

== Guyana ==
- Hindu College, Cove and John
