= Royal Central =

Royal Central may refer to:

- Royal Central School in London
- Royal Central College, Polonnaruwa in Sri Lanka
- Royal Central College, Telijjawila in Sri Lanka
- Royal Central Asian Society
  - Journal of the Royal Central Asian Society
