= Shams Central College, Maruthamunai =

Shams Central College Maruthamunai

Location
- Nooraniya Road, Maruthamunai; Ampara, Eastern Province; Sri Lanka
- 7°25′56″N 81°48′41″E

Information
- School type: Government School
- Authority: Ministry of Education, Eastern Province
- Category: Government School
- Grades: 6 - A/L
- Age: 11 to 19
- Education system: National Secondary Education Curriculum of Ministry of Education (Sri Lanka)
- Language: Tamil
- Sports: Cricket^{2}, football^{2}
- School fees: Free education
- Website: http://www.shams.sch.lk

Shams Central College is a public school located in Maruthamunai, Eastern Province, Sri Lanka. The school provides both primary and secondary education from Grade 6 to Advanced Level.

== History ==
The school started in 1959 as Karavahu East Government Muslim Mixed School with a Coconut Leafy cadjan hut classrooms with 114 students (Girls:49 and Boys 65) and 7 teachers.

== Former headteachers ==
The first principal of the school was Marhoom Al Haj IMA. Kuthoos.

== See also ==
- Education in Sri Lanka
- List of schools in Sri Lanka
- List of schools in Eastern Province, Sri Lanka
