= Piliyandala Central College =

National school in Piliyandala, Sri Lanka

Central College Piliyandala පිලියන්දල මධ්‍ය මහා විද්‍යාලය பிலியன்தல மத்திய வித்தியாலயம்

Location
- Piliyandala; Sri Lanka; 6°47′59″N 79°55′15″E

Information
- Other names: PCC
- Type: National
- Motto: Bodetha pabodetha dametha "බොධෙථ පබොධෙථ දමෙථ " Awareness Enlightenment Discipline
- Established: 1887 (135 years ago)
- Founder: Mampe Saranapala Thero
- Principal: R.A.R.M. Rathnayake
- Staff: 200+
- Grades: Class 6 - 13
- Gender: Mix
- Age: 11 to 19
- Enrollment: 4000
- Language: Sinhala, English
- Colours: Dark blue, gold and maroon
- Song: සිරිබර මැදි විදුහල් මාතා ("Beautiful Mother Central College") Anthem Of Piliyandala Central College
- Affiliation: Buddhism
- Former pupils: Old Centralions
- Website: www.piliyandalacentral.edu.lk

Piliyandala Central College (Sinhala: පිලියන්දල මධ්‍ය මහා විද්‍යාලය; Tamil: பிலியன்தல மத்திய வித்தியாலயம்) is a selective entry mixed-gender school located in Piliyandala, Sri Lanka. It is the first government-run mixed-gender secondary school in the country.

College students are known as Centralions and past pupils are known as Old Centralions.

== History ==
The school was first established in 1887 by Mampe Saranapala Thero as the Mampe Piyarathanasara Buddhist Mix School, one of the first Buddhist schools in Sri Lanka. As the school grew, Thero handed the school over to the Buddhist Theosophical Society for better administration. The Buddhist Theosophical Society was unable to maintain the school due to an excessive number of students; consequently, they transferred the school's care to the government.

In 1920, as a part of a government program created by a British agent of Piliyandala, a Public English Medium Mix School opened adjacently to the Sinhalese Medium Mix School (formerly known as the Mampe Piyarathanasara Buddhist Mix School). The headmaster for the new school was S.W. Sahabandu.

C. W. W. Kannangara combined the schools forming Piliyandala Central College on the 4th of January 1944. Later that year, on March 4th, the school was converted into Madhya Vidyalaya Central College.

== Administration ==
The Ministry of Education funds the college and appoints its principals. The principal is the head of the college administration and is assisted by a deputy principal. The college is divided into two portions of students, the middle and high schools, each coming under the supervision of an assistant principal. The college educates around 3,700 students.

Since its establishment, the main language of education has been Sinhalese. In 2009, English was introduced as an optional language of education for the main subjects at the college. Students may select one of the two languages to conduct their studies in.

== Admission ==
Admission to the college is among the most competitive outside the Colombo city metro area. It receives its highest number of applications for admission to grade 6 via the grade 5 scholarship examination. A number of students from all over the area also enter grade 12 via the G.C.E. Ordinary Level examination.

== Campus ==
The school is mostly located in Piliyandala but also spreads towards Suwariyapola, occupying a total land area of about 48,000 m^{2} (520,000 sq ft). The facilities include lecture halls, science and ICT laboratories, an auditorium, a swimming pool complex and a cricket ground.

== Sports ==
An annual cricket match between Central College Piliyandala and its rival, the Taxila Central College in Horana, known as the Battle of the Salpiti-Raigam, has been held since 2001.

== Houses ==
Each student is assigned to one of four houses named after ancient Sinhala kings of Sri Lanka: Gemunu, Wijaya, Parakrama and Thissa.

== Clubs ==
Prefect Club

Members of the Perfect Club build on their teamwork and communication skills while working with different age groups, taking the initiative to propose new ideas to help to improve the school.

Aesthetic Club

The Aesthetic Club pertains to the study of the mind and perceived beauty, literature, and other art forms. It presents programs of a literary, artistic, musical, and timely trend to assist in educational uplift, and to bring its members together for social enjoyment.

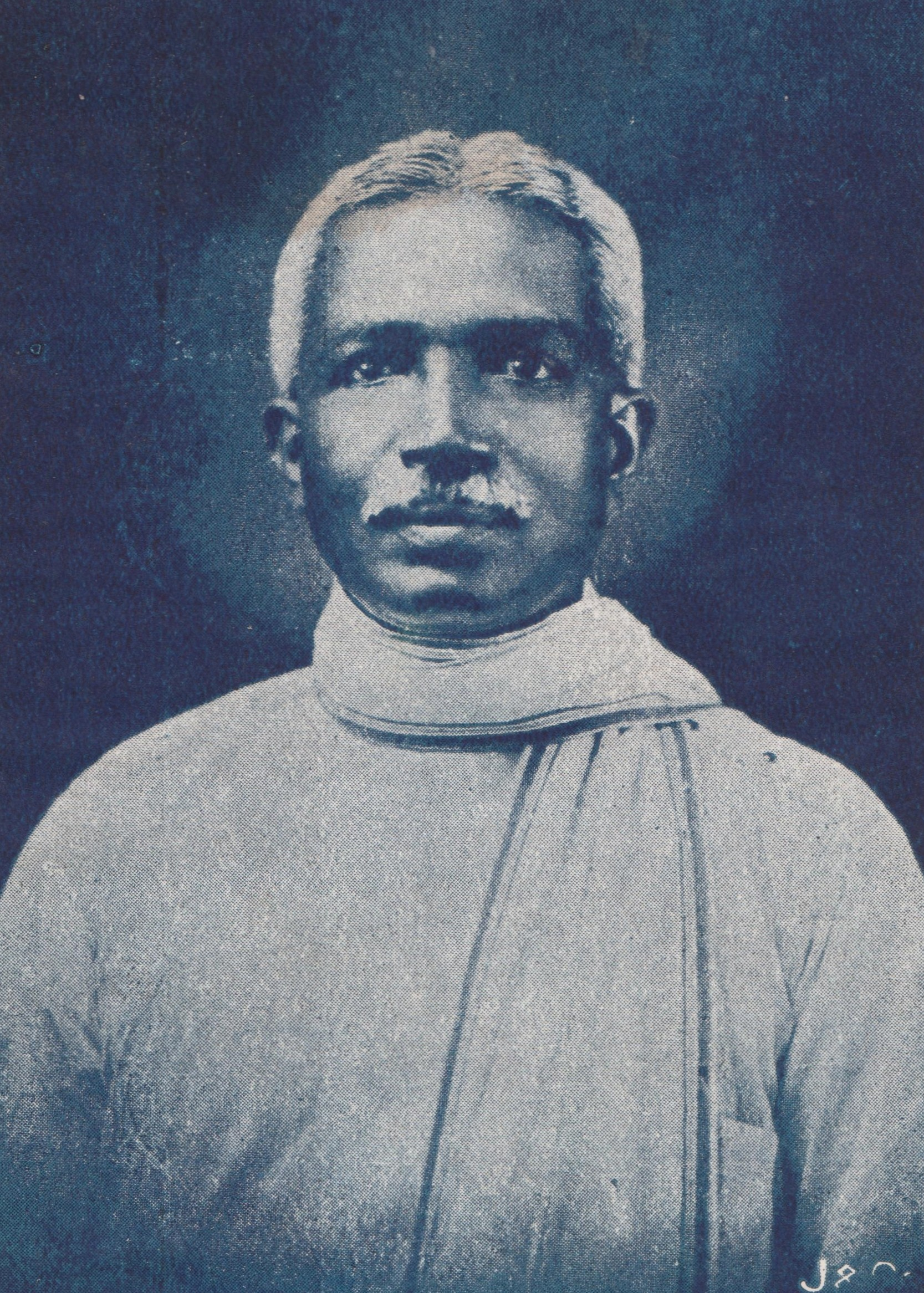
Hon. Mr. C.W.W. Kannangara

== See also ==
- Education in Sri Lanka
- Madhya Maha Vidyalaya
- List of schools in Sri Lanka
