= Vavuniya Tamil Madhya Maha Vidyalayam =

Public school in Sri Lanka

- வவுனியா தமிழ் மத்திய மகா வித்தியாலயம்
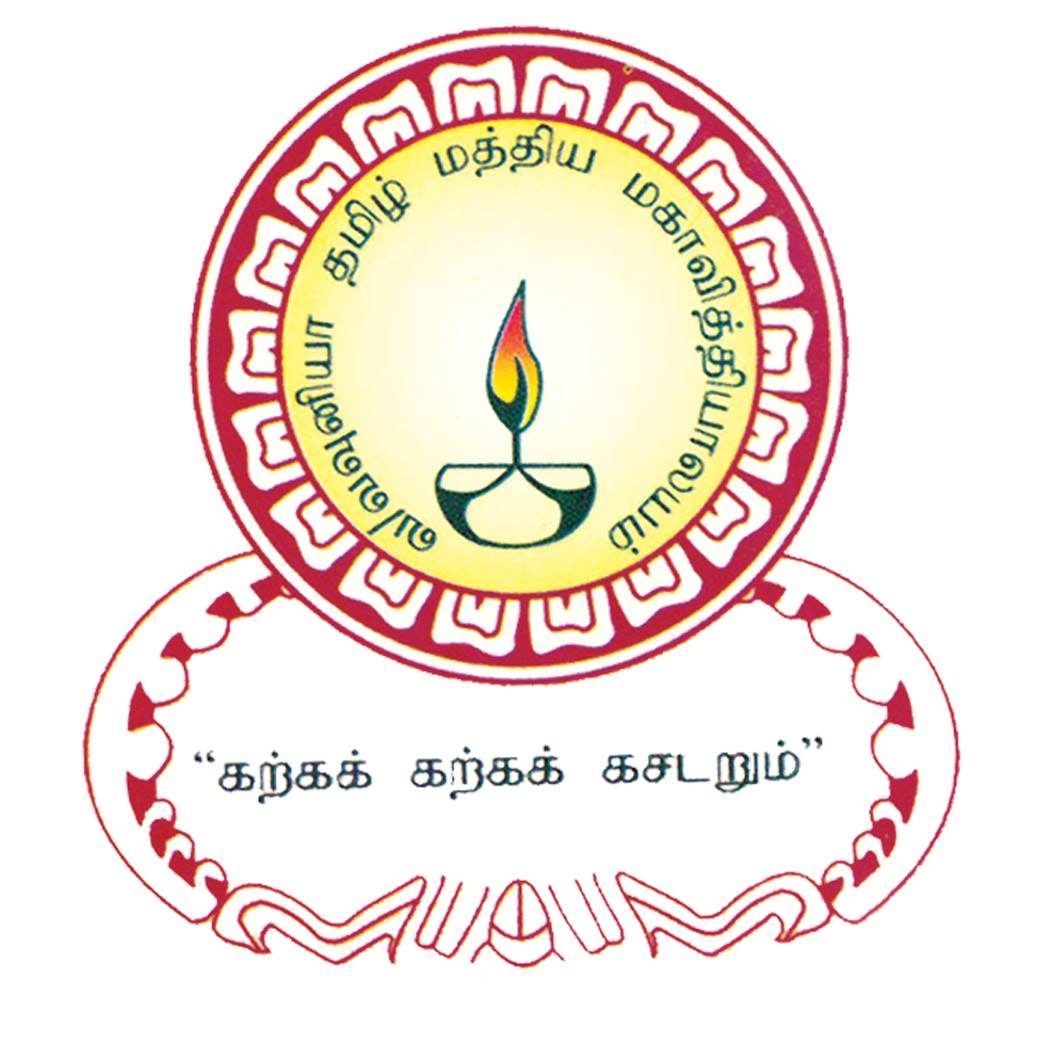

Location
- Vavuniya Town; Sri Lanka
- Coordinates: 8.750379°N 80.497010°E

Information
- School type: Public 1AB
- Motto: கற்க கசடறும் Knowledge Purifies
- Established: July 1929; 96 years ago
- Founder: Mr.C.Mutthaiah
- Dean: Mr.Nine ombathu 9
- Principal: A.Logeswaran
- Head of school: Ombathu.deci
- Staff: 468
- Grades: 1-13
- Gender: Mixed
- Age: 6 to 19
- Enrollment: 8956
- Colors: Copper Red and Yellow
- Song: வாழிய தமிழ் மத்திய மகாவித்தியாலயம் வாழிய வாழியவே! Long Live Tamil Madya Mahavidiyalayam!
- Publication: Katirāḷi(The Pupil)
- Affiliation: Ministry of Education
- Alumni: Mahavidyans
- Website: VTMMV

Vavuniya Tamil Madhya Maha Vidyalayam, also known as VTMMV (Tamil: வவுனியா தமிழ் மத்திய மகா வித்தியாலயம் Vavuṉiyā Tamiḻ Mattiya Maha Vidhyālayam); (Sinhala: වවුනියාව දෙමළ මධ්‍ය මහා විද්‍යාලයVavuniyāva Demaḷa Madhya Mahā Vidyālaya), is a national school located in Vavuniya, Sri Lanka.

== History ==
Vavuniya Tamil Madhya Maha Vidyalayam was initially established in 1929 during the British colonial period. However, its official commencement occurred in 1931 with 25 students and two teachers, under the leadership of Mr. C. Muthiah as the principal. The school was first located on Mannar Road. During the Second World War, when the school premises were requisitioned for medical purposes to treat wounded soldiers, classes temporarily shifted to part of Mr. K.D. Gunarathanam's house in Vairavarpuliyankulam.

In 1948, following the country's independence and the departure of military personnel, the school returned to its original building on Mannar Road. At that time, primary school students from surrounding rural villages began enrolling for secondary education, leading to an increase in student numbers to 160. Consequently, the school was upgraded to a secondary school with Mr. N. Nadarasa as the principal, supported by nine dedicated teachers. This period saw notable contributions from educators such as Mr. E.S. Navaratnam, Mr. S. Padmanathan, Mr. Kandasamipillai, Mr. S. Arunachalam, Mrs. N. Milvaganam, Mrs. S. Thangarasu, and Mrs. C. Gunarathanam.

Mr. S.J. Soundaranayagam took charge of the sports department, significantly advancing the school’s achievements not only in sports but also in music and dance. Students participated in competitions at school, district, and provincial levels. Three student houses—Bharathi, Ilango, and Pugazhendhi—were established to facilitate sports competitions. Due to limited space, these events were held at the Vavuniya Municipal Council ground.

In 1952, the Scouts Movement was introduced under the guidance of Mr. V. Emanuel. In 1955, Mr. Ganesan became the principal and worked closely with the Parents and Teachers Association to address the school’s resource constraints. With the support of Member of Parliament Hon. C. Sundharalingam, 40 acres of land on Kandy Road were allocated to the school. In 1958, the school was relocated to this new site. The former premises on Mannar Road continued as a Sinhala-medium school named Gamini Vidyalayam.

Mr. J.G. Samuel served as the principal in 1958, supported by 15 teachers. Subsequent principals included Mr. S. Irasanayakam (1962–1967) and Mr. S. Ariyaratnam (1967–1971). The school anthem was composed by poet Mr. S. Chinnathambi, with music by Pon Nadarasa.

In 1962, the school introduced the GCE A/L Arts stream, and its first university entrant from the arts stream was Apputhurai Jayaseeli. During Mr. P. Sivagurunathan’s tenure as principal (1972–1976), commerce and science streams were added to the A/L curriculum. Muthulingam Arulranchitham became the first science stream student to gain university admission.

From 1976 to 1993, the school saw steady growth under principals Mr. M. Lokasingham, Mr. P. Sivagnanam, Mr. S. Kandiah, and Mr. Su. Sivapalan. Under Mr. S. Sivakumaran (1993–1998), the school was elevated to national status. In 1996, due to the displacement of people from Jaffna, the school operated in two shifts—morning and evening—to accommodate the influx of students.

Later principals, including Mrs. Chidambaranathan (1998–2000), Mr. I. Irasarathanam (2000–2004), and Mr. C. Ulaganathan (2004–2010), oversaw further advancements despite challenges, such as hosting displaced persons in school buildings. During Mr. M.S. Padmanathan’s tenure (2011–2016), the school expanded to over 3,000 students and 160 teachers, with five houses—Bharathi, Ilango, Valluvar, Pugazhendhi, and Kambar. In 2012, a technological stream was introduced for GCE A/L, making the school one of the most comprehensive in the Northern Province.

Following Mr. Padmanathan’s retirement, Mr. C. Marianayagam focused on improving physical resources. In 2016, Mr. Tha. Amirthalingam became principal, leading the school to national recognition in co-curricular activities.

== Administration ==
The school is funded by the Ministry of Education, which appoints its principal. The principal serves as the head of the school administration and is supported by deputy principals and vice principals. The school is divided into two sections: the Primary School and the Secondary School. Each section is managed by its own principal, with the principal of the Secondary School also serving as the Head Principal overseeing both sections. The school educates approximately 3,500 students across primary and secondary levels.

The prefects play a significant role in maintaining discipline within the school. As senior students preparing for their Advanced Level (A/L) examinations, they hold authority over other students of Vavuniya Tamil Madya Maha Vidyalayam, reinforcing discipline across all grades.

Since its establishment, Tamil has been the primary medium of instruction. However, in 2003, English was introduced as an additional medium of education. Students can now choose between Tamil and English for their studies.

== School Anthem ==
Tamil	Transliteration	English
வாழிய தமிழ் மத்திய மகா வித்தியாலயம் வாழிய வாழியவே! வையகம் உள்ளவரைக்கும் நீ வாழிய வாழிய வாழியவே! வண்டல் வளத்தால் வயல்கள் செழித்திடும் வன்னி நகருறை நின் கொண்டல் நிகர் கல்வி குறையா தளித்திடும் வாழிய வாழியவே! செந்தமிழ், ஆங்கிலம், தீஞ்சுவை இன்னிசை, சிறப்புறு விஞ்ஞானம், அந்தமில், கைத்தொழில், கமத்தொழில், உடற்கலை, எண்கலை, நுண்கலையும் நேர்மையொடு ஒழுக்கமும் நிறைவுற அளித்திடும் செம்பொன் னிறமடை நின் சீர்பெறு லட்சியம் சிறந்து விளங்கிடச் சேர்ந்து உழைத்திடு வோம் வாழிய தமிழ் மத்திய மகா வித்தியாலயம் வாழிய வாழியவே!	Vāḻiya tamiḻ mattiya makā vittiyālayam vāḻiya vāḻiyavē! Vaiyakam uḷḷavaraikkum nī vāḻiya vāḻiya vāḻiyavē! Vaṇṭal vaḷattāl vayalkaḷ ceḻittiṭum vaṉṉi nakaruṟai niṉ Koṇṭal nikar kalvi kuṟaiyā taḷittiṭum vāḻiya vāḻiyavē! Centamiḻ, āṅkilam, tīñcuvai iṉṉicai, ciṟappuṟu viññāṉam, Antamil, kaittoḻil, kamattoḻil, uṭaṟkalai, eṇkalai, nuṇkalaiyum Nērmaiyoṭu oḻukkamum niṟaivuṟa aḷittiṭum cempoṉ ṉiṟamaṭai niṉ Cīrpeṟu laṭciyam ciṟantu viḷaṅkiṭac cērntu uḻaittiṭu vōm Vāḻiya tamiḻ mattiya makā vittiyālayam vāḻiya vāḻiyavē!	Long Live Tamil Madhya Maha Vidyalayam Long live, long live! Live as long as the world endures Long live, long live! In the fertile lands where fields thrive, Nestled in the city of Vavuniya, A school that imparts knowledge with care, Long live, long live! Tamil, English, Music, Science, Crafts, Agriculture, Physical Education, Arithmetic, Fine Arts, A temple that teaches virtues, ethics, and morals. With righteousness and wisdom, Let us unite to achieve our shared goal, Long live Tamil Madhya Maha Vidyalayam, Long live, long live!

== Sports ==
This school is regarded as the largest in Vavuniya and the Northern Region. It has won numerous medals in provincial and national competitions, thanks to its large student body. The school’s sports competition is held every year in either January or February. There are five houses in the school, each assigned based on the final digit of the student's admission number.

House Name	Color	Digit
Bharathi	Blue	4,5
Ilango	Red	2,7
Kambar	Purple	1,8
Pugazhenthi	Yellow	3,6
Valluavar	Green	0,9

- List of schools in Northern Province, Sri Lanka
