= Vaddakkachchi Maha Vidyalayam =

Provincial school in Vaddakkachchi, Sri Lanka

Vaddakkachchi M.V.
- வட்டக்கச்சி ம.வி.

Location
- Kadson Road; Vaddakkachchi, Kilinochchi District, Northern Province; Sri Lanka
- Coordinates: 9°22′26″N 80°27′22″E

Information
- School type: Public provincial 1AB
- School district: Kilinochchi Education Zone
- Authority: Northern Provincial Council
- School number: 1101004
- Principal: M. C. L. Manuel
- Teaching staff: 32
- Grades: 1-13
- Gender: Mixed
- Age range: 5-18

Vaddakkachchi Maha Vidyalayam (Tamil: வட்டக்கச்சி மகா வித்தியாலயம் Vaṭṭakkacci Makā Vittiyālayam) is a provincial school in Vaddakkachchi, Sri Lanka.

== See also ==
- List of schools in Northern Province, Sri Lanka
