= Velanai Central College =

- வேலணை மத்திய கல்லூரி

Location
- Velanai West; Jaffna; Sri Lanka; 9°38′45.60″N 79°53′36.30″E

Information
- School type: Public provincial 1AB
- Founded: 1945
- Founder: Sir Waithilingam Duraiswamy
- School district: Islands Education Zone
- Authority: Northern Provincial Council
- School number: 1014019
- Principal: VE. Gaston Roy
- Teaching staff: 30
- Grades: 1-13
- Gender: Co-educational
- Age range: 5-18

Velanai Central College (Tamil: வேலணை மத்திய கல்லூரி Vēlaṇai Mattiya Kallūri) is a provincial school in Velanai, Sri Lanka.

== See also ==
- List of schools in Northern Province, Sri Lanka
