= Visuvamadu Maha Vidyalayam =

School in Northern Province, Sri Lanka

Visuvamadu M.V.

Location
- Visuvamadu, Mullaitivu District, Northern Province; Sri Lanka
- Coordinates: 9°22′34.20″N 80°33′00.60″E

Information
- School type: Public provincial 1AB
- School district: Mullaitivu Education Zone
- Authority: Northern Provincial Council
- School number: 1404010
- Teaching staff: 17
- Grades: 1-13
- Gender: Mixed
- Age range: 5-18
- Alumni: Old student union VMV

Visuvamadu Maha Vidyalayam is established in 1978 as a provincial school in Visuvamadu, Sri Lanka. School girls studying in this school were among those killed in the Chencholai bombing.

== See also ==
- List of schools in Northern Province, Sri Lanka
