= Mullaitivu Maha Vidyalayam =

School in Northern Province, Sri Lanka

Mullaitivu M.V.
- முல்லைத்தீவு ம.வி.
- Mullaitivu, Mullaitivu District, Northern Province; Sri Lanka

Information
- School type: Public provincial 1AB
- School district: Mullaitivu Education Zone
- Authority: Northern Provincial Council
- School number: 1401001
- Teaching staff: 21
- Grades: 1-13
- Gender: Mixed
- Age range: 5-18

Mullaitivu Maha Vidyalayam (Tamil: முல்லைத்தீவு மகா வித்தியாலயம் Mullaittīvu Makā Vittiyālayam) is a provincial school in Mullaitivu, Sri Lanka. School girls studying in this school were among those killed in the Chencholai bombing.

== See also ==
- List of schools in Northern Province, Sri Lanka
