= Ramanathapuram West Government Tamil Mixed School =

Provincial school in Northern Province, Sri Lanka

Ramanathapuram West G.T.M.S.
- இராமநாதபுரம் மேற்கு அ.த.க.பா.
- Vaddakkachchi, Kilinochchi District, Northern Province; Sri Lanka

Information
- School type: Public provincial 2
- School district: Kilinochchi Education Zone
- Authority: Northern Provincial Council
- School number: 1101010
- Teaching staff: 24
- Grades: 1-11
- Gender: Mixed
- Age range: 5-16

Ramanathapuram West Government Tamil Mixed School (Tamil: இராமநாதபுரம் மேற்கு அரசினர் தமிழ் கலவன் பாடசாலை Irāmanātapuram Mēṟku Araciṉar Tamiḻ Kalavaṉ Pāṭacālai) is a provincial school in Vaddakkachchi, Sri Lanka.

== See also ==
- List of schools in Northern Province, Sri Lanka
