= Saiva (disambiguation) =

Saiva or Shaiva may refer to:

- Saiva is a genus of Asian lanternbugs, family Fulgoridae.
- Saiva kurukkals redirects to Vellalar, which were the nobility, aristocracy of the ancient Tamil order.
- Shaiva Siddhanta or Saiva-Siddhanta, provides the normative rites, cosmology and theological categories of tantric Saivism.
- Shaivism or Saivism is one of the four most widely followed sects of Hinduism.
- Saiva Neri [The saiva way] , part of the Tirumurai, a twelve-volume collection of Tamil Śaiva devotional poetry.
- Urumpirai Saiva Tamil Vidyalayam is a provincial school in Urumpirai, Sri Lanka.
- The Saiva Agamas are a subset of the Agamas.
- The Saiva revivalism promoted by Arumugam Pillai.
- The Saiva Siddhanta Church is a spiritual institution and identifies itself with the Śaivite Hindu religion.
- The South India Saiva Siddhanta Works Publishing Society Ltd. (also known as Kazhagam) is a Tamil book publishing company.
