= Vavuniya Muslim Maha Vidyalayam =

Public national school in Sri Lanka

Vavuniya Muslim M.V.

Location
- Mannar Road; Paddanichchipuliyankulam, Vavuniya, Vavuniya District, Northern Province; Sri Lanka
- Coordinates: 8°45′48.70″N 80°28′57.60″E

Information
- School type: Public national 1C
- School district: Vavuniya South Education Zone
- Authority: Ministry of Education
- School number: 1302003
- Teaching staff: 33
- Grades: 1-13
- Gender: Mixed
- Age range: 5-18

Vavuniya Muslim Maha Vidyalayam is a national school in Vavuniya, Sri Lanka.

== See also ==
- List of schools in Northern Province, Sri Lanka
