= Kumulamunai Maha Vidhyalayam =

Public provincial school in Sri Lanka

Kumulamunai M V
- Kumulamunai, Mullaitivu District, Northern Province; Sri Lanka

Information
- School type: Public provincial 1AB
- School district: Mullaitivu Education Zone
- Authority: Northern Provincial Council
- School number: 1401006
- Grades: 1-13
- Gender: Mixed

Kumulamunai Maha Vidhyalayam is a provincial school in Kumulamunai, Mullaitivu District, Sri Lanka. School girls studying in this school were among those killed in the Chencholai bombing.

== See also ==
- List of schools in Northern Province, Sri Lanka
