= Sri Ramakrishna College, Akkaraipattu =

School in Eastern Province, Sri Lanka

Sri Ramakrishna College

Location
- Alayadivembu Road; Akkaraipattu, Ampara District, SriLanka, Eastern Province; Sri Lanka
- Coordinates: 7°12′58.10″N 81°50′46.90″E

Information
- School type: Public national 1AB
- School district: Akkaraipattu Education Zone
- Authority: Ministry of Education
- Principal: David Amirthalingam
- Principal: C. Ganeshan
- Grades: 6-11

Sri Ramakrishna College, located in Akkaraipattu, Sri Lanka, is a prominent national school known for its educational programs and community involvement. The college serves students from various backgrounds and emphasizes a comprehensive approach to learning in the Ampara District within the Eastern Province of Sri Lanka.

== See also ==
- List of schools in Eastern Province, Sri Lanka
