= Achchuveli Central College =

Location
- Point Pedro Road; Achchuveli, Jaffna District, Northern Province; Sri Lanka; 9°46′36.90″N 80°06′54.50″E

Information
- School type: Public provincial 1C
- Authority: Northern Provincial Council
- School number: 1009001
- Teaching staff: 36
- Grades: 1-13
- Gender: Mixed
- Age range: 5-18
- Enrollment: 1,184
- Language: Tamil
- Website: jacc.sch.lk

Achchuveli Central College (also known as Achchuveli Maha Vidyalayam) is a provincial school in Achchuveli, Sri Lanka.

== See also ==
- List of schools in Northern Province, Sri Lanka
