= Wariyapola Sri Sumangala College =

School in Kandy, Sri Lanka

Wariyapola Sri Sumangala College, Kandy
- වාරියපොල ශ්‍රී සුමංගල විද්‍යාලය, මහනුවර
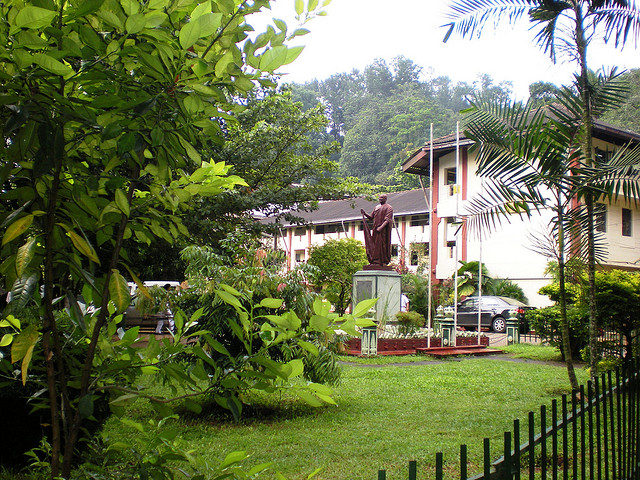
- Wariyapola Sri Sumangala College

Location
- Kandy, Central Province; Sri Lanka; 7°17′52.6″N 80°37′55.6″E

Information
- Former name: St. Paul’s College, St. Paul's English School
- School type: National / Public 1AB
- Motto: Pali: නත්ථි පඤ්ඤ සමා ආභා Naththi Pangngä Samä Abha (There is no Light like Wisdom)
- Religious affiliation: Buddhist
- Established: 16 September 1879 (147 years ago)
- School district: Kandy
- Educational authority: Sri Lanka Education Department
- School code: 03388
- Principal: Deshappriya Rathnayake
- Staff: 180+
- Grades: 1 - 13
- Gender: Boys
- Age range: 6 to 19
- Enrolment: 4500+
- Education system: National Education System
- Language: Sinhala, English
- Schedule: 7:30 AM - 1:30 PM (SLST)
- Houses: Parakum, Gamunu, Thissa, Vijaya
- Colours: Navy blue, sky blue, gold
- Athletics: Yes
- Sports: Yes
- Nickname: Nerians
- Abbreviation: WSSCK
- Website: sumangalacollegekandy.lk//

Wariyapola Sri Sumangala College, Kandy (Sinhala: වාරියපොල ශ්‍රී සුමංගල විද්‍යාලය මහනුවර) is a boys' school in Kandy, Sri Lanka

== History ==
The school, one of the oldest in Kandy, was established on 16 September 1879, as St. Paul's College, a junior school branch of Trinity College, Kandy. It was renamed St Paul's English School in 1987. In 1991 the school was renamed to Wariyapola Sri Sumangala College and relocated to the present site.

The college has been playing cricket since 1994 and has a long standing cricket rivalry with Sri Rahula College.

== See also ==
- List of schools in Central Province, Sri Lanka
