= Chenkalady Central College =

Public provincial school in Eastern Province, Sri Lanka

Location
- Trincomalee Road; Chenkalady, Batticaloa District, Eastern Province; Sri Lanka
- Coordinates: 7°47′10.90″N 81°35′25.90″E

Information
- School type: Public provincial 1AB
- School district: Kalkudah Education Zone
- Authority: Eastern Provincial Council
- Grades: Class 1 - 13
- Gender: Boys and Girls

Chenkalady Central College is a provincial school in Chenkalady, Sri Lanka.

== See also ==
- List of schools in Eastern Province, Sri Lanka
