= St. Xavier's College, Nuwara Eliya =

St Xavier's College, Nuwara Eliya
- 'ශාන්ත සේවියර් විදුහල , නුවරඑළී'ය, புனித ஸவெரியர் கல்லூரி நுவர எலிய
- Sancti Xavier Collegii
- Long Street; Nuwara Eliya, Central; Sri Lanka

Information
- Type: National school
- Motto: Original motto: AD VERITATEM ET CARITAS TOWARD TRUTH AND CHARITY; Present motto: DEUS VERITAS CARITAS GOD TRUTH CHARITY
- Religious affiliations: Roman Catholic, formerly De La Salle Confraternity
- Patron saint: St Francis Xavier 1506-1552
- Established: 1859 as the Parish School
- Founder: Rev. Fr. John Peter Perreard and Rev. Fr. Adrian Bernard Doffo
- Status: Boys 1AB College
- Sister school: Good Shepherd Convent
- School board: Ministry of Education,Sri Lanka
- School district: Nuwara Eliya
- Authority: Ministry of Education
- Category: Primary & Secondary
- Authorizer: Ministry of Education and the Bishop of Kandy(Proprietor)
- Superintendent: Director of Education
- Specialist: Formal Sri Lankan Education
- Session: 3 terms a year
- President: Principal - parish priest
- Rector: Rectors from 1859-1958, Bro. Director 1958-1962 Principal from 1962
- Director: DE
- Principal: Appointed by the state - Qualification SLPS Grade 1
- Headmaster: Sectional Heads for Sinhala, Tamil and English streams
- Head of school: Principal-Mr.Mathew Oaulraj (SLPS II)
- Chaplain: The Parish Priest of St Xavier's Church Nuwara Eliya
- Staff: Appointed by the Ministry of Education
- Grades: Grade 1 to Advanced Level Sihala Medium (Commerce and Arts) Tamil Medium Bio Science
- Years offered: 5-16
- Gender: Boys
- Age: 5 to 16
- Enrollment: 750
- Language: Sinhala, Tamil and English language (formerly Latin_
- Houses: Pagnani (blue with white cross), Beckmeyer (maroon with white cross), Regno (gold with white cross)
- Colours: College Colours- Maroon ,Blue and Gold
- Slogan: God, Truth, Charity
- Sports: Athletics, cricket, football, basketball, table tennis, badminton, hockey, boxing, elle
- Mascot: Blessings of the Patron St Francis Xavier
- Nickname: Xaverians
- Rival: Holy Trinity College and Gamini Central College
- Accreditation: Formerly the De La Salle Fraternity
- Publication: Perspective
- School fees: Non-fee levying
- Alumni: SXCOBA founded in 1947
- Website: stxaviers.vacau.com

St Xavier's College, Nuwara Eliya is a boys' public national school in Nuwara Eliya, Sri Lanka.

== See also ==
- List of schools in Central Province, Sri Lanka
- List of Jesuit sites
