= Dharmadutha College, Badulla =

Dharmadutha College ධර්මදූත විද්‍යාලය

Location
- Badulla, Uva; Sri Lanka
- Coordinates: 6°59′12″N 81°3′38″E

Information
- Former name: English Buddhist School
- School type: Government
- Motto: Sinhala: පඤ්ඤා නරානං රතනං
- Religious affiliation(s): Buddhism
- Established: c. 1891
- Founder: Henry Steel Olcott
- Educational authority: Ministry of Education
- Principal: H. M. Senarath Bandara
- Grades: 1 -13
- Enrollment: 2150
- Language: English, Sinhala
- Houses: Kotelawala; Gunawardana; Jayasingha; Disanayaka
- Color(s): Maroon, black and white
- Song: "Sinhala: සව්සිරිනී සපිරී උතුම් වු"
- Alumni name: Old Duthians
- Website: https://dharmaduthacollege.lk/

Dharmadutha College (Sinhala: ධර්මදූත විද්‍යාලය), is a national Buddhist school in Badulla, Sri Lanka. It was established as the English Buddhist School by Colonel Henry Steel Olcott in 1891. The school was registered as a government-benefited School in 1984.

The annual big match between Dharmadutha College and Uva College, known as the "Battle of Uva" has been played since in 1920, and is the college's most important sporting encounter for the school year.
