= Varany Maha Vidyalayam =

Varany central college
- வரணி

Location
- varany iyattalai Varany, Jaffna District, Northern Province; Sri Lanka; 9°43′10.10″N 80°13′31.10″E

Information
- School type: Public provincial 1C
- School district: Thenmarachchi Education Zone
- Authority: Northern Provincial Council
- School number: 1003008
- Teaching staff: 46
- Grades: 6-13
- Gender: Mixed
- Age range: 11-19

Varany Central College (Tamil: வரணி மத்திய கல்லூரி Varany Central College) is a provincial school in Varany, Sri Lanka.

Locating the school at Varany was due to the untiring efforts of V. Sithamparanathan who was a towering figure at Varany Village Council for 30 years, the last 18 as Chairman. Constructing a secondary school in the southern part of Thenmaradchi District was mooted by V. Kumarasamy the then Member of Parliament for Chavakachcheri, with a decision resulting in selecting Kodikamam as the venue. Even construction materials began arriving at the site when Mr. Sithamparanathan took it upon himself as a crusader to build the secondary school at Varany instead.

Kodikamam is located at a main railway station with good road and rail access to established schools in Chavakachcheri, only 5 miles away. Even better schools in Jaffna town were equally accessible by rail or road to students in that vicinity.

Such was not the case with Varany, a village of much larger land area with a predominantly agrarian base. For historical reasons such as resisting educational developments based on religious lines, Varany residents did not take to western education like the rest of the peninsula. When the winds of change blew a bit harder, it became apparent to leaders like Mr. Sithamparanathan that unless education was built into the future fabric of life, Varany residents would be left behind.

There were several vernacular and primary schools in the village, including the American Mission Tamil Mixed School which was built through the philanthropy of Mr. Sithamparanathan himself, partly as a compromise for not allowing the construction of a secondary school in Varany by the missionaries who then took the project to Udupiddy in the form of the current Udupiddy American Mission College.

Students from Varany had to trek long distances by foot to get to the main road, take buses or vans to either Point Pedro or to Kodikamam and take another bus or van to Chavakachcheri if they aspired to higher education. A few would even go further to schools in the Jaffna town enduring even more hardship. Locating a secondary school in a location central to the Village Council's boundaries so that the catchment is equitably served in terms of travel distance was a key consideration. The visionaries of the time would have been very pleased to see the fruits of their labour in ample supply as evidenced in the publication of the school's 50th Anniversary Commemoration in 2004.

== See also ==
- List of schools in Northern Province, Sri Lanka
