= Matale Hindu College =

School located in Matale district, Sri Lanka

- Central Province; Sri Lanka

Information
- Religious affiliation: Hinduism
- Gender: Boys

Matale Hindu College is a national Tamil boys' school located in the Central province of Sri Lanka (Mandandawela), Matale).
