= Yarlton College =

- யாழ்ற்ரன் கல்லூரி

Location
- Alady; Karainagar, Jaffna District, Northern Province; Sri Lanka; 9°44′35.10″N 79°52′18.80″E

Information
- School type: Public provincial 1AB
- School district: Islands Education Zone
- Authority: Northern Provincial Council
- School number: 1005020
- Principal: Mr.T Mathivathanagn
- Teaching staff: 47
- Grades: 1-13
- Gender: Mixed
- Age range: 5-18

Yarlton College (Tamil: யாழ்ற்ரன் கல்லூரி Yāḻṟraṉ Kallūri) is a provincial school in Karainagar, Sri Lanka.

== See also ==
- List of schools in Northern Province, Sri Lanka
