= Velautham Maha Vidyalayam =

Velautham M.V.
- வேலாயுதம் ம.வி.

Location
- Main Street; Point Pedro, Jaffna District, Northern Province; Sri Lanka
- Coordinates: 9°49′16.60″N 80°14′13.80″E

Information
- School type: Public provincial 1AB
- Opened: August 7, 1895; 130 years ago
- Founder: V. Velautham
- School district: Vadamarachchi Education Zone
- Authority: Northern Provincial Council
- School number: 1007028
- Principal: K. Niththiyananthan
- Teaching staff: 28
- Grades: 6-13
- Gender: Boys
- Age range: 5-18

Velautham Maha Vidyalayam (Tamil: வேலாயுதம் மகா வித்தியாலயம் Vēlāyutam Makā Vittiyālayam) is a provincial school in Point Pedro, Sri Lanka.

== See also ==
- List of schools in Northern Province, Sri Lanka
