= Chavakachcheri Hindu College =

School in Northern Province, Sri Lanka

- சாவகச்சேரி இந்துக் கல்லூரி

Location
- Kandy Road, Chavakachcheri; Changaththanai; Chavakachcheri, Jaffna District, Sri Lanka, Jaffna, Northern Province; Sri Lanka; 9°39′53.00″N 80°10′22.20″E

Information
- School type: Public national 1AB
- Motto: Nalame naduka
- Founded: 1904
- Founder: Thamodharampillai
- School district: Thenmarachchi Education Zone
- Authority: Ministry of Education
- School number: 1003002
- Principal: N. Saruveswaran
- Staff: 130
- Teaching staff: 122
- Grades: 6-13
- Gender: Mixed
- Age range: 5-18
- Enrollment: 2,152 (2023)
- Website: chc.sch.lk

Chavakachcheri Hindu College (Tamil: சாவகச்சேரி இந்துக் கல்லூரி Cāvakaccēri Intuk Kallūri, CHC) is a national school in Chavakachcheri, Sri Lanka.

== History ==
The Saiva Tamil Mixed School was founded by Thamodharampillai near the Chavakachcheri Market in 1904. This school transferred to Changaththanai (Sankaththanai) in 1905. An English medium stream was established in 1921 by the founder. In 1922 the school was handed over to the Management of the Jaffna Hindu management Board and renamed Chavakachcheri Hindu College. The school was awarded 'C', 'B' and 'A' grades in the years 1934, 1945 and 1949 respectively. It was promoted to that of a national school in 1993.

== See also ==
- Category:Alumni of Chavakachcheri Hindu College
- List of schools in Northern Province, Sri Lanka
