= Ave Maria Convent Branch School =

Bolawalana Ave Maria Convent, Negombo
- බෝලවලාන ආවේ මරියා කන්‍යාරාමය
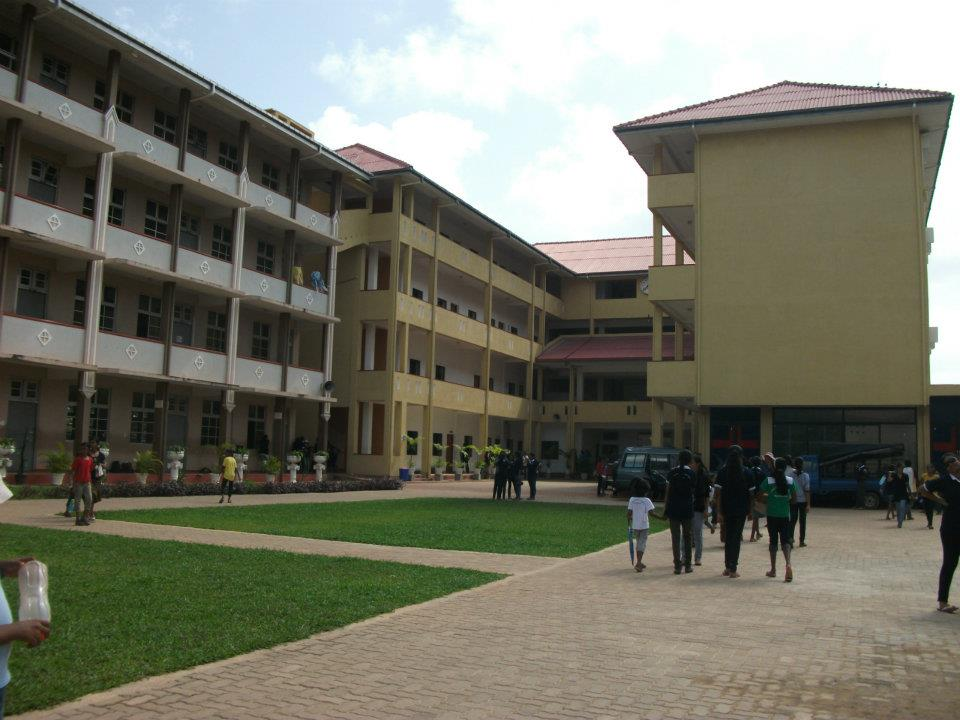

Location
- Akkarapanaha, Negombo, Sri Lanka; Negombo, Western, 11500; Sri Lanka
- Coordinates: 7.19989°N 79.86293°E

Information
- Former name: Ave Maria Convent Branch School
- School type: Private School
- Motto: In Thy Light !!
- Religious affiliation: Roman Catholic
- Patron saint: Mother Mary
- Established: 1999
- Status: Open
- Sister school: Ave Maria Convent, Negombo
- Principal: Rev.Sr.Sirima Opanayake
- Gender: Female
- Enrollment: 1560
- Classes: Gr.1 - G.C.E. Advanced Level
- Average class size: 40
- Student to teacher ratio: 40:1
- Language: Sinhalese & English
- Houses: Masson, Solange, Andrew, Coudert
- Colours: Blue & White
- School Magazine: "The Ave Marian"
- School Anthem: "Let Us Raise.."
- Alumni Association: Past Pupils' Association of Bolawalana Ave Maria Convent
- Website: www.bolawalanaamc.com

Bolawalana Ave Maria Convent (BAMC) , previously known as Ave Maria Convent Branch School is a Catholic girls' school in Sri Lanka. The school is administrated by the Dominican sisters of Malta. There are classes from Grade 1 up to G.C.E. Advanced Level. The school was branched off from Ave Maria Convent, Negombo, and accepted as an independent school in 2014

== History ==
The first foundation stone for the Ave Maria branch school was laid on 14 June 1998 by his excellency Nicholas Marcus Fernando the former archbishop of Colombo. The ceremonial opening was held on 10 January 1999. Ave Maria Convent branch school is a Catholic school with particular emphasis on Christian values and attitudes. The foundation stone was laid to the second school building by Rev.Sr Anita Fernando, the provincial superior of the congregation of Good Shepherd sisters on 19 April 2002, and Rev. Fr. Lesley Fernando. In 2005 next foundation stone for the building of comfort station was laid. Today there are nearly 1100 students studying at Ave Maria Branch School.

== Principals ==
Name	Year(s)	Remarks
Rev. Sr. Nilani Silva (Good Shepherd's Convent)	1999 to 2005	The Founding Principal/ Sectional Head
Rev. Sr. Sirima Opanayake (Dominican Sisters of Malta)	Since 2005	

== The Present Principal ==
Rev. Sr. Sirima Opanayake took the office in 2004 succeeding Rev.Sr. Nilani Fernando the founding principal. She was born on 26 August 1956 in Tudella. She studied at Christ King College, Tudella. She obtained the master's degree in Religious Education at the Regina Mundi Pontifical Institute, Rome, Italy. She entered into religious life on 30 August 1981 in Malta, through the congregation of "The Dominican Sisters of Malta". As for professional qualifications, she obtained the Diploma on spirituality and Counseling in Rome.

== Primary Section ==
There are grade 1 to grade 5 in Sinhalese medium, 3 classes for each grade. The student learns a basic education in primary ages following Sri Lankan Syllabus. They learn mathematics, Sinhalese(as mother language), English, Tamil (as a second language) and environmental studies. The primary sectional head is Mrs. Thushari Fernando.

== See also ==
- Lists of schools in Sri Lanka
