= Meesalai Veerasingam Maha Vidyalayam =

Meesalai Veerasingam Central College
- மீசாலை வீரசிங்கம் மத்திய கல்லூரி.

Location
- Kandy Road; Meesalai, Jaffna District, Northern Province; Sri Lanka; 9°40′41.90″N 80°11′52.80″E

Information
- School type: Public provincial 1AB
- Motto: அரிய என்று ஆகாத இல்லை (Nothing is impossible)
- Founded: 1926
- Founder: Mr Veerasingam
- School district: Thenmarachchi Education Zone
- Authority: Northern Provincial Council
- School number: 1003005
- Principal: T. Ampalavanar
- Teaching staff: 52
- Grades: 1-13
- Gender: Mixed
- Age range: 5-18

Meesalai Veerasingam Maha Vidyalayam (Tamil: மீசாலை வீரசிங்கம் மகா வித்தியாலயம் Mīcālai Vīraciṅkam Makā Vittiyālayam, also known as Meesalai Veerasingam Central College மீசாலை வீரசிங்கம் மத்திய கல்லூரி) is a provincial school in Meesalai, Sri Lanka.

== See also ==
- List of schools in Northern Province, Sri Lanka
