= Mahajana College, Batticaloa =

School in Batticaloa, Sri Lanka

Mahajana College

Location
- Batticaloa, Batticaloa District, Eastern Province; Sri Lanka
- Coordinates: 7°43′12.10″N 81°42′05.60″E

Information
- School type: Public provincial 1C
- School district: Batticaloa Education Zone
- Authority: Eastern Provincial Council
- Principal: N. Durairajasingam

Mahajana College is a provincial school in Batticaloa, Sri Lanka.

== History ==
The school was founded in 1875 by Rev. John Hilner. It was changed some time later to a teachers training college, but in 1925 became Arasadi Methodist Mission Tamil Mixed School. Ten years later it was changed to the Mahajana College, but in 1962 the college came under the government's national policy, and became the Arasadi Tamil Mixed School. It was renamed Mahajana College in 1992.

The British Council of Sri Lanka honored the college in 2011 for providing a portfolio of evidence among the best ten submitted for the International School Award.

== Co-curricular activities ==
In 2016, students in the college's Environment Pioneer Student Group staged a World Environment Day "awareness walk" and street play to call attention to environmental protection. They also sold environmentally friendly bags to reduce the use of plastic bags.

The college hosted "Thinking Day—2013" to commemorate Girl Guide founders Lord Baden and Lady Olave Powell, presenting awards and badges to "those who helped the Girl Guide movement in the Batticaloa District". A symposium at the event included Senior Public Health Inspector P. Manokaran's talk on the "high incidence of breast and cervical cancer in Sri Lanka in the Batticaloa district" and he explained, "early detection of this was easy and is curable at the early stages".

== Events at the college ==
The Traditional Industries and Small Enterprise Development Ministry announced a cottage industry development programme in the Batticaloa district at Mahajana College, Batticaloa, in March 2012. The programme included, "grants, bank loans and to provide market access to the public in Batticaloa to start small industries under the programme, ministry sources said".

The college held "Divi Neguma National Exhibition" at Mahajana College, Batticaloa, in November 2014, to support small and traditional industries in the Eastern Province that had closed as a result of terrorism. These industries had been re-established to strengthen the economy of the area. Traditional Industries and Small Enterprise Development Minister Douglas Devenandar said these industries had flourished in the East making the area a hive of economic activity. According to the minister, "Divi Neguma" Programme would bring economic benefits to over one million family units.

In December 2015, the college celebrated with more than 270 participants (including special invitees, students and their parents) at a scholarships awarding ceremony to students who had "received a minimum 6 credits in one sitting with Maths". Speaker Rev. Fr. Rajeevan encouraged students who receive the award to "become helpers to others in the future".

== See also ==
- List of schools in Eastern Province, Sri Lanka
