= Saivapragasa Ladies' College =

- சைவப் பிரகாச மகளிர் கல்லூரி

Location
- Urban Council Road; Vavuniya, Vavuniya District, Northern Province; Sri Lanka
- Coordinates: 8°45′23.40″N 80°29′50.20″E

Information
- School type: Public provincial 1AB
- School district: Vavuniya South Education Zone
- Authority: Northern Provincial Council
- School number: 1302010
- Teaching staff: 95
- Grades: 1-13
- Gender: Girls with Boys
- Age range: 5-18

Saivapragasa Ladies' College (Tamil: சைவப் பிரகாச மகளிர் கல்லூரி Caivap Pirakāca Makaḷir Kallūri, also known as Saivapragasa Girls' College) is a provincial school in Vavuniya, Sri Lanka.

== See also ==
- List of schools in Northern Province, Sri Lanka
