= Sithivinayagar Vidyalayam =

- சித்திவிநாயகர் வித்தியாலயம்

Location
- V.M.V. Road; Point Pedro, Jaffna District, Northern Province; Sri Lanka
- Coordinates: 9°49′32.90″N 80°14′03.50″E

Information
- School type: Public provincial 2
- School district: Vadamarachchi Education Zone
- Authority: Northern Provincial Council
- School number: 1007014
- Teaching staff: 26
- Grades: 1-11
- Gender: Mixed
- Age range: 5-16

Sithivinayagar Vidyalayam (Tamil: சித்திவிநாயகர் வித்தியாலயம் Cittivināyakar Vittiyālayam) is a provincial school in Point Pedro, Sri Lanka.

== See also ==
- List of schools in Northern Province, Sri Lanka
