= Royal Central College, Polonnaruwa =

Royal College Polonnaruwa
- රාජකීය මධ්‍ය මහා විද්‍යාලයය

Location
- New Town; Polonnaruwa; Sri Lanka; 7°55′10.70″N 81°00′11.50″E

Information
- School type: Public national 1AB
- Motto: පමා නොවවු (Pama nowau) (Be punctual)
- Founded: 19 April 1959
- Founder: C. P. De Silva
- School district: Polonnaruwa Education Zone
- Authority: Ministry of Education
- Grades: 1-13
- Gender: Mixed
- Age range: 5-18
- Colour: Maroon
- Website: Official website

Royal College Polonnaruwa (Sinhala: රාජකීය මධ්‍ය මහා විද්‍යාලයය; also known as Royal Central College - Polonnaruwa, Polonnaruwa Rajakeeya Madya Maha Vidyalaya, Polonnaruwa Royal, Royal Polonnaruwa or Polonnaruwa Royal College) is a national school in Polonnaruwa, Sri Lanka.

== History ==
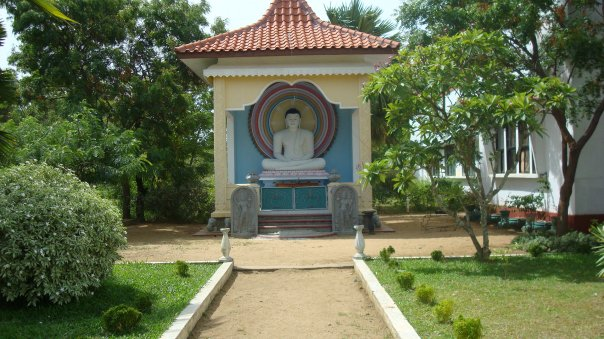
Budu madura

Royal Central College was founded by government minister C. P. de Silva on the lines of the Royal College, Colombo. Silva laid the foundation stone of the school on 19 April 1959. Six years later the school was opened for local children. Scholarships were offered to students in Polonnaruwa and Trincomalee districts. The main objective of the school was to give proper educational opportunities for the children of farmers. The school also owned 54 acres (220,000 m^{2}) of land and paddy fields and the income from these was used to fund the school. At the beginning students were recruited to grade 9 and upwards. Students were selected for art, commerce, and science classes by scholarship examination in grade 8. D. B. Karunathilaka was the school's first principal and R. W. Galahitiyawa was the vice principal. The school had around 22 staff in 1965.

The school was closed in 1971 due to the JVP insurrection. It became a rehabilitation camp. No education was carried out at the school for three years. Instead, commerce classes were held in the irrigation office and science classes was held at Topawewa School.

== Notable alumni ==
Below is a list of notable alumni of Royal Central College, Polonnaruwa

Name	Notability	Reference
Maithripala Sirisena	President of Sri Lanka (2015–present, member of Parliament - Polonnaruwa (1989–2015)	

== See also ==
- List of schools in North Central Province, Sri Lanka
