= Mallavi Central College =

Location
- Thunukkai Road, Yogapuram; Mallavi, Mullaitivu District, Northern Province; Sri Lanka
- Coordinates: 9°08′27.80″N 80°17′43.20″E

Information
- School type: Public provincial 1AB
- School district: Thunukkai Education Zone
- Authority: Northern Provincial Council
- School number: 1403001
- Teaching staff: 55
- Grades: 1-13
- Gender: Mixed
- Age range: 5-18

Mallavi Central College is a provincial school in Mallavi, Sri Lanka.

== See also ==
- List of schools in Northern Province, Sri Lanka
