= Maliyadeva Adarsha Maha Vidyalaya =

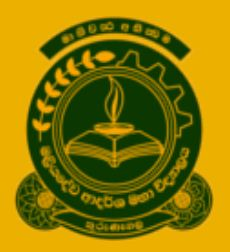

Location
- Kurunegala; Sri Lanka; 7°28′38″N 80°21′18″E

Information
- Type: Public
- Established: 27 February 1978
- Principal: Major Y.K.Kumarathanna
- Staff: 200
- Grades: Class 1 - 13
- Gender: Mix
- Age: 6 to 19
- Enrollment: 7000+
- Language: Sinhala, English
- Colours: Red, yellow, blue and green
- Affiliation: Buddhist
- Website: maliyadevaadarsha.com

Maliyadeva Adarsha Maha Vidyalaya is a Buddhist mixed school in Sri Lanka, located in the North Western Province, Sri Lanka.

The school currently has a student population of over 7000+ and a staff of nearly 200 teachers. The classes are held from grade 1 to grade 13.

== History ==
On 27 February 1978, school, then known as "Maliyadewa Adarsha Prathamika Vidyalaya“, opened with 123 pupils. In 1982 the school renamed “Maliyadewa Adarsha Kanishta Vidyalaya”. In 1987 the first batch of students sat for the O/L exams, with more than 91% passing. Then in 1988 A/L classes were started in all streams at once, and the school was renamed “Maha Vidyalaya”.

== Education and Classes ==
The school conducts 95 classes which are divided into three types

=== Primary Section ===
Primary Section currently have about 25 Classes. Grade 1 To 5 is Primary section.

=== Special education unit ===
This unit consist about 4 classes, which provide education to student with special needs.

=== Grade 6 to Grade 11 Section ===
This section currently has about 42 classes. And this section Consist Some Computer Lab and Science Lab too

=== A/L Section ===
- Science Section
- Commerce Section
- Arts Section

== Houses ==
The students are divided into four houses according to their admission numbers. House names are derived from the past kings in Sri Lanka.

- Thissa - Green colour
- Mahasen- Red colour
- Gemunu - Yellow colour
- Parakum- Blue Colour

In the inter house sport meet the houses compete to win inter house games.

== Past principals ==
- D. C. Ranasinghe
- R. M. Jayawardana
- T. B. Siriwardana
- H. M. K. Banda
- K. A. D. T. Wijerathna
- H. M. Chandrasekara
- R. M. Gunasekara
- D. M. Thilakaratahna
- Somarathna Dasanayaka
- S. S. A. Amarasena
- W. M. Wasala Karunarathna
- S.M.D.U.Bandara

== Battle of the Tuskers ==
The Battle of the Tuskers is an annual one day cricket encounter played between Maliyadeva Adarsha Maha Vidyalaya and Ibbagamuawa Central College at the Welagedara Stadium, Kurunegala.

The big match was not played in certain years for various reasons and was restarted in 2018.

== See also ==
- Kurunegala
- Lists of schools in Sri Lanka
- List of schools in North Western Province, Sri Lanka
