= Vipulananda Central College =

Location
- Karaitivu, Ampara District, Eastern Province; Sri Lanka
- Coordinates: 7°47′10.90″N 81°35′25.90″E

Information
- School type: Public provincial 1AB
- School district: Kalmunai Education Zone
- Authority: Eastern Provincial Council

Vipulananda Central College is a provincial school in Karaitivu, Sri Lanka.

== See also ==
- List of schools in Eastern Province, Sri Lanka
