= Urumpirai Saiva Tamil Vidyalayam =

- உரும்பிராய் சைவத்தமிழ் வித்தியாலயம்

Location
- Urumpirai, Jaffna District, Northern Province; Sri Lanka; 9°43′18.80″N 80°02′41.90″E

Information
- School type: Public provincial 2
- School district: Jaffna Education Zone
- Authority: Northern Provincial Council
- School number: 1009016
- Principal: M. Vickneswaran
- Teaching staff: 43
- Grades: 1-11
- Gender: Mixed
- Age range: 5-16

Urumpirai Saiva Tamil Vidyalayam (Tamil: உரும்பிராய் சைவத்தமிழ் வித்தியாலயம் Urumpirāy Caivattamiḻ Vittiyālayam) is a provincial school in Urumpirai, Sri Lanka.

== See also ==
- List of schools in Northern Province, Sri Lanka
