= Sithivinayagar Hindu College =

Location
- Uppukulam; Mannar, Mannar District, Northern Province, 42000; Sri Lanka; 8°58′44.10″N 79°54′58.10″E

Information
- School type: Public national 1AB
- School district: Mannar Education Zone
- Authority: Ministry of Education
- School number: 1201001
- Teaching staff: 50
- Grades: 1-13
- Gender: Mixed
- Age range: 5-18

Sithivinayagar Hindu College is a national school in Mannar, Sri Lanka.

== See also ==
- List of schools in Northern Province, Sri Lanka
