= Kilinochchi Maha Vidyalayam =

School in Northern Province, Sri Lanka

- கிளிநொச்சி மகா வித்தியாலயம்

Location
- Kilinochchi, Kilinochchi District, Northern Province; Sri Lanka
- Coordinates: 9°23′41.30″N 80°24′35.90″E

Information
- School type: Public provincial 1AB
- Motto: கற்க கசடற (learn properly and thoroughly)
- Founded: July 29, 1927; 98 years ago
- Founder: Sir Pon. Ramanathan
- School district: Kilinochchi Education Zone
- Authority: Northern Provincial Council
- School number: 1101013
- Principal: Mrs. Ilaventhi Nirmalaraj
- Teaching staff: 60
- Grades: 1-13
- Gender: Mixed
- Age range: 5-18
- Classes: 1-13
- School fees: Free

Kilinochchi Maha Vidyalayam (Tamil: கிளிநொச்சி மகா வித்தியாலயம் Kiḷinocci Makā Vittiyālayam, formerly known as Kanista Maha Vidyalayam) is a provincial school in Kilinochchi, Sri Lanka.

== See also ==
- List of schools in Northern Province, Sri Lanka
