= Sri Shanmuga Hindu Ladies College =

National school in Trincomalee, Sri Lanka

Location
- Vidyalayam street Heart of the town Trincomalee, Trincomalee District, Eastern Province; Sri Lanka; 8°34′31.10″N 81°13′56.90″E

Information
- School type: Public national 1AB
- Motto: Awake, arise and stop not till the goal is reached (Vizhumin, ezhumin ilakkai adaiyum varai uzhaimin)
- Founded: 20 October 1923
- Founder: Mrs.Thangamma Shanmugampillai
- School district: Trincomalee Education Zone
- Authority: Ministry of Education
- Principal: Mrs.T.Hariharan

Sri Shanmuga Hindu Ladies College (also known as Trincomalee Ladies College or Trinco Ladies College) is a national school in Trincomalee, Sri Lanka.

== History ==
The school was founded on 20 October 1923 by Thangamma Shanmugampillai in memory of her husband Sittampalam Shanmugampillai. After her husband’s death in 1917 Ms Thangamma dedicated her entire life to the women's education. She started the school with twenty-three students when she was sixty years old. Later English section was started.

== See also ==
- List of schools in Eastern Province, Sri Lanka
