= Carmel Fatima College, Kalmunai =

Coordinates: 7.419028°N 81.821922°E

- கமு/கார்மேல் பற்றிமா கல்லூரி தேசிய பாடசாலை
- Kalmunai, Ampara District; Eastern Province; Sri Lanka

Information
- School type: National
- Motto: Luceat
- Founded: 1900
- Principal: Rev.Bro.S.E.Reginold FSC
- Teaching staff: 135
- Grades: Grade 1 - 13
- Gender: Co-education
- Enrolment: 4000
- Language: English and Tamil
- Colours: Blue and white
- Alumni: CFC Alumni Association
- Website: http://www.carmelfatimacollege.org/

Km/Carmel Fatima College is a national school in Ampara District, Sri Lanka. It was established as two separate schools, Carmel Convent and Fatima College in the early 20th century, and amalgamated into a single school in 1976.

== Administration ==
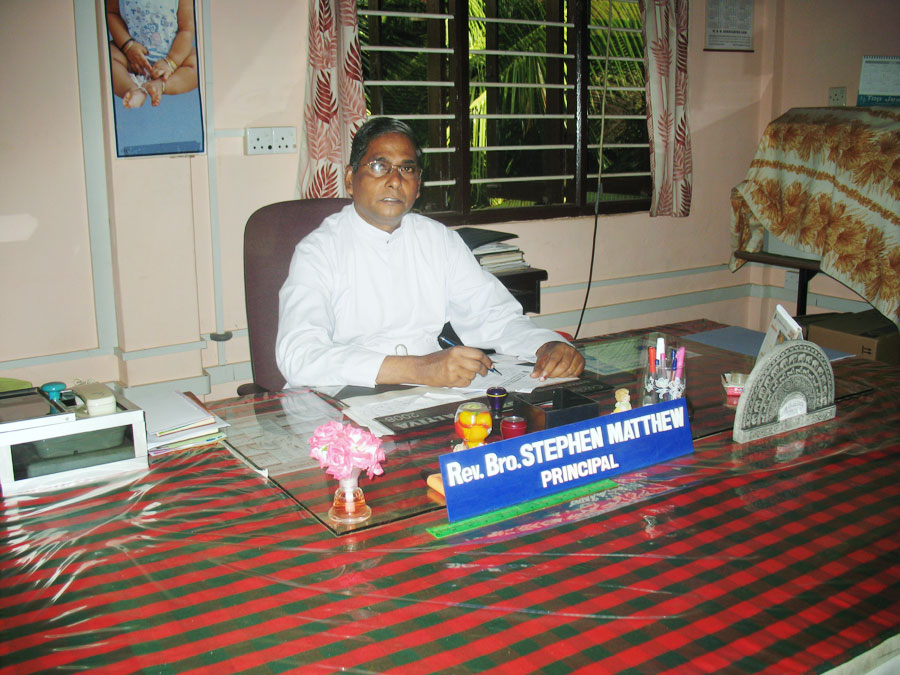
Rev.Bro.M.Stephen Mathew F.C - Principal of Carmel Fatima College Kalmunai

The principal is Rev. Bro. S.E. Reginold.

== History ==
=== Establishment ===
The Wesleyan Missionaries were the first to establish English medium education in the Kalmunai area. They administered up to 30 schools in the region in the early 20th century. After the period of the Wesleyan Missionaries, schools for English and Tamil education were established by Catholic Missionaries. St. Mary’s College, which was established at the premises of Sacred Heart Church, Kalmunai, was the pioneer of these Catholic schools. In addition to St. Mary’s College, an English-medium school for boys was established by the Catholic Missionaries. Later, in 1938, Reverend Brothers of St. Joseph’s Society took over this school, and they named it Fatima College in the 1950s.

Fatima College had fifteen graduates and two teachers who were trained in both English and Tamil language. They include two science graduates from South India. Reverend Brothers C.Chrysostom, S.M.Benjamin, M.Emmanuel, S.A.Francis, A.K.Patrick, A.R.Montine, J.M.Martin, and A.T.Alphorns played important roles in the development of the college. Sports activities were developed by Reverend Brothers J.A.Daniel and S.A.Gnanapragasam. Fatima College played in cricket and football matches with BT/St. Michael’s College annually during the times of these teachers. Rev.Bro.A.T.Alphorns beautified the school by maintaining a botanical garden and a zoological garden inside the school premises.

=== Establishment of Carmel High School ===
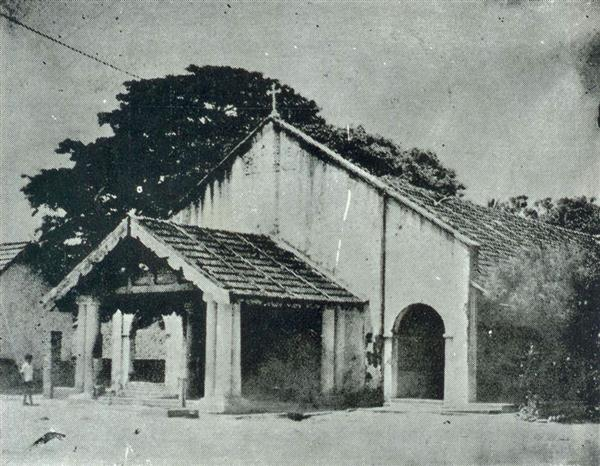
Carmel English School building

In 1922, Apostolic Carmelites Nuns came to Sri Lanka to provide their services. In July 1928 they established the Carmel Convent in Kalmunai. In 1958, Carmel High School was formed by amalgamating all their English and Tamil medium schools. Reverend Sisters M.Flentine, M.Algock, M.Lorinda, M.Dorothea, M.Dominica, M.Elaine, M.Frideswide, M.Judith, M.Odilia, M.Alphina, M.Lydoona, and M.Mabel worked hard for the development of Carmel High School. Rev.Sr.M.Dorothea played a major role in the development of the school as the principal for 17 years.

=== Amalgamation of Fatima College and Carmel High School ===
In the 1960s the government took over the schools. Schools were upgraded to High School and Central High School levels according to the student population. They were provided with GCE (A Level) and laboratory facilities with the upgrade.

Fatima College and Carmel High School were not able to gain these facilities from the government due to the lack of student population in both schools. To overcome the issue, Principals, School Development Society members, well-wishers and old students of both schools proposed the amalgamation of the two schools. They were amalgamated, and named as Carmel Fatima College. Rev.Bro.S.A.Francis was placed as the first principal of Carmel Fatima College. From September 1976, Rev.Sr.M.Mabel became the principal and Rev.Bro.J.M.Martin became the deputy principal. When Rev.Sr.Mabel retired, Rev.Bro.S.A.I.Mathew became the principal of Carmel Fatima College. Rev.Sr.M.Lorinda worked along with Rev.Bro.Mathew as the deputy principal for three years from 1978.

At the time Rev.Bro.Mathew became the principal of Carmel Fatima College, there were 1200 students and 45 teachers including 13 principal grade teachers in the school. In 1978, a laboratory building for GCE (O Level) students was built in the school, and was opened by the Prime Minister of Sri Lanka, R. Premadasa in October 1978.

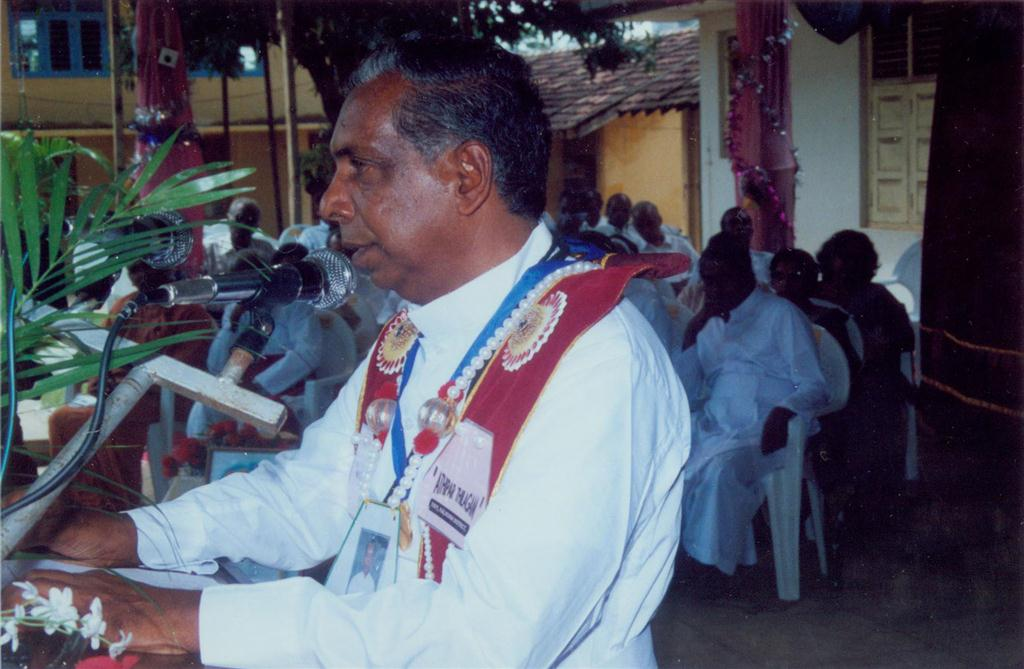
Rev. Bro. S.A.I. Mathew F.C

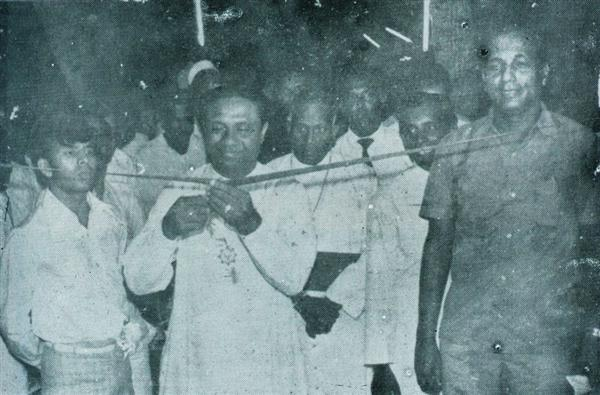
Lab opening 1978

=== Cyclone and recovery ===
A disastrous cyclone attacked the eastern coastal area of Sri Lanka on 23 November 1978. Carmel Fatima College suffered severe damage in the disaster. Carmel Convent building was also brought down by the cyclone; three students residing in the hostel died and many other students suffered injuries.

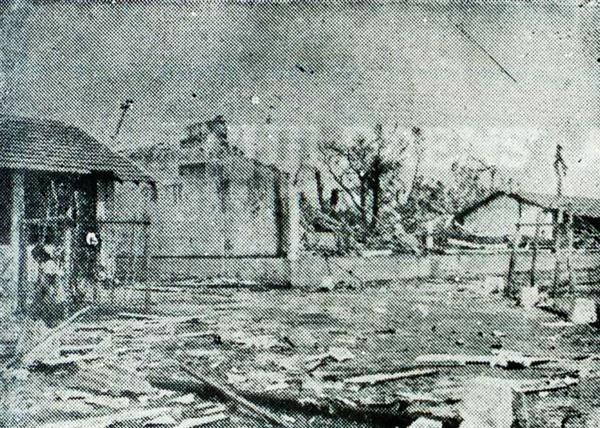
Glennie Hall damaged in cyclone

With 22 years of service, Rev.Bro.S.A.I.Mathew retired from his duty as the principal of Carmel Fatima College on 24 November 1999, his birthday. He bears the honor of upgrading the level of the school to a National School in 1993, and by the time he retired, almost 95 percent of the buildings remained in the school were either built or rebuilt by his effort.

In 1999, Rev.Bro.M.Stephen Mathew became principal of Carmel Fatima College. Now the school educates about 3000 to 3500 students every year, in which 400 of them are GCE (A Level) students. About 150 staff are employed in the school, including 120 teachers and 30 non-academic staff.
