= Pannawa =

- Town
- Interactive map of Pannawa
- Coordinates: 7°39′N 80°19′E
- Country: Sri Lanka
- Province: North Western Province
- District: Kurunegala District
- Elevation: 94 m (308 ft)
- Time zone: UTC+5:30 (Sri Lanka Standard Time)
- Postal code: 60410

Pannawa is a town in Kurunegala District, North Western Province, Sri Lanka. Pannawa is 94 m (308 ft) above sea level. Pannawa is near Kobeigana.

== Education ==
Schools in Pannawa include:

- Pannawa Muslim Central College
- As-Siraj MMV
- Sinhala Kanista Vidyalaya

== Climate ==
Pannawa has a tropical rainforest climate under the Köppen climate classification. The village's climate is tropical and hot throughout the year. The surrounding rocks play a major role in determining Pannawa's weather, since these rocks retain the heat of the day. During the month of April, the temperature can rise up to about 35 °C (95 °F). The only major change in Pannawa's weather occurs during the monsoons from May to August and October to January. This is the time of year during which heavy rains can be expected. While the city does experience a noticeably drier weather during January and February, it does not qualify as a true dry season because average precipitation in both months is above 60 millimetres (2.4 in). In general, temperatures from late November to mid-February are lower than temperatures during the rest of the year. The average annual rainfall in Pannawa is about 2,000 millimetres (79 in).

== Pannawa Lake ==
Pannawa Lake is a large man-made water reservoir constructed by ancient kings. The lake is located on the outskirts of the central business district near the Pannawa Jumma Mosque. The tank is also used as the village's water supply.
