= Jeelan Central College =

School in Sri Lanka

Coordinates: 6.74958°N 79.90320°E

Jeelan Central College, Panadura.
- Panadura; Sri Lanka

Information
- Type: 1AB
- Motto: Nasruminallah (Help from ALLAH)
- Established: 1906
- Founder: M. C. Siddi Lebbe, ILM.Abdul Azeez and A.M. Wapchie Marikar
- Principal: Mr. Haleem Majeed
- Grades: 1–13 (Tamil and English Medium)
- Gender: Boys and Girls
- Age: 6 to 19
- Colours: Green and yellow
- Song: Jeelan Children
- Publication: Jeelan Magazine,
- Former pupils: Real Jilanians
- Website: www.jeelan.sch.lk

Jeelan Central College, Panadura (commonly known as Panadura Jeelan Central College or simply as Jeelan) (Sinhala: ජිලාන් මධ්‍ය මහා විදුහල, Tamil: ஜீலான் மத்திய கல்லூரி, Arabic: جيلان) located in Panadura. It was founded in 1900 as Quran Madrasa by three of the most prominent Sri Lankan Muslims of the day, M. C. Siddi Lebbe I. L. M. Abdul Aziz and Arasi Marikar Wapchie Marikar, with the active patronage of Ahmed Orabi Pasha of Egypt. It is currently the largest Muslim educational institution in Sri Lanka with more than 2000 students studying there.
