= Learnium International School =

School in Sri Lanka

Learnium International School is located in Sri Lanka. It is an international school founded and run by Turkish and Sri Lankan citizens. One of the branches of Learnium is located in Rajagiriya and the other is in Ward Place. It is one of the most organized schools in Sri Lanka.
