= St. Mary's College, Hambantota =

Coordinates: 6°7′39″N 81°7′24″E

- Hambantota; Hambantota District; Sri Lanka

Information
- Established: 1905; 121 years ago
- Founder: Paul Coorman
- Principal: Ajith Samarasekara
- Grades: Class 1 - 13
- Gender: Mixed
- Age: 6 to 19
- Enrollment: 2000
- Colours: Blue, Yellow, and Red
- Website: www.smcht.sch.lk

St. Mary's College is a school in Hambantota. It started as an English medium school in the Hambantota Church, Sri Lanka, on 23 January 1905. It currently consists of over 2000 students and nearly 70 teachers, and caters to the needs of children studying primary and secondary level education. St. Mary's College was named a national school on 15 March 1994.

== History ==
St. Mary's School at Hambantota was established in 1903 by Rev. Fr. Paul Coorman, adjoining the church property, and he later purchased two blocks of land and extended the school. Coorman died of Cholera on 8 July 1919 and after his death, Rev. Fr. G. Van Austin took over as principal.

Later Rev. Fr. L. W. Wckramasighe took over the charge of the principal on 19 November 1919 and retired on 30 August 1931. During his time to complement the income to run the school, Wckramasighe bought 20 ha (50 acres) of paddy land at Goda-Koggala in 1940. Wckramasighe started to build a new hall for the English school towards end of 1951. However, he could not complete the construction, as he died on 31 January 1952. He had bought a good quantity of building materials and was able build the foundation and made provisions for the completion of the school hall. At his death, he left a last will appointing the bishop of Galle as its executor. He was succeeded by Rev. Fr. Joseph de Silva on 23 February 1952 as the parish priest of St Mary's church who completed the English school hall which was blessed by his lordship, Rt. Rev. Dr. N. M. Laudadio and declared open by Charles Edirisuriya, Member of Parliament on the 13 July 1953.

== See also ==
- Hambantota District
- Education in Sri Lanka
- National school (Sri Lanka)
