= Zahira College, Hambantota =

Coordinates: 6.12672°N 81.12495°E

Zahira College Hambantota
- Hambantota; Sri Lanka

Information
- Type: Public School
- Motto: Rabbi Zidni Ilma ("O Allah, increase us in knowledge!")
- Established: 11 January 1911
- Founder: Leonard Woolf
- Principal: Mr. Rizan (2017–present)
- Grades: 1–13 (Tamil Medium)
- Gender: Boys and Girls
- Age: 6 to 19
- Enrollment: over 8000
- Colour(s): Yellow & Maroon

Zahira College is a public school in Hambantota, Sri Lanka. It was founded in 1911 by Leonard Woolf and its first principal and teacher was Rathna Sabapathi.

== History ==
The school was founded as Tamil Mixed School on 23 January 1911, by Leonard Woolf, who was at the time the Assistant Government Agent of Hambantota District. It was the first Tamil medium school in the district and had only one teacher.

On 1 October 1914, the school's name was changed to the Government Tamil Mixed School. At this point there were 50 students and one teacher.

In 2004, the school building was destroyed by the Indian Ocean tsunami and was rebuilt with the aid of UNICEF.

== Partnerships ==
The college has partnered with Ermysted's Grammar School in England to collaborate in curricula such as environmental studies, geography, information technology, PSHCE, and art.

== Past principals ==
Name	From	To
T. V. Rathna Sabapathi	23 January 1911	10 June 1911
K. Thambi Raja	17 June 1911	21 March 1918
