= Rajakeeya Maha Vidyalaya, Telijjawila =

Royal College Telijjawila
- රාජකීය මහ විද්‍යාලය තෙලිජ්ජවිල

Location
- Telijjawila, Matara District, Southern Province; Sri Lanka; 6°01′18.80″N 80°29′27.30″E

Information
- School type: Public provincial 1C
- Founded: 1910
- School district: Akuressa Education Zone
- Authority: Southern Provincial Council
- Principal: Sisira K. Dheerasinghe
- Teaching staff: 110
- Grades: 1-13
- Gender: Mixed
- Age range: 5-18

Rajakeeya Maha Vidyalaya, Telijjawila (Sinhala: රාජකීය මහ විද්‍යාලය තෙලිජ්ජවිල; English: Royal Central College, Telijjawila also known as Royal College, Telijjawila or Telijjawila Royal College) is a provincial school in Telijjawila near Matara, Sri Lanka.

The first principal of the girls' section was Mrs. Lilie Samawathie Abeysekara, while the boys' section principal was Mr. Don Robert Dharmawardana. Principal Mr. P.B. Jinadasa renamed the school Rajakeeya Maha Vidyalaya-Telijjawila. At present, the school has a well-equipped library, a modern computer lab, an audio and video unit and commerce and arts sections for G.C.E (A/L). The student population is about 2,500, and has the largest number of student population in the Akuressa educational zone.

== See also ==
- List of schools in Southern Province, Sri Lanka
