= Vishaka Girls High School, Badulla =

Coordinates: 6.9914°N 81.0535°E

Vishaka Girls' High School, Badulla
- Badulla; Sri Lanka

Information
- Type: National School
- Established: 1892
- Founder: Methodist Mission
- Principal: Manohari Fonseka (2012)
- Grades: Grade 1 - 13
- Gender: Girls
- Website: Official Website

Vishaka Girls' High School is a girls' school in Badulla, Sri Lanka. It is a National School funded by the central government providing primary and secondary education.

== History ==
The school was established in 1892 as a private school by the Methodist Church in Sri Lanka as the Girls High School, Badulla. In 1963 the school was converted to a public school and in 1993 was upgraded to a national school.

== See also ==
- Education in Sri Lanka
