= Pannawa Muslim Central College =

Pannawa Muslim Central College பண்ணவ முஸ்லிம் மத்திய கல்லுரி

Location
- Pannawa; Sri Lanka
- Coordinates: 7°40′42″N 80°09′08″E

Information
- Type: Government school
- Established: 1959
- Grades: 1 - 13
- Gender: Co-educational
- Age: 6 to 19
- Affiliation: Muslim

Pannawa Muslim Central College (Tamil: பண்ணவா முஸ்லிம் மத்திய கல்லுரி), is a government school in Pannawa, Sri Lanka. It is one of Kurunegala's oldest schools, established in 1959. It is a Central College and currently has 600 students. The term "Pannawans" (Tamil:பன்னவன்ஸ்) is used to describe former and present pupils of the college.
