= Batticaloa Hindu College =

School in Eastern Province, Sri Lanka

Location
- Batticaloa, Batticaloa District, Eastern Province; Sri Lanka; 7°43′15.10″N 81°41′52.90″E

Information
- School type: Public provincial 1AB
- Founded: 1946
- School district: Batticaloa Education Zone
- Authority: Eastern Provincial Council

Batticaloa Hindu College (Tamil: மட்டக்களப்பு இந்து கல்லூரி) is a provincial school in Batticaloa, Sri Lanka.

== See also ==
- List of schools in Eastern Province, Sri Lanka
