= Dudley Senanayake Maha Vidyalaya =

Coordinates: 6.8906°N 79.8725°E

Dudley Senanayake College is situated in Park Road Close to Anderson Flats (Colombo 05, Sri Lanka). The school has nearly 2000 students. This school is popular for sports like cricket and rugby. It has a long history as a school but still lacks popularity around Sri Lanka.

In its 39-year history it has produced many graduates including doctors, engineers chemists, teachers and much more. Until the year 2000 it didn't have Advanced/Level classes. First A/L batch faced its exam in the year 2000 in Arts steam. All above mentioned science graduates are the students of Dudley Senanayake College until their Ordinary/Level. Since there were no science A/L they are compelled to go to some other school.

Dudley Senanayake Vidyalaya had a wonderful primary section during latter part of 80s to 2000. It produced many scholars which later became very bright and brilliant students of popular schools of Sri Lankan. This process hid the name of the school and illuminate the names of other schools further.

List of principals

Mrs. Hemawellage (founder principal)

Mr. Athuwedage

Mr. D.S. Jayasinghe

Ven Ulapane Sumangala (current principal )

Houses of the School

Since its origination the names of the houses changed from time to time. Initially it had three houses named Metta, Karuna, Muditha and Upeksha. Then it changed to Gajaba, Vijaya and Parakrama, and then to Hansa, Mayura and Paravi.
