= Basilica College =

Basilica College - Ragama
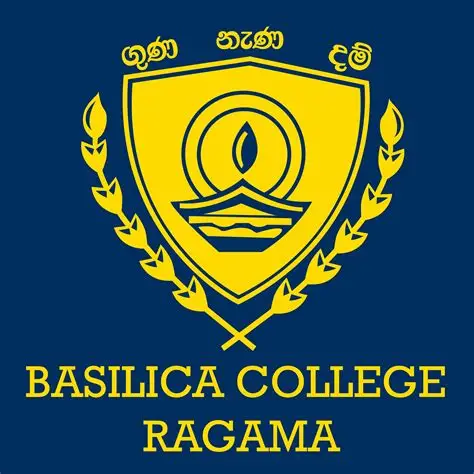

Location
- Ragama; Sri Lanka; 7°03′N 79°54′E

Information
- Type: Government school
- Motto: Guna Nena Dham
- Established: 1993
- Founder: Mr. Austin Silwa
- Principal: Mr.Sumith Maddumaarachhi
- Grades: 6–13
- Gender: Mixed-sex education from grade 6
- Age: 11 to 19
- Colours: Blue and gold

Basilica College (RBC), founded in 1993, is a Catholic school in Ragama, Sri Lanka, managed by the Ragama Zonal Education Office and is affiliated with the Religious of the Virgin Mary order. Basilica College is a mixed school and has classes from grade 6 to grade 13. Classes are conducted in Sinhala as well as English. The college houses is Thomas, Mason, and Heras. Old Basilicans Association started with about 15 members in 2015.

== History ==
The school was established in 1918 under the name Ragama Maha Vidyalaya; it was renamed as Basilica College in 1993.

== Houses ==
The students are divided into Three houses:

=== Mason House ===
- Color : Red

=== Thomas House ===
- Color : Yellow

=== Heras House ===
- Color : Green

== Past principals of Basilica College ==
1. A.A. Silva (Founder)
2. E.N.B.Silva
3. M.K.L.M.L. Alwis
4. Rev. Fr. Bernard Neville Perera
