= Kekunagolla National School =

Muslim school in Sri Lanka

- Narammala; Sri Lanka

Information
- Type: Public School
- Motto: رَبّي زدنِي عِلماً
- Established: 1920
- Principal: Mr. AM Rishad(2021–present)
- Staff: 130
- Grades: 6–13 (Tamil Medium)
- Gender: Boys & girls
- Age: 11 to 19
- Enrollment: 3000
- Colours: Green, Red &Blue

Kekunagolla National School (Tamil: கெகுணகொல்ல தேசியப் பாடசாலை) is a famous Muslim school in Kurunegala District, Northwestern Province Sri Lanka. The birth of the college was a result of the educational reform that was brought along with the 1920 political reforms. It was established in 1925.
