= Sandilipay Hindu College =

- சண்டிலிப்பாய் இந்துக் கல்லூரி

Location
- Sandilipay, Jaffna District, Northern Province; Sri Lanka; 9°44′48.70″N 79°59′12.10″E

Information
- School type: Public provincial 1C
- School district: Valikamam Education Zone
- Authority: Northern Provincial Council
- School number: 1012024
- Teaching staff: 48
- Grades: 1-13
- Gender: Mixed
- Age range: 5-18

Sandilipay Hindu College (Tamil: சண்டிலிப்பாய் இந்துக் கல்லூரி Caṇṭilippāy Intuk Kallūri) is a provincial school in Sandilipay, Sri Lanka.

== See also ==
- List of schools in Northern Province, Sri Lanka
