= Varany =

- Location within Northern Province
- Coordinates: 9°45′N 80°13′E
- Country: Sri Lanka
- Province: Northern Province
- Time zone: UTC+5:30 (India Standard Time)

Varany is a small town located in the region of Northern Province in Sri Lanka. It is around 196 miles (316 km) North of Colombo, the country's capital.

== See also ==
- List of towns in Northern Province, Sri Lanka
