= Chenkalady =

Town in Sri Lanka

- Town
- Location within Sri Lanka
- Coordinates: 7°47′0″N 81°36′0″E
- Country: Sri Lanka
- Province: Eastern
- District: Batticaloa
- DS Division: Eravur Pattu
- Postal code: 30350

Chenkalady or Chenkaladi is a town in the Batticaloa District of Sri Lanka. It is located about 15 km northwest of the city of Batticaloa. In Tamil it translates to "By-the-brick".
