= Urumpirai =

Urumpirai உரும்பிராய் උරුම්පිරෙයි
- Town
- Location within Northern Province
- Coordinates: 9°43′0″N 80°02′0″E
- Country: Sri Lanka
- Province: Northern
- District: Jaffna
- DS Division: Valikamam East
- Population (2007): 11678

Urumpirai (Tamil: உரும்பிராய், romanized: Urumpirāy) is a town in Northern Jaffna District, Sri Lanka. It is located 9 km (5.6 mi) from Jaffna.

- Urumpirai Temple (Tamil: உரும்பிராய் கோயில்கள்)
- Katpahapillaiyar Temple (Tamil: உரும்பிராய் கற்பக விநாயகா்ஆலயம்)

Gat1	Admin District	Zone	Div	School	Address	Medium	Sex	Grades	Type	Roll	Status	Ordinates	Web site
Pro	JAF	JAF	KOP	Urumpirai Hindu College	Palaly Road, Urumpirai	ta	M	1-13	1AB	488	✓	....	UCH
Pro	JAF	JAF	KOP	Urumpirai Saiva Tamil Vidyalayam	Urumpirai North, Urumpirai	ta	M	1-11	II	1,197	✓		
Pro	JAF	JAF	KOP	Urmpirai Santhrothaya Vidyalayam	Urumpirai	ta	M	1-11	II	226	✓		
Pro	JAF	JAF	KOP	Urumpirai R.C.T.M.S.	Urumpirai East, Urumpirai	ta	M	1-5	III	162	✓		

== See also ==
- Sivakumaran
- Anbujan
- Vannan
- C. Nagalingam - acting Governor-General (1954), acting Chief Justice (1954), Attorney General (1946–1947)
