= Valaichchenai Hindu College =

Coordinates: 7.9258°N 81.5317°E

- வாழைச்சேனை இந்து கல்லூரி(தேசிய பாடசாலை)
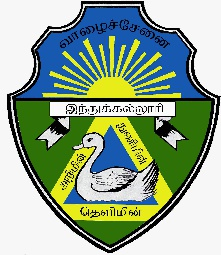

Location
- Valaichenai Hindu College, Kalkudah road, Valaichenai; Batticaloa; Sri Lanka

Information
- Type: Public school
- Motto: அறிமின் தெளிமின் துணிமின்
- Established: 1926; 100 years ago
- Founder: Mr. Costhappa Kandaiya
- Principal: Mr.T. Chandralingam
- Grades: Class 1 - 13
- Gender: Co-educational
- Age range: 6 to 19
- Enrollment: 1800
- Colours: Blue, Gold and Green

Valaichenai Hindu College (Tamil: வாழைச்சேனை இந்து கல்லூரி), Batticaloa, was established in 1926, by Mr. Costhappa Kandaiya. Valaichenai Hindu College is a Navodaya School, which provides primary and secondary education. The school has a student population exceeding 1800 across 13 grades from primary to secondary classes. The school resides in Valaichenai. The academic staff of more than 70 is led by Principal Mr. A Jeyajeevan.
