= Mandandawela =

- Suburb
- Interactive map of Mandandawela
- Country: Sri Lanka
- Province: Central Province
- District: Matale

Government
  - Type: Matale Municipal Council
- Time zone: UTC+5:30 (Sri Lanka Standard Time)

Mandandawela is a suburb of Matale, located within the Central Province, Sri Lanka.

== See also ==
- List of towns in Central Province, Sri Lanka
