= Velanai =

Velanai வேலணை වේලනෛයි
- Village
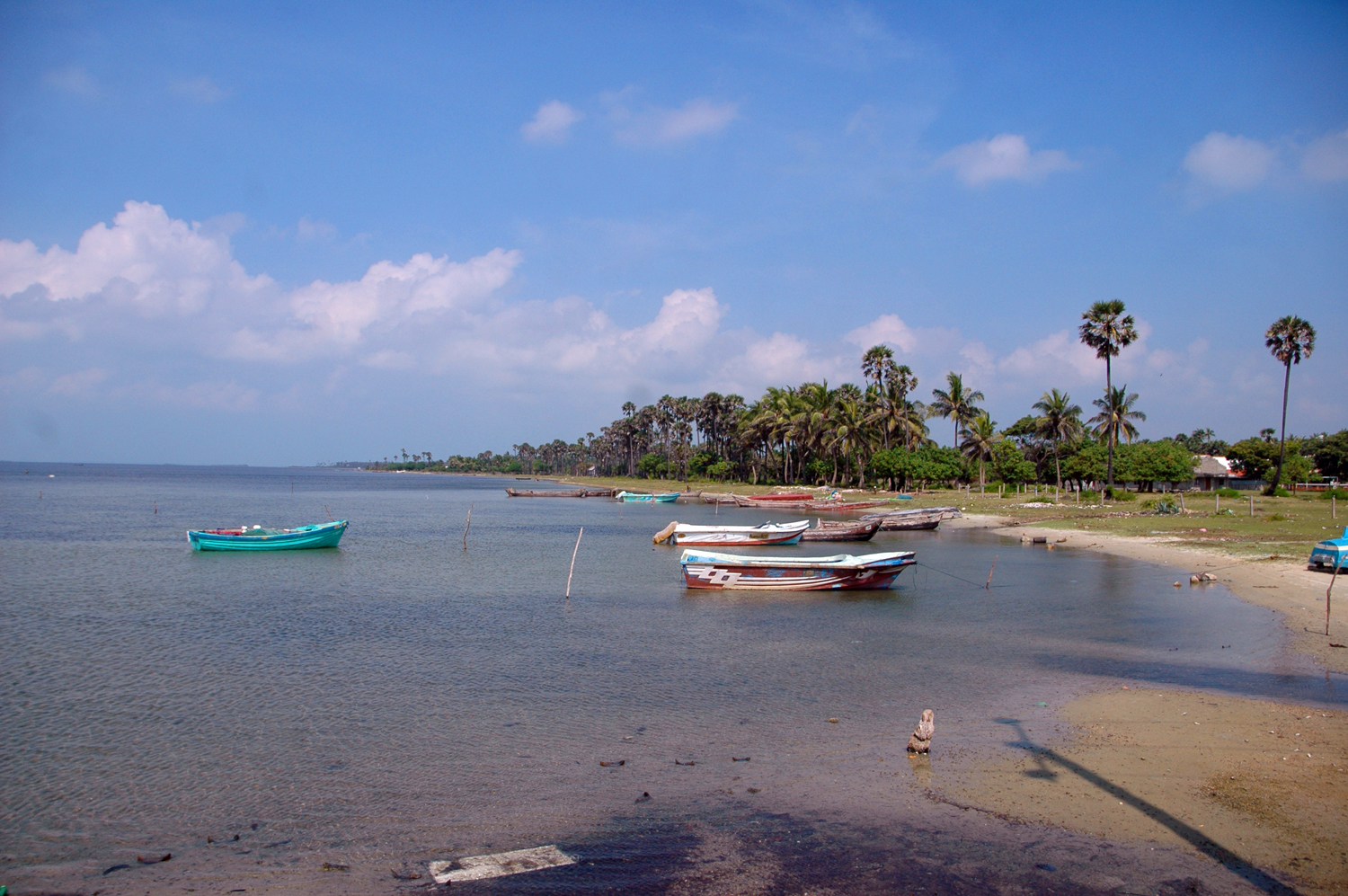

- Location within Northern Province Location within Sri Lanka
- Coordinates: 9°40′0″N 79°52′0″E
- Country: Sri Lanka
- Province: Northern
- District: Jaffna

Velanai (Tamil: வேலணை; Sinhala: වේලනෛයි) is a small village on Velanai Island, off the coast of the Jaffna Peninsula in the north of Sri Lanka.

The majority of the population are— Hindu along with a minority of Christians. There are a number of Hindu temples along with churches and schools. Sir Vaithilingam Duraiswamy, a member of parliament during the British colonial period, and his son Yogendra Duraiswamy, a Sri Lankan diplomat, were born in Velanai.

== Etymology ==
The name Velanai is believed to have been derived from the Tamil words Vel (spear) and Anai (ashore). The name is based in a local legend about the spear of Hindu god Murugan, landing ashore the island. Murugan is worshiped widely in Velanai.

== History ==
Archaeological evidence of ancient life in the area of Chaddy (also called Chatti) beach (Tamil: சாட்டி) has been studied since 2009. Artefacts ranging from prehistoric times to the time of medieval Chinese trade have been found.

In 2024, 3,400 year old human remains were found there, reported to be the first confirmed prehistoric human remains found in the Jaffna Peninsula.

Chaddy beach also housed one of the cemeteries built by the Tamil Tigers for their dead fighters. This cemetery was destroyed by the Sri Lankan Army in the 1990s, but then was rebuilt during the 2002 ceasefire period. The occupying Sri Lankan Navy once again destroyed the cemetery after the end of the civil war leaving no traces behind, in land since used by John Keells. Chaddy beach is also a tourist destination.

== Geography and climate ==
Velanai is surrounded by the Palk Strait and located 6 kilometres (3.7 mi) south-west of Jaffna. Most of Velanai is a level plain with a maximum elevation of 15 metres (49 ft) above mean sea level. The total area of this island is nearly 36 km^{2} (14 sq mi)..

== Gallery ==
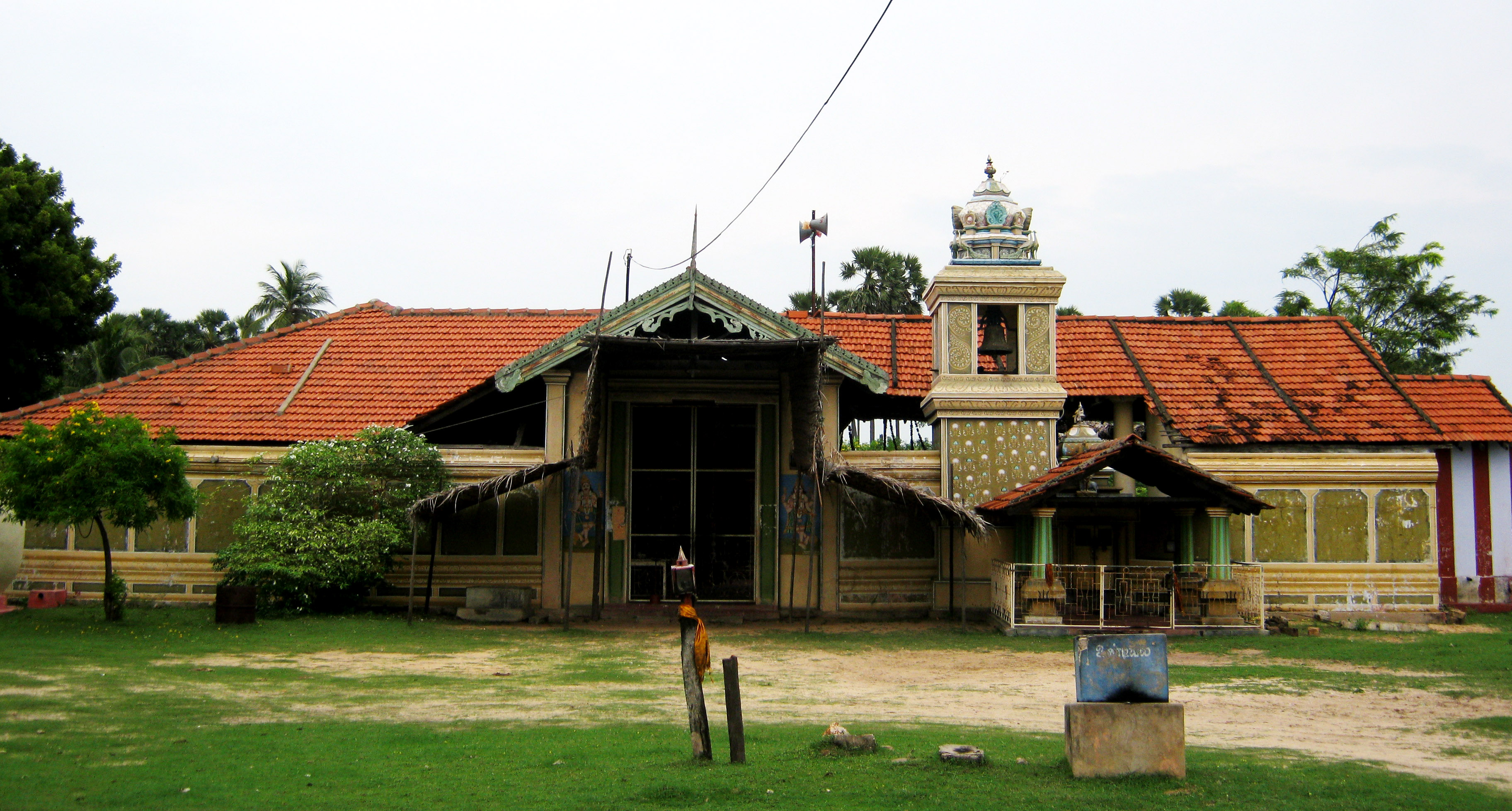
Velanai Vangalavadi Murugan Kovil
