= Maruthamunai =

- Village
- Location in Sri Lanka
- Coordinates: 7°25′00″N 81°49′00″E
- Country: Sri Lanka
- Province: Eastern Province, Sri Lanka
- District: Ampara District
- Divisional Secretariat: Kalmunai

Government
  - Type: Kalmunai Municipal Council

Population
  - Total: 13,948
- Time zone: UTC+5:30 (Sri Lanka Standard Time)
  - Summer (DST): UTC+6 (Summer time)
- Postal Code: 32314

== December 2004 tsunami ==
This picture shows 2004 tsunami hit in Maruthamunai

Maruthamunai was one of the villages most severely affected in Sri Lanka by the Indian Ocean tsunami on 26 December 2004. The disaster killed 922 residents of the village, displaced 11,086, 1,391 houses were completely destroyed and 1,359 were partially damaged. Previous to the disaster the population of the village was officially 17,393. In addition to over 1,300 homes, many public buildings were destroyed by the tsunami.

Maruthamunai is bounded on the North by Periyaneelavanai village, on the West by paddy fields together with the river bed of the Batticaloa Lagoon, on the South by another conventional village - Pandiruppu, and on the East by the Bay of Bengal of the Indian Ocean. Maruthamunai had an extent area of 2.11 square kilometers and a Muslim population of about twenty thousand in 2004, before the Indian Ocean tsunami of 26 December 2004.

== GS divisions and population (2022) ==
GS Number	Area	Total Families	Population
KP/67B	Maruthamunai-1	300	2089
KP/67	Maruthamunai-2	395	3150
KP/67A	Maruthamunai-3	2225	4160
KP/67C	Maruthamunai-4	393	1911
KP/67D	Maruthamunai-5	384	1953
KP/68	Maruthamunai-6 South	610	2553
-	Pandirupu-MD	481	1928
KP/72	Periyaneelavanai-01	619	2959
KP/72A	Periyaneelavanai-02	382	1965

Source: http://www.kalmunai.ds.gov.lk

== Schools ==
- Al Manar Central College(N.S)
- Al Minan Vidyalaya
- Al Madeena Vidyalaya
- Al-Hambra
- Shamsul Ilm Mahavidayalayam
