= Taxila Central College =

Sri Lankan national school

Coordinates: 6°42′41″N 80°03′43″E

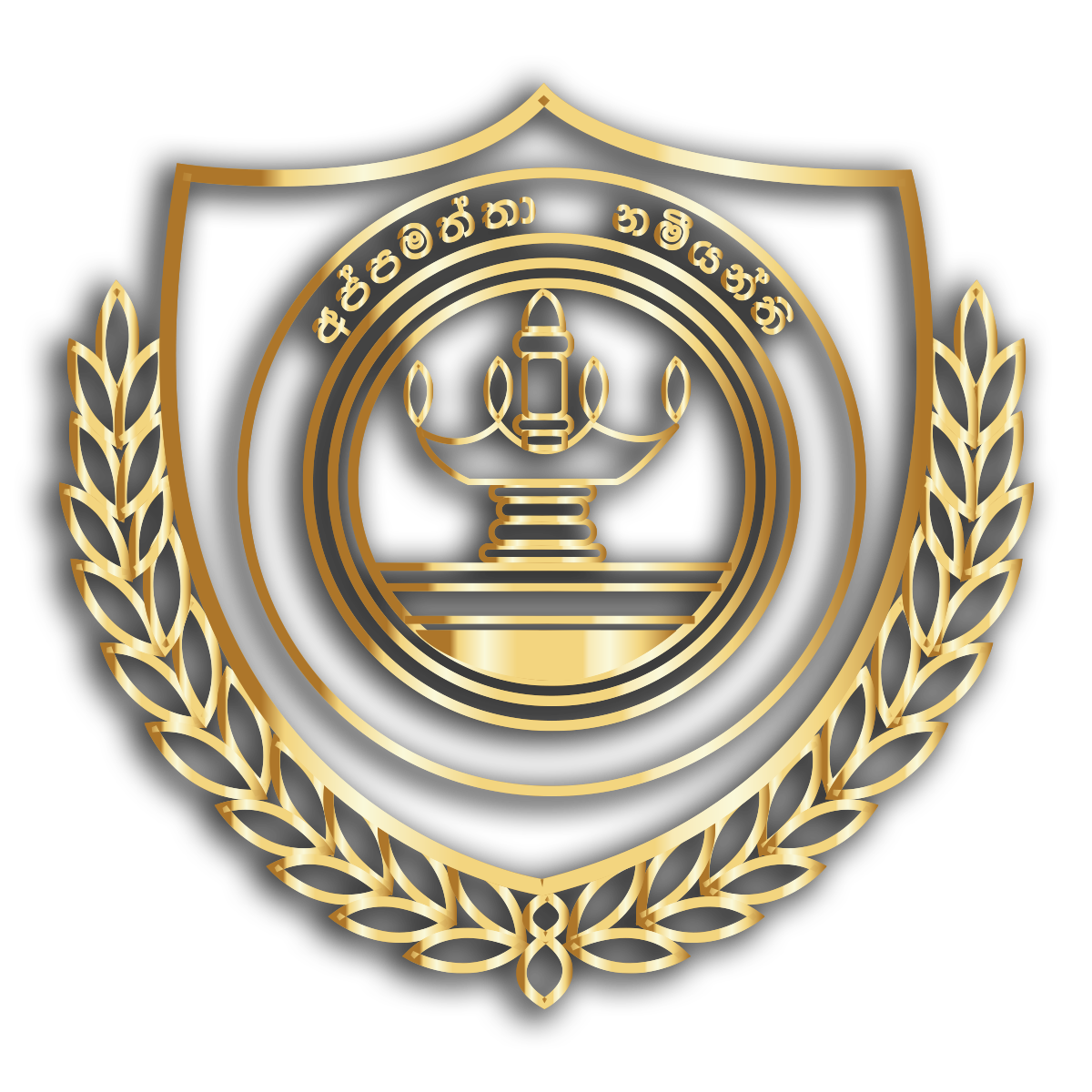
- Sri Lanka

Information
- Type: 1AB
- Motto: "අප්පමත්තා නමියන්ති" (නොපමා වූවන් නොමියති)
- Religious affiliation: Buddhist
- Established: 1946; 80 years ago
- Founder: C. W. W. Kannangara , Henry Steel Olcott
- Principal: W.P.N.D. Weerasinghe
- Grades: 6 - 13
- Gender: Mix
- Age: 10 to 19
- Enrollment: 4000
- Language: Sinhala, English
- Houses: Tissa; Gamunu; Vijaya; Parakrama
- Colours: Maroon, White and Blue
- Song: "සිප් අමරස දහරා පොවා"
- Website: taxilappa.org (Past Pupils)

Taxila Central College in Horana is one of the main mixed schools in Sri Lanka. The number of students are over 4,000. There are classes from grade 6 to 13.

== History ==
Taxila Central College was started as Horana Buddhist English School in 1905 as part of the Henry Steel Olcott's Buddhist School Opening Program. It was founded on a small plot of land donated by a local landowner Sathis Wimalasekara.

In 1930 Horana Buddhist English School was relocated in to a new land donated by Athur V Dies. After that name was renamed as Taxila Buddhist English School.

Later as a result of growing demand of the government schools Taxila Buddhist English School was changed into Taxila Central College on June 6, 1946, under the patronage of Minister of Education C. W. W. Kannangara. After form it in to a central first principal was Thomas Newton Silva.

In 1951 Taxila Central College became above grade 6 school and primary was remained in the former place and remained as a separate institution.

== Admission ==
Admission into Taxila Central college can be done via

- Achieving a high mark in the national Grade 5 Scholarship Examination (then being admitted to grade 6 )
- Admitting to G.C.E(A/L) for grade 12-13 studies ( The admission is determent on the students G.C.E(O/L) examination marks )

Students already attending from Grade 6 are given the opportunity to do Advanced level studies in Taxila Central college by passing the G.C.E O/L exam without any competition

== Competitiveness ==
The school has gained the Reputation of being the most competitive to get into in all of Sri Lanka with the highest cut-off marks required for the Grade 5 scholarship exam.
