= Achchuveli =

Atchuvely அச்சுவேலி
- Town
- Location within Northern Province
- Coordinates: 9°46′0″N 80°06′0″E
- Country: Sri Lanka
- Province: Northern
- District: Jaffna
- DS Division: Valikamam East
- Time zone: UTC+5:30 (Sri Lanka Standard Time)

Atchuvely is a small town in Sri Lanka. It is located within Northern Province.

== See also ==
- List of towns in Northern Province, Sri Lanka
