= Wijayaratnam Hindu Central College =

Wijayaratnam Hindu National College

Location
- Negombo, Western Province; Sri Lanka; 7.2144°N 79.8387°E

Information
- Type: Government School
- Established: 1925
- Grades: 1–13
- Colours: Red, Yellow, Green, Blue, Black
- Website: http://wijayaratnamhcc.lk

Wijayaratnam Hindu National College is a government school in Negombo, Western Province, Sri Lanka. The school was found in 1932 by S.K. Wijayaratnam for the Negombo Tamil people. Wijayaratnam Hindu Central College is the only Hindu Tamil school in the Gampaha District, Sri Lanka.

== Principals ==
- (1954-10-10–1962-12-30) K. Mayilvaganam
- (1962-12-31–1964-03-15) Mr. Kanthasami
- (1964-03-16–1974-01-31) E.S. Sothinathan
- (1974-01031–19798-02-15) Mr. V. Sanmugarajah
- (1979-02-16–1980-05-05) Mr.V. Nadarajah
- (1980-05-06–1980-11-29) Mr.E. Pathmanathan
- (1980-11-30–1981-01-16) Mr.N Balasubramaniyam
- (1981-01-16–1981-02-20) Mr.E.S.V. Perera
- (1981-02-20–1994-12-31) Mrs. A. Kalyanasundaram
- (1995-01-01–1996-06-30) Mr.A.Sanmugarajah
- (1996-07-01–2014-09-10) Mr.N.Ganesalingam
- (2014-09-10– till now) Mr.N.Puwaneshwara Raja
