= Vaddakkachchi =

Coordinates: 9°24′N 80°28′E

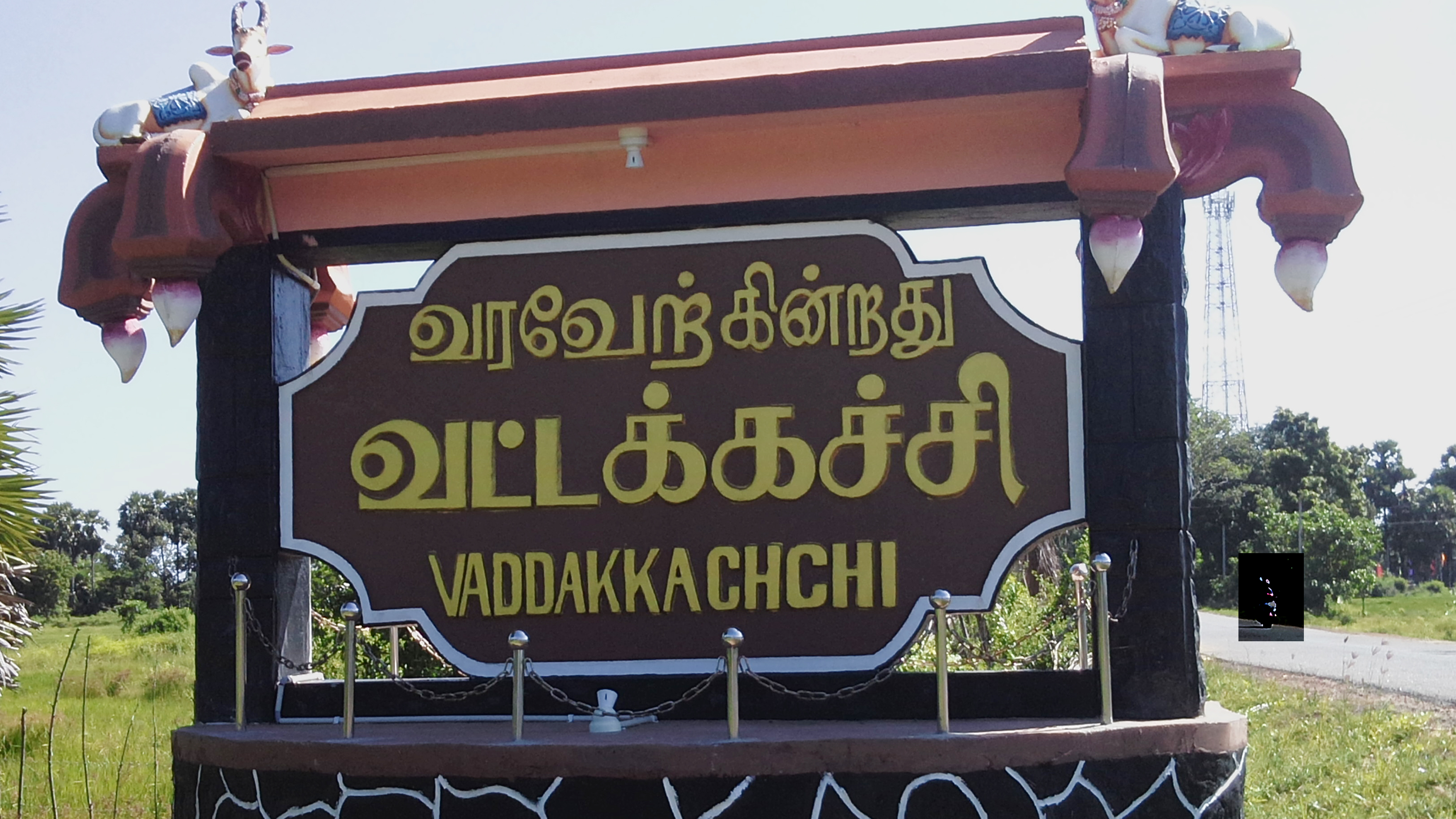
- Interactive map of Vaddakkachchi
- Country: Sri Lanka
- Province: Northern Province
- Time zone: UTC+5:30 (Sri Lanka Standard Time)

Vaddakkachchi is a small town in Northern Province, Sri Lanka.

== See also ==
- List of towns in Northern Province, Sri Lanka
