= Chencholai bombing =

2006 air strike during the Sri Lankan civil war

- Part of the Sri Lankan civil war
- School girls killed in the incident
- Location: Mullaitivu, Mullaitivu District, Sri Lanka
- Date: 14 August 2006 (+6 GMT)
- Attack type: Air bombing
- Weapon: IAI Kfir: Bombs
- Deaths: 61 Tamil school girls
- Injuries: 155+
- Perpetrator: Sri Lankan Airforce

The Chencholai bombing (also spelled Sencholai) took place on 14 August 2006 when the Sri Lankan Air Force bombed a Tamil orphanage in Mullaitivu, northern Sri Lanka, killing 61 girls aged 16 to 18. The Sri Lankan government claimed it was an LTTE rebel training camp. The LTTE, UNICEF, Sri Lanka Monitoring Mission and University Teachers for Human Rights all stated those in the compound were not LTTE cadres.

== Incident ==
The Sri Lankan government claimed to have been monitoring the site since 2004, that it was a training camp and clearly was not a mistaken or wrong target.

The Tamil Nadu state assembly in India passed a resolution termed the Chencholai orphanage bombing as 'uncivilized, barbaric, inhumane and atrocious'.

The human rights organisation University Teachers for Human Rights stated the LTTE had organized a first-aid class and that the children were not child soldiers. It said the camp was used by LTTE but not as a training camp.

A United Nations spokeswoman, Orla Clinton, said the students killed in the attack were between 16 and 18, A-level students, from the Kilinochichi and Mullaittivu areas and were attending a two-day training course.

The Tamil National Alliance condemned the airstrike: "This attack is not merely atrocious and inhuman – it clearly has a genocidal intent. It is yet another instance of brazen state terrorism,”

The Director of Education for Kilinochchi district, T. Kurukularajah, and the Director of Education for Mullaitivu district, P. Ariyaratnam, confirmed the school girls' names.

== Reactions ==
=== UNICEF ===
UNICEF staff from a nearby office immediately visited the compound to assess the situation and to provide fuel and supplies for the hospital as well as counselling support for the injured students and the bereaved families. Ann M. Veneman, UNICEF Executive Director, stated, "These children are innocent victims of violence". UNICEF's Joanne Van Gerpen stated, "At this time, we don't have any evidence that they are LTTE cadres".

=== SLMM ===
A retired major general of the Swedish Army, Ulf Henricsson, was the head of the Nordic truce monitors Sri Lanka Monitoring Mission and said that his staff had not finished counting the dead and that they could not find any sign of military installations or weapons.

=== Sri Lanka government ===
The Sri Lanka government spokesmen Keheliya Rambukwela and Brigadier Athula Jayawardene told the media in Colombo that the orphanage had in fact been a training and transit camp for the LTTE's military cadres. The camp, Jayawardene pointed out, did not look like an orphanage at all or any other civilian structure for that matter. Rambukwela and Jayawardene argued that even if the victims were minors (under 18 years of age) and girls, they were soldiers or soldiers under training. The Sri Lankan refused to condemn the incident or to order any inquiry. The government also showed journalists, as Reuters reported, what appeared to be satellite footage of Tigers fleeing a training camp shortly after Kfir jets had bombed it.

However, a journalist who viewed the tapes stated:

there was nothing in the footage that reporters could see to suggest any military activity except that the location was secluded and had lush green trees in the neighbourhood.

On September 1, Sri Lankan police said they arrested three young women, aged 18, 19 and 20, who they said were injured in the airstrike and were subsequently brought to a hospital in central Sri Lanka for treatment. Inspector General of Police Chandra Fernando said the young women claimed that they were taken by a member of the Tamil Tigers to a camp deep within rebel territory for first aid training – but when they reached the camp, they were forced to undergo weapons training.

A Sri Lankan commission of inquiry was headed by Justice Udalagama to investigate 16 high-profile human rights cases but could finish only 7 cases before it had been disbanded and exonerated the government based on statements of the three arrested girls one of whom came before the commission and other from hospital, the third girl died.

=== North East Secretariat on Human Rights statement ===
In the Senchcholai complex in Vallipunam in the Mullaithivu district hundreds of female students from 17 to 20 were gathered on 10 August 2006 for a weeklong training in leadership and first aid, which was intended for preparing the students for leadership in their school and community during the impending war.

On 14 August 2006, around 7.30 am, Sri Lankan Air Force carried out extensive bombing. 52 students and two staff were killed, and 130 students were seriously injured. Many more received minor injuries. Three of the injured girls lost one leg and another girl lost an eye.

A further three of the injured girls were sent by the Mullaithivu hospital to Kandy for treatment. Sri Lankan Terrorism Investigation Department (TID) then arrested them. They were eventually cleared and brought to Vavuniya hospital to return to their homes in Vanni when one of the injured girls, Thambimuttu Thayalini, died. The other two girls were immediately taken back Kandy hospital. Eventually, the whereabouts of the two girls, Kasthuri Sripathy and Sumithra Balasingham, became mysterious except that their parents were permitted to meet the girls at prearranged locations. The parents of the girls remained at a loss as to the detention of the two girls without charges for almost two years.

== See also ==
- List of attacks on civilians attributed to Sri Lankan government forces
- Operation Carthage
