= Ministry of Education (Sri Lanka) =

Government ministry of Sri Lanka

- අධ්‍යාපන අමාත්‍යාංශය கல்வி அமைச்சு

Agency overview
- Jurisdiction: Government of Sri Lanka
- Headquarters: Sri Jayawardenepura Kotte; 6°53′27.5″N 79°55′48.4″E
- Employees: ~300,000 (2021)
- Annual budget: ▲LKR 213 billion (2025) (▲6.9% of GDP)
- Minister responsible: Hon. Dr. Harini Amarasuriya, Minister of Education
- Agency executive: Mr N.H.M.Chithrananda, Permanent Secretary
- Child agencies: State Ministry of Higher Education; Department of Examinations
- Website: moe.gov.lk

The Ministry of Education (Sinhala: අධ්‍යාපන අමාත්‍යාංශය; Tamil: கல்வி அமைச்சு) is a ministry of the Government of Sri Lanka that directs the formulation and implementation of policies related to primary, secondary, and tertiary education in Sri Lanka. Currently, Sri Lanka allocates less than 2% of its GDP on education, which falls well below the international benchmark of 4-6%, making it one of lowest in the region, UNICEF emphasised until 2025. In the 2025 Budget, Sri Lanka has made a historic investment in education, allocating substantial funds to enhance various aspects of the sector. A significant portion of the budget focuses on early childhood education, with Rs. 80 million designated for the development of selected Early Childhood Development Centers. Additionally, the meal allowance for preschool children has been increased from Rs. 60 to Rs. 100 per meal, supported by an allocation of Rs. 1,000 million to improve their nutritional intake. Recognizing the dedication of preschool teachers, the government has proposed a Rs. 1,000 increase in their existing allowance, amounting to a total allocation of Rs. 100 million.

In a bid to promote higher education opportunities, Rs. 200 million has been allocated to initiate a program that enables talented students to pursue studies at top-ranked international universities. The government also plans to enhance library facilities, with Rs. 100 million designated for the development of libraries in Jaffna and other regions. Additionally, Rs. 500 million has been proposed to develop specialized sports schools in five provinces, aiming to nurture athletic talent and provide better training facilities.

== Departments within the Ministry of Education ==
- Department of Examinations
- Educational Publications Department

== Universities administered ==
- Advanced Technological Institute
- Bhiksu University of Sri Lanka
- Buddhist and Pali University of Sri Lanka

== List of ministers ==
- List of ministers of education

== See also ==
- Education in Sri Lanka
- List of schools in Sri Lanka
