= Big Match =

Annual school cricket match series in Sri Lanka

- Countries: Sri Lanka
- Format: Test, One-Day and Twenty20
- First edition: 1879
- Latest edition: 2026
- Next edition: 2027
- Number of teams: 34 (as of 2024)
- TV: Dialog TV, Peo TV
- Website: ThePapare.com, Batsman.com

In Sri Lankan cricket, a Big Match is an annual school cricket match typically played between two rival schools in Sri Lanka. Said schools often have a long history of competition, with some rivalries lasting over a century. Big matches have become a significant part of modern Sri Lankan culture, involving both school children and alumni.

== History ==
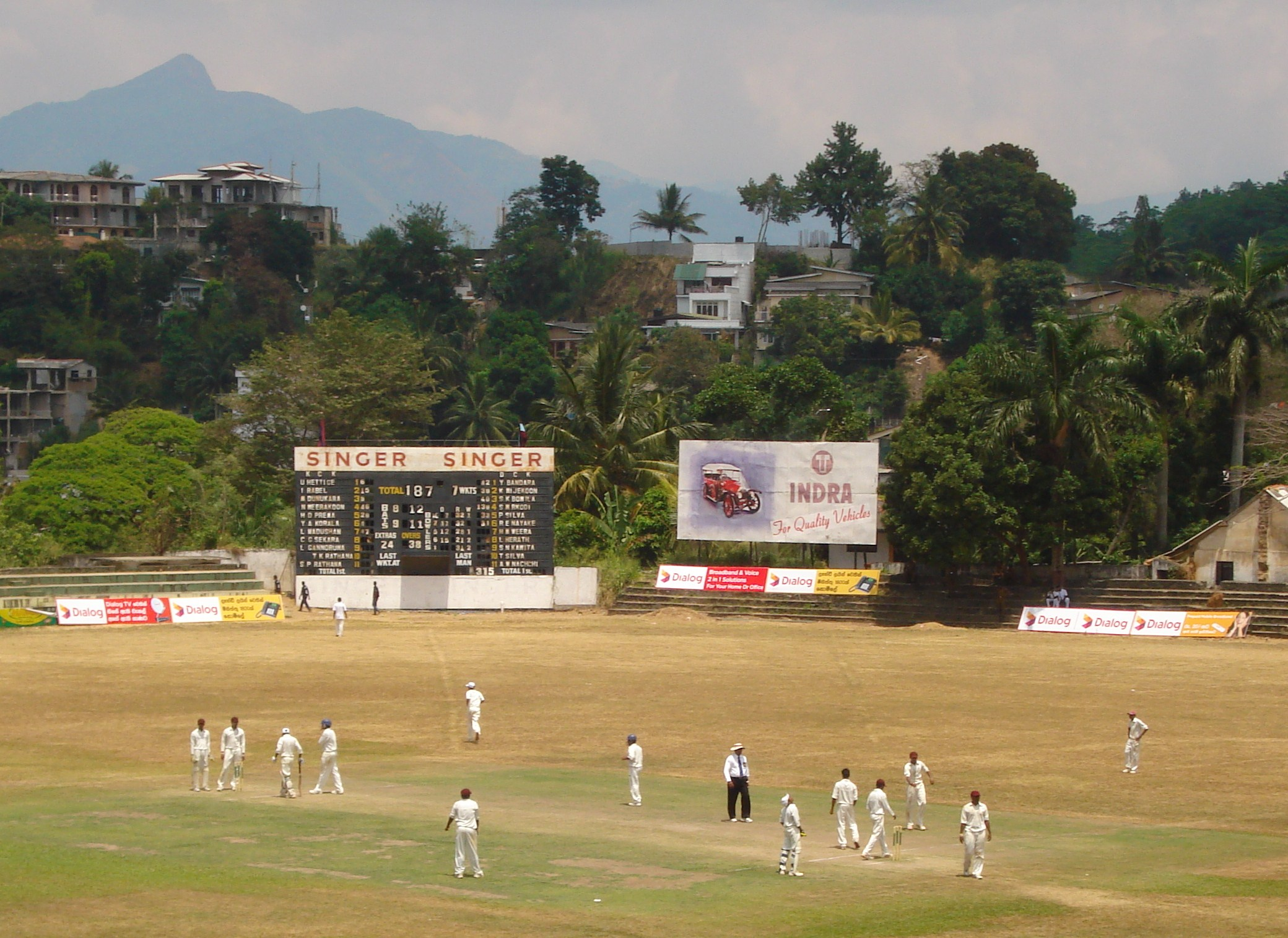
Battle of the Maroons (Kandy) (2010)

Annual Big matches are played between two rival school cricket teams in Sri Lanka. Most of these matches are held at the end of the first school term, typically in March. Big Matches are not only competitions between schools but also serve as gatherings for alumni, known as "Old Boys." Many of these encounters have been played for several years, many over 100 years old.

The oldest known big match is the Battle of the Blues (Colombo) cricket encounter, played between S. Thomas' College, Mount Lavinia and Royal College, Colombo since 1879. The Battle of the Maroons (Kandy) has been played between Dharmaraja College, Kandy, and Kingswood College, Kandy. It is the oldest cricket match series in the central province and the second oldest in Sri Lanka, having been played since 1893. The Battle of the Blues Ruhuna(Matara) has been played between St. Thomas' College, Matara, and St. Servatius' College Matara since 1900.

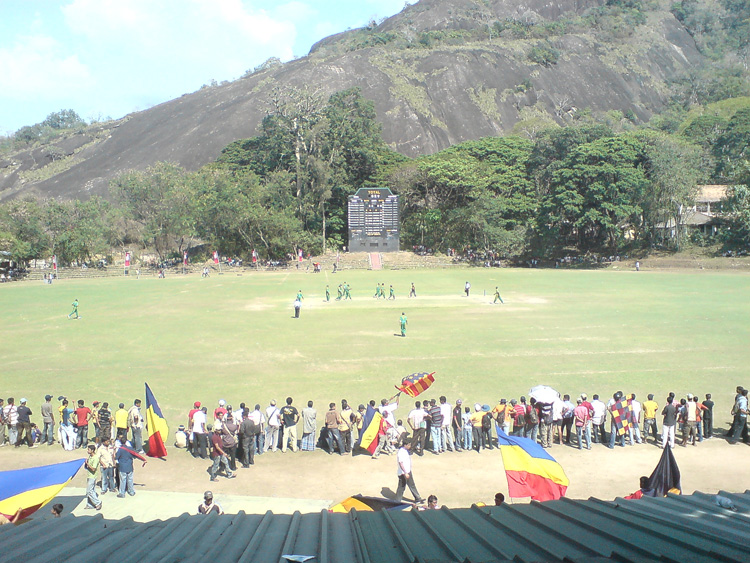
Battle of the Rocks (2009)

Most big matches are played over two days. However, three notable Big Matches–the Battle of the Blues (Colombo), the Battle of the Blues Ruhuna (Matara) and the Battle of the North–are played over three days. Also from 2025 onwards, Sri Lanka Cricket and Sri Lanka Schools Cricket Association have decided that the annual Big Matches between the country's top schools, traditionally held over two days, will now be played as three days encounters. Accordingly, Battle of the Brothers (Colombo) big match between Thurstan College and Isipathana College Colombo is played as a 3-day encounter this year. So as the Battle of the Saints (Colombo) between St Josephs College and St Peters College and the Battle of the Maroons (Colombo) between Ananda College and Nalanda College, Colombo is also played as a 3-day encounter.

== List of Big Matches ==
=== Current ===
The following is a list of Big Matches which are still held annually as of 2025.

#	Series	Rival Schools	First Edition	Latest Edition	Last Played Location	^{Refs.}
1	Battle of the Blues (Colombo)	Royal College, Colombo vs S. Thomas' College, Mount Lavinia	1879	147th (2026)	Singhalese Sports Club Cricket Ground	
2	Battle of the Maroons (Kandy)	Dharmaraja College, Kandy vs Kingswood College, Kandy	1893	119th (2026)	Pallekele International Cricket Stadium	
3	Battle of the Blues Ruhuna (Matara)	St. Thomas' College, Matara vs St. Servatius' College	1900	126th (2026)	Uyanwatte Stadium	
4	Battle of the North	Jaffna Central College vs St. John's College	1901	2026	Jaffna Central College Grounds	
5	The Lovers' Quarrel	Richmond College, Galle vs Mahinda College Galle	1905	121th (2026)	Galle International Stadium	
6	Battle of the Blues (Kandy)	Trinity College, Kandy vs St. Anthony's College, Kandy	1914	107th (2026)	Asgiriya Stadium; St. Anthony's College Cricket Stadium	
7	Battle of the Golds (Jaffna)	Jaffna College vs St. Patrick's College, Jaffna	1917	107th (2026)	Jaffna College Grounds	
8	Battle of Uva (Badulla)	Dharmadutha College, Badulla vs Uva College, Badulla	1920	75th (2026)	Badulla Cricket Ground	
9	Battle of the Maroons (Colombo)	Ananda College Colombo vs Nalanda College, Colombo	1924	95th (2025)	Singhalese Sports Club Cricket Ground	
10	Battle of the Saints (Colombo)	St Peter's College, Colombo vs St. Joseph's College, Colombo	1933 (Note: 30-over matches.)	91st (2025)	Singhalese Sports Club Cricket Ground	
11	Battle of the Golds (Moratuwa)	Prince of Wales' College, Moratuwa vs St. Sebastian's College, Moratuwa	1933	73rd (2025)	De Soysa Stadium	
12	Battle of the Golds (Panadura and Moratuwa)	Sri Sumangala College, Panadura vs Moratu Maha Vidyalaya	1934	74th (2026)	De Soysa Stadium, Panadura Esplanade	
13	Battle of the Mangosteen	Kalutara Vidyalaya vs Tissa Central College	1949	66th (2026)	De Soysa Stadium	
14	Battle of the Babes	St. Sylvester's College Kandy vs Vidyartha College Kandy	1958	64rd (2025)	Pallekele International Cricket Stadium and Asgiriya Stadium	
15	Battle of the Rocks	Maliyadeva College Kurunegala vs St. Anne's College, Kurunegala	1959	41th (2025)	Welagedara Stadium	
16	Battle of the Brothers (Colombo)	Thurstan College Colombo vs Isipathana College Colombo	1964	62th (2025)	Singhalese Sports Club Cricket Ground, R. Premadasa Stadium and Thurstan Grounds	
17	Battle of the Blues (Ambalangoda)	Sri Devananda College Ambalangoda vs Dharmasoka College Ambalangoda	1966	2025	Ambalangoda Urban Council Grounds Ambalangoda	
18	Battle of Kotte	Sri Jayawardenepura Maha Vidyalaya Kotte vs St. Thomas' College, Kotte	1976	2025	Colts Cricket Club Ground	
19	Battle of the Golds (Matale)	St. Thomas' College, Matale vs Government Science College	1980	2025	Police Ground in Kandy	
20	Battle of the Hindus	Hindu College Colombo vs Jaffna Hindu College	1981	2025	P. Sara Oval Ground and Jaffna Hindu College Ground	
21	Battle of the Golds (Kandy)	Sri Sumangala College Kandy vs Sri Rahula College Kandy	1981	26th (2025)	Pallekale International Cricket Stadium	
22	Battle of the Kalaniya	Gurukula College Kalaniya vs Sri Dharmaloka College Kalaniya	1988	35th (2025)	P. Sara Oval Ground	
23	Battle of Sri Jayawardanapura	St. John's College, Nugegoda vs Ananda Sastralaya, Kotte	1990	2025	P. Sara Oval Ground	
24	Battle of the Greens (Panadura)	Royal College Panadura vs St. John's College Panadura	1992	26th (2025)	Panadura Sports Club and De Soysa Stadium	
25	Battle of the Raigam Salpiti	Piliyandala Central College vs Taxila Central College, Horana	2001	23th (2025)	De Soysa Stadium	
26	Battle of The Tuskers	Maliyadeva Adarsha Maha Vidyalaya vs Ibbagamuwa Central College, Ibbagamuwa	2002	14th Edition (2026)	Welagedara Stadium	
27	Battle of Blue and Gold	Nugawela Central College vs A. Rathnayake Central College	2004	22th (2026)	Pallekele International Cricket Stadium	
28	Battle of Greens (Wayamba)	Royal College Wayamba, Kurunegala vs Sir John Kotalawala College	2005	2024	Welagedara Stadium	
29	Battle of the Golds (Colombo)	D. S. Senanayake College vs Mahanama College	2007	19th (2025)	P. Sara Oval and R. Premadasa Stadium	
30	Battle of the Rathran	Prasident's College Kotte vs Asoka College Colombo	2008	17th (2025)	P. Sara Oval and R. Premadasa Stadium	
31	Battle of Golden Lions	Rahula College vs Dharmapala Vidyalaya	2012	12th (2025)	Uyanwatte Stadium	
32	Battle of the Seagulls	St. Peter's College Negombo vs St.Sebastian's College Katuneriya	2012	2025	BOI Sports Complex Katunayake	
33	Battle of the Raigam Pasdun	C.W. W. Kannangara Central College, Matugama vs Sri Palee College,Horana	2018	8th (2026)	Bandaragama Ground	
34	Battle of Glory of Galle Encounter	Vidyaloka College vs St. Aloysius' College, Galle	2018	2025(5th)	Galle International Stadium	
35	Battle of the Blues and Maroons	Mahinda Rajapaksha College, Homagama vs Defence Services School, Colombo	2018	4th (2025)	Singhalese Sports Club Cricket Ground	
36	Battle of Ran Dam	Royal College Horana vs Siri Piyarathne Vidyalaya, Padukka	2021	3rd (2025)	Poojitha Uduwana Ground, Horana	
37	The Pride of Galle	Vidyaloka College vs All Saints College, Galle	2026	2026 (1st)	Galle International Stadium	
38	Battle of Gold, Kegalle	St. Mary's College, Kegalle vs Kegalu Vidyalaya	1960	66th (2026)	Public Ground, Kegalle	

=== Former ===
The following is a list of former Big Matches which are no longer held regularly as of 2026.

Series	Rival Schools	First Edition	Last Edition	^{Refs.}
Battle of the Centralions	Piliyandala Central College vs Wadduwa Central College	1975	2000	
Battle of Dematagoda	St. John's College vs St. Mathew's College	1976 (Note: Intermittent.)	2010s	
Battle of Friends	Vidyaloka College, Galle vs Meepawala Amarasuriya College, Galle	1998	2012	
Battle of Two Cities (The F. R Alles Trophy)	Rahula College vs St. Aloysius' College	2004	2011	
Battle of the Hindus	Jaffna Hindu College vs Kokuvil Hindu College	2008	2010s	
Battle of the Golds (Ruhuna)	Weeraketiya Rajapaksha Central College vs Dickwella Vijitha Central College	2010	2010s	
Battle of the Greens	Arethusa College vs T. B. Jayah Zahira College	2012	2010s	
Nikitha Grero Challenge Trophy	Lyceum International School Panadura vs Lyceum International School Nugegoda	2015	2019	
Battle of Minipura ( Ratnapura )	St.Aloysius' College Ratnapura vs Sivali Central College Ratnapura	1931	2000	
