= List of St. Sylvester's College alumni =

This is a list of Old Sylvestrines, the alumni of St. Sylvester's College, Kandy, Sri Lanka.

Name	Notability	Reference
Ishak Sahabdeen	International cricket and hockey player	
S. B. S. Abayakoon	Vice-Chancellor of University of Peradeniya (2009–2012)	
Tilake Abeysinghe	Internationally reputed painter and sculptor - awarded “Cavaliere of the Order of Merit" (knighthood) by the Italian Government.	
Buwaneka Aluwihare	Puisne Justice of the Supreme Court of Sri Lanka (2013–present), Deputy Solicitor General (?-2013)	
Malcolm Bulner	1964 Olympic welterweight boxer, boxing referee (1944 –)	
Mahinda Aluvihare	Ceylon national football team player (1961 – 1968)	
Jayanath Colombage	Admiral - Commander of the Navy (2012 – 2014)	
Eric Fernando	Director-General of the Sri Lanka Broadcasting Corporation (1998 – )	
Lionel Fernando	Governor of North Eastern Province (1993 – 1994)	
Hemal Gunasekara	Member of Parliament - Matara (2010–present)	
Tikiri Kobbekaduwa	Governor of Central Province (2005 – 2015)	
M. Velu Kumar	Member of Parliament - Kandy (2015–present)	
George Pelpola	Member of Parliament - National List (1977-1989), Ambassador to Maldives, Ambassador to Italy	
Gamini Rajapakse	Member of Parliament - (1977-1989), Ambassador to Jordan (2011-2015)	
Chandradasa Ranatunga	Member of Parliament - Kegalle (1989-1994)	
Kingsley Rajapakse	Filmmaker and actor (1934-1983)	
Cyril Ranatunga	General - Chief of Staff Sri Lankan Army; first General Officer Commanding the Joint Operations Command; Secretary of Defence	
Percy Samaraweera	Chief Minister of Uva Province (1988-1998), Member of Parliament - Welimada (1965-1970, 1977-1989)	
Chandana P. Udawatte	Vice-Chancellor of Sabaragamuwa University (2014-2017)	
Jayampathy Wickramaratne	Member of Parliament - National List (2015–present)	
Susantha Mendis	Major general, Brigade Commander, 51-4 Brigade	
Jayampathy Wickramaratne	Member of Parliament - National List (2015–present)	
Sriyanath Karalliyadde	Judge of the Court of Appeal of Sri Lanka (2020–2025)	
Vasu Bandu Edirisinghe	20th Commander of the Air Force (2025–present)	

== See also ==
- St. Sylvester's College
