= Battle of the Golds =

Battle of the Golds or Battle of Golds may refer to:

- Battle of the Golds (Jaffna) - Annual cricket match between Jaffna College and St. Patrick's College, Jaffna.
- Battle of the Golds (Moratuwa) - Annual cricket match between Prince of Wales' College, Moratuwa and St. Sebastian's College, Moratuwa.
- Battle of the Golds (Panadura and Moratuwa) - Annual cricket match between Sri Sumangala College, Panadura and Moratuwa Maha Vidyalaya, Moratuwa.
- Battle of the Golds (Colombo) - Annual cricket match between D.S Senanayake College, Colombo and Mahanama College, Colombo.
- Battle of the Golds (Kandy) - Annual cricket match between Sri Rahula College, Kandy and Sri Sumangala College, Kandy.
- Battle of the Golds (Matale) - Annual cricket match between St. Thomas' College, Matale and Government Science College, Matale.
- Battle of the Golds (Kegalle) - Annual cricket match between Kegalu Vidyalaya and St. Mary's College, Kegalle.
