= Battle of the Maroons =

Battle of the Maroons may refer to:

- Battle of the Maroons (Colombo) - Annual cricket match between Ananda College and Nalanda College, Colombo.
- Battle of the Maroons (Kandy) - Annual cricket match between Dharmaraja College and Kingswood College, Kandy.
