= Battle of the Babes =

Annual School Cricket Match Series

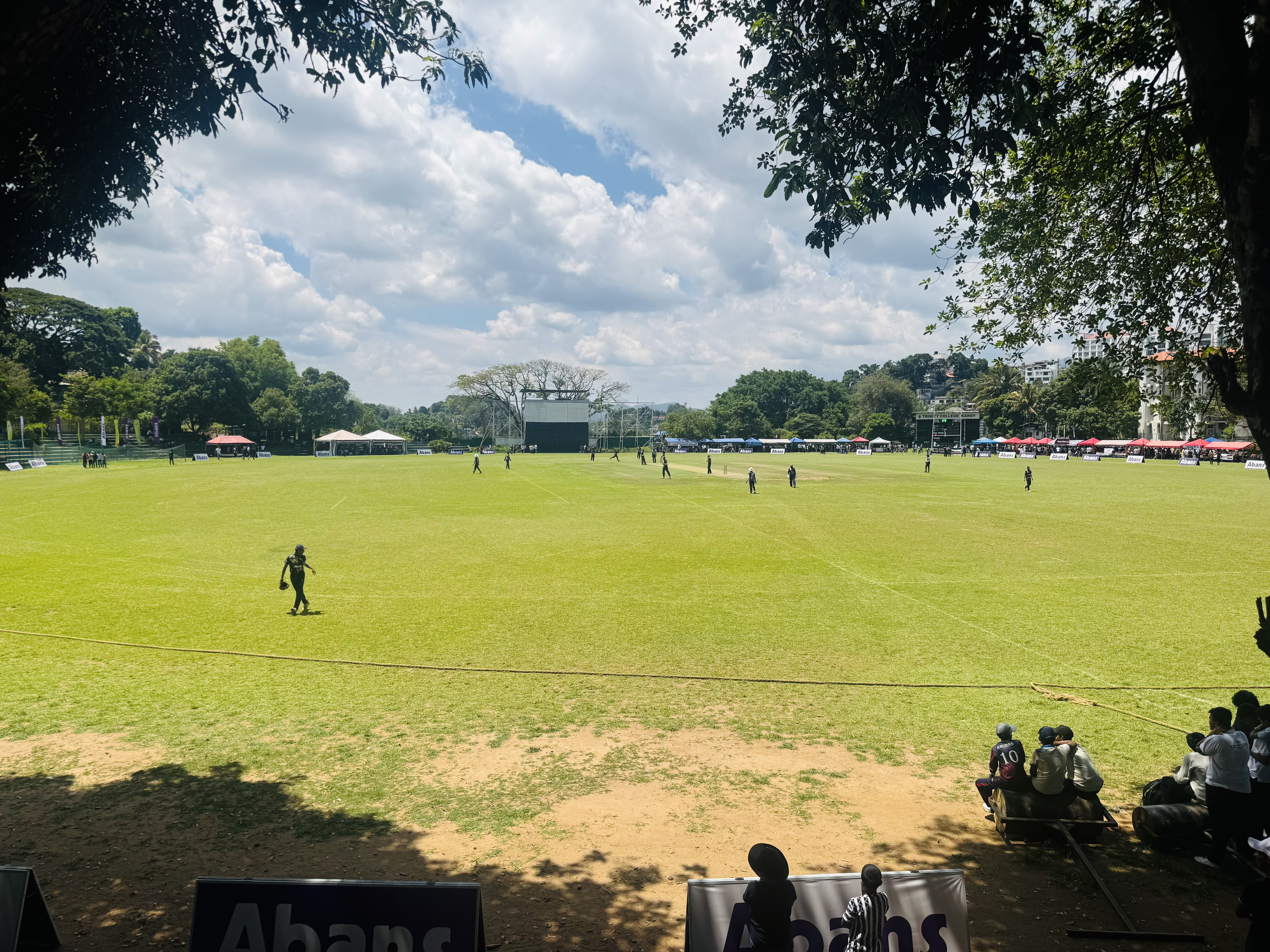
- 2026 One Day game played at Asgiriya Stadium
- Sport: Cricket
- Type: Test Match; One-Day
- Location: Kandy
- Teams: St. Sylvester's College; Vidyartha College
- First meeting: 1958
- Latest meeting: 2026
- Next meeting: 2027
- Broadcasters: Dialog TV; Peo TV
- Stadiums: Pallekele International Cricket Stadium; Asgiriya Stadium

Statistics
- Total meetings: Test Match – 66; One-Day – 37
- Most wins: St. Sylvester's College (17 wins - Test)

Battle of the Babes (Also known as Vidyartha College - St. Sylvester's College Cricket Encounter) is an annual Big Match played between Vidyartha College and St. Sylvester's College since 1958 Annually; except for 3 years due to unavoidable circumstances. Otherwise, it has been now played for 65 years.

== History ==
This traditional Big Match has been played Annually since 1958; except for 3 years due to unavoidable circumstances. As of 2025, 65 Big Matches and 36 One-Day Matches have been played between Vidyartha College and St. Sylvester's College. Out of the 65 Big Matches, St. Sylvester's College has won 16 matches and Vidyartha College has won 3 matches while, 46 matches were drawn. The One Day Encounter is known as the "M.B.W.Mediwaka Memorial Encounter".

== Overall result ==
As of 5th April 2026

Teams	Battle of the Babes			Current Trophy Holder	
Teams	Total Win	Total Lost	Total Draw	Test	One Day
St. Sylvester's College	17	3	46	St. Sylvester's College	St. Sylvester's College
Vidyartha College	3	17	46	St. Sylvester's College	St. Sylvester's College

=== Results table ===
Year	Date	VCK		SSCK		Result	Ref.
Year	Date	1st Ings	2nd Ings	1st Ings	2nd Ings	Result	Ref.
1958 - 1964 No Data							
1965 - 1967 Not Played							
1968 -2015 No Data							
2016	11–12 March	161	N/A	203	189/3	Drawn	
2017	3–4 March	104/8	N/A	136	N/A	Drawn	
2018	TBC						
2019	8–9 March	146	N/A	228	149/5	Drawn	
2020 – 2022 No Data							
2023	31 March – 1 April	199	N/A	94	149/3	Drawn	
2024	29–30 March	124/10	168/10	283/9d	12/0	SSCK Won	
2025	9–10 May	196/9	N/A	221/9d	77/2	Drawn	

=== One-Day encounters ===
- Matches Played - 36

==== Results table ====
Year	Date	VCK	SSCK	Result	Ref.
No Data					
2016	20 March	143/8	144/3	SSCK Won	
2017	12 March	Match Cancelled			
2018	TBC				
2019	24 March	167	169/5	SSCK Won	
2020 - 2022 No Data					
2023	9 April	135	243/8	SSCK Won	
2024	7 April	124/10	125/7	SSCK Won	
2025	17 May	31/1 (Cancelled Due to Bad Weather)	N/A	N/A	

== Venues ==
Kandy
Pallekele International Cricket Stadium	Asgiriya Stadium

== Notes ==
- Students of Vidyartha College are known as Tigers
- Students of St. Sylvester's College are known as Sylvestrians or Vesters

== See also ==
- Big Match
- Battle of the Maroons
- Battle of the Blues
- 2024 Big Matches
