= Sri Lanka at the 1998 Commonwealth Games =

- CGF code: SRI
- CGA: National Olympic Committee of Sri Lanka
- Website: srilankaolympic.org

in Kuala Lumpur, Malaysia
- Medals Ranked 27th: Gold 0 Silver 1 Bronze 1 Total 2

Commonwealth Games appearances (overview)
- 1938; 1950; 1954; 1958; 1962; 1966; 1970; 1974; 1978; 1982; 1986; 1990; 1994; 1998; 2002; 2006; 2010; 2014; 2018; 2022; 2026; 2030

The 1998 Commonwealth Games were Sri Lanka's 11th appearance in the Commonwealth Games. Sri Lanka won two medals and were ranked 27th on the medal table.

== Medals ==
	(gold)	(silver)	(bronze)	Total
Sri Lanka	0	1	1	2

=== Silver ===
- Sriyani Kulawansa - Women's 100 m Hurdles, 12.95 s

=== Bronze ===
- Sugath Thilakaratne - Men's 400 m, 44.64 s

== Cricket ==
Sri Lanka named the below squad for the tournament.

Roster

- Hashan Tillakaratne (c)
- Mahela Jayawardene (vc)
- Russel Arnold
- Upul Chandana
- Indika de Saram
- Lanka de Silva (wk)
- Indika Gallage
- Avishka Gunawardene
- Chandika Hathurusingha
- Pradeep Hewage
- Suresh Perera
- Thilan Samaraweera
- Mario Villavarayan
- Malinda Warnapura

Summary

Team	Event	Group stage				Semifinal	Final / BM	
Team	Event	Opposition Result	Opposition Result	Opposition Result	Rank	Opposition Result	Opposition Result	Rank
Sri Lanka men	Men's tournament	Malaysia; W by 7 wickets	Jamaica; W by 67 runs	Zimbabwe; W by 1 wicket	1 Q	South Africa; L by 1 wicket	New Zealand; L by 51 runs	4

Group stage

Group A
Pos	Team	Pld	W	L	T	NR	Pts	NRR
1	Sri Lanka	3	3	0	0	0	6	1.581
2	Zimbabwe	3	2	1	0	0	4	1.887
3	Jamaica	3	1	2	0	0	2	−0.122
4	Malaysia	3	0	3	0	0	0	−3.736

Source: ESPNcricinfo

9 September 1998
10:00
Scorecard

Malaysia; 109 (47.4 overs)	v	Sri Lanka; 112/3 (19.4 overs)
Rakesh Madhavan 37; Thilan Samaraweera 3/17 (8.4 overs)		Avishka Gunawardene 43; Ramesh Menon 2/30 (5.4 overs)

Sri Lanka won by 7 wickets
Kelab Aman, Kuala Lumpur
Umpires: Beattie Arlow (NI) and V. K. Ramaswamy (Ind)

- Sri Lanka won the toss and elected to field.
- Suresh Navaratnam (Mas) made his List A debut.
- Marimuthu Muniandy (Mas) played his final List A match.
- Points: Sri Lanka 2, Malaysia 0.

12 September 1998
10:00
Scorecard

Sri Lanka; 211/5 (50 overs)	v	Jamaica; 144/8 (50 overs)
Avishka Gunawardene 107; Kirk Powell 1/28 (8 overs)		Jimmy Adams 34*; Russel Arnold 2/17 (10 overs)

Sri Lanka won by 67 runs
Perbadanan Kemajuan Negeri Selangor Sports Complex, Petaling Jaya
Umpires: Dave Orchard (SA) and V. K. Ramaswamy (Ind)

- Jamaica won the toss and elected to field.
- Avishka Gunawardene (SL) scored his maiden List A century.
- Points: Sri Lanka 2, Jamaica 0.
- Jamaica were eliminated as a result of this match.

14 September 1998
10:00
Scorecard

Zimbabwe; 265/7 (50 overs)	v	Sri Lanka; 266/9 (47.2 overs)
Alistair Campbell 82; Chandika Hathurusingha 1/34 (10 overs)		Indika de Saram 75*; Pommie Mbangwa 3/49 (8.2 overs)

Sri Lanka won by 1 wicket
Tenaga National Sports Complex, Kuala Lumpur
Umpires: Rudi Koertzen (SA) and Steve Bucknor (WI)

- Sri Lanka won the toss and elected to field.
- Points: Sri Lanka 2, Zimbabwe 0.
- Sri Lanka qualified for the semi-finals and Zimbabwe were eliminated as a result of this match.

Semi-final

16 September 1998
10:00
Scorecard

Sri Lanka; 130 (44 overs)	v	South Africa; 131/9 (47 overs)
Avishka Gunawardene 53 (87); Nicky Boje 4/16 (9 overs)		Michael Rindel 25 (28); Thilan Samaraweera 2/13 (10 overs)

South Africa won by 1 wicket
Perbadanan Kemajuan Negeri Selangor Sports Complex, Petaling Jaya
Umpires: Darrell Hair (Aus) and Russell Tiffin (Zim)

- South Africa won the toss and elected to field.

Bronze medal match

18 September 1998
10:00
Scorecard

New Zealand; 212/7 (50 overs)	v	Sri Lanka; 161 (44.4 overs)
Chris Harris 56* (71); Russel Arnold 1/27 (10 overs)		Suresh Perera 45 (55); Daniel Vettori 3/33 (10 overs)

New Zealand won by 51 runs
Tenaga National Sports Complex, Kuala Lumpur
Umpires: Rudi Koertzen (SA) and Saleem Badar (Pak)

- Sri Lanka won the toss and elected to field.

== Netball ==
Squad

- Harshanie Arachchige
- Rathna Arachchige
- Somitha Arachchige
- Dilani Arachchilage
- Deepi Nalika Prasadi Pitiyage Don
- Manoji Galhenage
- Nazleen Hassim
- Arunika Karawitage
- Jayanthi Somasekaram De Silva
- Deepthi Rupasinghe

Summary

Sri Lanka finished 12th in the netball at the 1998 Commonwealth Games. In the group stages, they lost all five of their five matches.

Group B

14 September 1998	South Africa	91–22	Sri Lanka

15 September 1998	Malawi	77–24	Sri Lanka

16 September 1998	Cook Islands	82–50	Sri Lanka

17 September 1998	New Zealand	92–16	Sri Lanka

18 September 1998	Wales	63–45	Sri Lanka

Pos	Team	P	W	D	L	GF	GA	GD	Pts
1	New Zealand	5	5	0	0	416	141	+275	10
2	South Africa	5	4	0	1	315	207	+108	8
3	Cook Islands	5	2	1	2	283	330	-47	5
4	Malawi	5	2	0	3	283	270	-13	4
5	Wales	5	1	1	3	220	321	-101	3
6	Sri Lanka	5	0	0	5	157	405	-248	0

Qualified for Semi-final 1
Qualified for Semi-final 2
