= Karalliyadde =

Karalliyadde (Sinhala: කරල්ලියද්දේ, romanized: Karalliyaddē) is both a given name and a surname. Notable people with the name include:

- Karalliyadde Bandara, King of Kandy
- Sriyanath Karalliyadde (died 2025), Sri Lankan judge of the Court of Appeal
- Tissa Karalliyadde (born 1952), Sri Lankan politician
