= Malcolm Bulner =

Sri Lankan boxer

Personal information
- Nationality: Sri Lankan (till 1964); Australian
- Born: 9 July 1944 (age 82) Kandy, British Ceylon (now Sri Lanka)
- Height: 178 cm (5 ft 10 in)
- Weight: 66 kg (146 lb)

Boxing career
- Stance: southpaw

Malcolm Bulner (born 9 July 1944) is a Sri Lankan-Australian former welterweight boxer.

Bulner was educated at St. Sylvester's College, which is located in his home town, Kandy.

He represented Ceylon at the 1962 British Empire and Commonwealth Games and at the 1964 Summer Olympics in Tokyo.

Bulner later went onto represent Australia in international boxing competitions just after participating in the 1964 Summer Olympics representing Ceylon. He was coached by Derrick Raymond, who was a notable boxing coach in his times.

Presently, Bulner serves as one of the world class boxing judges (referee) and has officiated in several boxing competitions held in Australia.

== 1964 Olympic results ==
Below is the record of Malcolm Bulner, a welterweight boxer from Ceylon who competed at the 1964 Tokyo Olympics:

- Round of 32: lost to Bohumil Nemecek (Czechoslovakia) by decision, 0-5

== See also ==
- List of St. Sylvester's College alumni
