= Vasu Bandu Edirisinghe =

Sri Lankan air force officer

Air Marshal Vasu Bandu Edirisinghe WWV RWP RSP USP
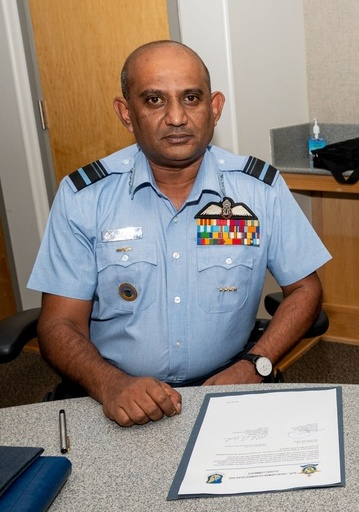
- Vasu Bandu Edirisinghe in June 2023

20th Commander of the Air Force
- Incumbent
- Assumed office 29 January 2025
- President: Anura Kumara Dissanayake
- Preceded by: R. A. U. P. Rajapaksa

Personal details
- Born: 20 June 1970 (age 56)
- Education: Sri Lanka Air Force Academy; St. Sylvester's College

Military service
- Allegiance: Sri Lanka
- Branch/service: Sri Lanka Air Force
- Years of service: 1993–present
- Rank: Air Marshal
- Commands: No. 7 Helicopter Squdron; SLAF Anuradhapura; SLAF Hingurakgoda
- Battles/wars: Sri Lankan Civil War; Operation Yukthiya
- Awards: Weera Wickrama Vibhushanaya; Rana Wickrama Padakkama; Rana Sura Padakkama (3); Uttama Seva Padakkama

Air Marshal Vasu Bandu Edirisinghe, WWV, RWP, RSP & 2 bars, USP fndu(China), psc, qhi (born 20 June 1970) is a senior Sri Lanka Air Force (SLAF) officer, currently serving as the 20th Commander of the Sri Lanka Air Force, since 29 January 2025.

An alumnus of St. Sylvester's College, he served as the Director General Planning before being appointed Commander of the Sri Lanka Air Force.

== Air force career ==
Edirisinghe joined the Sri Lanka Air Force as an officer cadet in 1991, he was commissioned two years later in 1993 as a Pilot Officer in the General Duties (Pilot) branch. He underwent flying training on the SF-260, initially posted to the Transport Wing where he completed fixed-wing advanced training. Very soon he was trained as helicopter pilot and was posted to the Bell 212 Utility Helicopter Squadron. In 1998, he became the Helicopter Instructor Pilot. He commanded three helicopter squadrons and two airbases. Later he commanded the Air Force Academy, China Bay. Before becoming the air force commander he held directorial position in air force headquarters.

In 2011, he served as the Air Attache in the Sri Lankan High Commission in Pakistan.

== Personal life ==
Edirisnghe's wife name is Krishanthi.
