= Battle of the Golds (Panadura and Moratuwa) =

Annual School Cricket Match Series

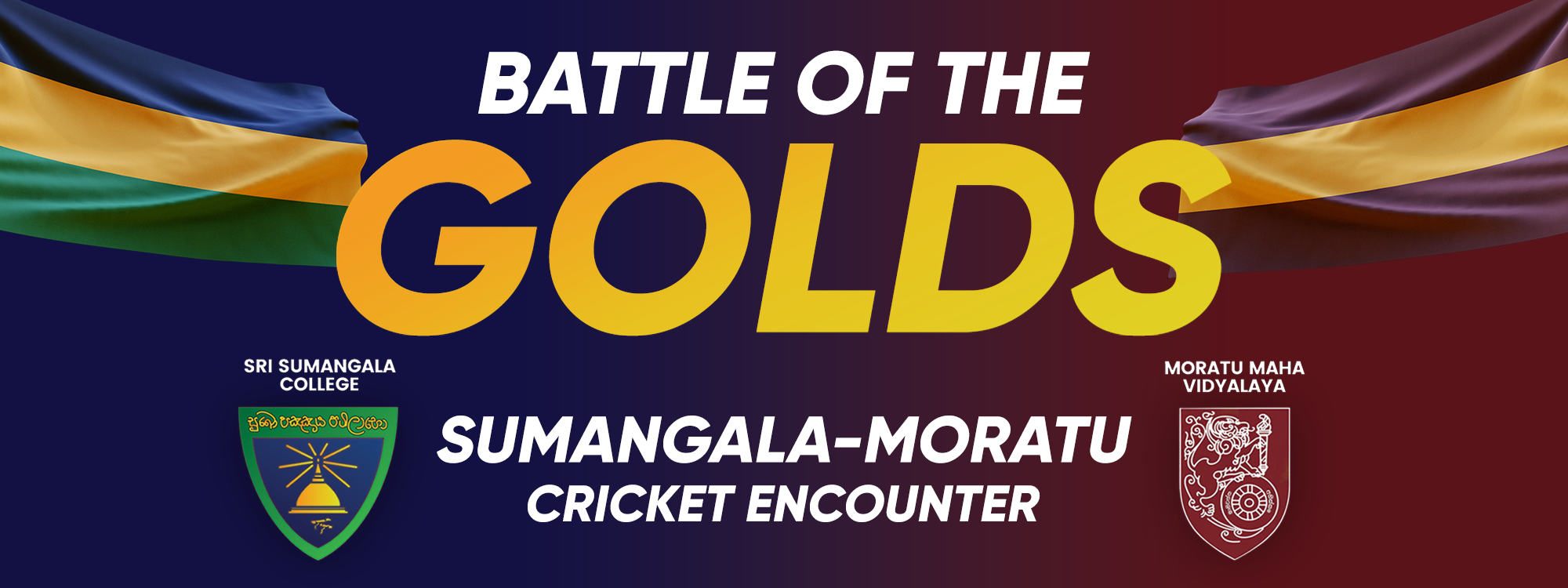
- Countries: Sri Lanka
- Format: Test and One-Day
- First edition: 1934
- Latest edition: 2026
- Next edition: 2027
- Number of teams: Sri Sumangala College; Moratu Maha Vidyalaya
- Current trophy holder: Moratu Maha Vidyalaya (Big Match - 2010); Sri Sumangala College (One-Day Encounter - 2025)
- Most successful: Sri Sumangala College (8 wins - Big Match); Sri Sumangala College (17 wins - One-Day)
- Most runs: 153 by Roshan Wimalasena in 1996 - Sri Sumangala College (Test)
- Most wickets: 8 wickets by Iresh Pushpakumara in 2007 - Sri Sumangala College (Test)
- TV: Dialog TV, PeoTv
- Website: ThePapare.com, Batsman.com
- 74th Battle of the Golds

Battle of the Golds (Also known as Sri Sumangala College - Moratu Maha Vidyalaya Cricket Encounter) is an annual Big Match played between Sri Sumangala College and Moratu Maha Vidyalaya since 1934. It is known as The Battle of the Golds due to the colours of the two schools' flags i.e. Green, Gold and Blue of Sri Sumangala College and Maroon, Gold & Maroon of Moratu Maha Vidyalaya.

== History ==
The first encounter between the two schools dates back to 1934. The first match in the sequence was played in 1934 under the captain, W. Lionel Fernando of Sri Sumangala College and H. N. Samarasinghe of Moratu Maha Vidyalaya. The first victory for Sumangalians was in 1962 under the Captaincy of P. P. Silva while the first victory for Moraliyans was in 1956 under the Captaincy of T. Hapugoda. Of the 74 big matches played between the two schools until 2026, Sumangalians has won 08 and Moraliyans 07, with the rest being declared draw.

The first victory for Sumangalians was in 1962 under the captaincy of S. Sigera while the first victory for Moraliyans was in 1956 under the captaincy of T. Hapugoda.

The last time Sri Sumangala College won the Battle of the Golds was in 2007 under the captaincy of Iresh Pushpakumara and for Moratu Maha Vidyalaya it was in 2010 under the captaincy of Anuruddhika Kalhara.

Among the many successes of Sri Sumangala College, Iresh Pushpakumara's 08 wickets in an inning in 2007 big match is the best bowling figure so far in the history and Roshan Wimalasena's 153 in 1996 in the highest score in the history. In 1981 big match Ravin Wickramaratne set another record by scoring an unbeaten 104 runs and taking 5 wickets with a hat trick. Interestingly, Wickramarathna has also been elected as the Vice President of Sri Lanka Cricket in the recent past, from his previous tenure as Assistant Secretary. A few other victories for Sumangalians include 1975 Captain Tissa Eleperuma representing Ceylon Team before the test status was granted, 1983 Captain Don Anurasiri being the first Sumangalian to present Sri Lanka's test cricket team, who was subsequently followed by 1995 Captain Indika Gallage and 2001 Captain Dilruwan Perera. In 2023, 2023 captain Vishwa Lahiru was selected to represent the Sri Lanka U19 National Team and in 2024 in the U19 World Cup.

A few other remarkable cricketers in the local playing field who began their cricketing career at Sri Sumangala include, Kaushal Silva before playing for St Thomas's College; Kithuruwan Vithanage before joining Royal College, Colombo and U13 and U15 Captain Oshada Fernando before joining St Sebastian's College, Moratuwa. While Kithruwan Vithanage earned his spot in the Sri Lanka team from 2013 to 2016, Kaushal Silva and Oshada Fernando are still a part of the Sri Lankan team.

Moratu Maha Vidyala holds the unique record of becoming the one and only school in Sri Lanka which has produced national cricketers both in men's and women's categories. Sarath Fernando and Bernard Perera of Moratu Maha Vidyalaya represented the nation before Sri Lanka obtained the test status.

Ajantha Mendis from Moratu Maha Vidyalaya who reintroduced mystery to spin bowling was the first test player to represent Sri Lanka followed by Nishan Madushka. Further, former Sri Lankan player, Hasantha Fernando played up to under 15 in Moratu Maha Vidyalaya and Lucky Roger represented the Sri Lankan under-19 team in 1988. Inoshi Fernando and Upeksha Thabrew represented the nation in women's cricket who are old girls of Moratu Maha Vidyalaya.

The one day encounters, which began 28 years ago in 1993, have resulted in 17 victories for Sumangalians, 11 for Moraliyans, 02 matches where no decision was taken and a match not played in 2001 and 2021 due to COVID.

== Past Results ==
=== Big Matches ===
1. Sri Sumangala College (11.0%)
2. Moratu Maha Vidyalaya (9.59%)
3. Drawn (79.5%)

Results of the Big Matches

- Matches Played - 74
- Matches Drawn - 59
- Matches Won by Sri Sumangala College - 08
- Matches Won by Moratu Maha Vidyalaya - 07

==== Records ====
Sri Sumangala College:

- Highest Score: 153 by Roshan Wimalasena in 1996
- Best Bowling: 8 wickets by Iresh Pushpakumara in 2007
- Highest Total: 408/7 in 2026
- Lowest Total: 42 in 1979

Moratu Maha Vidyalaya:

- Highest Score: 129 by Ranjith Fernando in 1979
- Best Bowling: 8 for 53 by Manjula Peiris in 1980
- Highest Total: 357/9 in 1956
- Lowest Total: 36 in 1973

==== Result Table ====
Year	SSC		MMV		Result	Ref.
Year	1st Ings	2nd Ings	1st Ings	2nd Ings	Result	Ref.
1934					Drawn	
1935					No Data	
1936					Drawn	
1937					Drawn	
1938					Drawn	
1939					Drawn	
1940					Drawn	
1941 - 1947 No Data
1948					Drawn	
1949					Drawn	
1950					Drawn	
1951					Drawn	
1952					No Data	
1953					Drawn	
1954					Drawn	
1955					Drawn	
1956	171	73	357/9		Won by Moratu Maha Vidyalaya	
1957	230	78/7	149	99/5	Drawn	
1958					Drawn	
1959					Won by Moratu Maha Vidyalaya	
1960					Won by Moratu Maha Vidyalaya	
1961					Won by Moratu Maha Vidyalaya	
1962					Won by Sri Sumangala College	
1963					Won by Moratu Maha Vidyalaya	
1964					No Data	
1965 - 1967 Not Played
1968					No Data	
1969	122	162/3	140	140/9	Won by Sri Sumangala College	
1970					Not Played	
1971	105	58	208	-	Won by Moratu Maha Vidyalaya	
1972	156	123	119	115/9	Drawn	
1973			36		Won by Sri Sumangala College	
1974	178	77/5	136	170	Drawn	
1975					No Data	
1976	110/8	33/0	207/8	133/8	Drawn	
1977					Not Played	
1978	323/6	-	45	92	Won by Sri Sumangala College	
1979	235	-	42	80	Won by Sri Sumangala College	
1980	117	143	53	106	Won by Sri Sumangala College	
1981	155	136/5	114	45/8	Drawn	
1982	122	173/4	141/9	64/8	Drawn	
1983	177	140/8	178/8	93/3	Drawn	
1984	179/8		70	118/5	Drawn	
1985	131		13/0		Drawn	
1986	122/9	41/2	128/8	81/6	Drawn	
1987	164/6	73/7	66/9	31/0	Drawn	
1988					No Data	
1989	186/8		128/9	119/7	Drawn	
1990	124/7	74/4	115	132/8	Drawn	
1991	179/9	108/8	126	86/2	Drawn	
1992	219/6	127/4	150	71/5	Drawn	
1993	226/7	65/4	188/7	158/6	Drawn	
1994	250/5	82/2	181	64/4	Drawn	
1995	188	32/4	197	113/7	Drawn	
1996	274	107/7	182	50/0	Drawn	
1997	259/9	20/2	190		Drawn	
1998					No Data	
1999	220	163/7	202	108/5	Drawn	
2000	218/7		216/8	54/4	Drawn	
2001					Not Played	
2002	233		184		Drawn	
2003	156/9	123/1	155	126/6	Won by Sri Sumangala College	
2004	137		159	64/4	Drawn	
2005					Not Played	
2006	282/6	138/8	202	62/3	Drawn	
2007	354/7	35/4	235	155	Won by Sri Sumangala College	
2008	229	154/5	232/9		Drawn	
2009	200	199/8	174	116/3	Drawn	
2010	81	189	313/9		Won by Moratu Maha Vidyalaya	
2011	108	134	103	75/5	Drawn	
2012	226		116	203/4	Drawn	
2013	150/8	74/2	207/6	116/7	Drawn	
2014	202	185/8	123		Drawn	
2015	179	145/8	240		Drawn	
2016			244		Drawn	
2017	237/9		121	156	Drawn	
2018	140	71/1	210/9	120/4	Drawn	
2019	192	124/7d	131	37/4	Drawn	
2020	150/8	74/2	207/6	113/7	Drawn	
2021	173/6	N/A	123	N/A	Drawn	
2022	109	76/2	96	180/8d	Drawn	
2023	86/3	-	144	-	Drawn - Match stopped due to Rain	
2024	282/8	157/4	227	-	Drawn	
2025	144	-	87	217/7	Drawn	
2026	408/7	134/2	272	97/1	Drawn	

=== Limited Over matches ===
1. SSC (53.1%)
2. MMV (34.4%)
3. No Decision (6.25%)
4. Not Played (6.25%)

Results of the Limited Over matches

- Matches Played - 33
- Matches Won by Sri Sumangala College - 18
- Matches Won by Moratu Maha Vidyalaya - 11
- Matches with No Decision - 02
- Matches Not Played - 02

==== Records ====
Sri Sumangala College

- Highest Total: 289/7 in 2026
- Lowest Total: 102/3 in 2006

Moratu Maha Vidyalaya:

- Highest Total: 240/8 in 2009
- Lowest Total: 62 in 2007

==== Result Table ====
Year	SSC	MMV	Result	Ref.
1993	142	163	Won by Moratu Maha Vidyalaya	
1994			Won by Sri Sumangala College	
1995			Won by Moratu Maha Vidyalaya	
1996			Won by Moratu Maha Vidyalaya	
1997			Won by Sri Sumangala College	
1998	168/8	167	Won by Sri Sumangala College	
1999	150	220	Won by Moratu Maha Vidyalaya	
2000	128/8	199	Won by Moratu Maha Vidyalaya	
2001			Not Played	
2002	121/8	111	Won by Sri Sumangala College	
2003	202/8	188	Won by Sri Sumangala College	
2004	126/8	129/6	Won by Moratu Maha Vidyalaya	
2005	148/6	147	Won by Sri Sumangala College	
2006	102/3	101	Won by Sri Sumangala College	
2007	158	62	Won by Sri Sumangala College	
2008	141	206	Won by Moratu Maha Vidyalaya	
2009	237/9	240/8	Won by Moratu Maha Vidyalaya	
2010	158	163/7	Won by Moratu Maha Vidyalaya	
2011	204	166/4	No Decision	
2012	198	206	Won by Moratu Maha Vidyalaya	
2013	196	60/0	No Decision	
2014	252	161	Won by Sri Sumangala College	
2015	240/6	239	Won by Sri Sumangala College	
2016	146	196	Won by Moratu Maha Vidyalaya	
2017	272	212	Won by Sri Sumangala College	
2018	224	134	Won by Sri Sumangala College	
2019	109/5	108	Won by Sri Sumangala College	
2020	220	148	Won by Sri Sumangala College	
2021			Not Played due to COVID-19	
2022	218	119	Won by Sri Sumangala College	
2023	152	153/7	Won by Moratu Maha Vidyalaya	
2024	217	192/9	Won by Sri Sumangala College	
2025	235/6	96	Won by Sri Sumangala College	
2026	289/7	199	Won by Sri Sumangala College	

== Captains of Series ==
Year	Sri Sumangala College'	Moratu Maha Vidyalaya
1934	W. Lionel Fernando	H. N. Samarasinghe
1935	W. Lionel Fernando	No Data
1936	No Data	Wily Wijerathna
1937	No Data	Lionel Fernando
1938	No Data	Nelson F. Gunarathna
1939	No Data	Samson F. Gunarathna
1940	No Data	Ariyawansa Weerakkody
1941	No Data	No Data
1942	No Data	No Data
1943	No Data	No Data
1944	No Data	No Data
1945	No Data	No Data
1946	No Data	No Data
1947	No Data	No Data
1948	No Data	T. L. Fernando
1949	No Data	M. S. Fernando
1950	No Data	P. C. H. Fernando
1951	No Data	Ramsey Jayasuriya
1952	No Data	No Data
1953	No Data	D. Fernando
1954	No Data	D. Fernando
1955	Shelvin Fonseka	D. Fernando
1956	Shelton Jayathilaka	T. Hapugoda
1957	P. K. Sirisena	H. Perera
1958	P. Gaminiratne	G. S. Perera
1959	P. Gaminiratne	S. S. Jayawickrama
1960	T. Dharmawardana & B.S Wijesingha	A. Peiris
1961	P. H. Asoka De Silva	K. C. L. Perera
1962	P. P. Silva & S. Sigera	B. Perera
1963	Kingsley Mendis	D. Fernando
1964	Murphy Perera & G. A. Deepal	No Data
1965	Sarath Gunawardana	A. Perera
1966	P. Salgado	M. Jayasinghe
1967	P. Salgado	H. J. Nandasena
1968	C. Kalupahana	S. Dharmabandu
1969	S. Jayasooriya	C. Fernando
1970	Premalal Fernando	R. C. Silva & C. Wickramasinghe
1971	Mohandas Soysa & Linton Kodikara	Anura Weerasyriya
1972	Lional Fernando	Desmon Fernando
1973	Lional Fernando	Asoka Ekanayaka
1974	Berty Perera	Deepal Fernando
1975	Tissa Eleperuma	Loyd Perera
1976	Anurath Abeyratne	Thawseer Khan
1977	Osmand Perera	Susil Mendis
1978	Kumara Jayasooriya	Dayantha Kithsiri
1979	Suranjith Aponso	Methsiri Thenuwara
1980	Nalin Wikramasinghe	Herbat NIssanka
1981	A. K. D. Samankumara	Bandula Fernando
1982	Aravinda Weerasinghe	Athula Wickramathilaka
1983	Don Anurasiri	Chandranath De Alwis
1984	P. D. Ajith	Chandana Mahesh
1985	Chinthaka Peiris	Saman Graro & Prasanna Dissanayake
1986	A. K. D. Kalum Sanjeewa	Prasanna Dissanayake
1987	Kanishka Aravinda Perera	Rohan Jayaweera
1988	Manoj Dharmarathna	Sudath Hapugoda
1989	Samitha Batawala	Lucky Roger Fernando
1990	Rohan Soysa	Indrajith Nishantha
1991	Indunil Wijesuriya	Sanath Ananda
1992	Indika Peiris	Nihal Samantha
1993	Arosha Peiris	Nalaka Perera
1994	Manjula Silva	Deepal Samantha Peiris
1995	Indika Gallage	Dinesh Suranga
1996	Kelum Rathnaweera	Viraj Sujeewa Fernando
1997	Roshan Wimalasena	Dhammika Wickramanayaka
1998	Amila Perera	Asitha Perera
1999	Sandakan Perera	Oshada Warnapura
2000	Suresh Silva	Manoj Deshapriya
2001	Dilruwan Perera	Warna Ransila
2002	Jayathu Neelaweera	Sampath Perera
2003	Jayathu Neelaweera	Radeesha Fonseka
2004	Migara Kanishka Perera	Ashan Bandara
2005	Sudesh Umayanga	Raju gayashan & Suminda Priyankara
2006	Sahan Fernando	Akila Sameera
2007	Iresh Pushpakumara	Akila Sameera
2008	Charith Molligoda	Ashan Roshan
2009	Niwanka Abeyrathna	Lasitha Madushanka
2010	Chathura Neelaweera	Anuruddhika Kalhara
2011	Vimukthi Kaushal Fernando	Avishka Peiris
2012	Aruna Dharmasena	Sanka Ramesh
2013	Tharuka Nadeeshan	Ishan Nilaksha
2014	Geeth Sanjaya	Harsha Devinda
2015	Lahiru Vimukthi	Thilan Kavishka
2016	Vishwa Yasas	Shanuka Madushan
2017	Samith Yasantha	Sineth Isuru
2018	Nipuna Deshan	Nishan Madushka Fernando
2019	Janinu Inuwara	Shehada Nichendra
2020	Anuka Jayasinghe	Madushan Dilakshana
2021	Tharana De Silva	Rashan Kavishka
2022	Prabash Jayasekara	Madura Fernando
2023	Vishwa Lahiru	Sukitha Dewthilina
2024	Vidusha Peiris	Mahith Appuhamy
2025	Duranka Silva	Isuru Fernando
2026	Mavindu Kumarasiri	Vihaga Nethsara

== Batting and Bowling Records ==
=== Sri Sumangala College Team ===
Batting and Bowling Records by Sri Sumangala College team's Players in big matches.

==== Batting ====
===== Centuries =====
Score	Player	Year
153	Roshan Wimalasena	1996
138	P. Gaminiratne	
136	Neksha Iddamalgoda	2026
131	Buddhika Perera	1994
130	P. K. Sirisena	
116	Sandeep Wijerathne	2026
110*	Tharindu Thushan Fernando	2006
108	S. Aponso	
104*	Ravin Wickramaratne	
100*	Manoj Fernando	1997

==== Bowling ====
===== Best bowling in an Innings =====
Wickets	Player	Year
8 wickets	Iresh Pushpakumara	2007
7 for 12	Mohan Fonseka (One Day Encounter)	2007
7 for 21	Ravin Wickramaratne	1978
7 for 23	Lahiru Vimukth	2014
7 for 27	Kanishka Aravinda Perera	1987
7 for 38 & 7 for 62	Anuka Jayasinghe	2017
7 for 107	Mevindu Kumarasiri	2026
6 for 16	Jayantha Mendis	1974
6 for 24	Nuwan Queentus (One Day Encounter)	2000
6 for 27	Tissa Eleperuma	
6 for 51	Buddhi Perera	2009
6 for 56	T. Dharmawardana	
6 for 58	Jayantha Mendis	
5 for 26 (Including a hat-trick)	Ravin Wickramaratne	1981
5 for 28	Mevindu Kumarasiri	2025
5 for 29 (One Day Encounter)	Bihanga Silva	2025
5 for 29 (One Day Encounter)	Manmitha Dulran	2022
5 for 30	Dilruwan Perera	1999
5 for 36	Kalum Rathnaweera	1996
5 for 40	Amila Perera	1998
5 for 70	M. de Mel	

=== Moratu Maha Vidyalaya Team ===
Batting and Bowling Records by Moratu Maha Vidyalaya team's Players in big matches.

==== Batting ====
===== Centuries =====
Year	Player	Score
1976	Ranjith Fernando	129
2026	Oshanda Jayawickrama	117
1956	H. Fernando	107
2026	Deneth Sithumina	105

==== Bowling ====
===== Best bowling in an Innings =====
Year	Player	Wickets
1956	T. Hapugoda	6 for 45
1957	S. W. Fernando	5 for 13
1957	P. D. Dharmasena	5 for 70
1972	B. Gunasekara	5 for 37
1974	M. Azhar	5 for 22
1980	Manjula Peiris	8 for 53
1980	Jayasena Silva	7 for 49
1982	Chandika Mahesh	5 for 14
1984	Chandika Mahesh	5 for 71
1988	Saman Kandage	6 for 43
1996	Jayasiri Rajapaksha	5 for 77
1999	Chamara Dilruk	5 for 52
2002	Ajantha Mendis	6 for 52
2004	Suminda Priyankara	5 for 36
2011	Janidu Devinda	5 for 52

== Family Members Who Played In The Series ==
=== Brothers In The Series ===
==== Sri Sumangala College ====
Brothers who Captained Sri Sumangala College

- A. K. D. Samankumara (1981)
- A. K. D. Kalum Sanjeewa (1986)

Brothers who Captained Moratu Maha Vidyalaya

- Nishan Madushka Fernando (2019)
- Isuru Fernando (2025)

Brothers who played for the Sri Sumangala College

- Selvin De Fonseka
- Simpson Greshan De Fonseka
- Earnest Mervin De Fonseka
- Sarath Jayasooriya
- Kumar Jayasooriya
- Asitha Rathnaweera
- Kalum Rathnaweera (1993/1994)

=== Fathers & Sons In The Series ===
==== Sri Sumangala College ====
Fathers & Sons who Captained for the Sri Sumangala College

- A. K. D. Samankumara (1981)
- Janidu Inuwara (2019)

- Arosha Peiris (1993)
- Vidusha Peiris (2024)

Fathers & Sons who Played for the Sri Sumangala College

- Dodridge Soysa (Dad)
- Mohandaz Soysa (Son)

== Venues ==
- De Soysa Stadium, Moratuwa (formerly known as Tyronne Fernando Stadium)
- Panadura Esplanade (Home ground of the Panadura Sports Club)

== Noted ==
- Students of Sri Sumangala College are known as Sumangalians
- Students of Moratu Maha Vidyalaya are known as Moraliyans
