= Susantha Mendis =

Sri Lankan Army general (1951–1998)

Major General Susantha Mendis † USP, DPS
- Born: 1951
- Died: 11 September 1998 (aged 46–47); Jaffna, Sri Lanka
- Alma mater: St. Sylvester's College
- Military career
- Allegiance: Sri Lanka
- Branch: Sri Lanka Army
- Service years: 1970–1998
- Rank: Major General (posthumous)
- Unit: Sri Lanka Sinha Regiment
- Commands: 51-2 Brigade
- Conflicts: 1971 Insurrection; Insurrection 1987-89; Sri Lankan Civil War
- Awards: Uttama Seva Padakkama; Desha Putra Sammanaya

Major General B.B. Susantha Mendis, USP (1951 – 11 September 1998) was a Sri Lanka Army general, who was the former Commanding Officer of 51-2 Brigade based in Jaffna.

== Early life and education ==
Mendis was educated at St Sylvester's College, Kandy.

== Military career ==
He joined the Sri Lanka Army as an officer cadet and received his basic officer training at the Army Training Centre, Diyatalawa. He was commissioned as a Second Lieutenant in the Sinha Regiment. During his career he held many positions within the army including that of Commanding Officer, 1st Battalion, Sri Lanka Singh Regiment. Brigadier Mendis was Commanding Officer of 51-2 Brigade attached to the 51 Division.

== Death ==
On 11 September 1998, he attended a meeting at the office of the Mayor of Jaffna to discuss traffic arrangements in the town of Jaffna. The Liberation Tigers of Tamil Eelam (LTTE) detonated a bomb in the office killing 12 persons including Brigadier Mendis, Mayor Pon Sivapalan, SSP Chandra Perera, Captain Ramanayaka, the Brigadier's Principal Staff Officer (PSO) and four police officers. Also killed were S Pathamanathan, Commissioner for Rehabilitation of the Jaffna Municipality and Architect Mallika Rajaratnam. Brigadier Mendis was posthumously promoted to the rank of Major General.
