= Jayampathy Wickramaratne =

Sri Lankan lawyer and politician

Hon. Jayampathy Wickramaratne PC

Member of Parliament for National List
- In office 1 September 2015 – 23 January 2020
- Succeeded by: Saman Rathnapriya

Personal details
- Party: United Left Front

Jayampathy Wickramaratne, PC is a Sri Lankan lawyer and politician. He was a national list member representing the United Left Front in the 2015 Parliament. A former director of Programs of the Institute of Constitutional Studies in Colombo, he has served as a Senior Adviser to the Ministry of Constitutional Affairs and was a member of the Sri Lankan Law Commission. He entered parliament in 2015 General Election from the National List of the United National Front for Good Governance (UNFGG) coalition representing the United Left Front. He was also appointed as the Parliamentary Secretary to the Prime Minister to be in charge of the Constitutional Assembly process during the Yahapalana (Good Governance) government. Wickramaratne was the key person behind the proposed 2018 constitution of Sri Lanka.

== Education ==
Wickramaratne was educated at St. Anthony's College, Kandy and St. Sylvester's College, Kandy. After successfully completed his GCE Advance Level examination he entered the Science Faculty of University of Peradeniya, studying chemistry. Later entered the Law College, where he qualified as a lawyer. He holds a PhD in Human rights and a Master of Public Administration from University of Peradeniya. Wickramaratne was appointed a President's Counsel in 2001. He obtained his second PhD degree for his published work, 'Democratic Governance in Sri Lanka: A Constitutional Miscellany' from the University of Colombo

== Member of the Parliament 2015-2020 ==
Although Wickramaratne was a leftist, having been a member of the Lanka Sama Samaja Party for a long time, in 2015 August election he was appointed as a national list MP of the United National Front for Good Governance (UNFGG) in which he represented the United Left Front. As he was a key architect of the 2015 Nineteenth Amendment which prohibits non-citizens from entering parliament or contesting in Presidential elections. It was specifically aimed at preventing Gotabaya Rajapaksa, at the time an American citizen, from entering Sri Lankan politics or running for president.

The 2015 constitution which he participated to draft was abolished on 22 October 2020 and a new amendment was passed at the Sri Lanka parliament.
