= Chathura Alwis =

Sri Lankan journalist

- චතුර අල්විස්
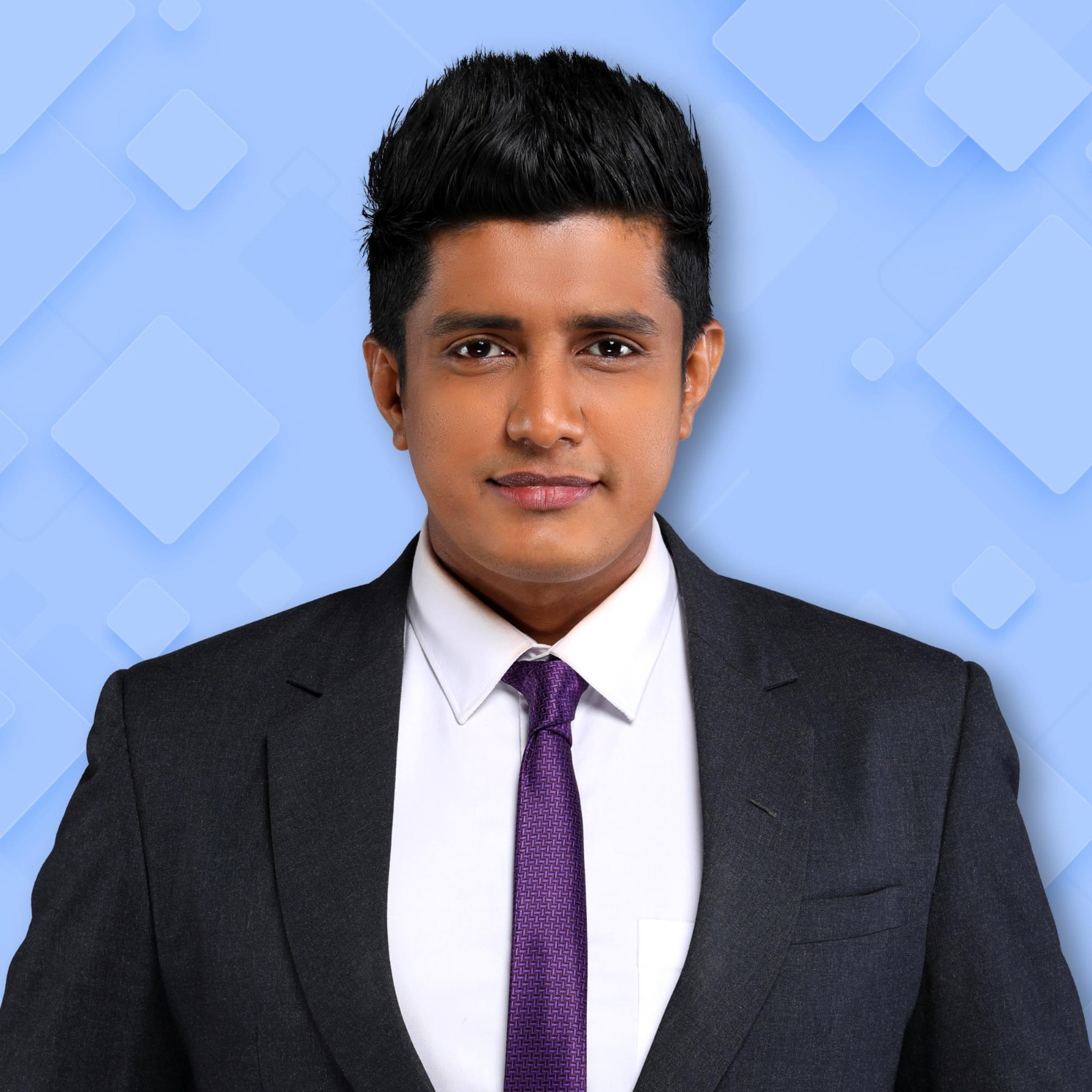
- Born: May 15, 1986 (age 39); Panadura, Sri Lanka (prior to 1983–1986)
- Education: Sri Sumangala College, Panadura; Thurstan College, Colombo
- Occupation: Journalist
- Years active: 2006–present
- Television: Lokaya Saha Lokayo; Derana Aruna; Talk with Chathura; Wada Pitiya; Travel with Chatura

Chathura Alwis (Sinhala: චතුර අල්විස්; born 15 May 1986) is a Sri Lankan journalist. He attended the Sri Sumangala College in Panadura for his primary education and Thurstan College in Colombo for further studies. In 2017, he won the "Most Popular Journalist on Social Media" award at the Mashable World Social Media Day Awards. He was also awarded the SLIM-Nielsen Peoples' Award for Best Television Presenter in 2018, 2019, and 2020.

== Awards ==
Year	Nominee / work	Award	Result
2018	Chathura Alwis	SLIM-Nielsen Peoples Awards Best television presenter	Won
2019	Chathura Alwis	SLIM-Nielsen Peoples Awards Best television presenter	Won
2020	Chathura Alwis	SLIM-Nielsen Peoples Awards Best television presenter	Won
2021	Chathura Alwis	SLIM-Nielsen Peoples Awards Peoples Television Presenter of the Year	Won
2022	Chathura Alwis	SLIM-Nielsen Peoples Awards Peoples Television Presenter of the Year	Won
2023	Chathura Alwis	SLIM-Nielsen Peoples Awards Peoples Television Presenter of the Year	Won
2024	Chathura Alwis	SLIM-Nielsen Peoples Awards Peoples Television Presenter of the Year	Won
2025	Chathura Alwis	SLIM-Nielsen Peoples Awards Peoples Television Presenter of the Year	Won
