= Eric Fernando =

Eric Fernando was a popular English-language broadcaster with the Sri Lanka Broadcasting Corporation. He presented a range of radio programs both over the home and the All Asia services of the SLBC.

Eric was educated at Prestigious St Sylvester's College Kandy.

Eric Fernando was Sri Lanka's first Television Newscaster and a well known interviewer on SLRC or State Television.

In 1998 Fernando was appointed Director-General of the Sri Lanka Broadcasting Corporation. He took a keen interest in the UNESCO assisted Kotmale Project - the community radio program of the SLBC.In 2001 he assumed duties as Director General of the Policy Research and Information Unit at the Office of the President of Sri Lanka, he was also the head of the Presidential Media Unit.

== See also ==
- Vernon Corea
- Sri Lanka Broadcasting Corporation
