= Sri Sumangala College =

- ශ්‍රී සුමංගල විද්‍යාලය; ஶ்ரீ சுமங்கல கல்லூரி
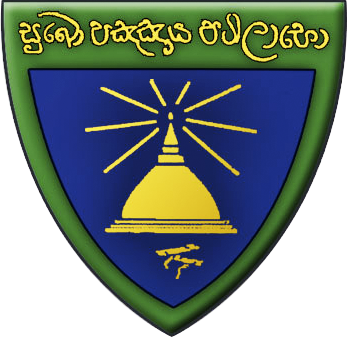

- Sri Sumangala College Main Building

Location
- Horana Road; Panadura; Sri Lanka; 6°42′31″N 79°54′53″E

Information
- Type: National
- Motto: Pali: සුඛෝ පඤඤාය පටිලාභෝ Suko Pagngnaya Patilabho (Joy is the result of Wisdom)
- Established: 3 March 1909; 117 years ago
- Founder: Gnanawimalathissa Maha, Walpita Gunarathana Maha
- Sister school: Sri Sumangala Balika Maha Vidyalaya
- School code: SSC
- Principal: Raweendra Pushpakumara
- Grades: 1–13
- Gender: Boys
- Age range: 6 to 19
- Enrollment: 4,000
- Language: Sinhala and English
- Colours: Blue, yellow and green
- Affiliation: Buddhist
- Alumni: Sumangalians
- Annual Cricket battle: Battle of the Golds (Panadura and Moratuwa) with Moratu Maha Vidyala
- Website: Sri Sumangala College

Sri Sumangala College (Sinhala: ශ්‍රී සුමංගල විද්‍යාලය), in Panadura, Sri Lanka, was founded on 3 March 1909 at Rankoth Viharaya, in memory of Ven. Weligama Sri Sumangala Thero, who played an important role in Sri Lankan Buddhism. It is one of the oldest and the largest schools in Sri Lanka with a student population of 4,000 over 13 Grades. It is a national school, controlled by the central government.

== History ==
In 1911 when this school was registered as an assisted school, there were 325 students on roll. The first principal was Thomas E. Gunarathne.

The land for the school was donated by the Rankoth Viharaya while the buildings were constructed out of public funds. The school was managed by a Board of Management and funds for the running of the school were met by philanthropists and the general public.

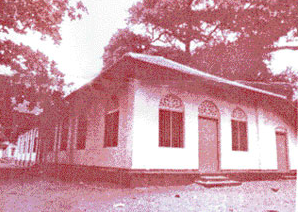
The Panadura Town Branch, first building was at Rankoth viharaya premises.

Due to the rapid expansion of the college, the Rankoth Viharaya premises became congested and there was the necessity to re-locate the college. The manager of the Board of Management tried to relocate to Walawa Waththa in 1942, where Sri Sumangala College is presently located. When this failed, the management decided to shift the college to Nalluruwa. The first old boy of the college, Walter Salgado, donated the land for the main buildings and M. C. Fernando donated about 1.0 ha (2.5 acres) to be used as the playground of the college.

The funds for building the main hall of the building complex were donated by Leo Fernando; physics, chemistry and biology laboratories were donated by P. C. H. Dias and the main building and the class rooms were built with public donations.

All the classes from grade six upwards were taken to Nalluruwa new buildings on 7 August 1942. Grades 3, 4 and 5 were continued at the Rankoth Viharaya premises and it was popularly called town branch of the college. The principal or the head of this section was A. C. Morawaka who served the college until his retirement.

With the transfer of the college to Nalluruwa it became one of the leading educational institutions where laboratory facilities were available for the students to do science subjects in the medium of English. Advance level students of the Sri Sumangala Girls School used the laboratories in the afternoons to do their practicals. The plot of land between the main college and the play ground was eventually acquired by the Education Department.

In 1961 a large number of schools were taken over by the government and the town branch was registered as a separate school with a principal being appointed by the Education Department. A precedent was created to admit all the children who leave town branch after they passed the grade five test. In 1992 due to inclement weather the retaining wall of the Rankoth Viharaya collapsed damaging the main hall of the town branch. The school had to be kept closed for a few months. The Old Boys Association, parents and well wishers constructed 18 semi-permanent class rooms and the Town Branch was amalgamated to the main college.

On 25 May 1993 the College was declared a National School by the Ministry of Education.

On 26 December 2004 the tsunami which destroyed the southern and eastern coastal areas damaged part of the semi-permanent buildings of the college. The 2004 Indian Ocean tsunami struck during a school vacation so no injuries were recorded.

All together 182 schools were damaged by the tsunami. Out of these damaged school the government has decided to re-locate 98 schools including Sri Sumangala College. Donor partner JICA granted a Rs. 330 million loan to build a completely new school with all the modern facilities.

It is a coincidence of fate that the Sri Sumangala College has to be moved to a location five decades later that the Board of Management had initially planned on in 1942, before finally settling for the site in Nalluruwa.

== Founders ==
- Ven. Gnanawimalathissa Maha Thero (lived in Panadura Rankoth Viharaya)
- Ven. Walpita Gunarathana Thissabidana Amarapura Maha Nikaye Thero

== Notable alumni ==
Notable former students of Sri Sumangala College (known as Old Sumangalians), include:

Name	Notability	Reference
W. D. Amaradeva	violinist, vocalist, composer	
Premasiri Khemadasa	music director, composer	
Don Anurasiri	international cricket player (1986–1998)	
Dilruwan Perera	international cricket player (2014–present)	
Indika Gallage	international cricket player (1999)	
Kithuruwan Vithanage	international cricket player (2013–2015)	
Kaushal Silva	international cricket player (2011–present)	
Nandana Gunathilake	Member of Parliament	"Nandana Gunathilake".
Channa Perera	Actor, director, producer, screen writer	
Chathura Alwis	journalist	
Sanka Dineth	musician, composer and songwriter	
Neville Fernando	physician, member of parliament for Panadura (1977–1989)	"Neville Fernando".
Anupa Pasqual	Member of parliament for Kalutara (2020–24)	"Anupa Pasqual".

== Principals ==
Following is a list of past Principals of the Sri Sumangala College;

Name	Entered office
Thomas E. Gunaratne	1909
W. Charls De Silva	1912
T. S. Anirawan	1915
C. E. Setrange	1916
D. C. Ranasinghe	1919
R. S. S. Gunawardena	1921
A. Ginige	1922
A. M. De Silva	1940
T. N. K. Chandrasekara	1941
P. J. Jayaratne	1941
P. D. S. Kularatne	1943
M. W. Karunananda	1945
D. W. J. Perera	1945
A. J. Fernando	1947
K. L. V. Alagiyawanna	1954
R. A. Marthas	1962
C. H. J. Weerasooriya	1963
Arther Ranasinghe	1969
H. R. Perera	1970
W. Kahandagama	1972
S. Wijeweera	1973
M. D. L. Fernando	1975
A. G. Weththasinghe	1975
D. D. Wijemanna	1977
A. G. De Silva	1979
H. S. N. K. Fernando	1987
G. D. K. Perera	1990
J. K. P. Ashokaratne	1991
D. E. Jayaneththi	1992
L.W Somathilake	2003
Tilak De Silva	2015
Dimuthu Priyankara Deranagoda	2018
L. G. P. B. Liyangaskumbura	2020
W. P. N. D. Weerasinghe	2022
Raweendra Pushpakumara	2023 - incumbent

== Sri Sumangala College Old Boys ==
The Sri Sumangala College Old Boys Association, also known as the Old Boys’ Association of Sri Sumangala College, Panadura (SSCOBA), was established on 28 October 1922.
