= SLIM-Kantar Peoples Awards =

Award ceremony in Sri Lanka

- Current: 16th SLIM-Kantar Peoples Awards 2022
- Trophy of the award
- Awarded for: Excellence in personalities and media brands
- Country: Sri Lanka
- Presented by: Sri Lanka Institute of Marketing (SLIM); Kantar Group; Nielsen Company Lanka (Pvt) Ltd. (Formerly)
- Formerly called: SLIM-Nielsen Peoples Awards (2006–2021)
- First award: 2006
- Final award: 21 March 2022
- Website: peoplesawards.lk

SLIM-Kantar Peoples Awards (Sinhala: ස්ලිම්-කැන්ටාර් ජනතා සම්මාන) is an award given to distinguished individuals involved with Sri Lanka's media brands and personalities each year. It is the joint work of Sri Lanka Institute of Marketing (SLIM) with Kantar Group, United Kingdom. The awards show is one of the most popular marketing program events in Sri Lanka.

The awardees are chosen solely by people's votes, through research conducted by Nielsen Sri Lanka. The awards were first introduced in 2006 and continued without interruptions.

== History ==
Established in 2006 the concept was started by Nielsen Company. Awardees are chosen by vote, through comprehensive nationwide research. The first survey spanned a period of one year. Randomly-selected males and females between the ages of 18 and 50 years were interviewed in all 25 districts.

== Awards ==
The awards are distributed across 45 different categories of media, marketing, banking, telecommunication, sports, drama and singing. In 2018, Fashion Retail Brand and FMCG Retail Brand of the Year were added.

=== Categories ===
- People's Brand of the Year
- Durable Brand of the Year
- Housing and Construction Brand of the Year
- FMCG Brand of the Year
- Personal Care Brand of the Year
- Household Care Brand of the Year
- Beverage Brand of the Year
- Hot Beverage Brand of the Year
- Food Brand of the Year
- Service Brand Of The Year
- Telecom Service Provider of the Year
- Internet Service Provider of the Year
- Banking Service Provider of the Year
- Financial Service Provider of the Year
- Life Insurance Service Provider of the Year
- General Insurance Service Provider of the Year
- Television Chanel of the Year
- Radio Chanel of the Year
- People's News Provider of the Year
- News Paper of the Year
- Advertisement of the Year
- Film of the Year
- Teledrama of the Year
- Television Program of the Year
- People's Song of the Year
- Radio Program of the Year
- Male and Female Singer of the Year
- Actor and Actress of the Year
- Sports Person of the Year
- Tele-Drama Actor and Actress of the Year
- Television Presenter of the Year
- Radio Presenter of the Year
- Fashion Retail Brand of the Year
- FMCG Retail Brand of the Year
- Youth Brand of the Year
- Youth FMCG Brand of the Year
- Youth Beverage Brand of the Year
- Youth Food Brand of the Year
- Youth Television Channel of the Year
- Youth Radio Station of the Year
- Youth Actor and Actress of the Year

== Ceremonies ==
- 2017 – The 11th Awards ceremony was held on 10 March 2017, at Waters Edge.
- 2018 – The 12th Awards ceremony was held on 9 March 2018, at Waters Edge.
- 2021 - The 15th Awards ceremony was held on 23 March 2021, at BMICH.
- 2022 - The 16th Awards ceremony was held on 21 March 2022, at Monarch Imperial

== Awardees ==
- Chathura Alwis, Best Television Presenter in 2018, 2019, and 2020
