= Ceylon at the 1962 British Empire and Commonwealth Games =

- CG code: CEY
- CGA: Ceylon Olympic and Commonwealth Games Association
- Website: srilankaolympic.org

in Perth, Western Australia
- Competitors: 2 in 2 sports
- Flag bearers: Opening: Closing:
- Medals: Gold 0 Silver 0 Bronze 0 Total 0

British Empire and Commonwealth Games appearances
- 1938; 1950; 1954; 1958; 1962; 1966; 1970; 1974; 1978; 1982; 1986; 1990; 1994; 1998; 2002; 2006; 2010; 2014; 2018; 2022; 2026; 2030

The Dominion of Ceylon competed at the 1962 British Empire and Commonwealth Games in Perth, Western Australia, from 22 November to 1 December 1962.

== Boxing ==
Athlete	Event	Round 1	Round 2	Final	
Athlete	Event	Opposition Result	Opposition Result	Opposition Result	Rank
Malcolm Bulner	Men's lightweight	Blair (AUS); L points	did not advance		

== Wrestling ==
Key:

- VT - Victory by Fall.
- PP - Decision by Points - the loser with technical points.
- PO - Decision by Points - the loser without technical points.

Athlete	Event	Round 1	Round 2	Round 3	Round 4	Rank
Athlete	Event	Opposition Result	Opposition Result	Opposition Result	Opposition Result	Rank
Alexander Fernando	Bantamweight	Pilling (ENG); L ^{VT}	Turnbull (SCO); L points	did not advance		=5

== See also ==
- Ceylon at the 1960 Summer Olympics
- Ceylon at the 1964 Summer Olympics
