= Sri Lanka at the 2002 Commonwealth Games =

- CGF code: SRI
- CGA: National Olympic Committee of Sri Lanka
- Website: srilankaolympic.org

in Manchester, England
- Competitors: 31 male, 25 female
- Medals Ranked 27th: Gold 0 Silver 0 Bronze 0 Total 0

Commonwealth Games appearances (overview)
- 1938; 1950; 1954; 1958; 1962; 1966; 1970; 1974; 1978; 1982; 1986; 1990; 1994; 1998; 2002; 2006; 2010; 2014; 2018; 2022; 2026; 2030

Sri Lanka arrived in Manchester for their twelfth Commonwealth Games, bringing a total of 31 male and 25 female athletes competing in athletics, badminton, boxing, netball, rugby sevens, shooting squash, swimming and weightlifting. This large team failed to win any medals, a disappointment compared to the previous two games and the following one in Melbourne.

	Gold	Silver	Bronze	Total
Sri Lanka	0	0	0	0

== Netball ==
Sri Lanka finished 8th in the netball at the 2002 Commonwealth Games. They lost to Fiji 80–42 in the 7th/8th playoff match.

Pool A

26 July 2002	Wales	48–47	Sri Lanka
15:00	Mair Jones 31; Jamilla Harris 13	Report	Sashika Samarasinghe 28; Gishanthi Jayakody 19

27 July 2002	England	75–34	Sri Lanka
18:30	Alex Astle 31/41 (76%); Jess Garland 25; Joanne Steed 19	Report	Sashika Samarasinghe 13; Prasadi Nalika 12; Gishanthi Jayakody 8 Anoma Sriyakanthi 1

28 July 2002	New Zealand	116–26	Sri Lanka
13:00	Irene van Dyk 58/61 (95%); Donna Loffhagen 23; Belinda Colling 21; Daneka Wipiiti 14	Report	Prasadi Nalika 14; Sashika Samarasinghe 6 Gishanthi Jayakody 6

30 July 2002	Canada	52–49	Sri Lanka
15:00	Dulcina Wind 30; Maralyn Hope 22	Report	Sashika Samarasinghe 26 ? Gishanthi Jayakody 12; Prasadi Nalika 10

Table

Pos	Team	P	W	D	L	GF	GA	GD	Pts
1	New Zealand	4	4	0	0	365	101	+264	8
2	England	4	3	0	1	278	145	+133	6
3	Wales	4	2	0	2	138	251	-113	4
4	Canada	4	1	0	3	137	286	-149	2
5	Sri Lanka	4	0	0	4	156	291	-135	0

Qualified for Major semi-finals
Qualified for Minor Semi-finals
Qualified for 7th/10th classification

7th/10th classification

31 July 2002	Sri Lanka	41–40	Barbados
13:00	Sashika Samarasinghe 22; Gishanthi Jayakody 19		Olivia Walcott 13; Cheryl Squires 11; Denise Alleyne 11 ? Harris 5

7th/8th playoff

2 August 2002	Fiji	80–42	Sri Lanka
13:00	Paulini Tora 25; Taraima Rara 22; Matelita Shaw 22; Maria Bereso 11	Report	Sashika Samarasinghe 24/31 (77%); Gishanthi Jayakody 15; Prasadi Nalika 3

Squad

Sri Lanka roster
Players
Coaches

Name	Pos	DOB	Height	Club	Nat	Caps
Thushari Dissanayake			–
Gishanthi Jayakody	GS, GA		–
Sandhya Jayasuriya			–
Damayanthi Jayathilaka			–
Arunika Karawitage			–
Anjana Kulari			–
Gayathri Lankatilleke	WD		–
Dammika Malkanthi			–
Prasadi Nalika	GS, GA		–
Sashika Samarasinghe	GS, GA		–
Anoma Sriyakanthi			–
Harshanie Wijayalath	GD		–

Head coach

- ??

Notes

- (c) – Captain
- (cc) – Co-captain
- (vc) – Vice-captain
- – Injury / maternity leave
- (TRP) – Temporary Replacement Player
