= Sriyanath Karalliyadde =

Judge of the Court of Appeal of Sri Lanka (died 2025)

The Honourable Sriyanath Karalliyadde

Judge of the Court of Appeal of Sri Lanka
- In office 1 December 2020 – 12 November 2025
- Appointed by: Gotabaya Rajapaksa

Personal details
- Born: Sriyanath Udaya Bandara Karalliyadde
- Died: 12 November 2025
- Spouse: Thusitha Pussedeniya
- Education: Sri Lanka Law College; St. Sylvester's College

Sriyanath Udaya Bandara Karalliyadde (died 12 November 2025) was a Sri Lankan lawyer who served as a judge of the Court of Appeal of Sri Lanka. He was appointed by President Gotabaya Rajapaksa and served from 1 December 2020 until his death on 12 November 2025.

== Early life ==
Karalliyadde was an alumnus of St. Sylvester's College and Sri Lanka Law College.

== Career ==
Karalliyadde previously served as a judge in Sri Lanka's Magistrate's Court, District Court and High Court.

He was appointed a judge of the Court of Appeal of Sri Lanka on 1 December 2020 by President Gotabaya Rajapaksa.

== Death ==
Karalliyadde died on 12 November 2025.
