= Senaka Dissanayake =

Sri Lankan cricketer (born 1965)

Senaka Dissanayake සේනක දිසානායක
Personal information
- Born: 21 June 1965 (age 61); Kandy, Sri Lanka
- Source: Cricinfo, 10 February 2016

Senaka Dissanayake (born 21 June 1965) is a Sri Lankan former first-class cricketer who played for Burgher Recreation Club and Kandy Cricket Club.
