= Vidyartha College =

School in Kandy, Sri Lanka

- විද්‍යාර්ථ විද්‍යාලය வித்தியார்த்த கல்லூரி

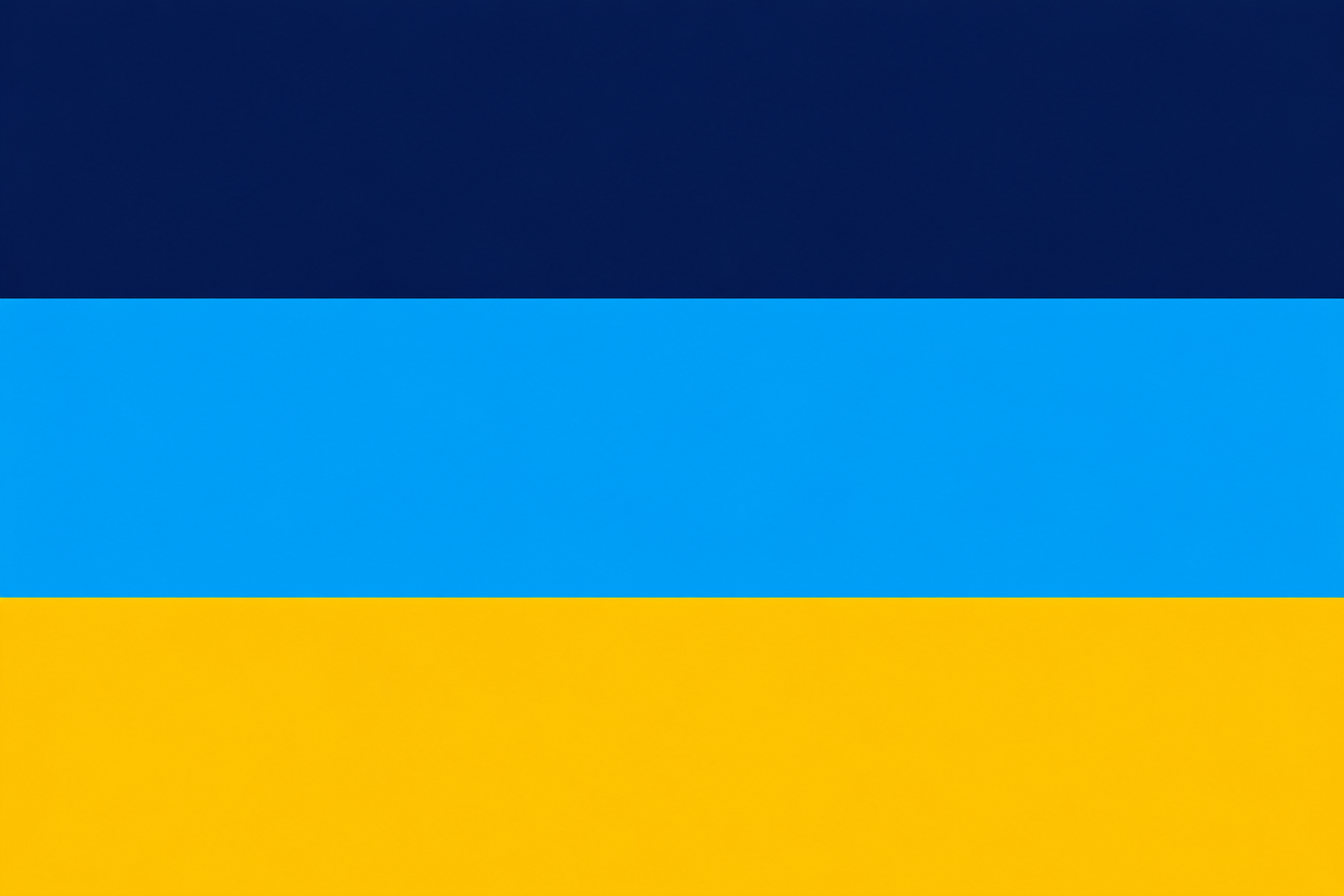
- Flag of Vidyartha College

Location
- Katugastota Road; Kandy, Central Province; Sri Lanka; 7°18′21″N 80°38′09″E

Information
- Former name: King's College
- Type: National Government School -1AB
- Motto: "විද්‍යා සර්වස්‍ය භුෂණම්"; Education is the Best Jewelry
- Religious affiliation: Buddhism
- Established: 18 May 1942 (84 years ago)
- Founder: Vidyartha Society
- Sister school: Pushpadana Girls' College
- School district: Kandy
- Educational authority: Ministry of Education
- School code: 03381
- Principal: Sugath Srilal
- Chaplain: Nugagolle Uparathana
- Teaching staff: 180+
- Grades: 1 – 13
- Gender: Male
- Age: 5 to 19
- Enrollment: 4000+
- Education system: National Education System
- Language: Sinhalese from Grade 1 to A/Ls, English from Grade 6 to A/Ls (currently available only for maths stream)
- Hours in school day: 07:30–13:30 SLST
- Colors: Navy, aqua and gold
- Song: Sinhala :"දේශප්‍රේමී අභිමාන සුපූජිත වීර සිසුන් බිහිවේවා" "Dēsha prēmi abhimāna supūjitha vīra sisun bihiwēwā"
- Athletics: Yes
- Sports: Yes
- Nickname: Tigers
- Rival: St. Sylvester's College
- Affiliation: Vidyartha Society (1942)
- Abbreviation: VCK
- Pupils: Brave sons of Vidyartha
- Website: vidyartha.lk
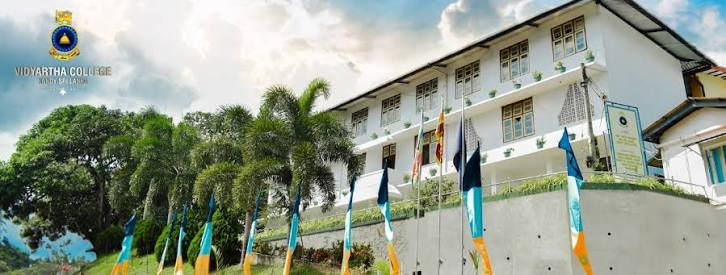

Vidyartha College (Sinhala:විද්‍යාර්ථ විද්‍යාලය) (Tamil:வித்தியார்த்த கல்லூரி) is an all-male national school located in the Central Province of Sri Lanka. The college was founded in 1942 by the Vidyartha Society, and is currently run by the Government of Sri Lanka. The college has two sections: the primary section which includes grades 1–5; and the secondary section which includes students in grades 6–13.

== History ==
Although there were many educational opportunities for Buddhist children in the Central Province during the early 1900s, there was a lack of education in English. This deficiency led Sir Tikiri Bandara Panabokke to create the Vidyartha Society in 1939. Other contributors to this project were T. B. Panabokke, M. B. Panabokke, S. L. Ratwatte, A. C. L. Ratwatte, William Gopallawa (President of Sri Lanka), T. B. Ranaraja, A. B. Pinnawala, K. B. Wijekoon, R. Divithotawela, A. Rathnayake, G. D. A. Abeyrathne (1st principal of the school), Dr. L. B. Senevirathne, L. M. Koswatta, M. B. E. Senevirathne and M. B. Kulugammana. The Society eventually purchased a private school named King's College, which was located on a rise on Katugasthota Road. Later, the name was changed to Vidyartha College. The new college had forty students and six teachers, and the first principal was G. D. A. Abeyratne. On 1 August 1961, the government took control of the college and still maintains control today.

== Development ==
Vidyartha College quickly grew in popularity, with a hostel and main hall were added so that the college could accept more students; children in rural areas such as Anuradhapura, Polonnaruwa, Ampara, Monaragala being now able to attend Vidyartha.

In 1954, an Advanced Level of Examination was held at Vidyartha for the first time. The college has since added three programs: science in 1958, commerce in 1972, and information technology in 1994. Necessary steps were being taken to build up an English Medium A/L Section by the former principal, M. R. P. Mayadunne. A notable achievement was made under the patronage of the current principal Sugath Srilal as the english A/Ls for mathematics initiated in 2026.

A Colombo branch was formed in 1987 by C. K. Gajanayake, who was its first president. Major-General H. M. N. Krishnaratne is the incumbent president of the Colombo branch and Ranjith Weeerasinghe functions as the honorary secretary.

When the college was first established, it only had a few buildings, a principal, and eight teachers. Today, there are 2,900 students receiving their education in the college, with a teaching staff of more than 180.

Kandy District

== Principals ==
Principals of Vidyartha College: 1942–present
Portrait	Name	Start	End	Notes
	G. D. A. Abeyrathne	1942	1948	First principal of Vidyartha College
	M. B. W. Mediwake	1948	1955	Served as the Minister of Local Government and Housing, Member of Parliament and Member of Senate of Ceylon.
	A. Athauda	1955	1967	
	D. B. Dissanayake	1967	1968	
	P. B. Rasingolla	1968	1971	
	T. B. Karunarathne	1971	1974	
	M. B. Pethiyagoda	1974	1977	
	P. M. L. Banda	1983	1986	
	T. B. Damunupola	1987	1991	
	S. S. C. Wijesinghe	1991	1992	
	W. M. Bandaranayake	1992	1995	
	W. B. Gunnepana	1995	2006	Specialist Trained in Science
	P. A. S. Alwis	2006	2013	
	D. M. A. Disanayake	2013	2015	
	R. U. K. Rajapaksha	2015	2018	
	M. R. P. Mayadunne	2018	2025	
	D. M. Senarathne	2025	2026	acting principal
	Sugath Srilal	2026	present	

== Vidyartha Old Boys Association ==
Vidyartha Old Boys Association is a supporting body for the college; its members work to improve the college's qualities and standards, as well as its reputation. The first president of the College OBA is Loku Banda Aluvihare.

== Clubs ==
=== Science Society ===
The Science Society is one of the most prominent academic organisations at the school. Dedicated to fostering scientific curiosity, critical thinking, and innovation, the society serves as a platform for young minds to bridge textbook knowledge with practical application.

The society helps prepare students for Advanced Level (A/L) examinations and future careers in medicine, engineering, research, and technology, carrying forward Vidyartha College’s tradition of academic excellence.

=== Technology Society ===
The Technology Society is dedicated to fostering a community of passionate learners, creators, and innovators. They believe that technology is the ultimate tool for solving real-world problems.

Through hands-on workshops, collaborative projects, and engaging competitions, we aim to bridge the gap between theoretical knowledge and practical application, preparing their members for the digital future. Visit their official website .

== Alumni ==
- Jason Dissanayake – Sri Lankan rugby sevens player; represented Sri Lanka at the 2018 Asian Games
- Kosala Kulasekara – Sri Lankan cricketer and all-rounder; represented Sri Lanka in Test and ODI cricket (2011–2012)
- Roshan Ranasinghe – Politician, former Minister of Sports and Youth Affairs and Minister of Irrigation; Member of Parliament for Polonnaruwa District (2010–2024)
- Thiwanka Ranasinghe – Light flyweight boxer, 2018 Commonwealth Games bronze medallist
- C. B. Rathnayake - Member of parliament, Nuwara Eliya (1994–2000, 2001–2024)
- Loku Banda Aluvihare - Mayor of Kandy (2006-2010), inaugural president of the Old Boys' Association (2007-2011)
- Manju Wanniarachchi – Sri Lankan boxer, 2010 Commonwealth Games bantamweight gold medallist (later stripped)
- Susith Weerasekara – Rear Admiral, Deputy Chief of Staff of the Sri Lanka Navy (2009–2011)
- Nalin Wijesinghe – Sri Lankan rugby player and coach; former Vidyartha College captain and coach

== College houses ==
The college houses are:

- Parackrama : Blue
- Wickrama : Red
- Mahinda : Yellow
- Narendra : Light blue

== Annual Big Match ==
Battle of the Babes is played annually between St. Sylvester's College and Vidyartha since 1958 except for 3 years. As of 2025, 65 matches have been played and, Vidyartha College has won 3 matches while, 46 matches were drawn. Vidyartha College last won in 1967.
