= Battle of the Maroons (Colombo) =

Sri Lankan collegiate cricket series

- Logo used since 2024
- Native name: සුලෝහිත සංග්‍රාමය
- Other names: Ananda-Nalanda Cricket Encounter
- Sport: Cricket
- Type: Test Match; One-Day
- Location: Colombo
- Teams: Ananda College; Nalanda College
- First meeting: 1924
- Latest meeting: 2025
- Next meeting: 2026
- Broadcasters: ThePapare, Dialog TV
- Stadiums: Sinhalese Sports Club Cricket Ground
- Trophy: Dr. N. M. Perera Memorial Trophy (Test); P de S Kularatne Trophy (One-Day)

Statistics
- Total meetings: 95
- Most wins: Ananda College (12 wins)

Results
- 95th Battle of the Maroons - Match Drawn; 48th limited overs encounter - Match Abandoned

The Battle of the Maroons (also known as Ananda-Nalanda Cricket Encounter, Sinhala: ආනන්ද-නාලන්දා සුලෝහිත සංග්‍රාමය) is an annual big match played between Ananda College, Colombo and Nalanda College, Colombo, since 1924.

== History ==
The first Battle of the Maroons was played in 1924, where the Nalanda College playing team was led by B. S. Perera while K. A. P. Rajakaruna led the Anandians, which was subsequently abandoned due to heavy rain. Nalanda won the next match held in 1925, led by B. S. Perera again, while Ananda was led by N. M. Perera. Since then, the match has been held every year, excluding 1943, 1944, and 1945 during the World War II and 1948.

Previously a two-day test format, the match is now played as a three-day format since the 2025 edition, accompanied by a one-day limited overs match. The match is predominantly held at the Singhalese Sports Club grounds. Nalanda are the current holders of the trophy, having won it in 2022 under the captaincy of Dineth Samaraweera. The recent 95th encounter ended in a draw while the 48th one-day encounter was abandoned due to rain.

Sri Lanka's first Test cricket captain, the late Bandula Warnapura, was an alumnus of Nalanda College, while Arjuna Ranatunga, who captained the Sri Lankan Cricket Team in the World Cup victory in 1996, is an alumnus of Ananda College, both having played in the Battle of the Maroons in their respective college teams. In 1951, Stanley Jayasinghe became the first Nalandian to represent All Ceylon Cricket Team while still being a schoolboy playing against Pakistan in Pakistan

== Trophy ==
The match is contested for the Dr. N. M. Perera Memorial Trophy. The one day 50 overs match is played for P de S Kularatne trophy.

== Results of the last Big Match in 2025 ==
95th three-day match

28 March–2 April 25

Ananda College, Colombo	v	Nalanda College, Colombo
324/6 d (92.2 overs); Dinada Athalage 131; Kenul de Zoysa 73; Punsara Rajakarauna 2/69; Osanda Pamuditha 2/80		325/6 d (88.4 overs); Nadul Jayalath 111; Nemindu Akmeemana 43; Sadew Samarasinghe 40; Sharada Jayarathna 4/58
27/1 (7 overs)

Match drawn
SSC Grounds, Colombo

- Nalanda won the toss and elected to field

48th limited overs match

16 March 2025

Ananda College, Colombo; 249 for 9 (50 overs)	v	Nalanda College, Colombo; 62/2 (12.2 overs)
Kenul de Zoysa 39; Nethula Edirimanne 34; Hasith Ratnayake 4/46; Sadew Samarasinghe 2/41		Lithum Wijekumara 29 n.o

Abandoned due to rain
SSC Grounds, Colombo

- Nalanda won the toss and elected to field.
