= Battle of the Maroons (Kandy) =

Annual school cricket competition between Dharmaraja and Kingswood

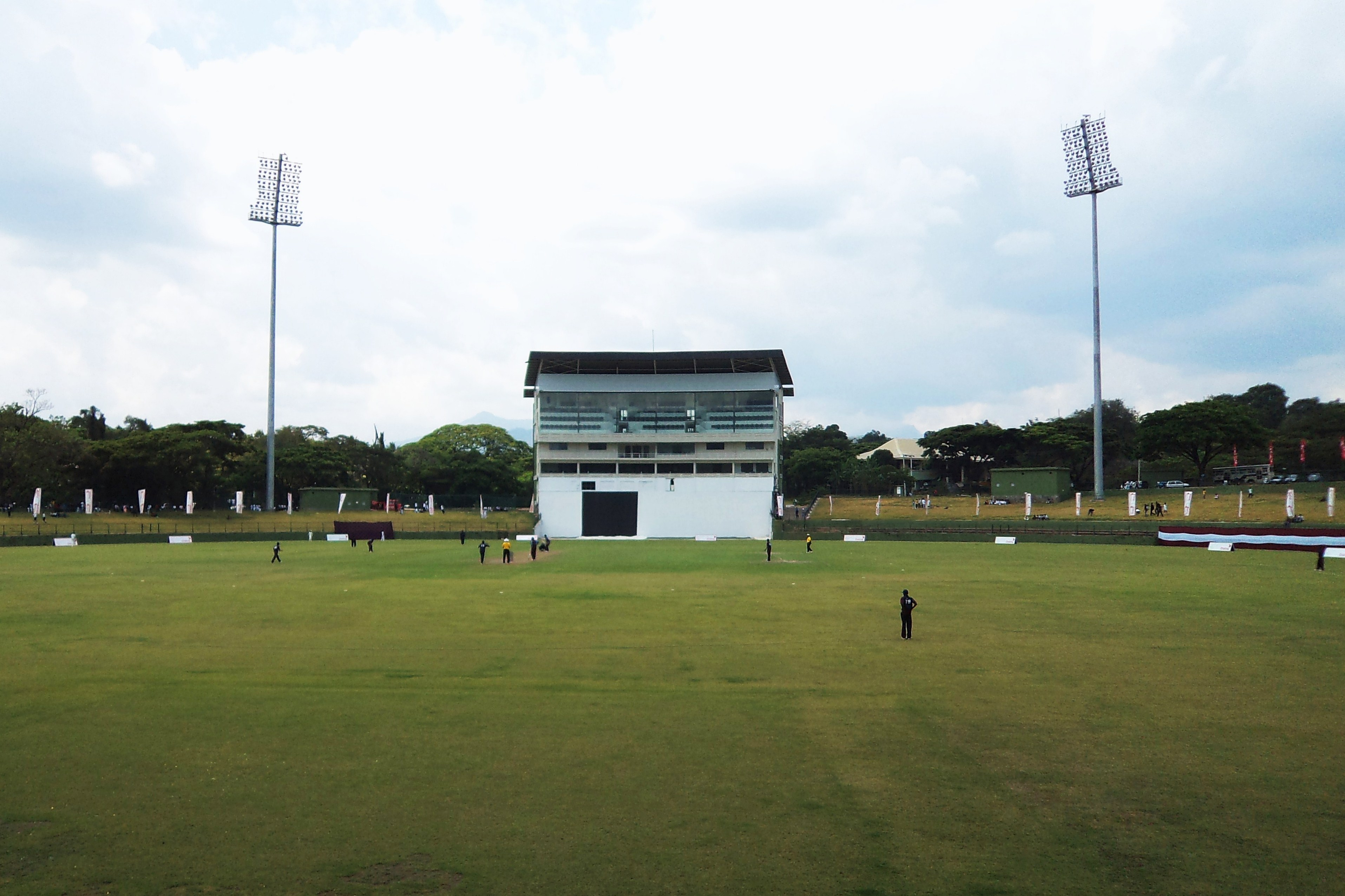
- During the 106th Battle of Maroons encounter

- Dharmaraja College Kingswood College
- Other names: Hill Capital Battle of the Maroons; Kingswood–Dharmaraja Cricket Encounter; Battle of T. B. Tennekoon Memorial Trophy
- Sport: Cricket
- Type: Test Match; One-Day
- Location: Kandy
- First meeting: 1893
- Latest meeting: 2026
- Next meeting: 2027
- Broadcasters: ThePapare, Dialog TV
- Stadiums: Pallekele International Cricket Stadium; Asgiriya Stadium
- Trophy: T. B. Tennekoon Memorial Trophy Winston Hooles Trophy

Statistics
- Total meetings: 119
- Most wins: Dharmaraja College (37 wins)
- Top scorer: Kavija Gamage - Kingswood College (212 Runs)

Results
- 119th Battle of the Maroons - Kingswood College; 37th limited overs encounter - Dharmaraja College

Battle of the Maroons is the annual cricket match between two of the largest government-run national boys' schools in Kandy, Sri Lanka: Dharmaraja College, Kandy and Kingswood College, Kandy. It is the oldest cricket match series in the central province and second oldest in Sri Lanka, having been played for 133 years.

== History ==
The first match was played in 1893, with the Dharmaraja team captained by Don Baron Jayatilaka, then-incumbent principal of Dharmaraja College, and the Kingswood team captained by A. E. Spencer. It was played at the Bogambara Stadium, which is no longer a cricket venue. This match, along with a few subsequent matches, were not exclusively schoolboy matches, with staff members from each school included in the teams. The first all-schoolboy Big Match was played in 1899, with J. C. de Mel captaining Dharmaraja and T. B. Marshall captaining Kingswood. All big matches were played at the Asgiriya Stadium until 2010, and since 2011, the Pallekele International Cricket Stadium was also used as a venue for the big match.

The One Day Encounter between Dharmaraja College, Kandy and Kingswood College, Kandy began in the year 1989 with Prasanna Dahanayake as the captain of Dharmaraja College.

The 118th encounter took place as a three-day match from 4 to 6 April 2025 at Pallekele International Cricket Stadium. This marked the first time in its history that the encounter was held over three days.

Location Map
1 Kingswood College, Kandy
2 Dharmaraja College
3 Pallekele International Cricket Stadium
4 Asgiriya Stadium

== Series summary ==
Currently, Dharmaraja leads with 37 wins against 20 by Kingswood, with 62 matches ending in a draw. All the matches from 1981 to 2010 ended in a draw. Kingswood's last win was in 2026 under the captaincy of Nikeshala Nanayakkara, in which Kingswood secured a 148 run victory, at the Asgiriya international cricket stadium. On the 23rd of March 2024, Dharmaraja College secured victory under the captaincy of Dulara Bandulasena at the Pallekale International Cricket Stadium. The latest 119th Battle of the Maroons was played at the Asgiriya International Cricket Stadium and Kingswood College won the match.

== Highlights ==
- 1893 - The first encounter which included staff members and school boy's played at Bogambara grounds. Dharmaraja was led by a member of the staff, Don Baron Jayathilake, later Don Baron Jayathilake. Kingswood was led by Spencer.
- 1899 – The inaugural Kingswood vs Dharmaraja match for schoolboys only was played on 1 July. Kingswood was captained by T. B. Marshall.
- 1914 – A. Jayasundera took 8 wickets for 90 runs as Dharmaraja beat Kingswood by innings and 17 runs.
- 1916 – R. Burke took 8 wickets for 7 runs as Kingswood beat Dharmaraja by innings and 24 runs.
- 1918 – Dharmaraja were out for 190 runs by Kingswood.
- 1943 – First century in the series, scored by R. L. Arthur Alwis of Dharmaraja College. The Rajan's skipper, T. B. Talwatte, was deprived of this honour as he was injured by the Kingswood pace bowler, M. T. Jaimon and Talwatte had to leave the field temporarily during which time Arthur completed his century. Later, Talwatte too completed his century. M. T. Jaimon took 5 wickets for 90 runs for Kingswood. The match was won by the Rajans by innings and 152 runs. J. P. Jayasena captained Kingswood.
- 1951 – Kingswood led by the left-hander Shelton R. S. Perera, scored an exciting win over Dharmaraja, having had to score ten runs in six balls and one run in two balls, which they did with a ball to spare. The winning stroke was hit by the captain himself.
- 1952 – Chandra de Silva scored 158 for Dharmaraja in this match, played at Randles Hill. Asoka Perera scored 148 for Kingswood. The match ended in a draw. De Silva's 158 was the highest individual score in the series.
- 1956 – The highlight of the drawn encounter was the bowling feat of M. Nizar of Kingswood who took 6 wickets for 48 runs.
- 1957 – Kingswood amassed 401 for 9 wickets with Maurice Fernando scoring 101 runs. Dharmaraja replied with 269 runs in the first innings.
- 1958 – Kingswood defeated Dharmaraja by 10 wickets. In this match, Kingwood was captained by C. M. Fernando who was selected "The School Boy Cricketer of the Year". Dharmaraja was captained by D. D. T. Alwis. The Kingswood opening pair, considered the best among schools, was Maurice Fernando and Herly Jayasuriya. They put on an unbroken stand of 102 runs in the second innings enabling Kingswood to win. Herly scored a brisk 50 while Maurice scored 43 runs.
- 1959 – C. Ratnavibushana scored 167 for Kingswood, surpassing the earlier record of 158 as the highest individual score.
- 1960 – The match ended in a tie but Kingswood's principal, K. M. de Lanerolle, awarded the game to Dharmaraja having gone through the scorebook for better performance.
- 1964 – The match was postponed due to rain. In the rescheduled game the Rajans were two runs short of victory when the stumps were drawn.
- 1965 – The Jayasundera twins, Ananda and Upananda, played for Dharmaraja. Earlier Kingswood had twins.
- 1967 – The Kingswood skipper Tissa Jayathilake batting well with Mohan Kodituwakku, declared the innings still short of 9 runs of a century, which would have earned him the distinction of scoring consecutive centuries having scored an unbeaten 100 in the 1966 match. Another feature of this match was the bowling of the left-arm spinner Sena Abeygunaratne, who took 8 wickets for 39 runs in the Dharmaraja 1st innings of 143 runs.
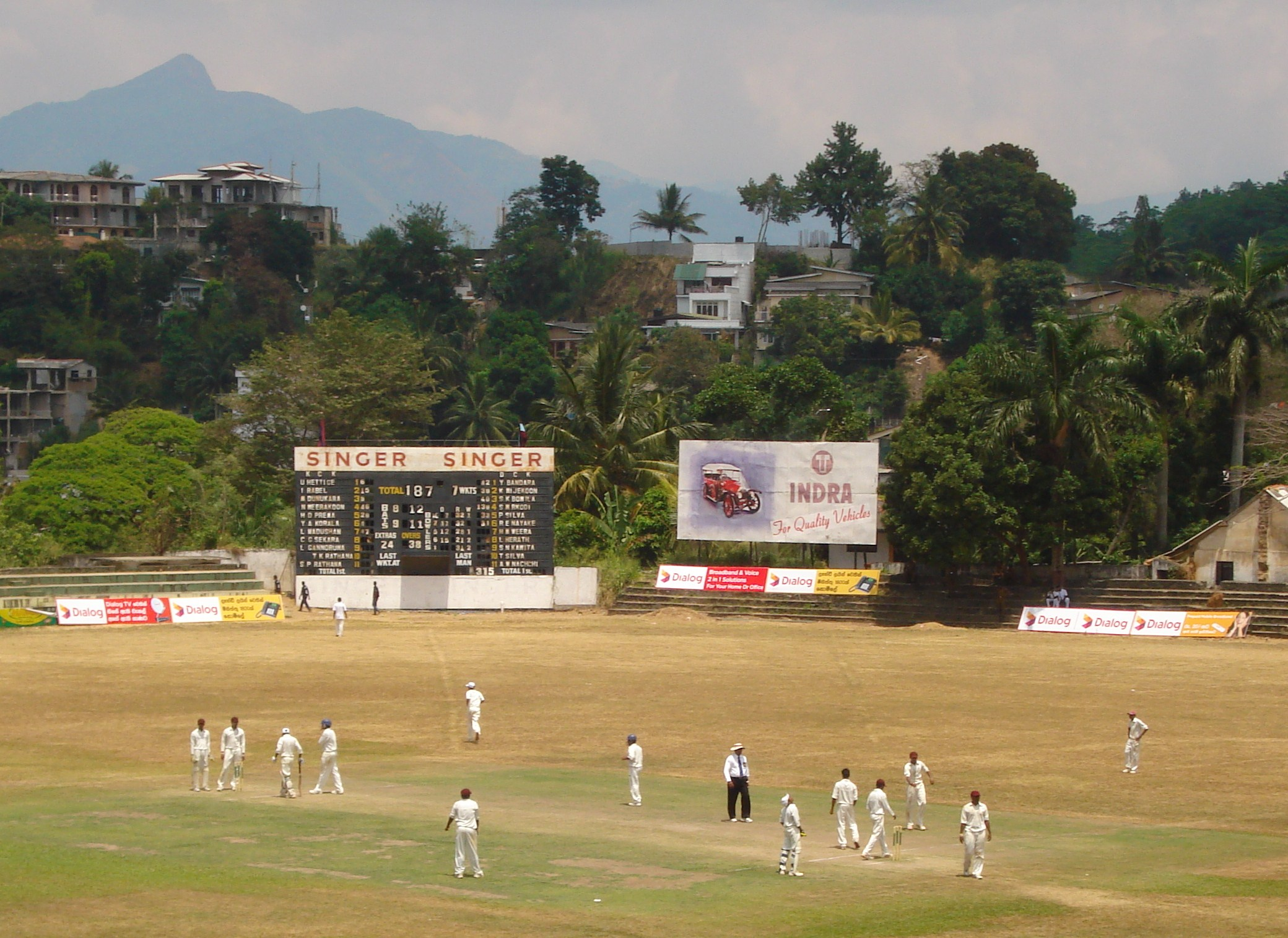
  104th Battle of Marrons encounter at Asgiriya Stadium
- 1976 & 1977 – P. B. Wickremasuriya of Kingswood and Ajith Naranpanawe of Dharmaraja entered the record books by scoring centuries in both years thus becoming the only two players to score centuries in consecutive matches.
- 1981 – Cricket Captain of Dharmaraja College Janaka Mendis registered an outright win over Kingswood College. Since then for 30 years there was no decision.
- 1983 – Senaka Dissanayake scored a double century for Dharmaraja, the only double century in the series, which stands as the highest individual score for the series until 2025.
- 2001 – First one-day match played in colour outfits which Dharmaraja won under Anuradha Jayasundara.
- 2011 – First match played in Pallekele International Cricket Stadium and the first school cricket match to be played at that stadium. Dharmaraja College won by 7 wickets under the captaincy of Hemal Munaweera putting an end to the 30 years of draws.
- 2012 – Dharmaraja College won the 106th Battle of the Maroons by 7 wickets under the captaincy of Viraj Karaputugala.
- 2013 – The 107th Battle of the Maroons encounter was held on 22 and 23 March 2013 at the Asgiriya International Stadium. The limited-over match played on 30 March 2013 at the same venue.
- 2017 - The 111th Battle of the Maroons encounter was held on 17 and 18 March 2017 at the Pallekele International Cricket Stadium. Kingswood was led by Avishla Chandrasiri and Dharmaraja was led by Deshan Gunasinghe.
- 2018 - The 112th Battle of the Maroons encounter was held on 16 and 17 March 2018 at the Pallekele International Cricket Stadium.
- 2019 - The 113th Battle of the Maroons encounter was held on 15 and 16 March 2019 at the Pallekele International Cricket Stadium and the match was draw.
- 2022 - The 114th Battle of the Maroons encounter was held on 11–12 March 2022 at the Pallekele International Cricket Stadium and the match was draw. The limited-over match played on 23 March 2022 at the same venue and Dharmaraja College won the match.
- 2022 - The 115th Battle of the Maroons encounter was held on 22 and 23 September 2022 at the Asgiriya International Stadium and the match was draw. The limited-over match played on 2 October 2022 at the Pallekele International Cricket Stadium and the match was a draw.
- 2023 - The 116th Battle of the Maroons encounter was held on 24 and 25 March 2023 at the Pallekele International Cricket Stadium and the match draw. The limited-over match played on the 9th of April 2023 at the same venue and Dharmaraja College won the match by 50 runs.
- 2024 -
1. The 117th Battle of the Maroons encounter was held on 22 and 23 March 2024 at the Pallekele International Cricket Stadium and Dharmaraja College won the match under the captain of Dulara Bandulasena. Opening Batsmen of Dharmaraja College Pulindu Perera scores 92 and Pulindu Perera (92) with Onajith De Silva (60) build a partnership for 152 points in the first inning of the match. 2nd day Kingswood lost the first wicket with only scoring 10 points. But with the help of Kavija Gamage and Yosath Abekon Kingswood scored 178/10 in the 1st inning. But with Dakshika Manukalpa"s in the 2nd inning of the match Kingswood only scored 78/10. Dakshika Manukalpa took 8 wickets for 30 runs as the Dharmaraja won the match by an inning and 69 runs.
2. The 35th limited-over match was held on the 31st of March 2024 at the Pallekele International Cricket Stadium and Kingswood College won the match. Vice captain of Kingswood College Kavija Gamage top scored with a 102 with 13 fours and 1 six. Rajans bowlers, Pakshika Manukapa got 3 wickets for 38 and Arosha Mahagedera 2 wickets for 8. Thanks to Kingswood bowlers and keepers Kingswood manage to win the one day encounter by 9 runs.
- 2025 -
1. The 118th Battle of the Maroons encounter was held on 4th, 5th and 6 April 2025 at the Pallekele International Cricket Stadium and the match was draw. Both Tharindu Warnakulage and Lakvin Abeysinghe scored unbeaten 203* runs each for Dharmaraja College which remains as joint highest scores in the Battle of Maroons history.
2. The 36th limited-over match was held on the 19th of April 2025 at the Pallekele International Cricket Stadium and Dharmaraja College won the match.
- 2026 -
  1. The 119th Battle of the Maroons encounter was held on 20th, 21st and 22 March 2026 at the Asgiriya International Stadium and Kingswood College won the match after a 68 year title drought under the captaincy of Nikeshala Nanayakkara.
  2. The 37th limited-over match was held on the 05th of April 2026 at the Pallekele International Cricket Stadium and Dharmaraja College won the match by 83 runs.

== Overall result ==
As of 5th April 2026

Teams	Battle of the Maroons			Current Trophy Holder	
Teams	Total Win	Total Lost	Total Draw	T. B. Tennekoon Memorial Trophy	Winston Hooles Trophy
Dharmaraja College	37	20	62	Kingswood College (2026)	Dharmaraja College (2026)
Kingswood College	20	37	62	Kingswood College (2026)	Dharmaraja College (2026)

== Results of the 2026 encounters ==
119th three-day encounter

20–22 March 2026

Kingswood	v	Dharmaraja
226 (74.5 overs); Kavija Gamage 112; Kenula Pihiliyanga 5/42; Kavija Gamage 4/70		160 (66.2 overs); Mandil Gunawardena 59; Shashitha Bandara 46; Shashitha Bandara 5/80
248/4d (55.3 overs); Kavija Gamage 100*; Kenula Pihiliyanga 6/54; Kavija Gamage 4/70		166 (72.3 overs); Kavindu Gunaratne 42; Omesh Ekanayake 34; Isuru Samarathunga 3/82

Kingswood won by 148 runs
Asgiriya Stadium

- Dharmaraja won the toss and elected to field.

37th limited-overs encounter

05 April 2026

Dharmaraja; 195 (49.3 overs)	v	Kingswood; 112 (33.1 overs)
Omesh Ekanayake 47(73); Gavesh Poorna 47(75); Shashith Bandara 5/24		Kenula Pihilianga 31(37); Manula Wijethunga 23(51); Kavija Gamage 4/36

Dharmaraja won by 83 runs
Pallekele International Cricket Stadium

- Kingswood won the toss and elected to field.

== Squads for the 2026 encounter ==
Squads of DRCK and KCK 2026
Year	Team	Captain	Vice Captain	Wicket Keeper	Players	Head coach
Year	DRCK & KCK	Captain	Vice Captain	Wicket Keeper	Players	Head coach
2026 (119th & 37th)	Dharmaraja College	Kavindu Gunaratne	Tharindu Warnakulage	-	Kavindu Gunaratne (Captain), Tharindu Warnakulage (V.Captain), Kashyapa Dissanayake, Sumeda Prasad, Omesh Ekanayake, Keshana Gunawardane, Gavesh Poorna, Jayodya Kadiga, Malisha Gunasekara, Chanuka Lakshan, Chanuth Jayasinghearachchi, Mandil Gunawardane, Shashith Bandara, Methsilu Bandara, Thevindu Herath, Onitha Vithanage, Isuru Samarathunga, Lahiru Nilwakke, Dineth Abeyrathne and Thinulaka Rajapakse.	Senaka Dissanayake
2026 (119th & 37th)	Kingswood College	Nikeshala Nanayakkara	Aadhil Sherif	-	Nikeshala Nanayakkara (Captain), Aadhil Sherif (V.Captain), Kavija Gamage, Kenula Pihilianga, Yosath Abeykoon, Chanul Kodituwakku, Manula Wijethunga, Nadeesha Bandaranayake, Pamuditha Bandara, Eshan Ayodhya, Dominsara Pieris, Umantha Kithsiri, Dinidu Sayuranga, Saniru Dahanayake, Kanishka Dahanayake, Thushan Bandara, Gamindu Wickramasinghe, Adeesha Nimnada, Jananu Rodrigo and Movindu Senanayake.	Susantha Rajapaksa

Above squads are according to the 119th Battle of Marrons encounter and 37th limited over encounter.

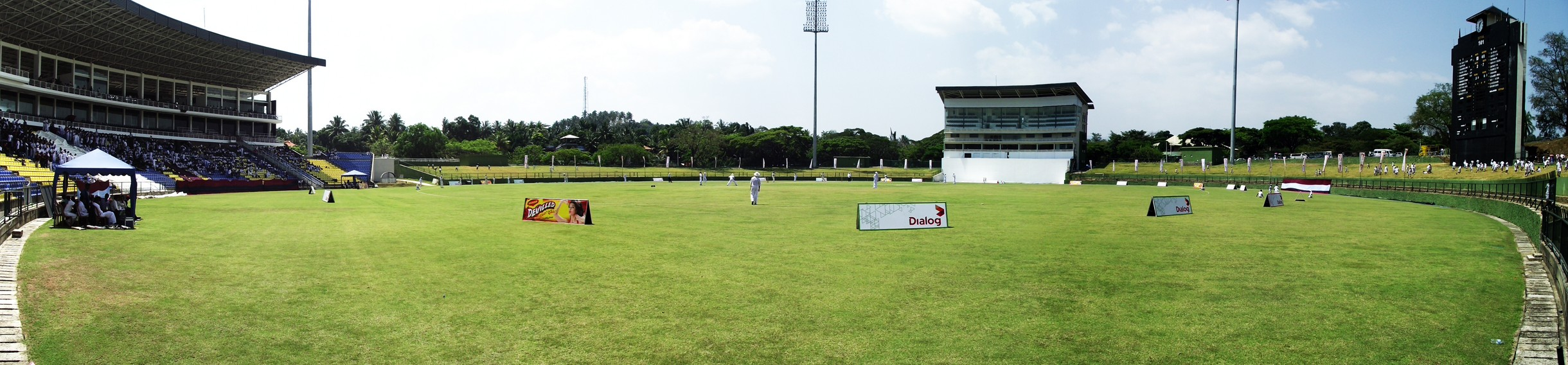
Panoramic view of the Pallekale International Cricket Stadium during the 106th Battle of Marrons encounter

== See also ==
- Dharmaraja College
- Kingswood College, Kandy
- List of Big Matches in Sri Lanka

== Notes ==
Match reports
