= Defence Services School, Colombo =

Defence Services College
- ආරක්ෂක සේවා විද්‍යාලය
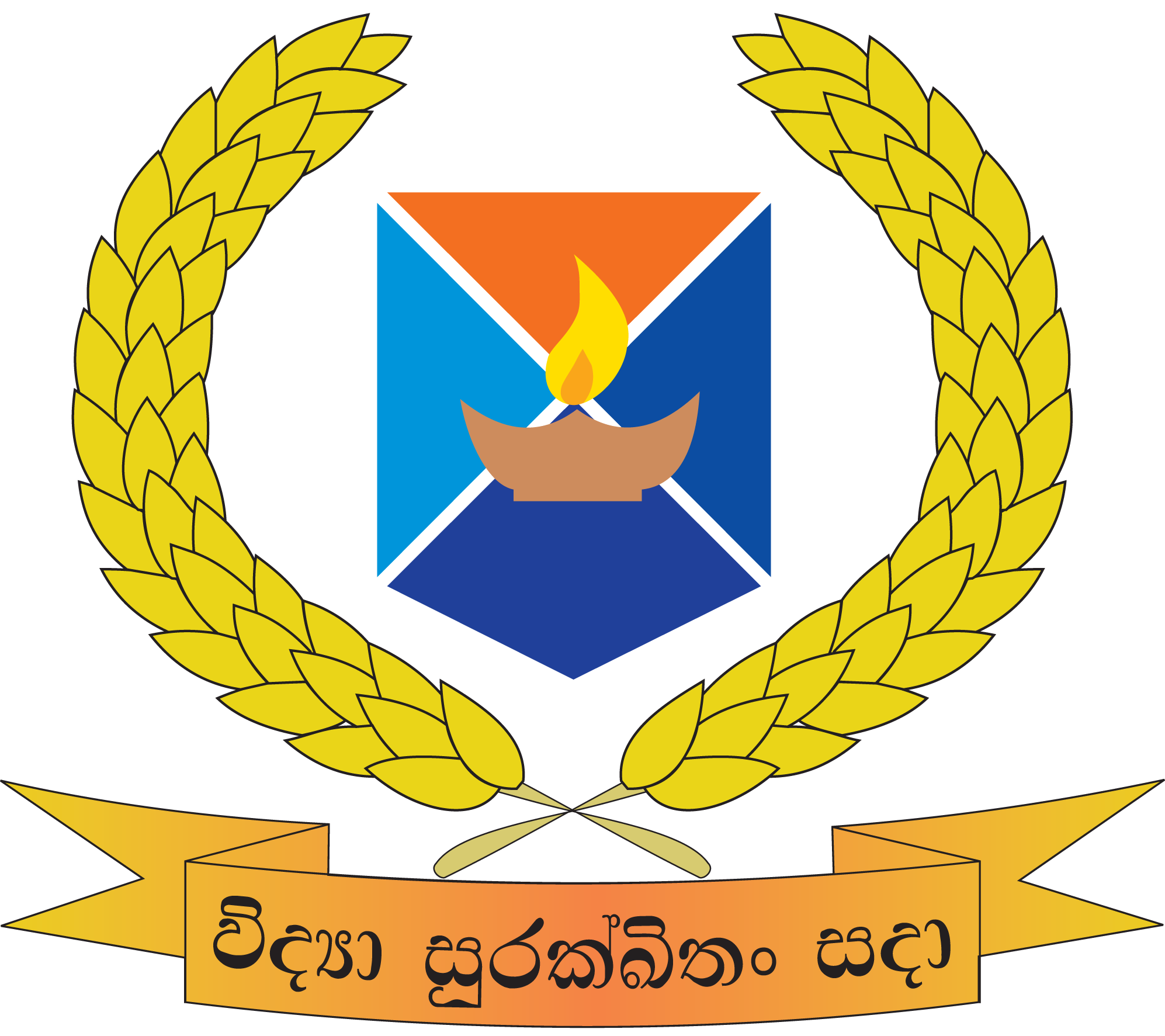

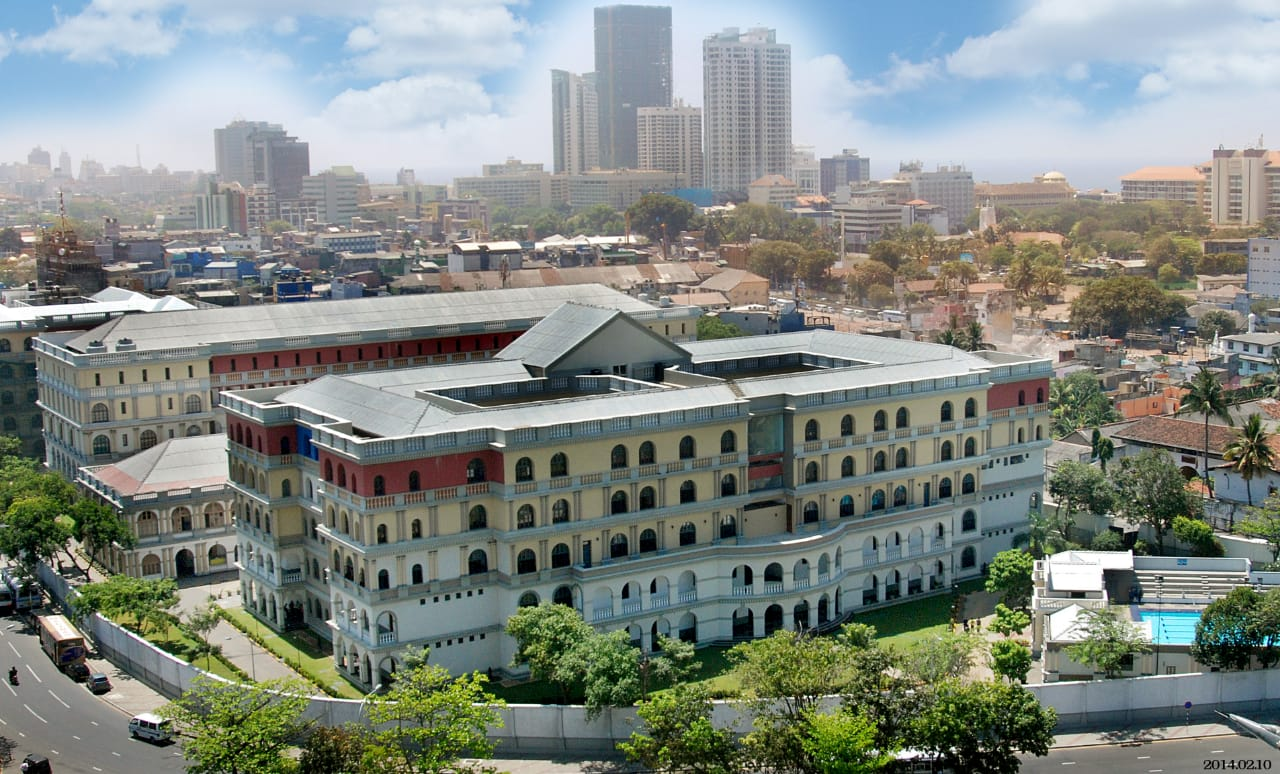
- No. 34, Malay Street, Colombo 02; Colombo; Sri Lanka

Information
- School type: National School National School
- Motto: Pali: විද්‍යා සුරක්ඛිතං සදා vidyā surakkhitaṁ sadā
- Established: 17 January 2007; 19 years ago
- Founder: Gotabaya Rajapakshe
- School district: Colombo
- Chairman: Air Vice Marshal Sampath Thuyacontha (Retd) (The Secretary to the Ministry of Defence serves as the Chairman of the Board of Management of Defence Services College)
- Director: Brigadier. Anil Priyadarshana
- Principal: Madhuka Desaman Fernando
- Teaching staff: 169
- Grades: 1-13
- Gender: Male and Female
- Age range: 6-19
- Language: Sinhala, English
- Area: 4.5 hectares
- Houses: Gagana, Derana, Sayura, Pawana
- Student Union/Association: Defence Services College Past Pupils Association
- Colors: Blue, orange, dark blue, light blue
- Song: "Apa Daru Dariyo"
- Affiliation: Military of Sri Lanka and Ministry Of Education
- Alumni: Defenciates
- Website: https://defencesc.lk/

Defence Services College was gifted to the nation in 2007 under the visionary guidance of former president Mahinda Rajapaksa and the then Secretary of Defence and Urban Development Gotabaya Rajapaksa, as an emblem of gratitude to the children of tri-forces and police war heroes.

Majestically sprawled across 4.5 hectares on Malay Street, Colombo 02, the college was primarily established to ease the challenges faced by tri-forces and police personnel regarding school admissions for their children.

The land where the school stands carries a rich historical legacy spanning over a century, reflecting architectural influences reminiscent of the Old Dutch structures in Galle. The earliest recorded building, erected in 1861, served as an office during the tenure of British Governor Sir Henry George Ward, and by 1891, the premises served as a military station under Major General Dunham Massy—a fact commemorated on a carved granite inscription discovered during reconstructions and still preserved within the school’s main building.

Over the decades, the grounds served multiple national functions. With the formation of the Sri Lanka Army, the site served as an intake center for army apprentices, and later housed the Ministry of Education and the Department of Examinations. Blending a profound heritage in both education and national defence, this historic land stood as the most fitting location to establish Defence Services College.

The school was officially declared open on the 17th of January 2007, enrolling 172 students into Grade 1 alongside an academic staff of 8 teachers, under the guidance of its founding principal, Mrs. Sujatha Devendra. Today, the school is led by the incumbent principal, Mrs. Madhuka Fernando, supported by an academic staff exceeding 150 teachers and an administrative and operational staff of over 120 personnel. While academic affairs are overseen directly by the Ministry of Education, infrastructure development and maintenance are managed by the Ministry of Defence.

Over the years, the student population has grown to more than 3,500. The college presented its first batch of candidates for the G.C.E. Ordinary Level examination in 2017, followed by its first batch of G.C.E. Advanced Level candidates in 2020. The school offers Advanced Level courses across the main academic streams and has laboratories and experienced teaching staff. As a national school, Defense Services College provides a range of educational facilities and aims to prepare students for further education and participation in society.
