= Don Anurasiri =

Sri Lankan cricketer (born 1966)

Personal information
- Full name: Sangarange Don Anurasiri
- Born: 25 February 1966 (age 60); Panadura
- Batting: Right-handed
- Bowling: Slow left-arm orthodox

International information
- National side: Sri Lanka (1986–1998)
- Test debut (cap 34): 14 March 1986 v Pakistan
- Last Test: 14 January 1998 v Zimbabwe
- ODI debut (cap 43): 2 March 1986 v West Indies
- Last ODI: 15 February 1994 v India

Career statistics
| Competition | Test | ODI |
|---|---|---|
| Matches | 18 | 45 |
| Runs scored | 91 | 62 |
| Batting average | 5.35 | 10.33 |
| 100s/50s | 0/0 | 0/0 |
| Top score | 24 | 11 |
| Balls bowled | 3973 | 2,100 |
| Wickets | 41 | 32 |
| Bowling average | 37.75 | 45.75 |
| 5 wickets in innings | 0 | 0 |
| 10 wickets in match | 0 | 0 |
| Best bowling | 4/71 | 3/40 |
| Catches/stumpings | 4/– | 10/– |
- Source: CricInfo, 9 February 2006

Sangarange Don Anurasiri (born 25 February 1966) is a former Sri Lankan cricketer who played in 18 Test matches and 45 One Day Internationals from 1986 to 1998. He was a left-arm orthodox spinner who spent his career in and out of the national side. Post-retirement, he spent many years as a member of Sri Lanka's national cricket selection committee. He was born at Panadura in 1966.

== International career ==
He made his Test debut aged just 20 in a match against Pakistan at Colombo on 14 March 1986. He only bowled four overs in the Test as Sri Lanka caused an upset with an eight-wicket victory. He never took a five wicket haul in his 18 Tests but was often successful for Sri Lanka in containing batsman especially on unresponsive wickets. His best series came against the touring Australians in 1992-93 when he took 10 wickets.

After some conflict with the Sri Lankan Cricket Board in 1994 it seemed that his international career was over but he made a comeback in 1997–98 against Zimbabwe. He partnered Muttiah Muralitharan and took 3 for 65 and 1 for 41 in a winning cause. Three first class games later he ended his cricket career.
