= Indika Gallage =

Sri Lankan cricketer (born 1975)

Personal information
- Full name: Indika Sanjeewa Gallage
- Born: 22 November 1975 (age 50); Panadura, Sri Lanka
- Batting: Right-handed
- Bowling: Right-arm fast-medium

International information
- National side: Sri Lanka (1999–2001)
- Only Test (cap 81): 18 November 1999 v Zimbabwe
- ODI debut (cap 103): 19 December 1999 v Zimbabwe
- Last ODI: 11 February 2001 v New Zealand

Career statistics
Competition	Test	ODI
Matches	1	3
Runs scored	3	17
Batting average	3.00	17.00
100s/50s	0/0	0/0
Top score	3	14
Balls bowled	150	144
Wickets	0	3
Bowling average	–	38.33
5 wickets in innings	–	0
10 wickets in match	–	0
Best bowling	–	2/42
Catches/stumpings	0/–	0/–
- Source: Cricinfo, 9 February 2017

Indika Sanjeewa Gallage (born 22 November 1975), or Indika Gallage, is a former Sri Lankan cricketer who played in one Test match and three One Day Internationals from 1999 to 2001. He is a right-handed batsman and a right-arm medium-fast bowler.

== International career ==
He has represented Sri Lanka at every level from Under-13s onward. In 1998 he toured with Sri Lanka in England. In 1999 he had a surprising year, in which, following his Commonwealth Games exploits in Kuala Lumpur the previous year, he played in Australia, Sharjah (in the Coca-Cola trophy) and Bulawayo, Zimbabwe, where he made his Test debut for his country.

== After cricket ==
He has now become an Australian citizen. He is an active club cricketer in Melbourne. He got married and has two boys and a daughter.
