= St. Sylvester's College =

- College Crest

Location
- Yatinuwara Veediya (Brownrigg Street); Kandy, Central Province, Sri Lanka; Sri Lanka; 7°17′56.6″N 80°38′09.2″E

Information
- Type: National
- Motto: Latin: Fortiter in re transl. to persevere with dedication
- Patron saints: Sylvester Gozzolini; Saint Benedict
- Established: 1 November 1940; 86 years ago
- Founder: Rev. Fr. Robert M. Perera O.S.B.
- Principal: R.A.A.R. Ranasinghe
- Staff: 200
- Grades: 1 – 13
- Gender: Boys
- Age: 6 to 19
- Enrollment: 4,000
- Language: Sinhala, Tamil and English
- Campus type: Urban
- Colours: Maroon, Ivory and Dark Blue
- Athletics: Yes
- Sports: Yes
- Nickname: Vesters, Crownsmen
- Alumni: Old Sylvestrines
- Website: stsylvesterscollege.lk

St. Sylvester's College (Sinhala: ශාන්ත සිල්වෙස්තර විද්‍යාලය; Tamil: செயின்ட் சில்வெஸ்டர் கல்லூரி) is a national boys' school located in Kandy, adjacent to the St. Anthony's Cathedral. It was founded by the Sylvestro Benedictine Congregation in 1940. It offers primary and secondary education, and the college is under the jurisdiction of the Ministry of Education. It has more than 200 teaching staff and more than 3,000 students.

== History ==
=== The first decades ===
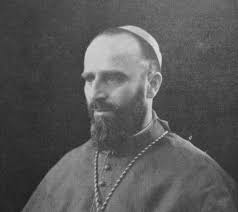
Bishop Bernard Regno, 3rd Bishop of Kandy, one of the co-founders of the college

St. Sylvester's began as a separate institution on 1 November 1940 (All Saints' Day) with Fr. D. Robert Perera as the principal. The college owed its inception to the foresight of Bishop Bernardo Regno and Abbot Weerasinghe, the heads of the Sylvestro-Benedictine congregation. They felt that a Catholic school in Kandy was a prime need, once the most prestigious St Anthony's College had been shifted to the banks of the Mahaweli at Katugastota. The school commenced with 250 pupils and twelve teachers.

During the tenure of Perera as principal from 1940 to 1949 and as rector from 1949 until he died in 1956, St. Sylvester's transformed a senior secondary school to an "A" grade institution. Under the stewardship of Perera, the Pancrazi Memorial Hall, and Cingolani Memorial Hall were built and two new blocks were added as well.

Perera negotiated with the education department and obtained another parcel of land above the Kandy-Matale railway line, which skirts one side of St. Sylvester's. A science laboratory, workshop, and library were creations of Fr. Robert, who was, the designer and builder of St. Sylvester's. Perera was a builder in more than one sense. He believed essentially in molding Sylvestrians in a Christ-like character under the Benedictine spirituality to lead a life of harmony as citizens of this alluring isle of Ceylon.

He had great faith in harmonising the classroom with the playing field and was instrumental in providing the sports facilities that the school needed, a tennis court and a boxing ring. During his tenure, the school won the Stubbs Shield in boxing for three successive years, produced outstanding sportspeople, who won the national championship while in college, and represented the country at international events such as the British Empire Games.

D. Joseph Noel Seneviratne took over the reins as principal in 1949, as envisioned by Perera, who remained as director. After the death of Fr. Robert in 1956, Rev Paulinus Vadekapattany OSB succeeded as the rector. Principal Seneviratne served the college for 24 years.

In 1961, the Primary department was established on Lady Manning's Drive, close to the school's main administrative building. In 1968, Seneviratne resigned to take over the duties as the director of a junior university, and the Vice-Principal, K.S. Gunaratne, succeeded him.

The school celebrated its 80th anniversary in 2020, with a nine-a-side hockey tournament, a football competition and other events.

== List of Principals ==
In office	Principal	Notes
1940–1949	Rev. Fr. D. Robert M. Perera O.S.B.	Founder of St. Sylvester's College
1949–1968	D. J. N. Senevirathne (M.A.Hons. (Columbia), B.A.Hons. (London), Cert. Cey. History, Trd.)	
1968–1970	K. S. Gunarathne (B.A. (London) – Trained)	
1970–1976	W. B. Gopallawa (B.A.Hons. (London) – Trained)	
1979	A. Karunarathne	Interim
1976–1995	Bertie Niilegoda (BSc (Cey.))	
1995–1998	Ashoka B. Herath)	
1998–2001	G. W. Abeysinghe	
2001	Bandula Gunawardana	Interim
2001–2017	T. Ranil. S. Meetiyagoda	Retired
2017–2022	P. G. S. Bandara	
2023 – Present	R. A. A. R. Ranasinghe	Present Principal

== Awards ==
=== Cingolani Gold Medal ===
The Cingolani Gold Medal is awarded each year to the "best all-round boy" at St. Sylvester's College. The Cingolani Gold Medal is the highest honour that the school can bestow. It is awarded annually to the best all-round student with the best performance in academics and sports in honorable memory of Abbot Leo Cingolani, the third Sylvestrine monk to arrive in British Ceylon. It is awarded using on a secret ballot conducted among the senior boys and the staff whose votes, together with that of the Rector (now Principal). This is awarded at the prize-giving under the patronage of the chief guest.

Past winners of the Cingolani Gold Medal:

- 1948 – Z. N. Massis,
- 1952 – G. S. Fernando.
- 1953 – Hillary Perera,
- 1954 – M. Marshall.
- 1956 – Gerry Alexander Hidelaratchchi
- 1962 – Mervyn Rodrigo
- 1967 – Daya Laxman
- 1969 – Junaid M. Ayub
- 1971 – Kithsiri Wijesundara
- 1986 – Mohammed Niyaz
- 2017 – Yasith Udagedara
- 2019 – Sanka Daminda
- 2023 - Vishwa Varnajith

== Main administrative building ==
The main administrative building is the oldest academic building within the world heritage zone by UNESCO and declared as a conserved structure. Formerly owned by St. Anthony's College, Kandy, this four-storied building is a blend of Victorian, Edwardian, and Georgian styles.

== College Crest ==
The Original College crest designed by the then head prefect, Master Kiriella.

The original college crest was designed by the then head prefect of the college, Master Kiriella. Which was later modified a little in colours. The Legend of crest as follows:

- The Crown: Represents Royalty. The highest authority of the country during the time of the school's inception.
- The Red (now Maroon) Cross: Represents the Roman Catholic faith on which the school was built.
- The Book: Represents the Holy Bible and education. Includes the motto "Fiat Justitia".
- The Cloud and the Rays: Depicts the concept of heaven and that the heavenly blessings will shower upon the school through the Holy Spirit.
- The Mountains: Represents the city of Kandy, the hill capital.
- The Wand: Represents the wand of the patron, St. Sylvester, and the authority of the Sylvestro Benedictine Congregation.
- The Flower Trees and the Bees: The bees represent the students and the old boys, while the trees represent the school from which they benefit and benefited.
- The Scroll: Includes the motto "Fortiter In Re".

== School anthem ==
External videos
- St. Sylvester's College Anthem

St. Sylvester's College has used various school anthems since 1940. During the early years, God Save the King was sung as a school anthem, followed by the Pasal Mavuni Jaya Wewa anthem and in the 1970s it was changed to the Dana Mana Ranjitha anthem.

== Annual Big Match – Battle of the Babes ==
The Battle of the Babes is played annually between St. Sylvester's College and Vidyartha College since 1958, except for three years. As of 2023, 63 Big Matches have been played. St. Sylvester's College has won 16 matches, Vidyartha College has won 3 matches, and 45 matches have been drawn.

== See also ==
- List of St. Sylvester's College alumni
- Battle of the Babes
