= 2021 in Sri Lanka =

- Decades: 2000s; 2010s; 2020s
- See also: Other events of 2021; Timeline of Sri Lankan history

The following lists notable events that took place during the year 2021 in Sri Lanka.

== Incumbents ==
=== National ===
President	Prime Minister	Speaker	Chief Justice	Opposition Leader
Gotabaya Rajapaksa (Age 72)	Mahinda Rajapaksa (Age 76)	Mahinda Yapa Abeywardena (Age 76)	Jayantha Jayasuriya	Sajith Premadasa (Age 54)
Sri Lanka Podujana Peramuna (since 18 November 2019)	Sri Lanka Podujana Peramuna (since 21 November 2019)	Sri Lanka Podujana Peramuna (since 20 August 2020)	Independent (since 29 April 2019)	Samagi Jana Balawegaya (since 3 January 2020)

=== Provincial ===
Governors

- Central Province – Lalith U Gamage
- Eastern Province – Anuradha Yahampath
- North Central Province – Tissa Vitharana
- Northern Province – P. S. M. Charles
- North Western Province – A. J. M. Muzammil
- Sabaragamuwa Province – Tikiri Kobbekaduwa
- Southern Province – Willy Gamage
- Uva Province – Raja Collure
- Western Province – Roshan Goonatilake

Chief Ministers

- Central Province – Sarath Ekanayake
- Eastern Province – Ahamed Nazeer Zainulabdeen
- North Central Province – Peshala Jayarathne
- Northern Province – C. V. Vigneswaran
- North Western Province – Dharmasiri Dassanayake
- Sabaragamuwa Province – Maheepala Herath
- Southern Province – Shan Wijayalal De Silva
- Uva Province – Chamara Sampath Dassanayake
- Western Province – Isura Devapriya

== Events ==
- COVID-19 pandemic in Sri Lanka
- 2019–present Sri Lankan economic crisis

== Events by month ==
=== January ===
- 1 January
  - Cinema halls all across the island are reopened under strict health guidelines.
  - Suranga Udari becomes the first deaf female news reporter as well as the first sign language journalist in Sri Lanka.
- 8 January
  - State Minister of Batik, Handloom and Local Apparel Products Dayasiri Jayasekara tests positive for COVID-19.
  - The fall armyworm, a pest locally dubbed the Sena caterpillar which has threatened numerous cultivations across the country, is reported to have spread across eight provinces and destroyed several cultivations of corn, pumpkin, beans and radish.
- 10 January
  - Cabinet Minister Rauff Hakeem tests positive for COVID-19.
  - A disease begins spreading among cattle across several villages in the Rambawa Divisional Secretariat.
- 11 January
  - Schools in all areas except in the Western Province and other isolated areas are reopened with strict health guidelines.
  - Cabinet Minister Vasudeva Nanayakkara tests positive for COVID-19.
- 12 January – MP Ranjan Ramanayake is sentenced to 4 years of rigorous imprisonment by the Supreme Court for attempted contempt of court.
- 14 January – South Asia's largest tire factory, the Ferentino Tyre company, is declared open in Horana by President Gotabaya Rajapaksa.
- 18 January – State Minister of Primary Education and Education Services Piyal Nishantha tests positive for COVID-19.
- 21 January – Sri Lankan cricketers Binura Fernando and Chamika Karunaratne test positive for COVID-19.
- 23 January – Health Minister Pavithra Wanniarachchi tests positive for COVID-19.
- 25 January
  - Parliamentarian Attorney-at-Law Wasantha Yapa Bandara tests positive for COVID-19.
  - Sri Lankan badminton player Niluka Karunaratne tests positive for COVID-19.
- 27 January – State Minister of Coconut, Kithul and Palmyrah Cultivation Promotion and Related Industrial Product Manufacturing & Export Diversification Arundika Fernando tests positive for COVID-19.
- 28 January
  - The first consignment of the Indian government-gifted Oxford–AstraZeneca COVID-19 vaccine is officially handed over to President Gotabaya Rajapaksa by High Commissioner of India Dr. Gopal Baglay at the Colombo airport.
  - Sri Lanka is ranked 10th in the list of countries that have handled the coronavirus pandemic the best by the Australian Lowy Institute.
- 29 January
  - Island-wide vaccination of the Indian government-gifted 'AstraZeneca Covishield' vaccine begins.
  - Popular actor Bimal Jayakody tests positive for COVID-19.
- 30 January – The total number of COVID-19 deaths in Sri Lanka exceeds 300.

=== February ===
- 2 February
  - Dr. Gayan Danthanarayana, who was associated with the Ragama Teaching Hospital, dies from complications due to COVID-19. He is the first Sri Lankan doctor actively engaged in COVID-19 treatments to fall victim to the virus.
  - Tamil Nadu Q-branch sleuths arrest notorious Sri Lankan drug lord Sinnaiya Gunasekaram, also known as Kimbula Ela Guna, who had links with the LTTE, at Chennai International Airport.
  - Former Speaker W. J. M. Lokubandara tests positive for COVID-19.
  - Governor of the Southern Province Dr. Willy Gamage tests positive for COVID-19.
- 3 February – Sri Lanka cricket head coach Mickey Arthur and international cricketer Lahiru Thirimanne test positive for COVID-19.
- 12 February – The COVID-19 variant spreading in the UK: B.1.1.7 UK lineage is detected from samples obtained in Colombo, Awissawella, Vavuniya and Biyagama.
- 14 February – Former Speaker of the Parliament W. J. M. Lokubandara dies at the age of 79, due to complications from COVID-19.
- 15 February – Total number of COVID-19 deaths in Sri Lanka exceeds 400.
- 16 February – Members of Parliament are inoculated with the Oxford AstraZeneca COVID-19 vaccine.
- 18 February – Sri Lanka international cricketer Dhammika Prasad announces his retirement from international cricket after an 8-year career.
- 21 February – Popular actors Sajitha Anthony, Sangeeth Prabhu and Kokila Jayasuriya all test positive for COVID-19.
- 22 February – International cricketer Lahiru Kumara tests positive for COVID-19.
- 23 February – Sri Lanka international cricketer and captain Upul Tharanga announces his retirement from international cricket after a 15-year career.

=== March ===
- 1 March
  - The G. C. E. Ordinary Level examinations are held in 4513 examination centers across the island, with 622,351 private candidates and school students sitting for the exams under strict health measures.
  - The decapitated body of a woman was discovered inside a large traveling bag left unattended at Gas Works Junction in Dam Street, Colombo. The victim was identified as a 30-year-old resident of Theppanwa in the Kuruvita Police area. After police investigations, the culprit was identified as a Sub-Inspector who was attached to the Buttala Police; said culprit later committed suicide.
- 2 March – Iranaitivu is selected as a burial site for COVID-19 deaths.
- 3 March – International cricketer Akila Dananjaya becomes the first bowler to take hat-trick and be hit for the maximum of six sixes in an over in the same match, during a match against the West Indies.
- 4 March – Gampaha Wickramarachchi University of Indigenous Medicine becomes the 16th National University of Sri Lanka, with the official launch being hosted by President Gotabaya Rajapaksa.
- 5 March – Sudupaththinachenai is identified as another burial site for COVID-19 deaths.
- 7 March – Total number of COVID-19 deaths in Sri Lanka exceeds 500.
- 12 March
  - The South African variant (B.1.351) of COVID-19 is discovered for the first time in Sri Lanka in a returnee from Tanzania.
  - The Department of National Botanic Gardens adds three new plant species at risk of extinction in Sri Lanka to the National Red List of 2020. The three plants are rinorea bengalensis, rinorea decora and crudia zeylanica.
- 15 March – Minister of Public Security Sarath Weerasekara announces plans to impose a ban on the burqa in Sri Lanka and the closure of more than 1,000 Islamic schools over "national security fears".
- 26 March – The Consumer Affairs Authority tests the quality of coconut oil available in the local market due to check for potential aflatoxin composition.
- 31 March – A new television channel Haritha TV is launched by the Sri Jinarathana Educational Institute of the Hunupitiya Gangaramaya Temple.

=== April ===
- 4 April – The Mrs. Sri Lanka 2021 pageant held at the Nelum Pokuna Theatre concluded in a melee after the reigning Mrs. World Caroline Jurie stripped the winner Pushpika De Silva of her crown.
- 5 April – President Gotabaya Rajapaksa orders the immediately suspension palm oil imports to Sri Lanka.
- 6 April – Naufer Maulavi is identified as the mastermind behind the 2019 Sri Lanka Easter bombings.
- 8 April – Mrs. World Caroline Jurie and Model Chula Padmendra are arrested by the Cinnamon Garden Police on three separate counts for the Mrs. Sri Lanka 2021 controversy.
- 9 April
  - Ajith Mannapperuma is sworn in as a Member of Parliament in the presence of the speaker, replacing Ranjan Ramanayake, who had been controversially arrested a few months earlier.
  - The Police Special Task Force arrests 44-year-old wanted drug peddler Sarath Kumara, alias "Cheaty", where he was in hiding inside a bunker in a house in Mulleriyawa.
- 10 April – The Blue Beach Island Underwater Gallery in Nilwella beach is declared open.
- 11 April – Sri Lankan Airforce Swimmer Leading Aircraftman Roshan Abeysundara sets a new Asian record by swimming 59 kilometers and 300 meters across the Palk Strait in 28 hours, 19 minutes and 43 seconds. Later, Abeysundara is promoted from Leading Aircraftman to Corporal of the Sri Lanka Air Force, in effect from 15 April 2021.
- 13 April – Total number of COVID-19 deaths in Sri Lanka exceeds 600.
- 23 April – Zaharan's father-in-law is arrested on charges of promoting extremism in Kekunugolla, Kuliyapitiya by the Terrorist Investigation Division (TID).
- 24 April – Former Minister Rishad Bathiudeen and his brother Riyadh Bathiudeen are arrested by the Criminal Investigations Department on the charges of aiding and abetting the suicide bombers responsible for the 2019 Sri Lanka Easter bombings.
- 25 April – Sri Lanka surpasses 100,000 COVID-19 patients, with 895 new positive cases.

=== May ===
- 1 May – Singapore stops entry or transit for any visitors with recent travel history to Bangladesh, Nepal, Pakistan or Sri Lanka.
- 2 May – Former international cricketer Upul Tharanga tests positive for COVID-19. As a result, the fund raiser T20 match between Sri Lanka Greats XI and Sri Lankan XI is postponed.
- 3 May
  - Total number of COVID-19 deaths in Sri Lanka exceeds 700.
  - Sri Lanka international cricketer and captain Thisara Perera announces his retirement from international cricket after a 12-year career.
- 5 May
  - Wanted murder suspect 'Aliwatte Asitha' is arrested by the Mattakkuliya Police.
  - Sri Lanka reports the first death of a pregnant woman due to COVID-19.
- 6 May – Vaccination of the Sputnik V COVID-19 vaccine manufactured in Russia commences in Sri Lanka.
- 7 May – Construction work for Sri Lanka's 07th Expressway, the Ruwanpura Expressway, is remotely launched by Prime Minister Mahinda Rajapaksa.
- 8 May
  - The COVID-19 death toll in Sri Lanka increases to 786 with 22 new fatalities, the first time the death toll has increased by more than 20 in a single day in the country.
  - The Sinopharm BIBP vaccine manufactured in China started to vaccinate to the residents of the Western Province.
- 9 May
  - Sri Lanka reports a record 2,672 new cases of COVID-19, the most cases ever recorded in a single day in a country.
  - Sri Lankan first-class cricketers Dhananjaya Lakshan and Ishan Jayaratne test positive for COVID-19.
- 10 May – Total number of COVID-19 deaths in Sri Lanka exceeds 800.
- 11 May – Sri Lanka's notorious underworld leader Mabulage Dineth Melan Mabula, alias "Urujuwa" is killed by police fire.
- 13 May – Notorious underworld leader Tharaka Perera Wijesekara, alias "Kosgoda Tharaka", who was in police custody under detention orders, is shot dead by police at Meerigama.
- 16 May – Total number of COVID-19 deaths in Sri Lanka exceeds 900.
- 17 May – Popular singer Bathiya Jayakody tests positive for COVID-19.
- 18 May – Total number of COVID-19 deaths in Sri Lanka exceeds 1000.
- 19 May
  - Sri Lanka surpasses 150,000 COVID-19 patients with 3,623 new positive cases.
  - Member of Parliament Marudapandy Rameshwaran tests positive for COVID-19.
- 20 May
  - Parliamentary Minister Mujibur Rahman has tests positive for COVID-19.
  - X-Press Pearl, a Singaporean container ship, catches fire off the coast of Colombo in Sri Lanka, which engulfed in flames on 27 May and caused severe huge environmental damages to the west coast of Sri Lanka.
- 22 May – Total number of COVID-19 deaths in Sri Lanka exceeds 1100.
- 23 May – Sri Lankan Opposition Leader Sajith Premadasa and his wife test positive for COVID-19.
- 24 May – Total number of COVID-19 deaths in Sri Lanka exceeds 1200.
- 25 May
  - Cyclone Yaas located in east-central Bay of Bengal intensifies into a severe cyclonic storm around Sri Lanka.
  - Member of Parliament Nalin Bandara and his wife test positive for COVID-19.
- 26 May – A massive sinkhole appears on the road leading to the Kotmale Dam, roughly 50 meters away from the dam.
- 27 May – Total number of COVID-19 deaths in Sri Lanka exceeds 1300.
- 27 May – Bangladesh records their first bilateral series win against Sri Lanka in any format, after winning the second One Day International with 103 runs.
- 29 May
  - Total number of COVID-19 deaths in Sri Lanka exceeds 1400.
  - Member of Parliament Kapila Nuwan Athukorala tests positive for COVID-19.
- 31 May – Sri Lanka surpasses 150,000 recoveries from COVID-19, with 1,915 new recoveries.

=== June ===
- 1 June – Total number of COVID-19 deaths in Sri Lanka exceeds 1500 with 43 confirmed deaths.
- 3 June – Total number of COVID-19 deaths in Sri Lanka exceeds 1600 with 42 confirmed deaths.
- 6 June – Total number of COVID-19 deaths in Sri Lanka exceeds 1700 with 46 confirmed deaths.
- 8 June – Total number of COVID-19 deaths in Sri Lanka exceeds 1800 with 54 confirmed deaths.
- 9 June – Total number of COVID-19 deaths in Sri Lanka exceeds 1900 with 67 confirmed deaths.
- 10 June – Total number of COVID-19 deaths in Sri Lanka exceeds 2000 with 101 confirmed deaths.
- 12 June – Total number of COVID-19 deaths in Sri Lanka exceeds 2100 with 63 confirmed deaths.
- 13 June – Total number of COVID-19 deaths in Sri Lanka exceeds 2200 with 67 confirmed deaths.
- 14 June
  - The Criminal Investigations Department arrest the captain of the X-Press Pearl container ship.
  - Total number of COVID-19 deaths in Sri Lanka exceeds 2300 with 55 confirmed deaths.
- 16 June – Total number of COVID-19 deaths in Sri Lanka exceeds 2400 with 51 confirmed deaths.
- 18 June – Total number of COVID-19 deaths in Sri Lanka exceeds 2500 with 54 confirmed deaths.
- 20 June
  - Sri Lanka surpasses 200,000 recoveries from COVID-19, with 1,996 new recoveries.
  - Total number of COVID-19 deaths in Sri Lanka exceeds 2600 with 52 confirmed deaths.
- 21 June – Total number of COVID-19 deaths in Sri Lanka exceeds 2700 with 71 confirmed deaths.
- 24 June
  - Former parliamentarian Duminda Silva, who had earlier been sentenced to death, is released under a special presidential pardon.
  - A Liberian-flagged container ship, the MSC Messina, catches fire in the Indian Ocean halfway between Sri Lanka and the Malacca Strait. The fire broke out in the engine room of the ship, at about 480 nautical miles away from the Great Basses Reef Lighthouse, Kirinda.
  - Total number of COVID-19 deaths in Sri Lanka exceeds 2800 with 45 confirmed deaths.
- 26 June
  - Total number of COVID-19 deaths in Sri Lanka exceeds 2900 with 43 confirmed deaths.
  - Sri Lanka exceeds 250,000 COVID-19 patients with 1,086 new cases.
- 27 June – Sri Lankan cricket fans began criticizing the national cricket team on social media under the hashtag #Unfollowcricketers following the team's performance in the T20I series against England.
- 28 June
  - Total number of COVID-19 deaths in Sri Lanka exceeds 3000 with 45 confirmed deaths.
  - Three international cricketers, Danushka Gunathilaka, Kusal Mendis and Niroshan Dickwella are found in the Durham marketplace breaching bio bubble during the England tour. All three are suspended for the remainder of the tour and flown back to Sri Lanka, with immediate effect. On 31 July 2021, the trio was suspended from international cricket for a year and fined 10 million rupees (US$50,000 approx), and was banned from playing domestic cricket for six months.
- 30 June
  - Kanya D'Almeida wins the 2021 Commonwealth Short Story Prize, making her the first Sri Lankan to win the award.
  - Total number of COVID-19 deaths in Sri Lanka exceeds 3100 with 43 confirmed deaths.

=== July ===
- 4 July – Total number of COVID-19 deaths in Sri Lanka exceeds 3200 with 45 confirmed deaths.
- 5 July
  - Sri Lanka receives 26,000 doses of the US-made Pfizer–BioNTech COVID-19 vaccine, becoming the first South Asian country to receive the Pfizer vaccine.
  - Total number of COVID-19 deaths in Sri Lanka exceeds 3300 with 45 confirmed deaths.
- 8 July – Total number of COVID-19 deaths in Sri Lanka exceeds 3400 with 43 confirmed deaths.
- 10 July – Total number of COVID-19 deaths in Sri Lanka exceeds 3500 with 35 confirmed deaths.
- 13 July – Total number of COVID-19 deaths in Sri Lanka exceeds 3600 with 37 confirmed deaths.
- 15 July – A 16-year-old girl named Jude Kumar Ishalini from Diagama West in Agarapathana dies of serious burn injuries at the residence of former Minister Rishad Bathiudeen. The girl was employed as a domestic aide at the residence of Bathiudeen, who had received serious burn injuries on 3 July and later died on July 15 at the hospital. On 23 July, police arrested the wife of Rishad Bathiudeen, the ex-Minister's father-in-law and another person over the death. The following day, Sri Lankan Court grants permission to the Sri Lanka Police to detain for 48 hours and interrogate four suspects in connection to the death of the girl and the rape of another female within the same premises. Meanwhile, a child trafficker identified as Ponnaiah Bandaram alias Shankar and brother-in-law of ex-Minister Bathiudeen is also arrested. On 25 July, statements were recorded from 35 people about the death.
- 16 July
  - Sri Lanka receives its first batch of the Moderna COVID-19 vaccine, with over 1.5 million doses.
  - Total number of COVID-19 deaths in Sri Lanka exceeds 3700 with 41 confirmed deaths.
- 18 July – Total number of COVID-19 deaths in Sri Lanka exceeds 3800 with 48 confirmed deaths.
- 20 July – Total number of COVID-19 deaths in Sri Lanka exceeds 3900 with 47 confirmed deaths.
- 23 July – Total number of COVID-19 deaths in Sri Lanka exceeds 4000 with 43 confirmed deaths.
- 26 July – Total number of COVID-19 deaths in Sri Lanka exceeds 4100 with 48 confirmed deaths.
- 27 July – Total number of COVID-19 deaths in Sri Lanka exceeds 4200 with 63 confirmed deaths.
- 28 July
  - Sri Lanka has surpassed 300,000 total cases of COVID-19 with 1,300 new infections.
  - Total number of COVID-19 deaths in Sri Lanka exceeds 4300 with 66 confirmed deaths.
  - The world's largest cluster of star sapphires with 510 kg has been unearthed from Ratnapura, Sri Lanka. This star sapphire cluster has been named "Serendipity Sapphire".
- 30 July
  - Popular actress Hyacinth Wijeratne dies in a road accident near Lindula, after her vehicle had fallen into a precipice at the Nuwara Eliya–Thalawakale road.
  - Total number of COVID-19 deaths in Sri Lanka exceeds 4400 with 61 confirmed deaths.
  - Sri Lanka surpasses 275,000 recoveries from COVID-19, with 1,716 more recoveries.
- 31 July
  - Sri Lanka international cricketer Isuru Udana announces his retirement from international cricket after a 12-year career.
  - Total number of COVID-19 deaths in Sri Lanka exceeds 4500 with 67 confirmed deaths.

=== August ===
- 2 August – Total number of COVID-19 deaths in Sri Lanka surpasses 4600 with 74 more deaths.
- 3 August
  - Total number of COVID-19 deaths in Sri Lanka surpasses 4700 with 82 more deaths.
  - Agriculture Minister Mahindananda Aluthgamage tests positive for COVID-19.
- 4 August
  - Veteran actress Sriyani Amarasena tests positive for COVID-19.
  - Total number of COVID-19 deaths in Sri Lanka surpasses 4800 with 94 new deaths.
- 5 August
  - Veteran actor Jayasekara Aponsu and popular actress Roshana Ondachchi test positive for COVID-19.
  - The Karapitiya Teaching Hospital and Ratnapura Teaching Hospital declare a state of emergency within their premises as the ongoing COVID-19 outbreak continues to exhaust the healthcare system.
  - Popular actress Shalani Tharaka tests positive for COVID-19.
  - Total number of COVID-19 deaths in Sri Lanka surpasses 4900.
- 6 August
  - Sunil Perera, popular singer and leader of Sri Lankan band The Gypsies, tests positive for COVID-19 and is put on oxygen after suffering from breathing difficulties.
  - Three members of parliament, Janaka Thissakuttiarachchi, Rohana Dissanayake, and Dilip Wedaarachchi all test positive for COVID-19.
  - Incarcerated former member of parliament Ranjan Ramanayake tests positive for COVID-19, and is treated at the COVID-19 Treatment Center at the Angunukolapelessa Prison.
  - Popular actress Nayanathara Wickramaarachchi tests positive for COVID-19.
- 7 August
  - Popular actor and director Giriraj Kaushalya, actor Niroshan Wijesinghe, teledrama directors Sudath Rohana, Shirley P. Delankawala and the screenwriter and author Mahinda Prasad Masimbula all test positive for COVID-19.
- 8 August – Total number of COVID-19 deaths in Sri Lanka exceeds 5200 while the daily fatalities count surpasses 100 for the first time. The following two days, more than 100 deaths are recorded consecutively (118 victims on 9th and 124 victims on 10th).
- 11 August
  - Sri Lanka surpasses 300,000 recoveries from COVID-19.
  - Former Minister Mangala Samaraweera is hospitalized after being infected with COVID-19. On 16 August, his condition worsens and is moved to the ICU. However, Samaraweera later died on 24 August at the age of 65.
- 14 August – Total number of COVID-19 deaths in Sri Lanka surpasses 6000 with a record 161 number of deaths. On the 13th, 160 more deaths are recorded. The concerning trend gradually increased, with 167 deaths reported on the 15th, followed by 171 deaths reported on the 16th.
- 16 August – Sri Lankan international cricketer Kusal Perera tests positive for COVID-19 and goes into isolation for ten days.
- 17 August
  - Three new mutations of the Delta variant of SARS-CoV-2 virus (SA222V, SA701S and SA1078S spike mutations) are identified in Sri Lanka.
  - Twelve members of the Sri Lankan Parliament test positive for COVID-19, including Jaffna District MP and Tamil National People's Front (TNPF) leader Gajendrakumar Ponnambalam.
- 20 August
  - Total number of COVID-19 deaths in Sri Lanka exceeds 7000 with 198 more deaths.
  - The religious procession carrying the 'Sacred Pinnacle' and the 'Crest-Gem' of Sandahiru Stupa is scheduled to arrive at the Panadura Rankoth Viharaya.
- 23 August – The Sri Lankan music video Manike Mage Hithe sung by Yohani and Satheeshan surpasses 50 million views, making it the first Sri Lankan YouTube video to surpass 50 million views.
- 23 August – Total number of COVID-19 deaths in Sri Lanka exceeds 7500 with 190 more deaths.
- 24 August – State Minister of Development of Minor Crops-related Industries and Export Promotion Janaka Wakkumbura tests COVID-19 positive.
- 25 August
  - Total number of COVID-19 deaths in Sri Lanka exceeds 8000 with 209 more deaths, marking the first time daily COVID-19 deaths have breached 200 death toll.
  - Coronavirus caseload of Sri Lanka exceeds 400,000 according to the Epidemiology Unit of the Health Ministry.
  - Former Police Media Spokesperson Senior DIG Ajith Rohana contracts COVID-19.
- 28 August – Trade Minister Bandula Gunawardena tests positive for COVID-19. Meanwhile, with 212 new deaths, the total number of COVID-19 deaths in Sri Lanka exceeds 8500.
- 30 August
  - Total number of COVID-19 deaths in Sri Lanka exceeds 9000 with 194 more deaths.
  - Dinesh Priyantha Herath clinches a historic gold medal for Sri Lanka in the men's javelin throw F46 category with a new world record of 67.79 m, claiming Sri Lanka's first ever paralympic gold medal and also securing Sri Lanka's first medal at the 2020 Tokyo Paralympics.

=== September ===
- 1 September – Total number of COVID-19 deaths in Sri Lanka exceeds 9500 with 204 more deaths.
- 3 September
  - Notorious drug trafficker and underworld gang Amila Prasanna Hettihewa alias 'Sunshine Sudda' is killed in a shooting at Kotawila, Matara.
  - Sri Lankan researchers locate the ruins of an ancient Buddhist Temple complex inside the dense jungles of Thoppigala.
  - Oshini Devindya Gunawardena, a nine-year-old student of Ferguson High School, Ratnapura wins the gold medal at the Finals of the FIDE Online Youth Chess World cup.
- 4 September
  - Sri Lanka Navy with Sri Lanka Police and other intelligence services in international waters south of Sri Lanka seized a foreign fishing vessel carrying over 336 kg of heroin worth over Rs. 3100 million gross street value.
  - Total number of COVID-19 deaths in Sri Lanka exceeds 10,000 with 189 more deaths.
- 6 September – Total number of COVID-19 deaths in Sri Lanka exceeds 10,500 with 184 more deaths.
- 8 September – Sri Lanka surpasses 400,000 recoveries from COVID-19.
- 10 September – Total number of COVID-19 deaths in Sri Lanka exceeds 11,000 with 157 more deaths.
- 13 September – Total number of COVID-19 deaths in Sri Lanka exceeds 11,500 with 136 more deaths.
- 14 September – Former Olympic silver medalist Susanthika Jayasinghe tests positive for COVID-19.
- 17 September
  - The total number of COVID-19 positive cases in Sri Lanka surpasses 500,000.
  - Total number of COVID-19 deaths in Sri Lanka exceeds 12,000 with 84 more deaths.
- 23 September – Total number of COVID-19 deaths in Sri Lanka exceeds 12,500 with 82 more deaths.
- 24 September – COVID-19 inoculation program begins with Pfizer vaccine for teens of ages 12 to 19 with disabilities or chronic illnesses.
- 26 September
  - Member of the Parliament Chandima Weerakkody tests positive for COVID-19.
  - The locally mutated Delta variant of COVID-19: B.1.617.2.28 is assigned to a new Delta sub-lineage, called "Delta AY.28.COV-lineage".
- 29 September – Sri Lanka suspends importing organic nitrogen fertilizer from a Chinese company for the Maha Season after harmful bacteria were identified in tested samples.

=== October ===
- 1 October
  - The island-wide quarantine curfew in Sri Lanka, which was in effect for over a month, is lifted at 4.00 AM.
  - Total number of COVID-19 deaths in Sri Lanka exceeds 13,000 with 55 more deaths.
- 3 October – The Pandora Papers, which included secret wealth and dealings of several world leaders, politicians and billionaires are leaked, which included financial documents of Former Minister Nirupama Rajapaksa and her husband Thirukumar Nadesan.
- 6 October – The total number of individuals fully vaccinated against COVID-19 in Sri Lanka exceeds 12 million (exactly 14,639,679 people in total) with AstraZeneca, Covishield, Sinopharm, Sputnik-V, Pfizer, Moderna, and Sinovac vaccines.
- 7 October – Sri Lanka Police simultaneously promotes three female Senior Superintendents of Police (SSPs), SSP N.D. Seneviratne, SSP A.R. Jayasundara and SSP W.J. Padmini, to the rank of Acting Deputy Inspector General (DIG) with immediate effect for the first time in Sri Lankan history.
- 9 October – Sri Lankan designer Ruwanthi Pavithra Gajadeera wins first place at the "Taiwan Fashion Design Award 2021" (TFDA), becoming the first South Asian to represent and win the award.
- 11 October – The Marine Environmental Protection Authority's (MEPA) Academy and a volunteer coastal cleanup program called the "Sayura Rakina Rella" are launched under the patronage of the subject minister, Prime Minister Mahinda Rajapaksa.
- 17 October – Total number of COVID-19 deaths in Sri Lanka exceeds 13,500 with 23 more deaths.
- 18 October – Sri Lanka's Minister for Youth and Sports Namal Rajapaksa and over a hundred members of the Buddhist clergy land in the Kushinagar International Airport in Uttar Pradesh at the inauguration of the international airport as the first international flight landing.
- 20 October – Sri Lanka receives the first shipment of 100,000 liters of Nano Nitrogen liquid fertilizer, imported from India for cultivation in the Maha Season.
- 21 October
  - A 31-year-old mother gives birth to six babies, three boys and three girls, at a private hospital in Colombo, making the first recorded birth of sextuplets in Sri Lanka.
  - The primary sections of schools with less than 200 students are reopened for academic activities, nearly six months after they were previously closed due to COVID-19 pandemic.
  - The All Share Price Index (ASPI) of the Colombo Stock Exchange (CSE) surpasses the 9,800 points-mark for the first time in history.
- 22 October – A 56-year-old man who died on September 26 at the Karapitiya Teaching Hospital is confirmed to have died from black fungus infection for the first time in Sri Lanka.
- 25 October – The primary sections of all government schools across the island are reopened for academic activities after six months of continuous closure.
- 28 October – Prof. Neelika Malavige is selected as a member of the World Health Organization's technical advisory committee on COVID-19.
- 31 October – Sri Lanka Navy's Leading Women Sailor Gayanthika Abeyratne sets two records for Sri Lanka in the women's 1500 meters and 5000 meters at the 99th National Athletics Championships.

=== November ===
- 4 November
  - A 51-year-old resident of the Mahabage area dies in a multiple vehicle collision due to a 16-year-old driving a luxury car.
  - The body of a female with her hands and feet tied up is recovered from a travelling bag abandoned in a garbage dump Mabima, Sapugaskanda. The next day, the remains are suspected to be that of a 44-year-old woman Mohamed Mumtaz, who resided in the Maligawatta flats. On 6 November, the police arrested a married couple aged 36 years, after they confessed to killing the woman.
- 11 November – Member of Parliament Charles Nirmalanathan tests positive for COVID-19.
- 13 November – Former Sri Lankan cricketer and captain Mahela Jayawardene is inducted into the ICC Cricket Hall of Fame, becoming the third Sri Lankan to achieve this feat.
- 14 November – The total number of confirmed cases of COVID-19 in Sri Lanka surpasses 550,000.
- 15 November – Total number of COVID-19 deaths in Sri Lanka exceeds 14,000 with 21 more deaths.
- 16 November – SSP Lanka Rajini Amarasena is appointed as the first female Director of the Police HQ Administration.
- 17 November
  - Veteran Sri Lankan traditional dancer Dr. Vajira Chitrasena is conferred the Padma Shri Award by the President of India for the year 2020.
  - Member of the Parliament Mano Ganesan tests positive for COVID-19.
- 18 November – The Sandahiru Seya in Anuradhapura is vested with the Venerable Maha Sanga, and the "Crest Gem" was unveiled by President Gotabaya Rajapaksa and Prime Minister Mahinda Rajapaksa.
- 19 November
  - Notorious criminal figure known under the alias 'Army Amila' is arrested by the Police Special Task Force in Danketiya in Tangalle.
  - A new sub-lineage of Delta variant of COVID-19 named B.1.617.2.104 is detected in Sri Lanka.
  - The total number of confirmed COVID-19 cases in Sri Lanka surpasses 555,000.
- 21 November – Former Sri Lanka cricket captain Ranjan Madugalle becomes the first match referee to officiate in 200 tests.
- 23 November – Minister of Power Gamini Lokuge tests positive for COVID-19.
- 24 November – The new state-of-the-art Kelani Bridge, also known as "Golden Gate Kalyani" in Peliyagoda is opened to the public.
- 25 November – SLPP parliamentarian Mahinda Samarasinghe tenders his resignation as a Member of Parliament with intentions to take up the post of Ambassador of Sri Lanka to the United States and Mexico. On 30 November, Manju Lalith Warnakumara is appointed to replace Samarasinghe.
- 26 November – Hewa Lunuwilage Lasantha, alias 'Tinker Lasantha', an individual involved in multiple criminal activities and the main suspect of the murder of 'Sunshine Sudda', is shot dead in a shootout with the police.
- 28 November – Six Sri Lankan national women cricketers and one official, who were participating in the 2021 Women's Cricket World Cup Qualifier in Zimbabwe, test positive for COVID-19.
- 29 November – Former minister and cricketer Arjuna Ranatunga leaves the United National Party (UNP) and resigns his membership of the party.

=== December ===
- 3 December
  - Sri Lanka confirms its first case of SARS-CoV-2 Omicron variant inside a 25-year-old female from Marawila who returned from Nigeria on 24 November.
  - A mob occurs on Wazirabad Road in Sialkot, Pakistan, where the workers of a private factory reportedly attacked and tortured Priyantha Kumara Diyawadana, the Sri Lankan export manager of Rajko industries, and burnt his body after killing him. According to the workers, Kumara was murdered for allegedly tearing down a religious poster of the ultra-radical Islamist Tehreek-e-Labbaik Pakistan (TLP) party, in which Quranic verses were inscribed. A total 131 suspects, including 26 main ones were arrested over lynching in the followings days. The severely cut and burnt corpse of Kumara was sealed and brought to Sri Lanka on 6 December. On 7 December, the Punjab Police arrests the "most-wanted" suspect Imtiaz alias Billi.
- 6 December – Total number of COVID-19 deaths in Sri Lanka exceeds 14,500 with 21 more deaths.
- 7 December – Major General Vikum Liyanage is appointed as the 59th Chief of Staff of the Sri Lanka Army.
- 9 December – Sri Lankan weightlifter Srimali Samarakoon wins a gold medal at the 2021 Commonwealth Weightlifting Championships in Tashkent, Uzbekistan.
- 15 December
  - Sri Lanka's traditional craftsmanship of making "Dumbara Ratā Kalāla" (Dumbara Weaving) is recognized by the UNESCO World Cultural Heritage.
  - Former Sri Lankan cricketer and current Bangladesh spin bowling coach Rangana Herath tests positive for COVID-19 while touring New Zealand for the two-match Test series.
- 25 December – A policeman opens fire at the Thirukkovil Police Station, killing four fellow police officers and injuring two others. The next day, the murdered police officers were posthumously promoted to their next rank.
- 26 December – Current limited over cricket captain Dasun Shanaka tests positive for COVID-19.
- 28 December
  - Sri Lanka international cricketer Jeevan Mendis announces his retirement from international cricket after 9-year career.
  - Sri Lanka wins the Bangabandhu Asian Central Zone Men's Volleyball Challenge Cup, beating the host country Bangladesh.

== Deaths ==
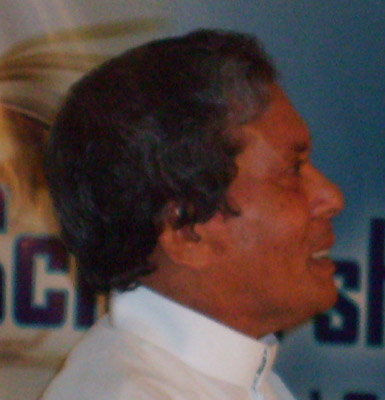
W. J. M. Lokubandara (b. 1941)

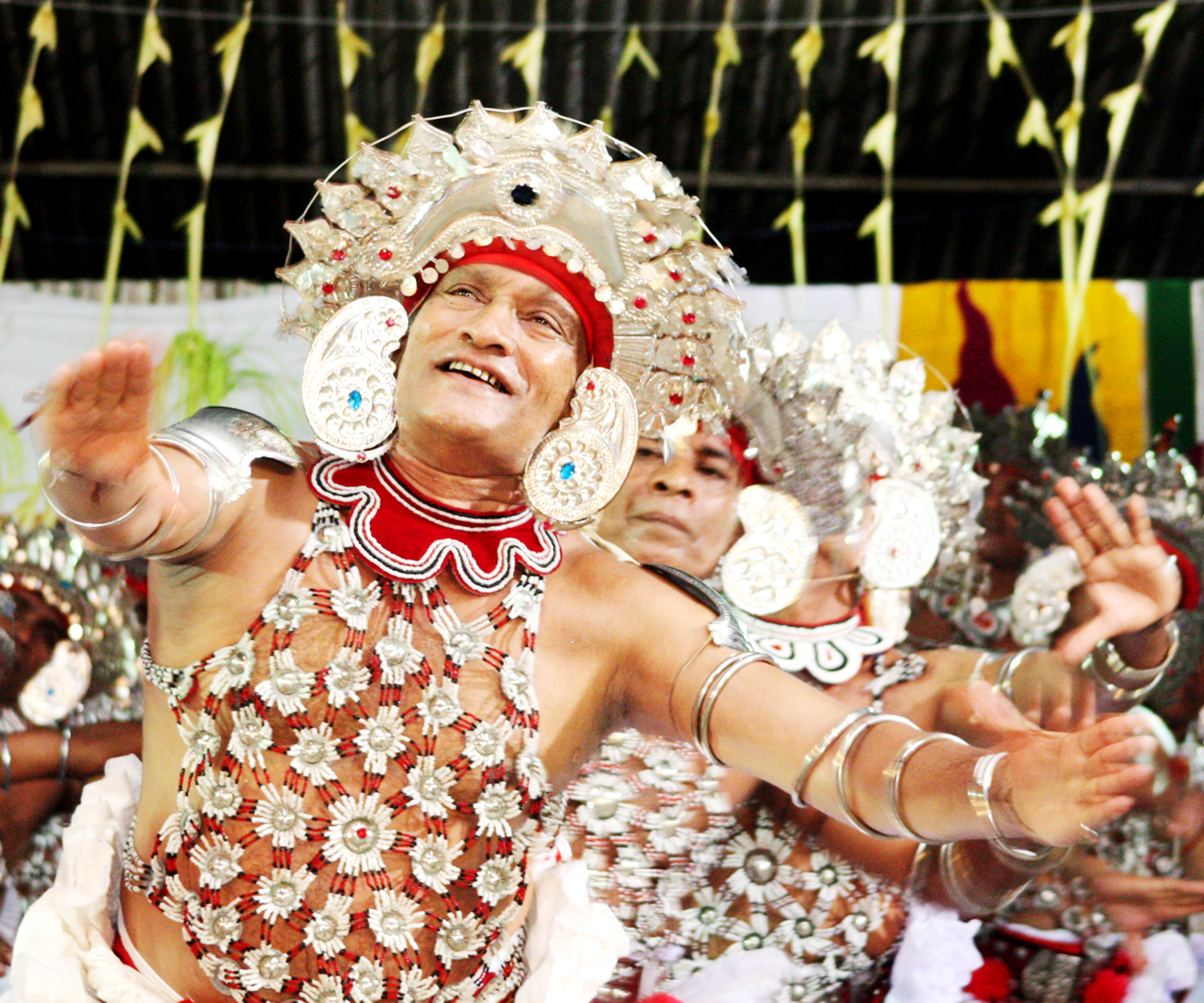
Kulasiri Budawatta (b. 1950)

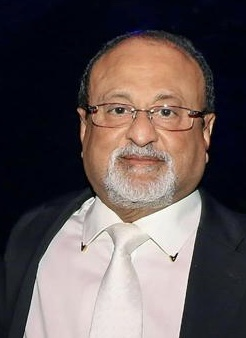
R. Rajamahendran (b. 1943)

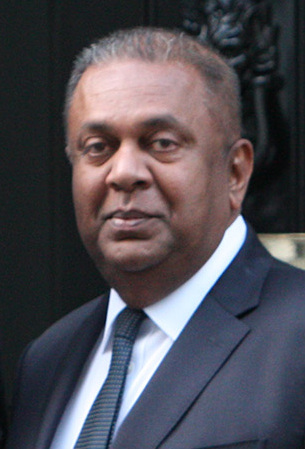
Mangala Samaraweera (b. 1956)

=== January ===
- 6 January – Prof. Bandusena Gunasekara, (linguist)
- 9 January – Navaratnam Kesavarajan, 59 (Tamil filmmaker)
- 20 January – Anura de Silva, (filmmaker)
- 21 January – Edwin Ariyadasa, 98 (journalist)
- 26 January – Nalini Abeypala, 82 (actress)
- 29 January – Dominick, (literary)

=== February ===
- 3 February – Jayantha Rukmani Siriwardena, (journalist)
- 4 February – Neville Fernando, 89 (doctor, former politician)
- 6 February
  - Miyuri Samarasinghe, 81 (actress)
  - Wadakada Navaratne, 62 (journalist)
- 11 February – Jayalal Rohana, 56 (dramatist)
- 14 February
  - W. J. M. Lokubandara, 79 (politician and former Speaker)
  - Michael Peiris, 82 (singer)
  - G. D. L. Perera, 86 (filmmaker)
- 15 February – Janaranjana Kaviratne, 68 (poet)
- 26 February – Anura Senanayake, (Senior Deputy Inspector General of Police)

=== March ===
- 5 March – Bandula Jayasekara, 60 (diplomat and journalist)
- 8 March
  - Wimala Amaradeva, 86 (singer and theater actress)
  - Ven Pannala Gnanaloka Thero, (Buddhist monk)
- 22 March – Most Venerable Agga Maha Pandita Kotugoda Dhammawasa Thero, 88 (Buddhist monk)
- 26 March – Pandula Andagama, 82 (anthropologist)

=== April ===
- 11 April – Dr. Wasantha Dissanayake, 58 (doctor)
- 29 April – Mahinda Balasuriya, 67 (Inspector General of Police)

=== May ===
- 11 May – Tassie Seneviratne, 86 (police superintendent and author)
- 17 May
  - Pradeep Gunawardana, 59 (businessman)
  - K. Thurairetnasingam, 80 (politician)
- 18 May – K. D. Justin, (art director)
- 24 May – Ranjith Siriwardena, (filmmaker)
- 26 May – Sureni Senarath, 61 (actress)
- 29 May – Kularatne Kurukulasuriya, 76 (journalist)
- 30 May
  - Venerable Baddegama Samitha Thero, 69 (politician)
  - Laki Senanayake, 84 (sculptor)

=== June ===
- 11 June – Sando Harris, 58 (actor)
- 21 June – Malani Govinnage, (author)
- 23 June – Kulasiri Budawatta, 71 (dancer)

=== July ===
- 13 July – Pramila Kuruppu, 87 (actress)
- 14 July – Wimaladasa Perera, 84 (journalist)
- 17 July – Camillus Perera, 74 (lyricist)
- 20 July – Elmo Rodrigopulle, 80 (journalist)
- 24 July – R. Rajamahendran, 78 (media mogul)
- 30 July – Hyacinth Wijeratne, 75 (actress)

=== August ===
- 17 August
  - W. A. Dharmasiri, 78 (film producer)
  - Ranjith Premaratne, 76 (film producer)
  - Raja Perera, 78 (journalist)
- 24 August – Mangala Samaraweera, 65 (politician)

=== September ===
- 3 September
  - Brigadier S.D Udayasena, 53 (army personnel)
  - Anura Perera, 76 (media mogul)
- 5 September – Uruwarige Heen Menika, (matriarch of the Veddha people)
- 6 September – Sunil Perera, 68 (musician)
- 22 September – Eliyantha White, 47 (spiritual healer)
- 28 September – Rangajeewa Jayasinghe, 45 (politician)

=== October ===
- 3 October – Samantha Epasinghe, 54 (actress)
- 5 October – Siran Upendra Deraniyagala, 79 (archaeologist)
- 18 October – Bandula Warnapura, 68 (cricketer)
- 23 October – Vishaka Siriwardana, 66 (actress)
- 24 October – Chandrishan Perera, 60 (rugby union player)
- 27 October – Ven. Dr. Welamitiyawe Kusaladhamma Thero, 84 (Buddhist monk)

=== November ===
- 11 November – Lakshman Wijesekara, 73 (musician)
- 13 November – Bhadra Nandani Gunaratne, (actress)
- 14 November – Gamini Susiriwardana, 58 (musician)
- 30 November – Sirisena Cooray, 90 (politician)

=== December ===
- 3 December – Sampath Tennakoon, 62 (dramatist)
- 4 December – Sarath Chandrasiri, 57 (actor)
- 7 December
  - Ananda S. Wijesiri, (dramatist)
  - Raja Collure, 83 (politician)
- 10 December
  - Sunil Soma Peiris, 72 (filmmaker)
  - Kumara Ranepura, 59 (actor)
- 24 December – Gunaratna Weerakoon, 74 (politician)
- 28 December – Buddhangala Ananda Thero, 78 (Buddhist monk)
