= Susiripala Manawadu =

Sri Lankan academic and politician

The Honourable Susiripala Manawadu
- සුසිරිපාල මානවඩු; சுசிரிபால மணவாடு

14th Governor of Southern Province
- Incumbent
- Assumed office 24 February 2026
- President: Anura Kumara Dissanayake
- Prime Minister: Harini Amarasuriya
- Preceded by: Bandula Harischandra

Personal details
- Born: Susiripala Manawadu
- Profession: Academic

Susiripala Manawadu is a Sri Lankan academic, professor and politician who has served as the 14th governor of Southern Province since 24 February 2026.

== Career ==
Manawadu previously served as senior assistant librarian and head of the Department of Sinhala at the University of Ruhuna. He currently serves as vice-chairman of the State Advisory Sub Committee on Radio, Newspapers and Social Media of the Arts Council of Sri Lanka.

He was appointed as the 14th governor of the Southern Province on 24 February 2026 by President Anura Kumara Dissanayake, filling the vacancy created by the death of the previous governor Bandula Harischandra on 16 November 2025. Manawadu assumed duties on 25 February 2026.
