= Crudia brevipes =

Conservation status
- Vulnerable (IUCN 2.3)

Scientific classification
- Kingdom: Plantae
- Clade: Tracheophytes
- Clade: Angiosperms
- Clade: Eudicots
- Clade: Rosids
- Order: Fabales
- Family: Fabaceae
- Genus: Crudia
- Species: C. brevipes

Binomial name
- Crudia brevipes Ridley

Species of legume

Crudia brevipes is a species of legume in the family Fabaceae. It is a tree endemic to Peninsular Malaysia. It is threatened by habitat loss.
