= Jay Mulafer =

Sri Lankan radio personality (born 1984)

- Born: Colombo, Sri Lanka
- Occupation: Broadcaster
- Employer: TNL Radio Network/ Lite FM
- Known for: Presenting morning radio show The Lite Café

Jay Mulafer (born 1984) is a Sri Lankan radio personality best known for presenting Lite FM's morning radio show The Lite Café.

== Career ==
While studying at D. S. Senanayake College, Colombo, he joined the TNL Radio Network as a trainee radio personality in 2003 and started hosting The Lite Café from 2004 onwards. Throughout his stint as the host and producer of The Lite Café, the show was continuously rated as one of the top English morning shows in Sri Lanka.

== Lite Cafe ==
As the host of The Lite Café, Mulafer was known for his observations and witticisms on Sri Lankan politics. Along with former Sri Lankan rugby player, sports administrator and broadcaster Chandrishan Perera, Mulafer popularized the sports segment "All Sport", which garnered a keen following among sports fans.
