= Lakshman Yapa Abeywardena =

Sri Lankan politician

Hon. Lakshman Yapa Abeywardena

Governor of North Western Province
- In office 17 May 2023 – 1 May 2024
- President: Ranil Wickremesinghe
- Prime Minister: Dinesh Gunawardena
- Preceded by: Wasantha Karannagoda
- Succeeded by: Naseer Ahamed

Governor of Southern Province
- In office 2 May 2024 – 25 September 2024
- President: Ranil Wickremesinghe
- Prime Minister: Dinesh Gunawardena
- Preceded by: Willy Gamage
- Succeeded by: Bandula Harischandra

Member of Parliament for National List
- In office 2 May 2024 – 22 September 2024
- Succeeded by: Vacant

Member of Parliament for Matara
- In office 1994 – 26 June 2015

Personal details
- Born: June 7, 1955 (age 71)
- Party: Sri Lanka Freedom Party
- Other political affiliations: United People's Freedom Alliance
- Education: St. Servatius' College; Mahinda College, Galle
- Website: http://www.lakshmanyapa.com/

Lakshman Yapa Abeywardena (born June 7, 1955) is a Sri Lankan politician who served as the governor of North Western Province and as the governor of Southern Province of Sri Lanka. A former representative of Matara District for the United People's Freedom Alliance in the Parliament of Sri Lanka, he served as the cabinet minister of parliamentary affairs, Minister of Media, Deputy Minister of Economic Development, Minister of Foreign Employment Welfare, deputy minister of civil aviation and as the cabinet minister of Investment Promotion. He was the state minister for State Enterprise Development in the government of President Maithripala Sirisena. He has been in parliament from 1994 and 2019.

Abeywardana was born in 1955 to a political family in Matara District, in Southern Province, where his father held local and provincial leadership positions. He was educated at St. Servatius College, Matara and Mahinda College, Galle.

Abeywardana has been a proponent of various micro-level development programs to enable the people to improve their quality of life. He is the Chairman of the Lakshman Yapa Abeywardana Foundation. Abeywardana resides in Colombo. He is married and has three sons. His son Pasanda Yapa Abeywardana is a member of the Southern Provincial council.

== See also ==
- List of political families in Sri Lanka
