= Crudia bibundina =

Conservation status
- Critically Endangered (IUCN 2.3)

Scientific classification
- Kingdom: Plantae
- Clade: Tracheophytes
- Clade: Angiosperms
- Clade: Eudicots
- Clade: Rosids
- Order: Fabales
- Family: Fabaceae
- Genus: Crudia
- Species: C. bibundina

Binomial name
- Crudia bibundina Harms

Species of legume

Crudia bibundina is a species of legume in the family Fabaceae. It is found only in Cameroon. Its natural habitat is subtropical or tropical dry forests. It is threatened by habitat loss.
