= Atukorale =

Atukorale අතුකොරල
- Pronunciation: Atukorala
- Language: Sinhala

Origin
- Region of origin: Sri Lanka

Other names
- Alternative spelling: Athukorala; Athukorale

Atukorale or Athukorala or Athukorale (Sinhala: අතුකොරල, romanized: Atukorala) is a Sinhalese surname.

== Notable people ==
- Amarakeerthi Athukorala, Sri Lankan politician
- Gamini Atukorale (1952–2002), Sri Lankan politician
- Henry Athukorale (1930–2009), Ceylonese army officer
- Kapila Athukorala, Sri Lankan politician
- Thalatha Atukorale (born 1963), Sri Lankan politician
