= Sri Lankan cricket team in India in 1997–98 =

International cricket tour

	India	Sri Lanka
- Dates: 13 November – 28 December 1997
Captains	Sachin Tendulkar	Arjuna Ranatunga

Test series
- Result: 3-match series drawn 0–0
Most runs	Sourav Ganguly (392)	Marvan Atapattu (268)
Most wickets	Javagal Srinath (9)	Ravindra Pushpakumara (8), Kumar Dharmasena (8)
- Player of the series: Sourav Ganguly (Ind)

One Day International series
- Results: 3-match series drawn 1–1
Most runs	Sachin Tendulkar (88)	Roshan Mahanama (119)
Most wickets	Debasis Mohanty (6)	Muttiah Muralitharan (4)
- Player of the series: Roshan Mahanama (SL)

The Sri Lanka national cricket team toured India during the 1997–98 cricket season, playing three Test matches and three One Day Internationals (ODIs). Both series were drawn; all three Tests were draws, and each side won one of the ODIs, tying the series 1–1. The other ODI, which was held on 25 December, was abandoned after three overs had been bowled, when after discussion between the two captains and the match referee, it was determined that the inconsistent bounce of the pitch was too dangerous for the players. This was the first occasion on which an international cricket match had been called off for this reason.

The third ODI was marred by umpiring controversy and disruption from the crowd. During India's innings, Ajay Jadeja was given out, after being caught behind. The umpire initially raised his finger to dismiss the batsman, but then changed his mind, and continued raising his finger to adjust his hat. He then turned down the appeal, and Jadeja continued to bat. Elmo Rodrigopulle, writing for Cricinfo, reported that "it was a mockery on the umpiring fraternity and what umpiring stands for." Later, in Sri Lanka's reply, when they were 205 for four, needing just 29 more runs for victory, the game was held up because spectators threw bottles onto the field. After a ten-minute delay, the match resumed, and Sri Lanka won by five wickets.

The tour began on 13 November, when the Sri Lankans played an Indian XI for Anshuman Gaekwad's benefit match, and concluded with the third ODI on 28 December. Sourav Ganguly was named player of the Test series, in which he was the leading run-scorer from either side, aggregating 392 runs. The most prolific batsman in the ODI series was Sri Lanka's Roshan Mahanama, who was named the player of the ODI series.

== Test series ==
=== 1st Test ===
19–23 November 1997
Scorecard

Sri Lanka	v	India
369 (125.2 overs); Marvan Atapattu 108 (244); Abey Kuruvilla 4/88 (27 overs)		515/9d (206.5 overs); Navjot Sidhu 131 (372); Muttiah Muralitharan 3/174 (75 overs)
251/6 (93.1 overs); Aravinda de Silva 110* (263); Javagal Srinath 3/75 (22 overs)

Match drawn
Punjab Cricket Association Stadium, Mohali
Umpires: Steve Bucknor (WI) and Srinivasaraghavan Venkataraghavan (Ind)
Player of the match: Aravinda de Silva (SL)

- India won the toss and elected to field.
- Lanka de Silva (SL) made his Test debut.
- Aravinda de Silva (SL) passed 1,000 runs for the year.
- Sourav Ganguly (Ind) passed 1,000 runs in Tests.

=== 2nd Test ===
26–30 November 1997
Scorecard

India	v	Sri Lanka
485 (155 overs); Sourav Ganguly 99 (188); Ravindra Pushpakumara 5/122 (32 overs)

Match drawn
Vidarbha Cricket Association Ground, Nagpur
Umpires: Cyril Mitchley (SA) and V. K. Ramaswamy (Ind)

- India won the toss and elected to bat.
- No play was possible on days 4 and 5 due to rain.

=== 3rd Test ===
3–7 December 1997
Scorecard

India	v	Sri Lanka
512 (162.1 overs); Sourav Ganguly 173 (361); Ravindra Pushpakumara 3/108 (28 overs)		361 (143.2 overs); Marvan Atapattu 98 (273); Rajesh Chauhan 4/48 (34 overs)
181/9d (42.4 overs); Rahul Dravid 85 (121); Kumar Dharmasena 5/57 (12.4 overs)		166/7 (82 overs); Sanath Jayasuriya 37 (86); Anil Kumble 3/56 (28 overs)

Match drawn
Wankhede Stadium, Mumbai
Umpires: Steve Bucknor (WI) and Arani Jayaprakash (Ind)
Player of the match: Sourav Ganguly (Ind)

- Sri Lanka won the toss and elected to field.
- Sachin Tendulkar (Ind) became the youngest India batsman to reach 4,000 runs in Tests.

== One Day International series ==
=== 1st ODI ===
22 December 1997
Scorecard

Sri Lanka; 172/9 (45 overs)	v	India; 173/3 (37.5 overs)
Roshan Mahanama 68 (115); Robin Singh 5/22 (5 overs)		Sachin Tendulkar 82* (86); Chaminda Vaas 1/19 (7 overs)

India won by 7 wickets
Nehru Stadium, Guwahati
Umpires: KS Giridharan (Ind) and Kutticode Murali (Ind)
Player of the match: Robin Singh (Ind)

- India won the toss and elected to field.
- Fog delayed start of play by 45 minutes and match was reduced to 45 overs per side.
- Sairaj Bahutule (Ind) made his ODI debut.

=== 2nd ODI ===
25 December 1997
Scorecard

Sri Lanka; 17/1 (3 overs)	v	India
Sanath Jayasuriya 6* (7); Javagal Srinath 1/6 (2 overs)

No result
Nehru Stadium, Indore
Umpires: Subroto Porel (Ind) and Devendra Sharma (Ind)

- Sri Lanka won the toss and elected to bat.
- The match was abandoned after three overs due to the pitch being declared unsafe by the match referee, Ahmed Ebrahim. It was the first such instance in international cricket.
- Hrishikesh Kanitkar (Ind) made his ODI debut.

=== 3rd ODI ===
28 December 1997
Scorecard

India; 228/6 (50 overs)	v	Sri Lanka; 229/5 (48.2 overs)
Sourav Ganguly 61 (86); Muttiah Muralitharan 3/53 (10 overs)		Aravinda de Silva 82* (90); Debasis Mohanty 3/58 (10 overs)

Sri Lanka won by 5 wickets
Nehru Stadium, Margao
Umpires: Krishna Hariharan (Ind) and Raman Sharma (Ind)
Player of the match: Aravinda de Silva (SL)

- India won the toss and elected to bat.
