= MSC Messina =

Liberian flagged container ship

History

Liberia
- Name: MSC Messina
- Operator: Mediterranean Shipping Company
- Yard number: CHB084
- Completed: 1995
- Identification: IMO number: 9074042

General characteristics
- Type: Container ship
- Length: 299.95 m (984 ft 1 in)
- Capacity: 4,743 TEUs
- Crew: 28

MSC Messina is a Liberian-flagged container ship. The ship is operated by Mediterranean Shipping Company which is the second largest container operator in the world. It was built in 1995.

== Fire ==
On 24 June 2021, the ship caught fire in the midway of the Indian Ocean halfway between Sri Lanka and Malacca Strait. The fire broke in the engine room of the ship, at some 480 nautical miles (890 km; 550 mi) away from the Great Basses Reef Lighthouse, Kirinda. The fire in incident took place when the ship departed from the Colombo Port to Singapore with around 28 crew members on board. It was revealed that the ship arrived to Sri Lanka on 22 June 2021. On 26 June 2021, the fire was brought under control by the crew members of the ship by using carbon dioxide to douse the fire. The Indian Coast Guard came to the rescue immediately as it deployed one of its ships and aircraft to provide assistance to the container ship during the rescue operations. At least one crew member was reportedly missing during the fire incident and search operations began. On 27 June 2021, the ship departed to Singapore once the fire was successful extinguished from the engine room.
