= List of governors of Southern Province =

Governor of Southern Province
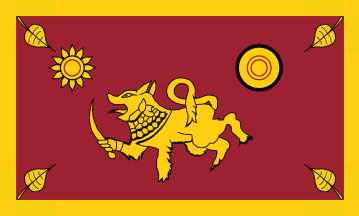
- Flag of Southern Province
- Incumbent; Vacant
- Appointer: President of Sri Lanka
- Term length: 5 years
- Inaugural holder: Mohammed Abdul Bakeer Markar
- Formation: 13 June 1988
- Website: governor.sp.gov.lk

The governor of the Southern Province of Sri Lanka (Sinhala: දකුණු පළාත් ආණ්ඩුකාරවරයා Dakunu palāth āndukāravarayā) is responsible for the management of the Southern Provincial Council. Some of the office's key functions include exercising powers vested in the governor by the Provincial Council Act No. 42 of 1987 amended by Act No. 28 of 1990 and the 13th Amendment to the Constitution.

== Governors ==
Parties

Independent United National Party Sri Lanka Freedom Party Sri Lanka Podujana Peramuna

No.	Name	Portrait	Party	Took office	Left office	Refs
1	Abdul Bakeer Markar		United National Party	13 June 1988	December 1993	
2	Leslie Mervyn Jayaratne		United National Party	December 1993	December 1994	
3	Neville Kanakeratne		Sri Lanka Freedom Party	January 1995	20 September 1999	
4	Ananda Dassanayake		Sri Lanka Freedom Party	September 1999	January 2002	
5	Kingsley Wickramaratne		Sri Lanka Freedom Party	1 February 2002	23 October 2006	
6	Kumari Balasuriya		Sri Lanka Freedom Party	23 October 2006	23 January 2015	
7	Hemakumara Nanayakkara		United National Party	23 January 2015	11 April 2018	
8	Marshal Perera		Independent	12 April 2018	9 January 2019	
9	Rajith Keerthi Thennakoon		Independent	9 January 2019	3 August 2019	
10	Hemal Gunasekara		Sri Lanka Freedom Party	4 August 2019	20 November 2019	
11	Willy Gamage		Sri Lanka Podujana Peramuna	21 November 2019	2 May 2024	
12	Lakshman Yapa Abeywardena		Sri Lanka Freedom Party	2 May 2024	25 September 2024	
13	Bandula Harischandra		Independent	25 September 2024	16 November 2025	
14	Susiripala Manawadu		Independent	24 February 2026	Incumbent	

== See also ==
- Chief minister (Sri Lanka)

== Notes ==
Sources

- "Former Officials of Southern Province Council". www.spcs.sp.gov.lk. Archived from the original on 2022-06-20.
