= Roshan Abeysundara =

Sri Lankan aircraftman and swimmer

- Born: 1989 (age 36–37); Talalla, Southern Province, Sri Lanka
- Education: Matara Central College, Matara
- Occupations: endurance swimmer, airforce officer
- Known for: Asian record holder for swimming across the Palk Strait
- Military career
- Allegiance: Sri Lanka
- Branch: Sri Lanka Air Force
- Service years: 2008-Present
- Rank: Corporal

Roshan Abeysundara is a Sri Lankan airman and swimmer, who also currently holds the Asian record for swimming across the Palk Strait as of April 2021.

== Swimming career ==
Roshan pursued his career in competitive swimming as a schoolboy at the Matara Central College where he also completed his primary and secondary education. He has also obtained level II standard from Sri Lanka Life Saving, the national body for life saving and water safety related activities in Sri Lanka. He underwent training from the veteran Sri Lankan swimmer Julian Bolling. He is currently affiliated as a Level III swimming instructor with the American Swimming Coaches Association.

=== Palk Strait expedition ===
On 10 April 2021, Roshan intended to swim across Palk Strait starting from the point of Talaimannar at around Sri Lankan local time 2 am. He reached Danushkodi and in vice versa he swam from Danushkodi to Talaimannar covering distance of about 59.3 km with a record timing of 28 hours and 19 minutes. He also broke the 50 year old Asian record for completing Palk Strait expedition within a short time surpassing the record of 51 hours set in 1971 by fellow Sri Lankan swimmer V. S. Kumar Anandan.

== Air force career ==
He joined the Sri Lanka Air Force in 2008 as an Airman. He was of the rank of Leading aircraftman in 2021 at the time of his swim across Palk Strait. His expedition received adequate support and guidance from the Commander of the Air Force Sudarshana Pathirana and following his accomplishment he was promoted to the rank of Corporal.
