= Suranga Udari =

Sri Lankan graphic designer, journalist, reporter and activist

- Education: Sri Shariputhra Maha Vidyalaya, Ahangama
- Occupations: graphic designer, journalist, news reporter and environmental activist
- Known for: Sri Lanka's first sign language reporter

Suranga Udari is a Sri Lankan graphic designer, journalist, news reporter and environmental activist. She is widely regarded as the first ever Sri Lankan female deaf journalist.

== Biography ==
She was born in a family of five children and two of her siblings were reportedly born with hearing impairments. She completed her primary and secondary education up to the Ordinary Level Education at the Sri Shariputhra Maha Vidyalaya, Ahangama, Galle District, Southern Province. She lives in Ahangama.

== Career ==
Udari initially pursued her career as a graphic designer and received diploma in Computer Software at the Lake House. She worked as a graphic designer at a private firm for about eight years and she was fired from the job due to the impact of the COVID-19 pandemic. She went onto pursue interest in the field of journalism after being sacked from the job of graphic designing. She faced constraints and barriers to find suitable job opportunities in the field of media as all of the prominent media houses in Sri Lanka refused to provide her job opportunity due to her hearing disability.

She also works as an employee at the Sri Lanka Central Federation of Deaf and also serves as the assistant secretary of Deaf Women's Association of Sri Lanka.

In September 2020, Udari was nominated as a participant for "Vibrant Voices" program by her colleagues who work as employees at the Sri Lanka Central Federation of Deaf (SLCFD). She received training in a five-day residential training camp from the Sri Lanka Development Journalist Forum (SDJF) under the initiative of "Vibrant Voices" program scheme.

Under the "Vibrant Voices" program, she reported her first programme as a journalist regarding the environmental issues and destruction caused due to the improper disposal of face masks in Hikkaduwa, Galle District. Her news report about the impact of disposal of face masks was published in January 2021 via MediaCorps Watch, which is a weekly news program organised by Sri Lanka Development Journalist Forum. On 1 January 2021 coinciding with the New Year, she was officially recognised as the first female deaf news reporter in Sri Lanka.

She became popular for reporting the environmental issues caused by face masks through using sign language and mobile journalism techniques. Udari also subsequently received a job offer from the Sirasa TV following her first news report which was published on MediaCorps Watch.
