= Crudia penduliflora =

Conservation status
- Vulnerable (IUCN 2.3)

Scientific classification
- Kingdom: Plantae
- Clade: Tracheophytes
- Clade: Angiosperms
- Clade: Eudicots
- Clade: Rosids
- Order: Fabales
- Family: Fabaceae
- Genus: Crudia
- Species: C. penduliflora

Binomial name
- Crudia penduliflora Ridley

Synonyms
- List: Crudia acuta de Wit; Crudia beccarii Ridl.; Crudia lanceolata Ridl.; Crudia mansonii Prain; Crudia mutabilis de Wit; Crudia ripicola de Wit; Touchiroa mansonii Prain

Species of legume

Crudia penduliflora is a species of plant in the family Fabaceae. It grows as a tree and is endemic to Peninsular Malaysia. It is threatened by habitat loss.
