= Crudia curtisii =

Scientific classification
- Kingdom: Plantae
- Clade: Tracheophytes
- Clade: Angiosperms
- Clade: Eudicots
- Clade: Rosids
- Order: Fabales
- Family: Fabaceae
- Genus: Crudia
- Species: C. curtisii

Binomial name
- Crudia curtisii Prain

Synonyms
- Crudia glauca Prain; Crudia scortechinii Prain

Species of legume

Crudia curtisii is a species of plant in the family Fabaceae. It is found in Malaysia.
