= Bandula Harischandra =

Sri Lankan politician (1962/1963–2025)

The Honourable Bandula Harischandra
- බන්දුල හරිස්චන්ද්‍ර பந்துல ஹரிச்சந்திரா

Governor of Southern Province
- In office 25 September 2024 – 16 November 2025
- President: Anura Kumara Dissanayake
- Prime Minister: Harini Amarasuriya
- Preceded by: Lakshman Yapa Abeywardena
- Succeeded by: Susiripala Manawadu

Personal details
- Born: 1962 or 1963
- Died: 16 November 2025 (aged 62)
- Education: University of Kelaniya; Sri Palee College
- Occupation: Civil servant

Bandula Harischandra (1962 or 1963 – 16 November 2025) was a Sri Lankan civil servant and politician who served as the governor of Southern Province from 25 September 2024 until his death on 16 November 2025.

== Early life and career ==
Harischandra received his secondary school education at Sri Palee College, Horana and graduated from Kelaniya University. In 1991, he joined the Sri Lanka Administrative Service and was initially appointed the assistant District Commissioner of Elections for the Ampara District. He subsequently served as the Galle Assistant District Commissioner of Elections.

He then served as Galle Four Gravets Divisional Secretary and Galle Additional District Secretary. He also worked as the acting District Secretary of Galle.

Harischandra was subsequently appointed Rathnapura District Secretary and Hambantota District Secretary before taking up the position of Secretary of Ministry of Social Empowerment, Welfare and Kandyan Heritage. He then served as the Secretary of Department of Wildlife Conservation and as the additional Controller General at the Department of Immigration and Emigration.

On 25 September 2025, Harischandra was appointed the governor of Southern Province by President Anura Kumara Dissanayake.

== Death ==
Harischandra died on 16 November 2025, at the age of 62.
