= Crudia balachandrae =

Conservation status
- Vulnerable (IUCN 2.3)

Scientific classification
- Kingdom: Plantae
- Clade: Tracheophytes
- Clade: Angiosperms
- Clade: Eudicots
- Clade: Rosids
- Order: Fabales
- Family: Fabaceae
- Genus: Crudia
- Species: C. balachandrae

Binomial name
- Crudia balachandrae Sanjappa

Species of legume

Crudia balachandrae is a species of plant in the family Fabaceae. It is endemic to Great Nicobar Island in the Nicobar Islands.
