= Sri Shariputhra Maha Vidyalaya =

Secondary School in Sri Lanka

Coordinates: 6.651836°N 80.698804°E

Sri Shariputhra Maha Vidyalaya (Sinhala: ශාරිපුත්‍ර මහා විද්‍යාලය) is a secondary school in Imbulpe, Balangoda, Sabaragamuwa Province, Sri Lanka. It was established in the 19th century. At present, more than 800 students are studying at the college. According to ancient documents, it was the first school in Balangoda education zone. Many politicians, lawyers, scholars, physicians, engineers and other government officers have studied at this college. Government graduated teachers and other education colleges' teachers conduct the classes for students up to G.C.E. A-Level. Normally, 1st or 2nd level government education service officer is appointed as the principal of the college. there are Buddhist and Roman Catholic educational backgrounds. Also according to the department of education, students of the college follow the local syllabus and face to A-Level and O-Level examinations which are conducted by government of Sri Lanka. According to the history of the college, it was established as a boys' college, however after 1950's it was converted into the mixed school by the government. Also according to the official document and students roll of the college founded principal of the college was Mr. Silva and the first student was Mr. Appusincho. Also, the college has more than 15 acres premise in Madagedaragoda, Imbulpe. The college conducts science and computer laboratory class in the full facilitated laboratory. One of the laboratories was a present of Hon. Srimao Bandaranayake in 1975.

== Houses ==
The students are divided among three houses:

- Surya (Sinhala: සුර්‍ය්) – Colour: Red
- Tharaka (Sinhala: තාරක) – Colour: Yellow
- Chandika (Sinhala: චන්දික) – Colour: Green

An annual track-and-field tournament among these houses is held at the beginning of the first term.

== College song ==
The college song is "Sri seriuth matha" (mother of Sri Seriuth), which is sung at the start of the school day and on important occasions.
