= Bandula Jayasekara =

Sri Lankan university professor, lecturer, and diplomat (died 2021)

- බන්දුල ජයසේකර
- Born: 1960 or 1961
- Died: March 5, 2021 (aged 60); Karapitiya Teaching Hospital, Galle
- Education: Trinity College, Kandy
- Occupations: journalist, broadcaster, newspaper editor, diplomat

Bandula Jayasekara also known as Bandula Jayasekera (Sinhala: බන්දුල ජයසේකර; 1960/1 – 5 March 2021) was a Sri Lankan journalist, broadcaster, newspaper editor and diplomat.

== Career ==
Bandula initially pursued his career in journalism and served as chief editor (former editor-in-chief) of the Daily News from 2006 to 2007. He also served as a columnist for Daily Mirror for a brief time period. He had worked in both electronic and print media networks during his career as a journalist before switching to his career as a diplomat.

He also became a strong admirer of the Presidency of Mahinda Rajapaksa and his administration especially during the final stages of the Sri Lankan Civil War. He served as director general, President's Office Media Unit, director general and spokesperson for Ministry of External Affairs during the presidency of Mahinda Rajapaksa. Bandula Jayasekara also served as a diplomat in Canada and Australia especially as Consul General in Toronto and Sydney respectively. In addition, he also served as Sri Lanka's Deputy Permanent Representative to the United Nations in New York, where he was accused of sexual harassment of a fellow diplomat in the Sri Lankan mission.

He then also worked as a host of Pathikada programme which was aired on Sirasa TV News First.

== Death ==
In July 2019, he was diagnosed with myelodyplastic syndrome blood cancer. In October 2019, he had issued a public appeal for financial assistance in order to undergo a bone marrow transplant surgery in Singapore. However, the transplant surgery was delayed for months due to the COVID-19 pandemic and he had to undergo treatment in Sri Lanka due to travelling issues as a result of the COVID-19 pandemic.

He died on 5 March 2021 at the age of 60 at the Karapitiya Teaching Hospital in Galle. Prior to his death, he underwent treatment in palliative care at the hospital.
