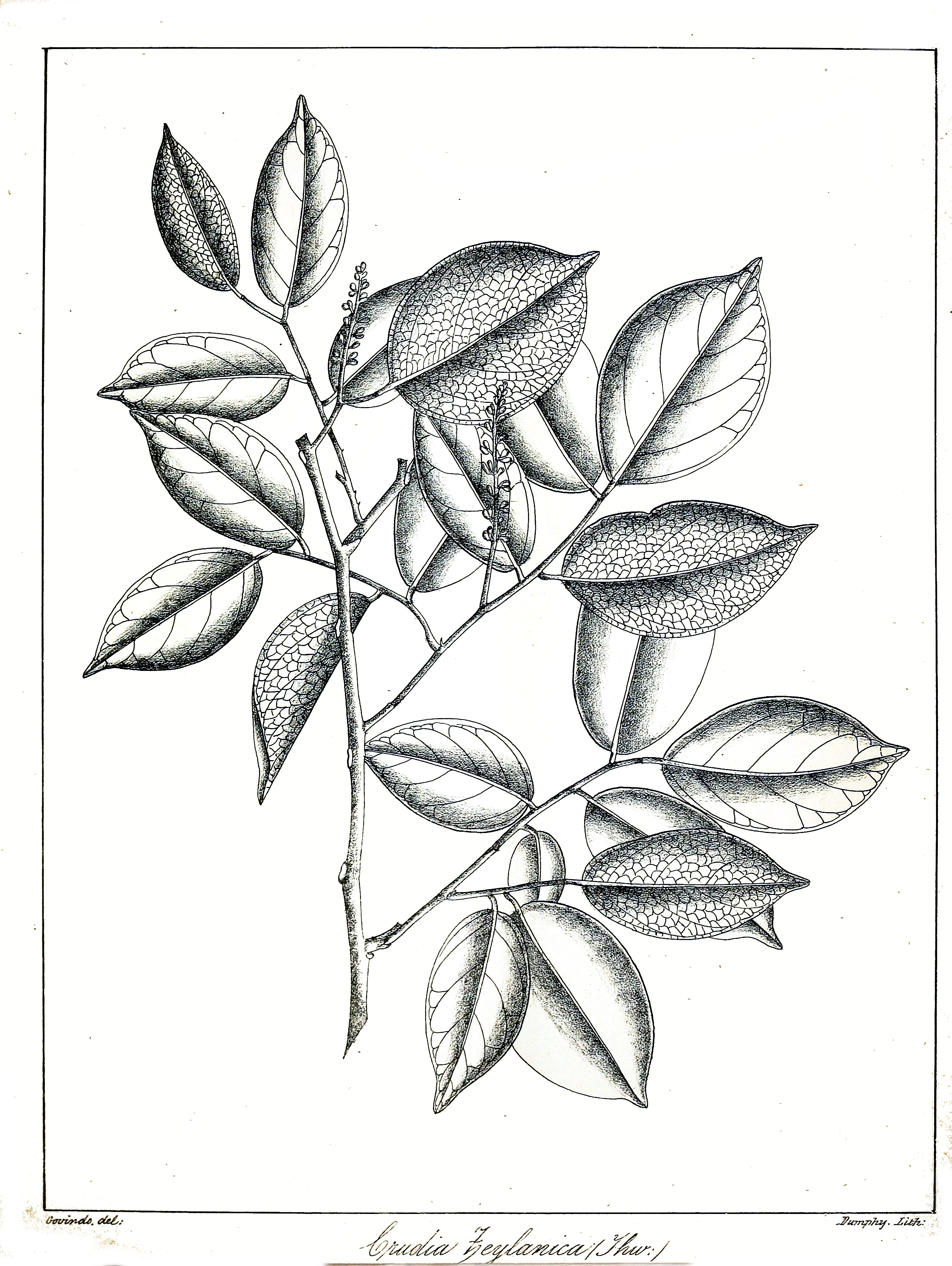

Conservation status
- Critically Endangered (IUCN 3.1)

Scientific classification
- Kingdom: Plantae
- Clade: Tracheophytes
- Clade: Angiosperms
- Clade: Eudicots
- Clade: Rosids
- Order: Fabales
- Family: Fabaceae
- Genus: Crudia
- Species: C. zeylanica

Binomial name
- Crudia zeylanica (Thwaites) Benth. 1868

Synonyms
- Detarium zeylanicum Thwaites

= Crudia zeylanica =

Species of legume

Crudia zeylanica sometimes known as Sri Lanka legume, is a species of plant in the family Fabaceae endemic to Sri Lanka. Once thought to be extinct, the plant was rediscovered in 2019. The Crudia zeylanica specimen located in the Daraluwa area in Gampaha, was cut down on Tuesday 11 July 2023, what had once been described as the world´s only known wild specimen of a species of legume, part of ongoing construction of a four-lane expressway.

== Rediscovery ==
Until 2019, this tree had not been seen since 1911, and was known only from the herbarium specimens. Thus, it was listed as extinct by an outdated IUCN Red List assessment. In 2019, the plant was rediscovered in a small plot of forest land located close to the Daraluwa Railway Station in Gampaha in several places in Gampaha District.

== Conservation effort ==
On 7 February 2021, Gampaha Divisional Forest Officer Devani Jayathilaka visited a construction site of the expressway from Kadawatha to Meerigama and discovered a Crudia zeylanica plant. She immediately prevented the workers from destroying it and informed the personnel regarding the matter. The news made a huge media circus in Sri Lanka, where several authorities cited the value of the tree and prevented it from being cut.

On 10 February 2021, the plant was ordained by the Buddhist clergy from the National Bhikku Front in an effort to protect it.
