= Kulasiri Budawatta =

Sri Lankan dancer (1950–2021)

- කුලසිරි බුදවත්ත
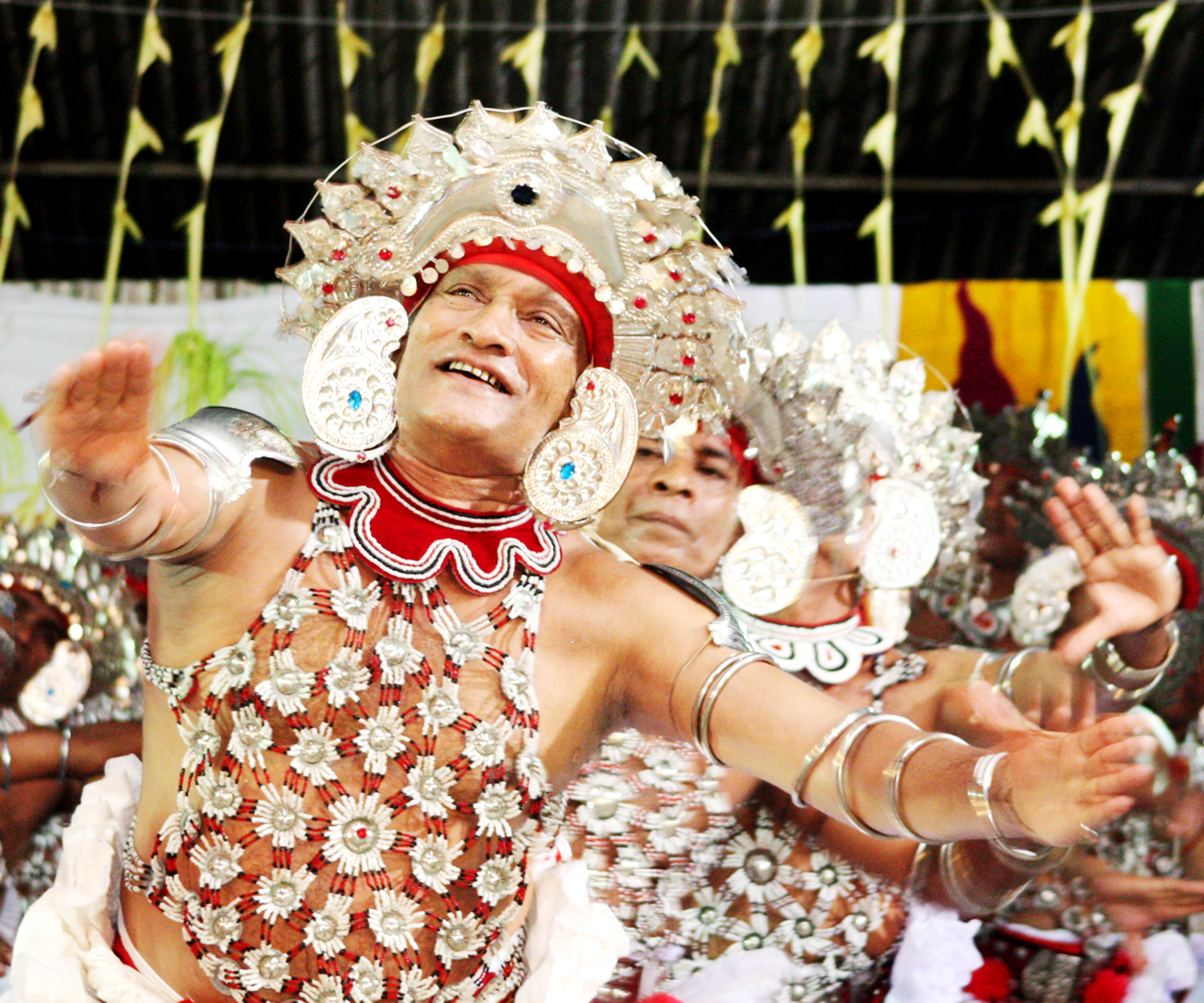
- Born: May 6, 1950; Mawanella, Sri Lanka
- Died: June 23, 2021 (aged 71); Mount-Lavinia, Sri Lanka
- Occupations: Dancer, choreographer
- Years active: 1964–2016
- Spouse: Nemali Amarasinghe
- Children: Rangana Ransilu Budawatta
- Parents: Punchi Guru Budawatta (father); Alpi Nona (mother)
- Relatives: Siridaru Gurunnanse (father's brother)
- Website: https://budawattaschoolofperformingarts.com/

Suneth Kulasiri Budawatta (Sinhala: කුලසිරි බුදවත්ත; 6 May 1950 – 23 June 2021), was a prominent Sri Lankan dancer and choreographer. Considered as one of the prominent traditional dancers of Sri Lanka, he has produced several leading choreographers to Sri Lankan dance in a career that spanned more than four decades. He was the founder of Budawatta School Of Performing Arts.

== Personal life ==
He was born on 6 May 1950 in Budawatta Gavilipitiya village in Aranayake, Mawanella, Sri Lanka as the seventh heir of Buddhawatta Dancing family of Satharakoralaya. His mother was P. N. Alpi Nona and father was Punchi Guru Budawatta. His father was one of the first three dance teachers in Sri Lanka where he taught in 14 schools. He later started the Budawatta Rajagiri Dancing Institute in 1957.

He has two brothers: Sunil Shantha, Jayantha Thilakasiri and one sister, Nandani. He was married to Nemali Amarasinghe, a fellow dancer. The couple had one son, Rangana Ransilu Budawatta who is an aeronautical engineer as well as a skilled drummer.

Budawatta had had serious health ailments since 2018. He died on 23 June 2021 at the age of 71.

== Career ==
Budawatta began dance lessons in early childhood in 1957, where he gained expertise in traditional dancing both up country and low country styles under his father. He also learned Kandyan dance from Siridaru Gurunnanse, his father's brother. In the meantime, he also developed his own style of traditional dancing with mixed styles. At the age of 15, he became a Ves dancer after excelling in Kandyan dancing. He has contributed to a number of dancing creations such as "Kinkini Koolam", "Nala Damayanthi" and "Nirthanjali" created at the Chithrasena Dancing Institute. In the meantime in 1970, he went on to pursue further academic education as a student at the Government College of Dance and Ballet called Haywood Institute. During this period, he was able to perform under renowned traditional dancer S. Panibharatha.

As soon as he left Haywood, he got the opportunity to work as a dancer in groups of famous dancers such as W. B. Makuloluwa, Chitrasena and Shesha Palihakkara. In 1974, he had the opportunity to dance as a member of the State Dance Troupe and tour around 40 countries with that. He went to 40 countries like Russia and Pakistan with the then Prime Minister, Sirimavo Bandaranaike with drama troupe. In 1983, he created a ballet called "Satana" based on a concept of Prime Minister Ranasinghe Premadasa. The ballet later toured to many countries such as Japan and Switzerland. Later in 1986, he started to teach dancing along with his wife, where he established Budawatta School Of Performing Arts. He first worked as a dance teacher at Gavilpitiya Central College and later taught in various schools until his retirement from Maradana Sangharaja College. In 1987, he made his first dance program "Rangana Ransilu" with his first batch of students of the Budawatta School.

Budawatta became an expert on "Kohomba Yak Kankarayia", the main essence of the Kandyan tradition. During this period, Kandyan dancing was centered on Perahera functions. However, he took many efforts to take the Kandyan dance tradition to the world with many dancing fusions. He started to preserve the traditional dance art at a time when the Kandyan dance tradition had been distorted for a long time and its value systems were gradually being destroyed. He is often known as 'Flying Buddhawatta', due to his floating dance strategies in the air above other dancers in Kandyan dancing.

Budawatta was the first Director of the Youth Dancing Troupe of the National Youth Services Council in Maharagama in 1980. Meanwhile, he also worked as the Director of the State Dancing Troupe. Some of his popular dancing students are Malini Fonseka, Suraj Mapa, Chandana Wickramasinghe, Upeka Gangodawila, Manjula Kumari, Jagath Chamila, Wimala Wickramarasuriya, Pannarasadi Ranasinghe, Rashmi Ravina, Anjali Budawatte, P. W. T. Diane, Channa Bulathsinhala, and Himali Gunasekara. In cinema as well as in the television media, he has contributed many creations to the field of Sri Lankan dance. He also made a dance composition for the song "Araliya Landata" sung by Nanda Malini.

== Filmography ==
Year	Film	Roles	Ref.
1998	Julietge Bhumikawa	actor	
2010	Tikiri Suwanda	choreographer	
2011	Mahindagamanaya	choreographer	
