= Faculties and institutions of University of Ruhuna =

Founding of the Faculties of the University of Ruhuna
Faculty	Year founded
Ruhuna University College	1978
Faculty of Humanities and Social Sciences	1978
Faculty of Agriculture	1978
Faculty of Science	1978
Faculty of Medicine	1980
Faculty of Engineering	1999
Faculty of Management and Finance	2003
Faculty of Fisheries and Marine Sciences and Technology	2005
Faculty of Graduate Studies	2011
Faculty of Technology	2017
Faculty of Allied Health Sciences	2017

The University of Ruhuna has ten faculties: Agriculture, Engineering, Fisheries and Marine Sciences & Technology, Humanities and Social Sciences, Management and Finance, Medicine, Science, Graduate studies, Technology and Allied Health Sciences.

The university has established two new faculties — 'Management and Finance' and 'Fisheries and Marine Science' — the first of its kind in Sri Lanka. Thus, the university has as many faculties as the University of Peradeniya, the largest in Sri Lanka.

The main campus is at Matara. The faculties of Engineering and Medicine are at Hapugala and Karapitiya, about 5 km from Galle city center. The Faculty of Agriculture is at Mapalana, 16 km north of Matara and 2 km south of Kamburupitiya.

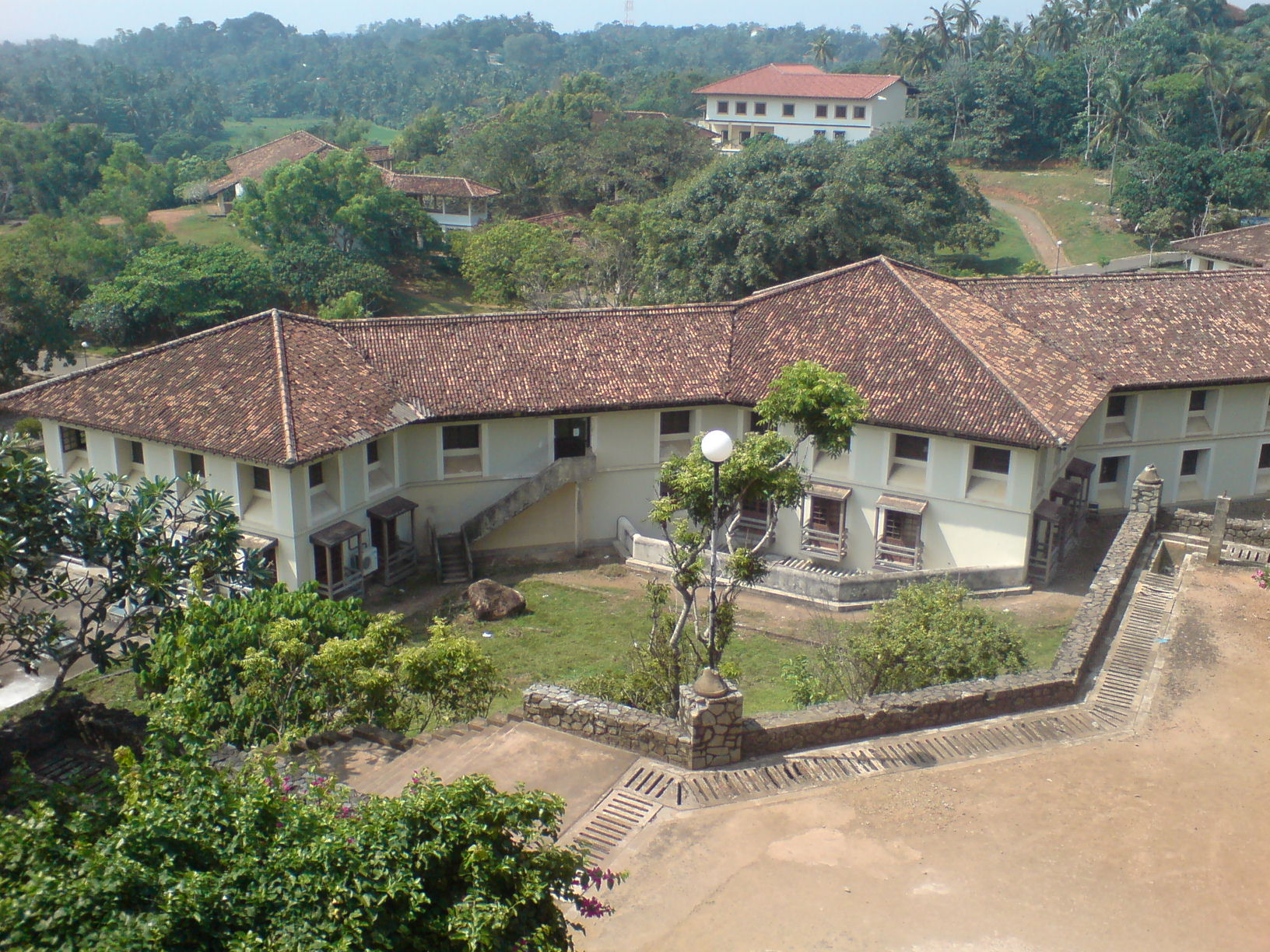
University Of Ruhuna

== Faculty of Agriculture ==
Faculty runs three BSc. degree programs; Agricultural Resource Management and Technology, Green, Technology, and Agribusiness management.

The following departments make up the Faculty of Agriculture:

- Department of Agricultural Engineering: Green technology
- Department of Agricultural Biology
- Department of Agricultural Economics: Agribusiness management
- Department of Animal Science
- Department of Food Science & Technology
- Department of Crop Science
- Department of Soil Science

== Faculty of Engineering ==
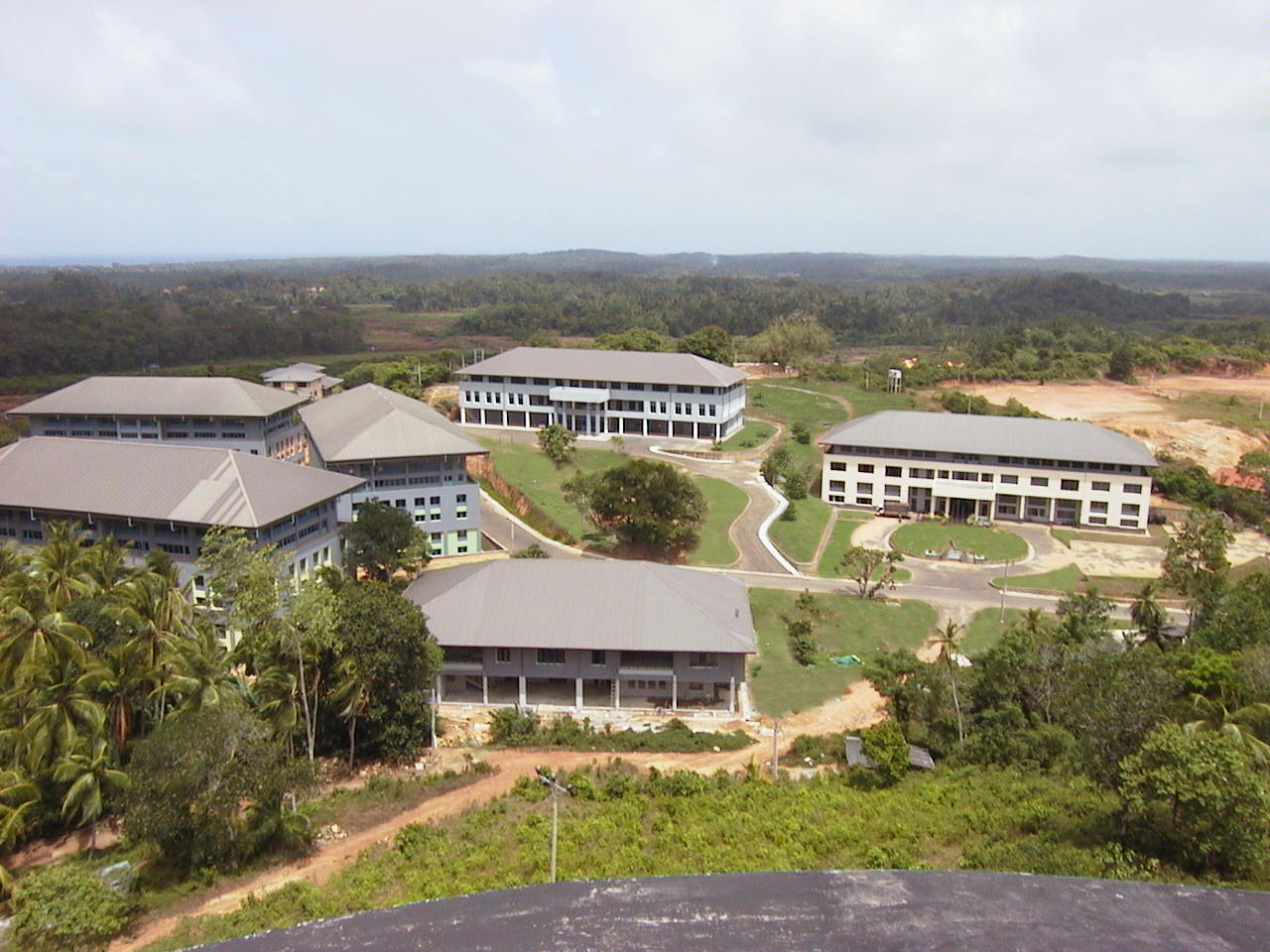
Faculty of engineering, Hapugala

The Faculty of Engineering is in Hapugala, Galle, outside of the city.

The following departments make up the Faculty of Engineering:

- Department of Civil and Environmental Engineering
- Department of Electrical and Information Engineering
- Department of Mechanical and Manufacturing Engineering
- Department of Interdisciplinary Studies

The curriculum at the Faculty of Engineering augments the engineering education with a due emphasis on Humanities, Social Engineering, and Management. It introduced the course unit system (semester system) among the faculties of Engineering in Sri Lanka.

The faculty was started in 1999 with 100 students. The first batch of students graduated in 2003. 1 July 1999 to 31 Dec. 1999 Professor Ratnajeevan Hoole (Professor of Electrical & Computer Engineering) chaired the “informal” Faculty Board that approved the complete syllabus for the faculty. Dr. H.H.J. Kirthisena was the first dean of the faculty and served from 1999 to 2001. Professor Lakshman Jayathilaka served as the second dean of the faculty from 2002 to 2003 and Dr. Kithsiri M. Liyange as the dean till 2007.

At present Dr. Chandana Perera serves as the dean. There are more than 800 students doing their studies in the faculty. In 2014, the intake was increased up to 225 per batch.

The faculty offers three bachelor's degree programs: Civil and Environmental Engineering, Electrical and Information Engineering, and Mechanical and Manufacturing Engineering.

=== Department of Electrical and Information Engineering ===
The Department of Electrical and Information Engineering offers Electrical, Electronic, Telecommunication, Computer and Information Engineering under one specialisation stream.

The department has three main laboratories: Electrical Machines and Power Electronic Laboratory, Electrical Measurements and Electronic Laboratory, and the Communication and System Engineering Laboratory. It is equipped with a separate computer resource center for specialized applications and research.

Dr. S.H.K.K Gunawickrama serves as the head of the department. The department has four senior lecturers and thirteen lecturers. Most of the academic staff are on study leave doing their post-graduate degrees.

=== Department of Mechanical and Manufacturing Engineering ===
The department of Mechanical and Manufacturing Engineering offers Mechanical Engineering, Manufacturing Engineering(Production Engineering), Automobile Technology, Computer aided Designing and Engineering, Control and Robotics Engineering, and other technological specialties under one specialisation stream.

Department research activities are offered at the undergraduate and post-graduate level.

The department has five main laboratories: Materials and Metallurgy Laboratory, Thermodynamics and Energy Laboratory, Fluid Mechanics and Process Engineering Laboratory, Applied Mechanics and Automobile Engineering Laboratory, and the Control, Automation, and CAD/CAM Laboratory. There is also an Engineering Workshop for graduate training in the use of industrial instruments. The department is equipped with a separate Computer Laboratory for CAD/CAM activities.

Dr. S. Baduge serves as the head of the department, which consists of five senior lecturers and seven lecturers. Most of the academic staff members are on study leave doing their post-graduate degrees.

=== Department of Civil and Environmental Engineering ===
The department of Civil and Environmental Engineering offers Structural Engineering and Construction Material, Geotechnical and Geoenvironmental Engineering, Water and Environmental Engineering, Infrastructure Development and Management and other technological specialties under one specialisation stream.

== Faculty of Fisheries and Marine Sciences and Technology ==
The following departments make up the Faculty of Fisheries and Marine Sciences and Technology:

- Department of Oceanography and Marine Geology
- Department of Limnology and Water Technology
- Department of Fisheries & Aquaculture

== Faculty of Humanities and Social Sciences ==
The Faculty of Humanities and Social Sciences offers 421 courses in 8 departments (Department of English and Linguistics being the newest addition) with 104 full-time academic staff members. These courses are designed to give the undergraduates a broad understanding of the transitions that operate in a wide range of humanistic and social science disciplines. The faculty has the largest student intake of the university. Currently, the faculty caters to 16,337 students. The students get selected to the faculty based on their performance at the General Certificate Examination (Advanced Level) of the relevant year. The selection is done by the University Grants Commission of Sri Lanka. The faculty offers a three year Bachelor of Arts general degree and a B.A special degree of four years. At the beginning of their first academic year, undergraduates are offered an intensive English programme and a programme to enhance their computer literacy to improve their performances in academic work. The ongoing courses on General English and Computer Studies are designed to continue this support throughout the three year degree programme.

The faculty offers postgraduate degree programmes from M.A. to PhD. level.

The faculty of Humanities and Social sciences aims at enhancing the silks of undergraduates to apply their theoretical knowledge in solving real life problems in the contemporary world.

The following departments make up the Faculty of Humanities and Social Sciences:

- Department of Information Technology
- Department of Public Policy
- Department of Economics
- Department of Geography
- Department of History
- Department of Pali & Buddhist Studies
- Department of Sinhala
- Department of Sociology
- Department of English

== Faculty of Medicine ==
The Faculty of Medicine, University of Ruhuna is in Karapitiya, Galle. It is the only medical school in the Southern part of Sri Lanka.

It was established in 1980. It offers MBBS degree program and three Allied Health Sciences degree programmes — Bachelor of Science in Nursing, Bachelor of Science in Medical Laboratory Science and Bachelor of Pharmacy. There are over 125 full-time academic staff members in the faculty covering all the disciplines. In addition, the specialist staff of the Teaching Hospital, Karapitiya are working as extended faculty staff in teaching undergraduates. The Karapitiya Teaching Hospital, a well-known tertiary care hospital in the country, which serves as the main clinical training institute Faculty of Medicine of the University of Ruhuna.

It caters for postgraduate students in medicine and other related fields.

It is recognised as a training centre by the Postgraduate Institute of Medicine, of the University of Colombo. Faculty of Medicine, University of Ruhuna attracts a considerable number of medical students to follow elective appointments, from many countries, particularly from European countries like Germany and United Kingdom.

The following departments make up the Faculty of Medicine:

- Department of Anatomy
- Department of Biochemistry
- Department of Physiology
- Department of Parasitology
- Department of Microbiology
- Department of Pharmacology
- Department of Pathology
- Department of Forensic Medicine
- Department of Community Medicine
- Department of Medicine
- Department of Surgery
- Department of Paediatrics
- Department of Psychiatry
- Department of Gynaecology & Obstetrics

== Faculty of Science ==
The following departments make up the Faculty of Science:

- Department of Botany
- Department of Chemistry
- Department of Computer Science
- Department of Mathematics
- Department of Physics
- Department of Zoology

At present, the faculty recruits 150 students for the Biological Science, 210 students for the Physical Science and 50 students for the Computer Science streams for every academic year. The selection of students for undergraduate courses is done by the University Grants Commission of Sri Lanka, based on the performance of students in the relevant General Certificate Examination (Advanced Level).

The faculty offers primarily undergraduate courses viz. the Bachelor of Science (B.Sc.) General Degree and Bachelor of Computer Science (BCS) General Degree of three–year duration and B.Sc. and BCS Special Degrees of four-year duration. The undergraduate programme consists of a large number, of course, units offered by individual departments.

The faculty offers postgraduate degree programmes leading to the M.Sc., M.Phil, and Ph.D.

The Faculty of Science offers a Foundation programme, which offers course units on English (Intensive Course), Skills in Common Disciplines, and National Heritage, among others. This programme is provided as a preparation to the Bachelor of Science Degree and is mandatory. This programme carries three non-degree credits.

The Faculty of Science consists of six departments: Botany, Chemistry, Computer Science, Mathematics, Physics, and Zoology.

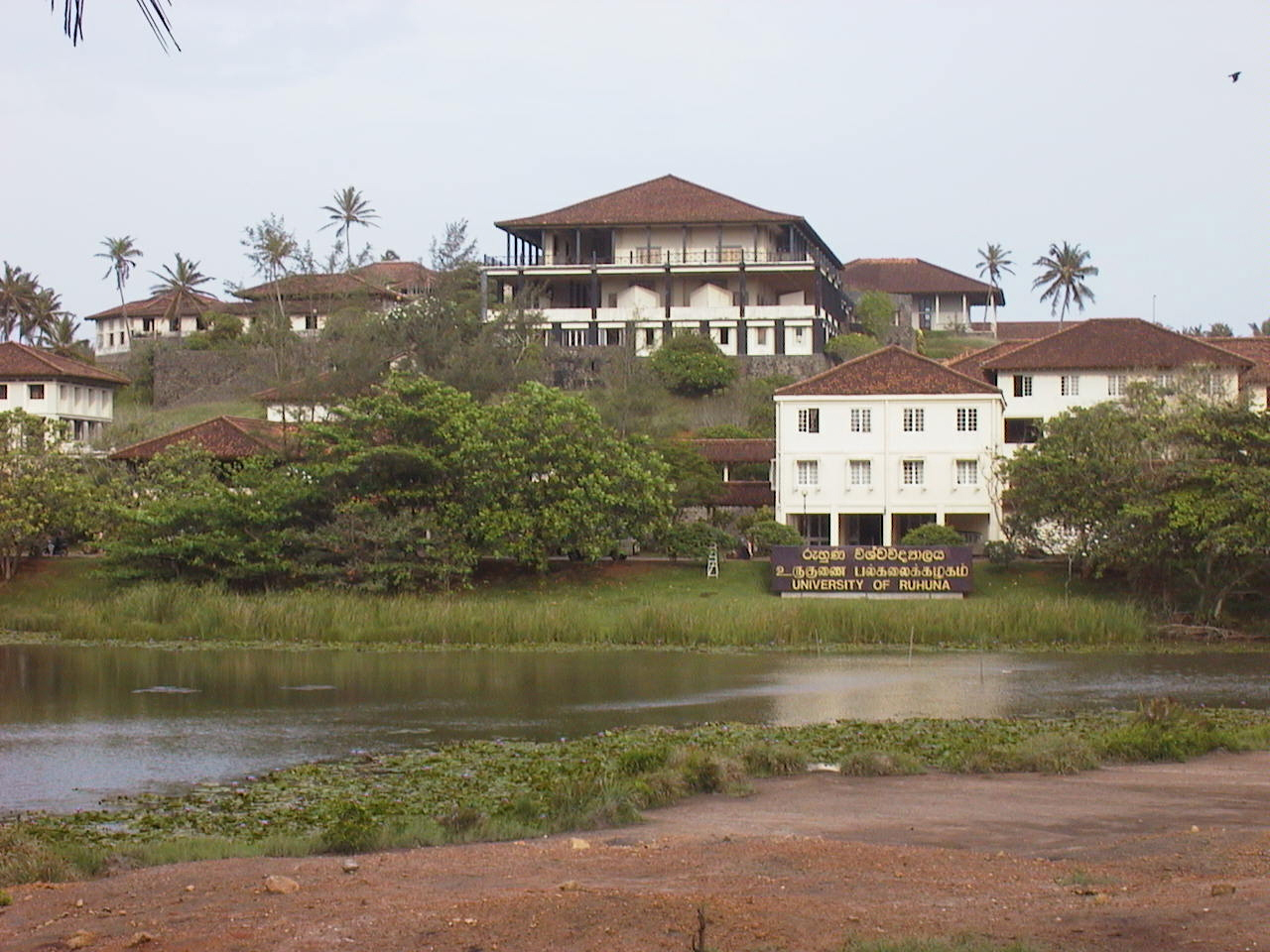
The University of Ruhuna, Northern hill

=== Department of Computer Science ===
The Computer Unit was established more than thirty years ago and The Department of Computer Science of the University of Ruhuna was established in 1997 fulfilling a long-standing need of the university. The Department of Computer Science and the Computer Unit are functioning as a common body to achieve their goals. The Department of Computer Science, established in 1997, was the first computer science department established in a Sri Lankan university.

The Department of Computer Science offers two main degree programs. The Bachelor of Computer Science (BCSc) degree program is an outcome of an enormous effort of the staff of the Department of Computer Science. One of the prime objectives of this degree programme is to prepare the undergraduates for a career in Computer Science and Information Technology, which is one of the major driving forces of the economic development of Sri Lanka. Students admitted to the program will pursue a full-scale Computer Science programme of three years leading to the degree of Bachelor of Computer Science (General). Based on the performance, a limited number of students will be selected to study an extra year leading to the degree of Bachelor of Computer Science (Special). One of the prime objectives of the special degree is to offer in-depth knowledge in selected areas of computer science for those who wish to pursue an academic and/or research careers.

The department also offers a BSc in Computer Science to Physical Science students who are following a Bachelor of Science degree program. The duration of the Bachelor of Science (General) Degree Course is three academic years (six semesters).

== Faculty of Technology ==
The Faculty of Technology has been officially established under the gazette notification issued on 26.04. 2016. The new faculty will be located at Kamburupitiya, close to the Faculty of Agriculture, however, it will be temporarily located at the premises of Faculty of Science until the buildings, which are under construction, are completed.

The students will be admitted in 2016 for two-degree programmes, Bachelor of Engineering Technology (BET) and Bachelor of Information and Communication Technology (BICT). The students for Bachelor of BioSystem Technology (BBST) degree will be admitted in the following year. The total student intake would be 200 for the Faculty when it is fully established. The following departments make up the Faculty of Technology:

- Department of Engineering Technology.
- Department of Information and Communication Technology.
- Department of Bio Systems Technology.
- Department of Multidisciplinary studies.
