= Mrs. Sri Lanka 2021 controversy =

Incident during pageant finale

The Mrs. Sri Lanka 2021 controversy refers to an incident that happened on the night of 4 April 2021, during the grand finale of the Mrs. Sri Lanka pageant in Colombo, Sri Lanka. The competition ended in bizarre fashion when Pushpika De Silva, who was initially crowned as Mrs. Sri Lanka 2021, unceremoniously had her crown forcibly removed from her head on stage by the previous title holder, Caroline Jurie, who stated that De Silva should be disqualified for being a divorcee, something De Silva denied. The incident sparked social media reaction and wide media attention. De Silva was reinstated as the legitimate winner of the Mrs. Sri Lanka 2021 competition and therefore was eligible to compete at the Mrs. World 2021 pageant.

== Events ==
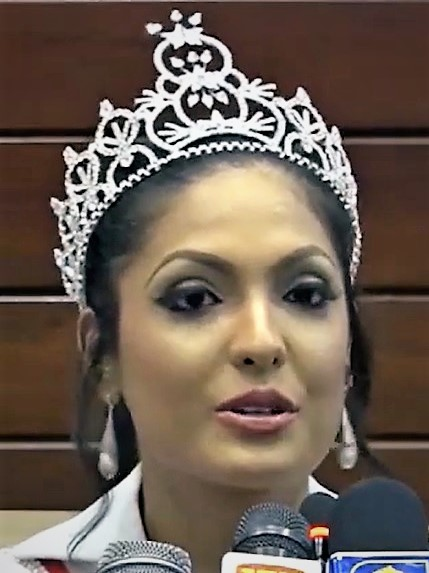
Mrs. World 2020 Caroline Jurie became subject of controversy after unceremoniously stripping off the crown from Pushpika De Silva.

On the night of 4 April 2021, the grand finale of the Mrs. Sri Lanka 2021 pageant was held at the Nelum Pokuna Mahinda Rajapaksa Theatre in Colombo. The event was partially telecast live via Rupavahini, which is one of Sri Lanka's main national television channels.

During the grand finale, contestant number 20, Pushpika De Silva was crowned by the judging panel as the winner of the Mrs. Sri Lanka 2021 beauty pageant. She was crowned by Caroline Jurie, the reigning Mrs. World 2020 and Mrs. Sri Lanka 2020. However, moments after officially announcing the winner of the competition, Jurie rushed to the stage. With microphone in hand, she declared that there is a rule about being married and not divorced, and that she was taking the first steps in saying that the crown goes to the first runner up. She then proceeded to snatch the crown from De Silva and put it on the head of the first runner-up, Ashya Basnayaka. Following the incident, De Silva left the stage in tears, causing outcry and confusion among the public. De Silva reportedly suffered injuries to her head when Jurie forcibly removed her crown.

== Aftermath ==
De Silva stated on her Facebook account that she was recovering from head injuries after being hospitalised and denied claims that she was a divorcee. It was reported that De Silva was separated from her partner for personal reasons. She threatened legal action against those who insulted her during the incident. The organisers of the Mrs. Sri Lanka event apologised for the incident and ensured that the crown and cash prize would be presented back to De Silva. On 6 April 2021, the organisers returned the crown and prize to De Silva and issued an apology regarding the controversy.

Mrs. World Inc. indicated that it deeply regretted Jurie's conduct and warned of investigations to determine possible actions against Jurie.

After the incident, De Silva's husband stated in a Facebook post that he had not been involved with her for the past four years and they were finalizing their divorce. The Daily Mirror said that De Silva's case had been fixed in court for June or July 2021.

On 8 April 2021, Caroline Jurie and runner-up Chula Padmendra were arrested by the police and questioned. They were arrested based on three separate counts. However, both of them were released on bail later on the same day.

After being released on bail, Jurie posted an Instagram video in which she defended her decision and mentioned that she is ready to pass on her Mrs. World crown.

Chula Padmendra mentioned in an interview that there were no auditors and translators in the Mrs. Sri Lanka 2021 pageant, and not all contestants were treated equally on stage due to a favoritism scandal as seen by witnesses and other evidence. She said the scandal was to be presented in an upcoming court case in regards to the incident.

The Mrs World organization announced later in April that Kate Schneider from Ireland, who was the first runner-up when Jurie won the title, was the winner following Jurie's voluntary resignation as Mrs. World. Jurie remained as a former Mrs. World and was listed in the official booklet of Mrs World 2022.

Pushpika De Silva was officially stripped of her title on 8 February 2022 on grounds of 'serious violation of the discipline and the ethical standards expected of a beauty queen.'
