= Matara Central College =

- Matara; Sri Lanka

Information
- Type: Mixed Government School
- Motto: අපි ඔබේ ජීවය වෙමු (We shall be your life)
- Established: 1932; 94 years ago
- Grades: 6–13
- Enrollment: Over 3000
- Language: Sinhala ,English
- Colors: Blue and white
- Website: www.mrcentralcollege.sch.lk

Matara Central College (MCC) (Sinhala: මාතර මධ්‍ය විද්‍යාලය) is a government school for boys and girls in Matara. It is situated in Southern province, Sri Lanka.

== History ==
Matara Central College was Established in 1932. It was populated as central college and now it is established as a National School under category of the Ministry of Education, Sri Lanka.

== School Flag ==
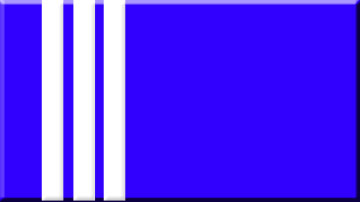

The school colors are blue and white.

== Matara Central College Today ==
Today, Matara Central College has over 3000 students. The school's employees include the principal, six deputy principals, and 130 teachers.

Matara District

== Past Principals ==
Principal	Time Period
Mr. B. Chanrasena	1932.01.01 – 1933.07.02
Mr. C. Silva	1933.07.03 – 1937.05.02
Mr. D.C. Hewavitharana	1937.05.03 – 1939.05.03
Mr. J.P.C. Abyakoon	1939.05.04 – 1948.09.01
Mr. D. Deevasurendra	1948.09.02 – 1948.11.02
Mr. G.C.S. Veerasuriya	1948.11.03 – 1952.11.02
Mr. F.D. Nagahawatta	1952.11.03 – 1961.01.01
Mr. H.G. Ganathilaka	1961.01.02 – 1970.10.01
Mr. J.P.Samarasinhla	1970.10.02 – 1973.09.19
Mrs.Wicramathilaka	1973.09.20 – 1975.12.31
Mr. S.H. Kumarasingha	1976.01.01 – 1978.02.09
Mr. C. Senaweera	1978.02.10 – 1988.02.04
Mr. R.B. Piyasena	1988.02.05 – 1996.12.05
Mr. K.A. Somapala	1996.12.06 – 2006.07.05
Mr. L.G.S. Yaapa	2006.07.06 – 2007.07.14
Rev. A. Gunarathana Thero	2007.07.15 – 2009.10.26
Mr. R.M. Premathilaka	2009.10.27 – Now

== Sports ==
- Athletics
- Chess
- Cricket
- Volleyball
- Karate
- Rugby
- Wushu

== College Houses ==
College Houses' names and colors:

- Sathya :gree
- Maithree : Red
- Shanthi : Yellow
- Veerya : Green
