= Sandahiru Seya =

Sandahiru Seya සදහිරු සෑය
- Location in Sri Lanka

Religion
- Affiliation: Theravada Buddhism

Location
- Country: Sri Lanka
- Interactive map of Sandahiru Seya සදහිරු සෑය
- Coordinates: 8°20′18.2″N 80°23′38.5″E

Architecture
- Founder: Mahinda Rajapaksa
- Completed: 2021
- Height (max): 86

Sandahiru Seya is a second largest hemispherical stupa in Sri Lanka located in Anuradhapura.

== History ==
The stupa was built in commemoration of the fallen war heroes of the Sri Lanka Armed Forces in Sri Lankan Civil War which was ended in 2009.

The foundation stone was laid by President Mahinda Rajapaksa on 22 November 2010. The work was completed and the stupa was opened by President Gotabaya Rajapaksa and Prime Minister Mahinda Rajapaksa on 18 November 2021.

This is the largest dagoba built in Sri Lanka after the construction of the Jethavanaramaya in Anuradhapura by King Mahasen in AD 301. The pagoda's structural completion was carried out with the support of hundreds of Army, Navy, Air Force, Police and Civil Security Department personnel of respective security establishments. The stupa is 86.1 m (282.5 ft) high and 240 metres (800 ft) in circumference. Stupa houses the sacred relics including the Kapilavastu relics. The height of the Crest Gem placed in the dagoba is 1.1 m (3.5 ft). There are 1895 gemstones, inlaid with gold as well as pearls.

== Gallery ==
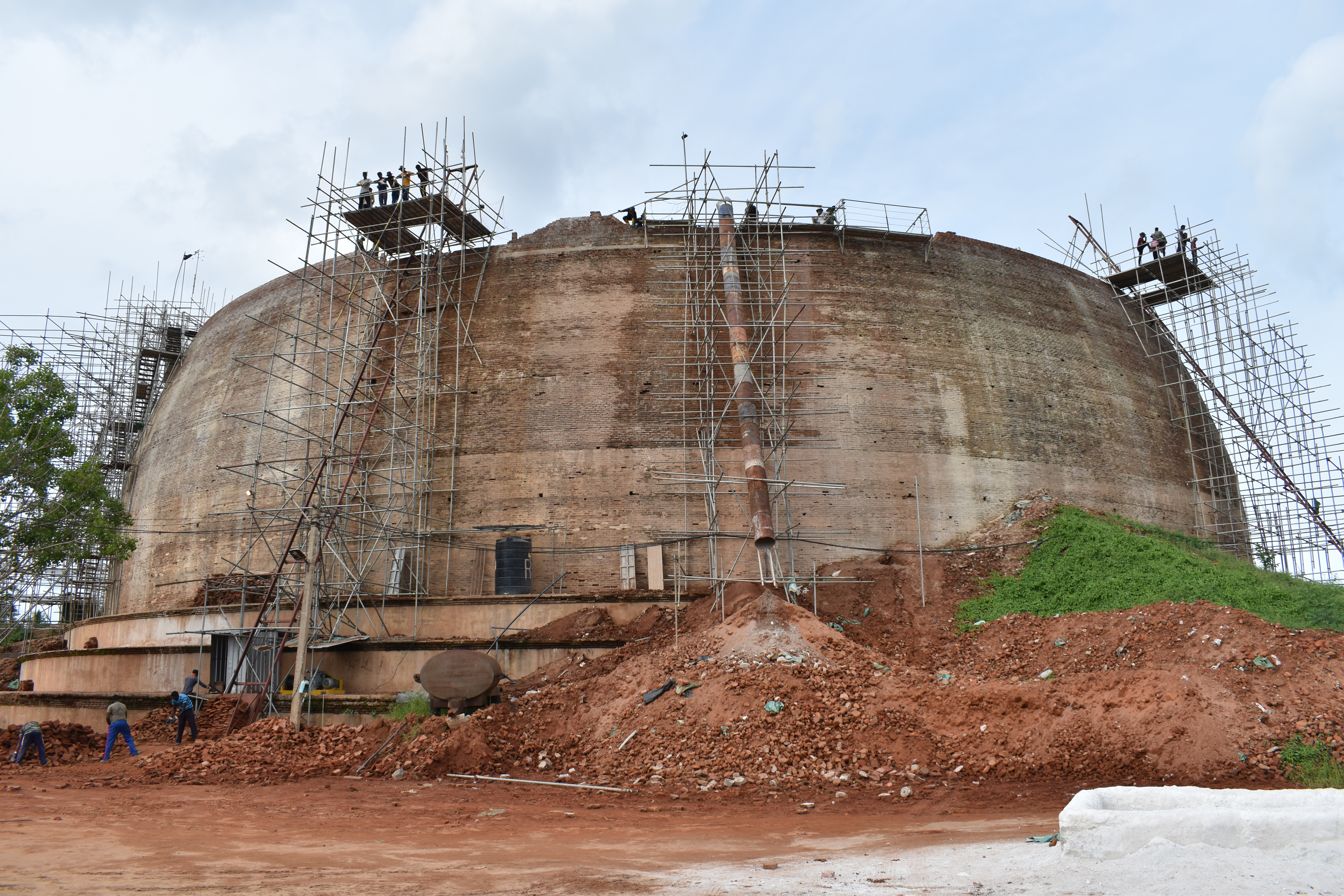
Sandahiru Seya under construction in 2018

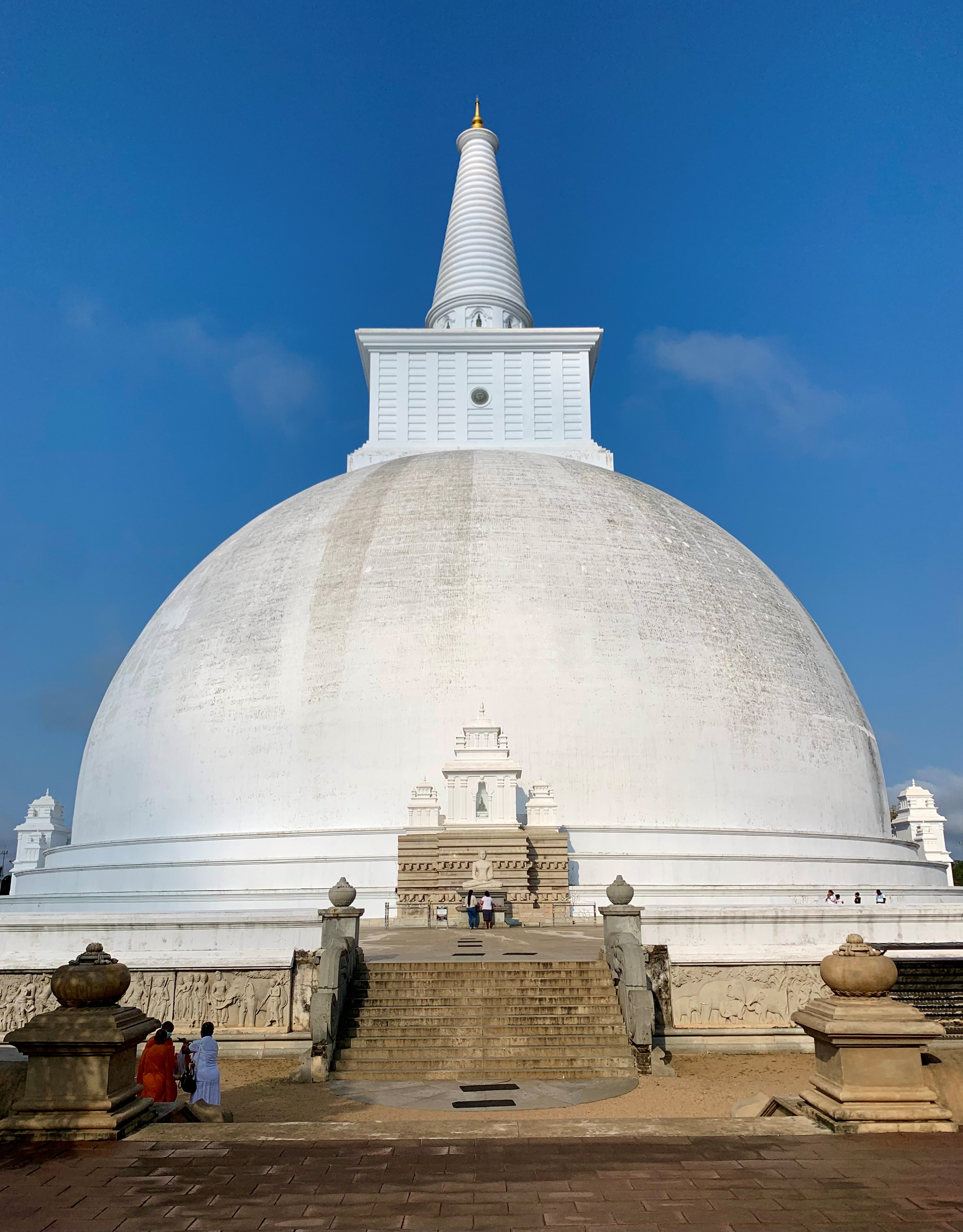
Sandahiru Seya in 2026

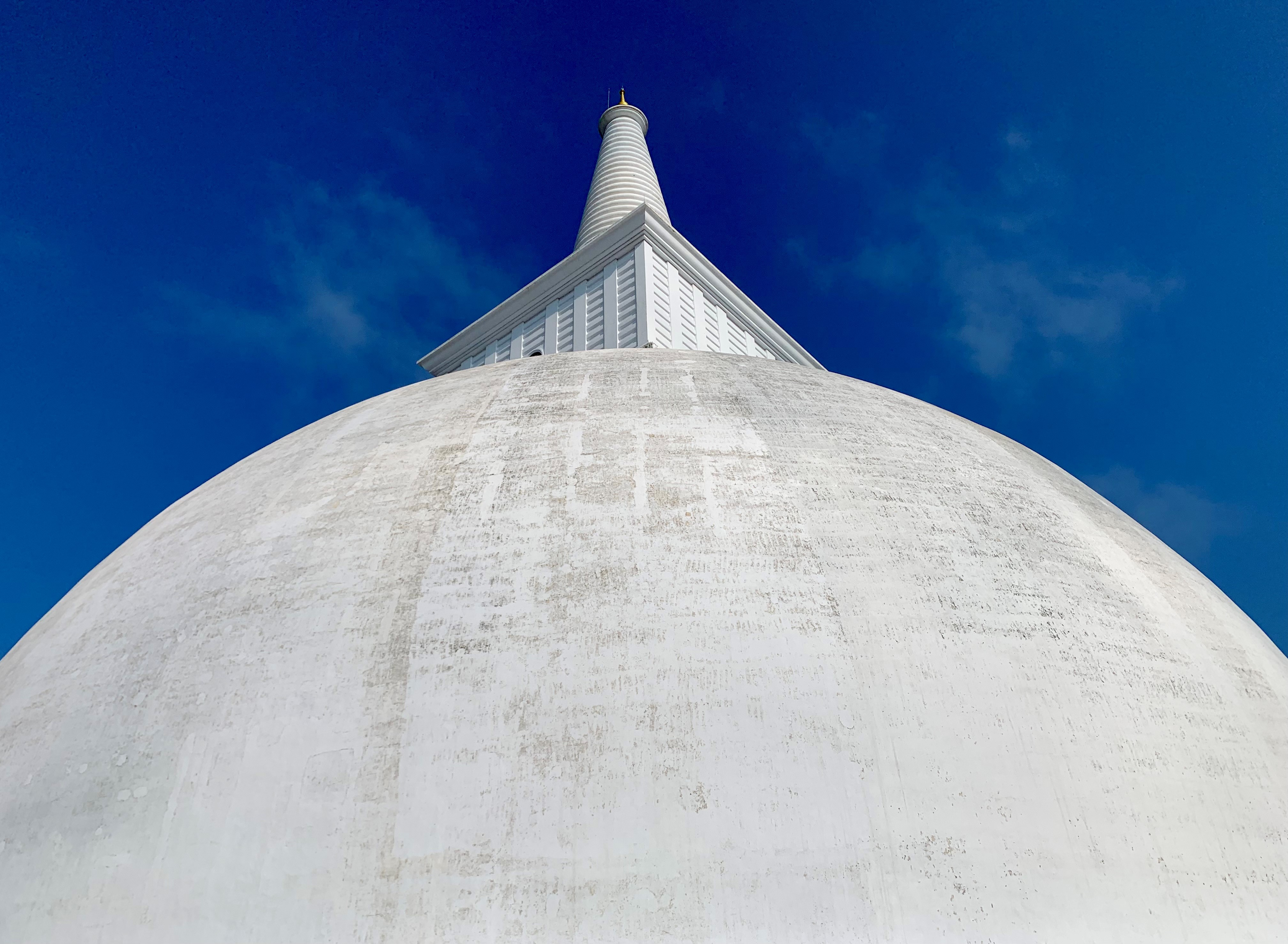
Details
