= Elmo Rodrigopulle =

Sri Lankan cricketer and journalist (1941–2021)

- එල්මෝ රොද්‍රිගොපුල්ලේ
- Born: 18 July 1941; Ceylon
- Died: 20 July 2021 (aged 80); Colombo National Hospital, Colombo, Sri Lanka
- Occupations: cricketer, journalist

Elmo Rodrigopulle (18 July 1941 – 20 July 2021) was a Sri Lankan cricketer and sports journalist. He served as a sports journalist mainly covering cricket for various newspapers in career spanning about 52 years. He was widely acclaimed for his sports columns and was renowned for his work covering cricket in all Test cricket–playing nations, excluding Afghanistan and Ireland.

== Career ==
He pursued his primary and secondary education at the St. Benedict's College and went on to play cricket representing the school. He also went on to captain St. Benedict's College cricket team in 1960. He represented Tamil Union Cricket and Athletic Club, Burgher Recreation Club and Saracens Sports Club in domestic cricket. He was a regular feature for Saracens SC in Sara Trophy tournament. Elmo also played for Ceylon Board President's XI which was captained by Michael Tissera in a match against Hong Kong in 1971. However, he was never close enough to gain national callup to the team.

He received his diploma in journalism from the Institute for Journalism, West Berlin in 1976 and he also obtained a doctorate in philosophy from Medicina Alternativa, which was attached to the Open University. After his retirement from playing cricket, he pursued his career as a journalist covering various cricket matches and other sports events. He became the first Sri Lankan journalist to have witnessed the Sri Lankan team playing overseas Test series for the first time after gaining Test status from the International Cricket Council in 1981 when Sri Lanka toured Pakistan to play a three match test series. He also notably covered two Olympic events as a sports journalist touring Germany for the 1972 Summer Olympics and touring Russia for the 1980 Summer Olympics.

His first stint as a newspaper editor was for the Times of Ceylon and Daily Mirror. He later joined Daily News as a sports editor in 1987 before becoming its consultant editor. He later became an associate editor of Sunday Observer. In addition, he also served as a correspondent for Cricinfo and wrote cricket commentaries for the website related to the international cricket matches featuring Sri Lanka. He was also noted for his commentary during an ODI match between India and Sri Lanka in 1997 where he wrote to Cricinfo, "it was a mockery on the umpiring fraternity and what umpiring stands for" referring to the standing umpire Raman Sharma's decision for not adjudging Ajay Jadeja to be dismissed despite raising his hand for an lbw appeal from the Sri Lankan fielders.

In 2013, he was honored by the Sri Lanka Cricket with the Outstanding Achievement Award during the Dialog Awards. In 2019, he received the prestigious Presidential Lifetime Achievement Award of Excellence for his contributions in the field of sport.

== Death ==
He died on 20 July 2021 at the Colombo National Hospital, two days after his 80th birthday. Prior to his death, he was still serving as an associate editor of the Sunday Observer.
