= Kapila Athukorala =

Sri Lankan politician

Hon. Kapila Athukorala MP
- කපිල අතුකොරල கபில அத்துகோரள

Member of the Parliament of Sri Lanka
- Incumbent
- Assumed office 2020
- Constituency: Trincomalee District

Personal details
- Born: Athukoralalage Pelawatthe Kapila Nuwan Athukorala
- Party: Sri Lanka Podujana Peramuna
- Other political affiliations: Sri Lanka People's Freedom Alliance

Athukoralalage Pelawatthe Kapila Nuwan Athukorala is a Sri Lankan politician and Member of Parliament.

Athukorala contested the 2015 parliamentary election as one of the United People's Freedom Alliance (UPFA) electoral alliance's candidates in Trincomalee District but failed to get elected after coming 3rd amongst the UPFA candidates. He contested the 2020 parliamentary election as a Sri Lanka People's Freedom Alliance electoral alliance candidate in Trincomalee District and was elected to the Parliament of Sri Lanka.

Electoral history of Kapila Athukorala
Election	Constituency	Party	Alliance	Votes	Result
2015 parliamentary	Trincomalee District		United People's Freedom Alliance	14,242	Not elected
2020 parliamentary	Trincomalee District	Sri Lanka Podujana Peramuna	Sri Lanka People's Freedom Alliance	30,056	Elected
