= Chandrishan Perera =

Sri Lankan rugby union player (1961–2021)

- Born: 12/29/1961
- Died: 24 October 2021 (aged approximately 60) Negombo, Western Province, Sri Lanka
- School: St. Peter's College, Colombo; Mill Hill School
- University: University of Essex

Rugby union career
Senior career
Years	Team	Apps	(Points)
1979	Colombo Hockey and Football Club		
International career
Years	Team	Apps	(Points)
- Sri Lanka
National sevens team
Years	Team		Comps
1979-1994	Sri Lanka		

Chandrishan Perera also spelt as Chandrashan Perera (29 December 1961 – 24 October 2021) was a Sri Lankan rugby union player, coach, commentator, journalist, lawyer and administrator who also served as former captain of the national side. He represented Sri Lanka rugby sevens side from 1979 to 1994 in the position of winger. He was nicknamed as Shan.

== Early life ==
He pursued his primary education up until Grade 5 at the St. Peter's College, Bambalapititya before moving to England to complete his primary and secondary education at the Mill Hill School in London.

== Career ==
After leaving the school, he graduated with a degree in Criminology and Law from the University of Essex in England. He also went on to play first-class cricket during his stay in England and was a regular player for University of Essex.

He later returned to his native country Sri Lanka in 1979 to pursue and prolong his career in rugby. He joined Colombo Hockey and Football Club in 1979 and he soon became a household name in Sri Lanka among rugby fans due to his exploits playing A division rugby for Colombo Hockey and Football Club.

He was also a vital member of the Sri Lankan Tuskers side which won the Bowl Championship defeating Papua New Guinea in the final of the 1984 Hong Kong Sevens. During the 1984 Hong Kong Sevens, he was involved in a bizarre moment when he attempted to tackle Australian winger David Campese just 60 metres away from the try line which also prompted David to vent his frustration on him. He was also a crucial member of the Colombo Hockey and Football Club which surprisingly reached the final of the 1984 Singapore Cricket Club International Rugby Sevens and New Zealand Forces edged past CH & FC in a close thriller by 21-16 in the final. He captained Sri Lanka to historic triumph at the 1994 Fiji Invitation Sevens where Sri Lanka outclassed Uruguay by 21-14 in the final. It remains the best achievement by Sri Lanka in rugby sevens and Chandrishan remains as the only captain for Sri Lanka to have won the Fiji Sevens.

He also ran his own training rugby school and an advertising company named Sharky's sport advertising. He also served as rugby national team selector, executive director of Sri Lanka Rugby Football Union and also volunteered as a fitness trainer for the Sri Lanka men's national cricket team in 1992. Sri Lanka would go onto win the 1996 Cricket World Cup defeating mighty Australia in the final and Chandrishan was highly praised for his efforts in uplifting the fitness standards of Sri Lankan national cricket team which was evident with Sri Lanka's World Cup triumph. He also transformed fitness and professional levels of some of the most important cricketers including Arjuna Ranatunga and Aravinda de Silva.

He was appointed by Thilanga Sumathipala to head Sri Lanka Cricket's first ever media unit which was launched in 1999. While being the media manager of Sri Lanka Cricket, he also spearheaded a humanitarian project called "Cricket Aid" in 2004 which was carried out in order to help the families affected by the 2004 tsunami. He was reappointed media manager of Sri Lanka Cricket in 2016. He also involved in many motivational programmes to uplift the University of Moratuwa although he was not an alma mater of the university.

== Later years and death ==
Despite being known for his physical intensity, his health began deteriorating in 2018 as he was diagnosed with Parkinson's disease. He began using a wheelchair.

A local domestic rugby match between Colombo Origins and Outstation Origins was organized in April 2019 at the Havelock Sports Club Ground as a fundraiser for Chandrishan in order to raise funds for his medical expenses.

He died on 24 October 2021 at the age of 60 in Negombo.

== Honours ==
He received the Life Time Award of Excellence with the prestigious title "Kreeda Bhushuna" at the 2019 Presidential Awards.

== See also ==
- Rugby union in Sri Lanka
