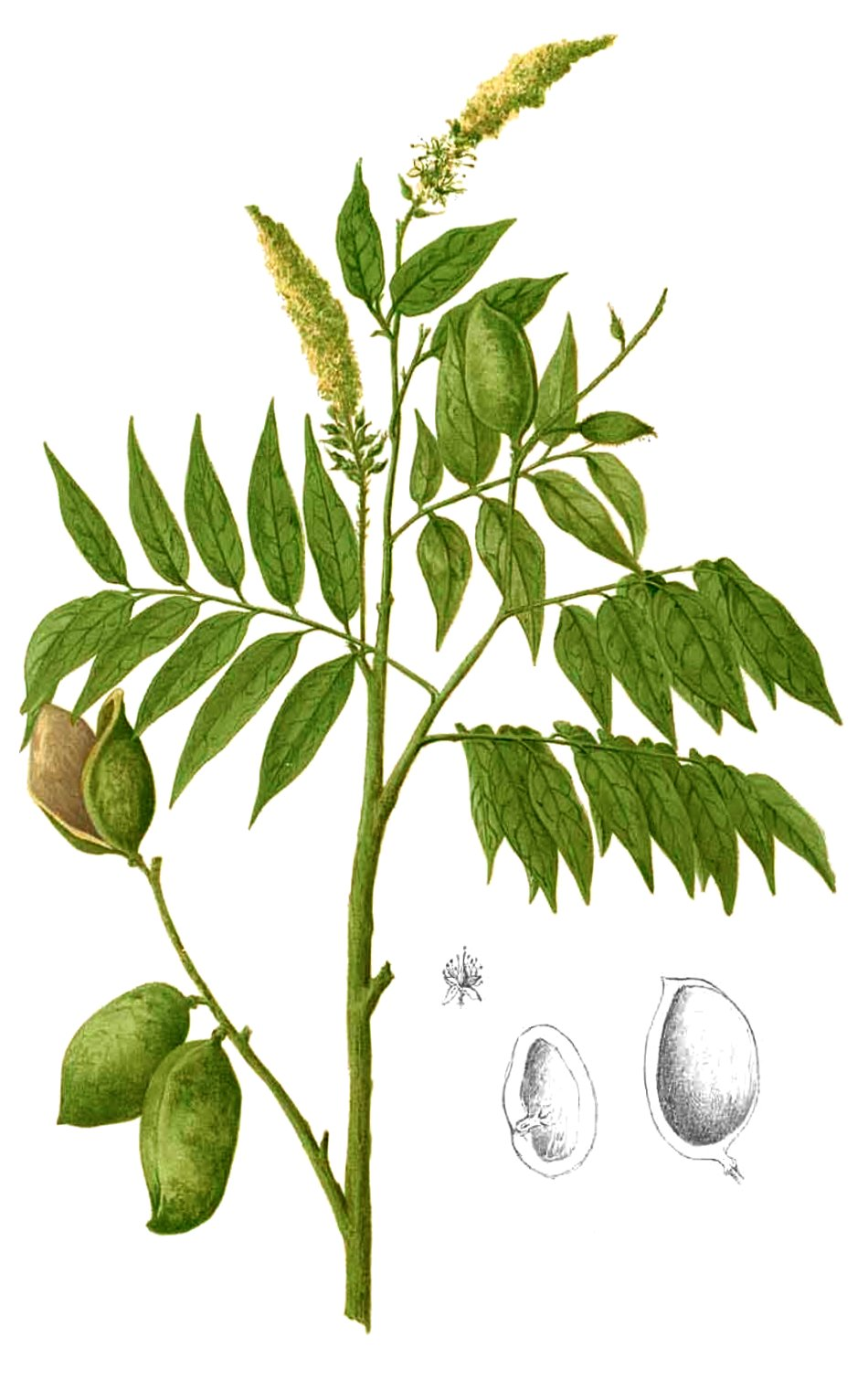
- Crudia blancoi

Scientific classification
- Kingdom: Plantae
- Clade: Tracheophytes
- Clade: Angiosperms
- Clade: Eudicots
- Clade: Rosids
- Order: Fabales
- Family: Fabaceae
- Subfamily: Detarioideae
- Tribe: Amherstieae
- Genus: Crudia; Schreb.

Synonyms
- List: Apalatoa Aubl.; Cyclas Schreb.; Opalatoa Aubl.; Pryona Miq.; Touchiroa Aubl.; Tuchiroa Kuntze; Waldschmidtia Scop.

= Crudia =

Genus of legumes

Crudia is a genus of plants in the family Fabaceae.

== Species ==
The following species are accepted in the genus Crudia:

- Crudia abbreviata A.R.Bean
- Crudia acuminata Benth.
- Crudia aequalis Ducke
- Crudia amazonica Spruce ex Benth.
- Crudia aromatica (Aubl.) Forsyth f.
- Crudia balachandrae Sanjappa
- Crudia bantamensis (Hassk.) Benth.
- Crudia blancoi Rolfe
- Crudia bracteata Benth.
- Crudia caudata Prain
- Crudia cauliflora Merr.
- Crudia curtisii Prain
- Crudia cynometroides Hosok.
- Crudia gabonensis Pierre ex Harms
- Crudia glaberrima (Steud.) J.F.Macbr.
- Crudia gracilis Prain
- Crudia harmsiana De Wild.
- Crudia humboldtiana Stergios
- Crudia klainei Pierre ex De Wild.
- Crudia laurentii De Wild.
- Crudia ledermannii Harms
- Crudia letouzeyi Breteler & Nguema
- Crudia liberica Breteler & Nguema
- Crudia michelsonii J.Léonard
- Crudia oblonga Benth.
- Crudia ornata de Wit
- Crudia papuana Kosterm.
- Crudia penduliflora Ridl.
- Crudia senegalensis Planch. ex Benth.
- Crudia spicata (Aubl.) Forsyth f.
- Crudia splendens de Wit
- Crudia tenuipes Merr.
- Crudia tomentosa (Aubl.) J.F.Macbr.
- Crudia viridiflora Whitmore
- Crudia wrayi Prain
- Crudia zenkeri Harms
- Crudia zeylanica (Thwaites) Benth.
