= Willy Gamage =

Sri Lankan governor

Willie Gamage served as the governor of Southern Province of Sri Lanka.
