= Kirinda =

- Village
- Interactive map of Kirinda
- Country: Sri Lanka
- Province: Southern Province
- Time zone: UTC+5:30 (Sri Lanka Standard Time)

Kirinda is a town in Sri Lanka. It is located in the Southern Province.

Kirinda was founded as a Malay settlement and as a result, Sri Lankan Malays form the majority of the town's population. Sri Lankan Malay is also the main language spoken in the area and as a result is the medium of instruction in the town.

== See also ==
- List of towns in Central Province, Sri Lanka
