= Central College =

Central College may refer to:

== Sri Lanka ==
- Central College (Sri Lanka), also known as Madhya Maha Vidyalaya

=== A-K ===
- Achchuveli Central College in Achchuvel
- Akkaraipattu Muslim Central College
- Ananda Central College, Elpitiya
- Anuradhapura Central College in North Central Province
- Bandaranayake Central College, Veyangoda Gampaha District
- Bandarawela Central College in Uva province
- Chenkalady Central College in Chenkalady
- D. S. Senanayake Central College in Mirigama, Gampaha District
- Galahitiyawa Central College in Ganemulla, Gampaha District
- Henegama Central College in Gampaha District
- Jaffna Central College in Jaffna
- Karandeniya Central College in Galle District of Southern Province
- Kattankudy Central College near Batticaloa
- Kilinochchi Central College in Kilinochchi
- Kuliyapitiya Central College in Kuliyapitiya, Kurunegala District
- Kirillawala Central College in Eldeniya, Gampaha District

=== M-Z ===
- Madina Central College in Madawala, Kandy District
- Mallavi Central College in Mallavi
- Mayurapada Central College, Dambadeniya
- Matara Central College in Matara City
- Meesalai Veerasingam Central College in Meesalai, Jaffna District
- Methodist Central College, Batticaloa
- Muslim Central College, Kalutara District
- Nalanda Boys' Central College in Minuwangoda, Gampaha District
- Nalanda Girls' College, Minuwangoda
- Nelliady Central College
- Nugawela Central College in Kandy District
- Omanthai Central College in Omanthai
- Pannawa Muslim Central College in Pannawa, Kurunegala District
- Piliyandala Central College in Piliyandala
- Pinnawala Central College in Rambukkana
- Polonnaruwa Royal Central College
- Poramadulla Central College in Rikillagaskada, Nuwara Eliya District
- Puthukkudiyiruppu Central College in Puthukkudiyiruppu
- Puttalam Hindu Central College in Puttalam, Puttalam District
- Rajapaksha Central College, Hambantota District
- Rajasinghe Central College in Ruwanwella, Kegalle District
- Sandalanka Central College, Kurunegala District
- Shams Central College, Maruthamunai, Ampara District
- Sivali Central College in Hidellana, Ratnapura District
- Telijjawila Central College in TelijjawilaMatara, Sri Lanka
- Thambiluvil Central College in Thambiluvil, Sri Lanka
- Tissa Central College in Kalutara, Kalutara District
- Velanai Central College in Velanai, Sri Lanka
- Vipulananda Central College, Karaitivu
- Weera Keppetipola Central College, Akuramboda, Matale District
- Wellawa Central College in Wellawa, Kurunegala District
- Wickramabahu Central College in Gampola, Kandy District
- Wijayaratnam Hindu Central College, Negombo

== United States ==
- Central College, the first name for the institution that became the University of Virginia
- Central College, a defunct college in Conway, Arkansas; see Doak S. Campbell, a president of the college
- Illinois Central College, a community college in Illinois
- North Central College, an arts college in Naperville, Illinois
- Olney Central College, a community college in Olney, Illinois
- Central College (Iowa), a private liberal arts college in Pella, Iowa, affiliated with the Reformed Church in America
- Blue Mont Central College, Manhattan, Kansas
- Central Christian College of Kansas, an evangelical Christian college in McPherson, Kansas
- South Central College, a community college in Minnesota
- Central Methodist University, Fayette, Missouri (formerly known as Central College)
- Central Female College, a former women's college in Lexington, Missouri
- East Central College, community college in Missouri
- New-York Central College, former college in McGraw, New York
- Ohio Central College, a former college in Iberia, Ohio
- Central College (Texas), a community college part of the Houston Community College System

== Other countries ==
- Central College (Glasgow), a former public college in Glasgow, Scotland
- Central College, Bengaluru, a college of science in Bengaluru, India
  - Central College metro station, of the Namma Metro of Bengaluru
- Central Colleges of the Philippines, Quezon City, Philippines
- St. John's Central College, in Cork City, Ireland
- Manila Central Colleges, the former name of Manila Central University, Philippines

== See also ==
- Central State (disambiguation)
- Central University (disambiguation)
- Centre College
