= List of the oldest schools in Sri Lanka =

The following is a list of the oldest schools in Sri Lanka that are still functioning.

Current name	Foundation name	Foundation date	Founders	Province	District	Education zone	Location	Current type	References
Methodist Central College		29 July 1814	Wesleyan Methodist Mission	Eastern	Batticaloa	Batticaloa	Batticaloa	Provincial	
Newstead Girls College	Wesley Girl's High School	31 July 1816	Wesleyan Methodist Mission	Western	Gampaha	Negombo	Negombo	National	
Union College, Tellippalai	Common Free School	9 December 1816	American Ceylon Mission	Northern	Jaffna	Valikamam	Tellippalai	Provincial	
Jaffna Central College	Jaffna Wesleyan English School	1817 (Note: Jaffna Central College claims its foundation to be 1 August 1816 which is when the missionaries purchased the land/property.)	Wesleyan Methodist Mission, North Ceylon	Northern	Jaffna	Jaffna	Jaffna	National	
Christ Church Boys' School	Baddegama Seminary	March 1819	Church Mission Society of the Anglican Church	Southern	Galle	Baddegama	Baddegama	National	
Methodist Girls' College, Trincomalee		1819	Wesleyan Methodist Mission	Eastern	Trincomalee	Trincomalee	Trincomalee	Provincial	
Vincent Girls' High School		1820	Wesleyan Methodist Mission	Eastern	Batticaloa	Batticaloa	Batticaloa	National	
Sri Jayawardenepura Maha Vidyalaya	Cotta Institute	1822	Church Mission Society of the Anglican Church	Western	Colombo	Sri Jayawardenepura	Sri Jayawardenapura		
St. John's College, Jaffna	Nallur English Seminary	March 1823	Church Mission Society of the Anglican Church	Northern	Jaffna	Jaffna	Jaffna	Private	
Methodist Girls' High School, Point Pedro	Wesleyan Mission Central School	1823	Wesleyan Methodist Mission, North Ceylon	Northern	Jaffna	Vadamarachchi	Point Pedro	Provincial	
Vigneshwara Maha Vidyalaya		1823	Wesleyan Methodist Mission	Eastern	Trincomalee	Trincomalee	Trincomalee		
Uduvil Girls' College	Missionary Seminary and Female Central School	1824	American Ceylon Mission	Northern	Jaffna	Valikamam	Uduvil	Private	
Vembadi Girls' High School		1834	Wesleyan Methodist Mission, North Ceylon	Northern	Jaffna	Jaffna	Jaffna	National	
Royal College, Colombo	Hill Street Academy	1835		Western	Colombo	Colombo	Colombo	National	
Manipay Memorial English School		1836	American Ceylon Mission	Northern	Jaffna	Valikamam	Manipay	Provincial	
Hartley College	Wesleyan Mission Central School	1838 (Note: Other sources claim that Hartley College is a successor to the Point Pedro Native School founded in 1818.)	Wesleyan Methodist Mission, North Ceylon	Northern	Jaffna	Vadamarachchi	Point Pedro	Provincial	
St. Thomas' College, Matara		10 March 1844	Christian Missionary Society of England	Southern	Matara	Matara	Matara	National	
Holy Family Convent, Jaffna		1845		Northern	Jaffna	Jaffna	Jaffna	Provincial	
St. Matthew's College, Colombo		1847	Church Mission Society of the Anglican Church	Western	Colombo	Colombo	Colombo	Provincial	
Kopay Christian College		1850		Northern	Jaffna	Jaffna	Kopay	Provincial	
St. Patrick's College, Jaffna	Jaffna Catholic English School	1850	Roman Catholic Church	Northern	Jaffna	Jaffna	Jaffna	Private	
S. Thomas' College, Mount Lavinia	College of St. Thomas the Apostle	3 February 1851	Church of Ceylon	Western	Colombo		Mount Lavinia	Private	
Udupiddy American Mission College		4 January 1852	American Ceylon Mission	Northern	Jaffna	Vadamarachchi	Udupiddy	Provincial	
St. Anthony's College, Kandy		1854	Roman Catholic Church	Central	Kandy	Kandy	Kandy	Private	
St. Sebastian's College, Moratuwa		1854	Roman Catholic Church	Western	Colombo		Moratuwa	Private	
St. Xavier's College, Nuwara Eliya		1859	Roman Catholic Church	Central	Nuwara Eliya				
St. Mary's College, Trincomalee		1864		Eastern	Trincomalee	Trincomalee	Trincomalee	National	
St. Benedict's College, Colombo		1865	Benedictine monks	Western	Colombo	Colombo	Colombo	Private	
Methodist College, Colombo	Kollupitiya Girls' English School	7 November 1866	Wesleyan Methodist Mission	Western	Colombo	Colombo	Colombo	Private	
St. Mary's College, Kegalle		1 March 1867	Rev. Fr. Domenico Pingulani	Sabaragamuwa	Kegalle	Kegalle	Kegalle	National	
Uva College, Badulla		1867	Diocesan mission of Ceylon	Uva	Badulla	Badulla	Badulla	National	
St. Joseph's College, Trincomalee		27 July 1867	Oblates of Mary Immaculate	Eastern	Trincomalee	Trincomalee	Trincomalee	National	
All Saints College, Galle		1867	Anglicans	Southern	Galle		Galle		
Jaffna College		1871	American Ceylon Mission	Northern	Jaffna	Valikamam	Vaddukoddai	Private	
Good Shepherd Convent, Colombo		1 May 1869	Good Shepherd Order	Western	Colombo	Colombo	Colombo	Private	
Sri Dhammasara Piyaratana Maha Vidyalaya	Jinalabdhi Vishodaka	1869	Sri Piyaratana Tissa Mahanayake Thero	Southern	Galle	Ambalangoda	Dodanduwa	Provincial	
Rippon College	Whitfield Road Girls' School	1871	Wesleyan Methodist Mission	Southern	Galle	Galle	Galle	National	
St. Mary's College, Negombo		1871	Roman Catholic Church	Western	Gampaha	Negombo	Negombo		
Trinity College, Kandy	Kandy Collegiate School	17 January 1872	Church Mission Society of the Anglican Church	Central	Kandy	Kandy	Kandy	Private	
St. Anthony's College, Kayts		1872		Northern	Jaffna	Islands	Kayts	Provincial	
St. Michael's College National School	St. Mary's English School	1873	Roman Catholic Church	Eastern	Batticaloa	Batticaloa	Batticaloa	National	
St. Thomas' College, Matale		1873		Central	Matale	Matale	Matale	National	
Wesley College, Colombo		2 March 1874	Wesleyan Methodist Mission	Western	Colombo	Colombo	Colombo	Private	
Bishop's College, Colombo		February 1875	Church Mission Society of the Anglican Church	Western	Colombo	Colombo	Colombo	Private	
Drieberg College	Drieberg English School	1875	American Ceylon Mission	Northern	Jaffna	Thenmarachchi	Chavakachcheri	Provincial	
Methodist Central College, Hakmana		1875	Wesleyan Methodist Mission	Southern	Matara	Mulatiyana	Hakmana	Provincial	
Richmond College, Galle	The Galle High School	1 May 1876 (Note: Other sources trace the origins of Richmond College to 1814.)	Wesleyan Methodist Mission	Southern	Galle	Galle	Galle	National	
Prince of Wales' College, Moratuwa		14 September 1876		Western	Colombo	Piliyandala	Moratuwa	National	
St. John's College, Panadura		1876		Western	Kalutara		Panadura		
Victoria College, Chulipuram	Chulipuram Hindu English School	1876		Northern	Jaffna	Valikamam	Chulipuram	Provincial	
Girls' High School, Kandy		May 1879 (Note: Other sources claim that Girls' High School, Kandy was founded in 1871 but re-organized in 1879.)	Wesleyan Methodist Mission	Central	Kandy	Kandy	Kandy	National	
Southlands College, Galle	Girls' High School	1885 (Note: Other sources claim that Southlands College, Galle is a successor to the Wesleyan English Girls' School founded in 1842 and renamed Girls' High School, Galle.)	Wesleyan Methodist Mission	Southern	Galle	Galle	Galle	National	
Ananda College	English Buddhist School	1 November 1886	Buddhist Theosophical Society	Western	Colombo	Colombo	Colombo	National	
Dharmaraja College	Kandy Buddhist High School	30 June 1887	Buddhist Theosophical Society	Central	Kandy	Kandy	Kandy	National	
Jaffna Hindu College	The Native Town High School	1887		Northern	Jaffna	Jaffna	Jaffna	National	
Piliyandala Central College	Mampe Piyarathanasara Buddhist Mix School	1887	Rev. Mampe Saranapala Thero	Western	Colombo	Piliyandala	Piliyandala	National	
Christ Church Girls' College	The Girls' Boarding School	1 June 1888	Church Mission Society of the Anglican Church	Southern	Galle	Baddegama	Baddegama	National	
Maliyadeva College	Kurunegala Buddhist Institution	30 September 1888	Buddhist Theosophical Society	North Western	Kurunegala	Kurunegala	Kurunegala	National	
Ananda Sastralaya, Kotte	Kotte Bauddha (Buddhist) Mixed School	1 January 1890 (Note: Few sources claims its foundation to be 4 November 1890.)		Western	Colombo	Sri Jayawardenapura	Kotte	National	
Holy Cross College, Kalutara		1890		Western	Kalutara	Kalutara South	Kalutara	Private	
Rambaikulam Girls' Maha Vidyalayam		1890		Northern	Vavuniya	Vavuniya South	Vavuniya	National	
Hillwood College, Kandy		1890		Central	Kandy	Kandy Central	Kandy	Private	
Kingswood College, Kandy	The Boys' High School	4 May 1891	Wesleyan Methodist Mission	Central	Kandy	Kandy	Kandy	National	
Musaeus College	Musaeus Buddhist Girls' School	1891	Buddhist Theosophical Society	Western	Colombo	Colombo	Colombo	Private	
Dharmadutha College		21 August 1891	Buddhist Theosophical Society	Uva	Badulla	Badulla	Badulla	National	
Mahinda College		1 March 1892	Buddhist Theosophical Society	Southern	Galle	Galle	Galle	National	
Zahira College, Colombo	Al-Madrasathul Zahira	22 August 1892	Colombo Muslim Educational Society	Western	Colombo	Colombo	Colombo	Private	
St. Aloysius' College, Galle		1895	Jesuits	Southern	Galle	Galle	Galle	National	
Chundikuli Girls' College		14 January 1896	Church Mission Society of the Anglican Church	Northern	Jaffna	Jaffna	Jaffna	Private	
St. Joseph's College, Colombo		2 March 1896	French Roman Catholic missionaries	Western	Colombo	Colombo	Colombo	Private	
Sacred Heart Convent, Galle		30 November 1896	Sisters of Charity of Jesus and Mary	Southern	Galle	Galle	Galle		
St. Servatius' College		2 November 1897	Roman Catholic Belgian Jesuit	Southern	Matara	Matara	Kotuwegoda	National	
R. K. M. Sri Koneswara Hindu College		1897		Eastern	Trincomalee	Trincomalee	Trincomalee	National	
St. Aloysius College, Ratnapura	Peter & Paul's Mixed School	1898	Jesuits	Sabaragamuwa	Ratnapura	Ratnapura	Ratnapura	National	

== See also ==
- List of the oldest schools in the world
- List of schools in Sri Lanka
