= Central Province =

Central Province may refer to:

- Central Province (Kenya)
- Central Province, Maldives
- Central Province (Papua New Guinea)
- Central Province (Solomon Islands)
- Central Province, Sri Lanka
- Central Province (Victoria), an electorate of the Victorian Legislative Council, Australia, 1856–1882
- Central Province (Western Australia), an electoral province of the Legislative Council of Western Australia, 1894–1989
- Central Province, Zambia
- Central Provinces, India, 1861-1936
- Central Provinces and Berar, a province of British India 1936-1950 corresponding roughly to Madhya Pradesh
  - Central Provinces and Berar Circuit or C. P.-Berar Circuit, a Hindi film distribution circuit comprising parts of Madhya Pradesh, Chhattisgarh and Maharashtra
- Centre Province, Cameroon
- Markazi province, Iran
- Madhya Pradesh, India
- Töv Province, Mongolia

Central province may also refer to the province in the centre of the country, such as:

- Manitoba, Canada

== See also ==
- Central provinces (disambiguation)
- Central State (disambiguation)
