= Vincent Girls' High School =

National school in Sri Lanka

- வின்சன்ட் மகளிர் உயர்தரப் பாடசாலை/ වින්සන්ට් උසස් බාලිකා විද්‍යාලය
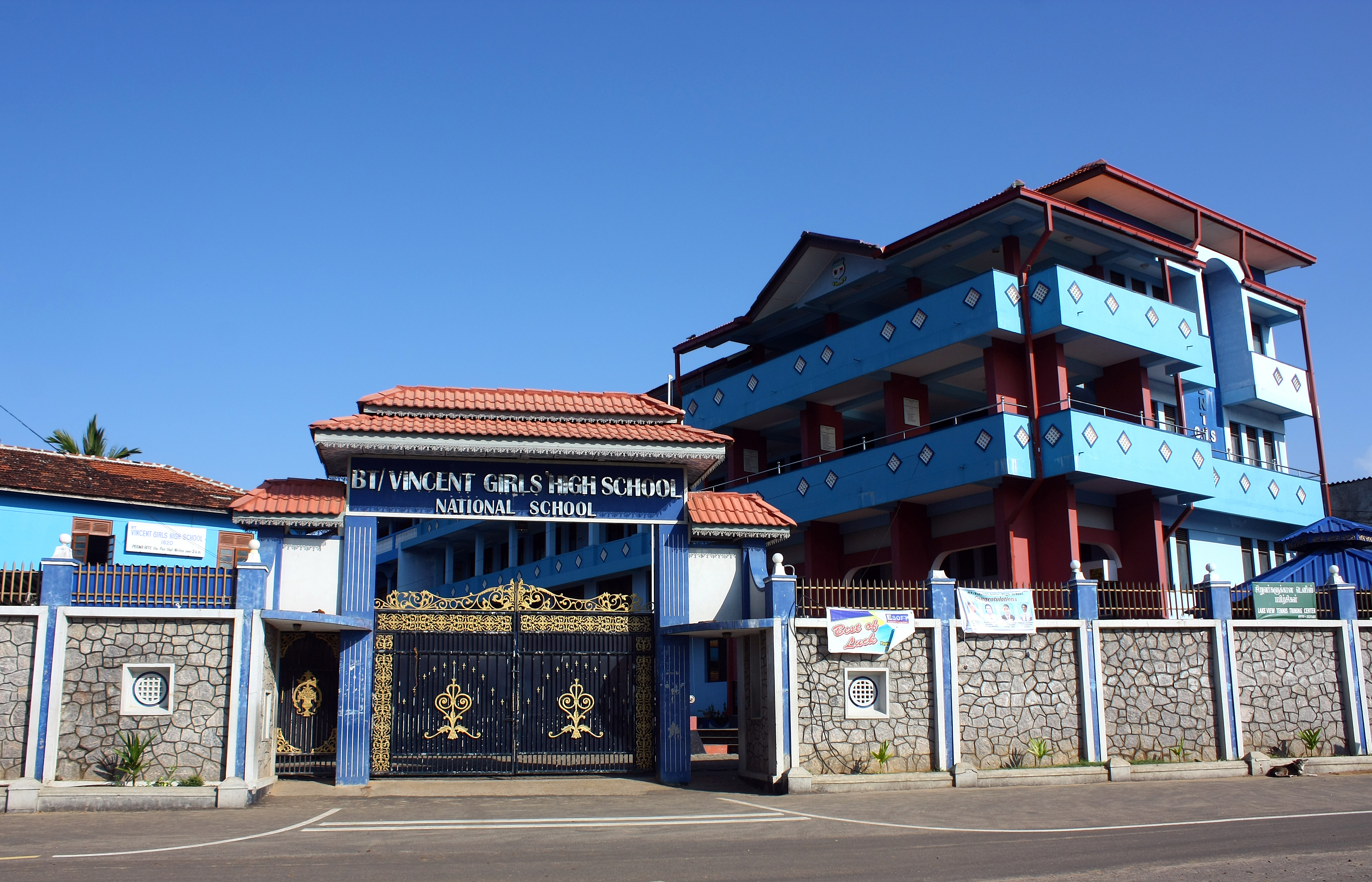

Location
- Chapel St, Batticaloa; Batticaloa, Batticaloa District, Sri Lanka, Eastern Province; Sri Lanka
- Coordinates: 7°42′44.30″N 81°41′54.80″E

Information
- School type: Public national 1AB
- Motto: TO THE GLORY OF GOD
- Founded: 1820; 206 years ago
- Founder: William Ault
- School district: Batticaloa Education Zone
- Authority: Ministry of Education
- Principal: Thavathirumagal Udayakumar
- Gender: girls
- Age: 3 to 18
- Enrollment: 3000+
- Language: English, Tamil, Bilingual
- Houses: Croft; Padman; Vincent; Champness
- Colors: Blue and gold
- Song: "Have you Heard the Golden City"

Vincent Girls' High School (Tamil: வின்சன்ட் மகளிர் உயர்தரப் பாடசாலை) is a national school in Batticaloa, Sri Lanka.

== History ==
The Wesleyan Methodist Christian Missionaries founded the school in 1820. However, according to historical researches, the school has been founded by the same Wesleyan Methodist missionary, William Ault who had founded Methodist Central College. The school was housed in Joshua Hall (Mrs. Joshua's Hall), Mudaliyár Street, Batticaloa during its early years before being shifted to the present premises.

In 1895 with the coming of Amy Vincent it was found necessary to start an English section for the benefit of the English-speaking children (16 on the roll). In 1902 a separate English Department was started alongside the Tamil Boarding School. Vincent overworked her strength in establishing the separate English School that took her name, and was invalided home in 1902, where after a painful illness she died in 1905.

For the next ten years Misses Hall, Duckering, and Church, all gave short periods of service and, amid constant changes in the staff, the work was carried on with great difficulty. Then in 1911 Florence Fuller arrived, with considerable experience of secondary school work in England. That year G. de la Zilva was admitted into the Training College for specialist training in kindergarten work. In 1916 three girls appeared for the first time for the E.S.L.C. examination. Laurel Thambimuttu (J. W. R. Casinader), the first Vincent girl to pass, later went on to do her London B.Sc. (Economics). In 1921 the Tamil Boarding School was abolished and the English School raised to the status of a graded school. Fuller had given ten years magnificent service, under great difficulties.

When C. Croft (1922–1946) arrived to take over, there were 84 pupils on the roll, and 365 when she retired 24 years later, and this was undoubtedly a period of expansion. Accommodation soon became a difficulty and in 1929 a large Dormitory block was put up. The ground floor had a spacious Prayer Hall, much used by the Boarders and the local Sunday School. In 1928 the School was again upgraded, and in 1932 Eugene Nallaratnam (R. Edwards) was the first pupil to be successful in the Senior Cambridge examination. With the arrival from England of O. Champness as vice-principal, the Domestic Science and the Art Departments received much attention. The school received much help for its widening curriculum at this time from the first few Indian graduates to join the staff. At the end of the period Croft too was herself giving attention to the organising of games and physical education at Vincent, in addition to all the work involved in supervising a rapidly expanding School and the Hostel.

When in 1962 all Methodist Mission Schools were vested in the Government and the school too was vested.

== See also ==
- List of schools in Eastern Province, Sri Lanka
