= Central provinces =

Central provinces may refer to:

- Central Canada
- Central Provinces of former British India (1861–1936)
- Central Provinces and Berar of former British India (1936–1950)
- Central Provinces and Berar Circuit or C. P.-Berar Circuit, a Hindi film distribution circuit comprising parts of Madhya Pradesh, Chhattisgarh and Maharashtra
- Six Central Provinces of China

== See also ==
- Central Province (disambiguation)
