= St. Michael's College National School =

St. Michael's College, Batticaloa
- புனித மிக்கேல் கல்லூரி, மட்டக்களப்பு

Location
- Father Weber Street; Batticaloa, Batticaloa District, Eastern Province, 30000; Sri Lanka
- Coordinates: 7°42′41.30″N 81°41′45.70″E

Information
- School type: Public national 1AB
- Motto: Quis ut Deus (Who is like God)
- Religious affiliation: Christianity
- Denomination: Roman Catholicism
- Founded: 1873; 153 years ago
- Founder: Francis Xavier Philip
- Status: Nationalised in 1961
- School district: Batticaloa Education Zone
- Authority: Ministry of Education
- Principal: A. B. Joseph
- Grades: 1-13
- Gender: Boys
- Age range: 5-19
- Enrollment: 3,000+
- Language: English, Tamil
- Houses: Bonnel Marian Miller Crowther
- Slogan: A College second to none
- Song: Sons of Blessed St.Michael
- Sports: Basketball, Cricket, Tennis
- Yearbook: Paadumeen
- Website: smc.edu.lk
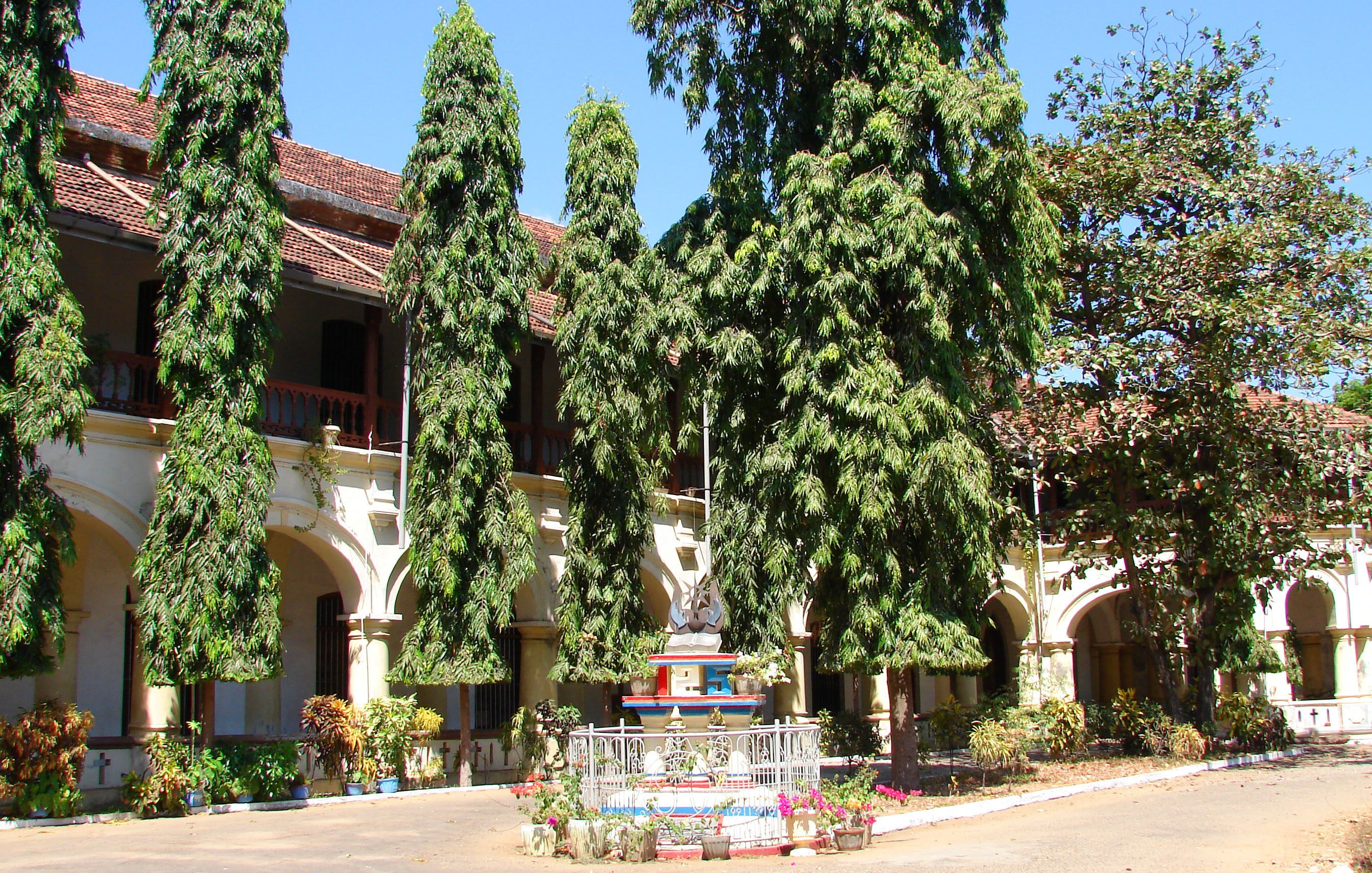

St. Michael's College, Batticaloa (SMC; Tamil: புனித மிக்கேல் கல்லூரி, மட்டக்களப்பு; known as St. Michael's College) is a national school in Batticaloa, Sri Lanka.

== History ==
St. Michael's College National School is a national school in Batticaloa, Sri Lanka. In 1868, Fr. Francis Xavier Philip was sent to Batticaloa by the Bishop of Jaffna, Christophe Ernest Bonjean (OMI), to establish an English boys' school. Philip established three schools in Batticaloa, St. Mary's English school, St. Mary's vernacular school and St. Cecilia's girls school. In 1873 St. Mary’s English school (which later became St. Michael's College) was constructed on land donated by Paschal Mudaliyar. The first principal was Joseph Abraham, with three teachers and 57 pupils.

In 1895, the French Jesuits took over, and the first Bishop of Trincomalee, Charles Lavigne, tasked the Jesuit priests to establish a boys' school, with the assistance of Governor Henry McCallum. On 16 July 1912, the cornerstone for the school was laid by Governor McCallum. On 3 May 1915 the school, St. Michael's College, was opened by the Director of Education, with the first principal, Fr. Ferdinand Bonnel, who remained in charge of the college for forty years. The school buildings were designed by architect, J. W. C. Ward.

St. Michael's College was affected by the civil war in Sri Lanka. In 1990, the school was closed for two years due to security concerns. However, it reopened in 1992 and has continued to operate since then

== Sports ==
The St. Michael's College is noted for its basketball programme and has won several all-island basketball championships. Their victories made the school popular and were dubbed as The Invincibles. Jesuit missionaries introduced basketball to Batticaloa, and installed the first basketball court within the school premises. There were several Jesuit priests who played basketball and were good at it. Fr. Hamilton, Fr. Ralph Riemen, Fr. Eugene John Hebert, Fr. Harold J. Weber and Rajan Nadarajah were among the best contributors.

== See also ==
- List of the oldest schools in Sri Lanka
- List of schools in Eastern Province, Sri Lanka
