= Kattankudy Central College =

- காத்தான்குடி மத்திய கல்லூரி කාත්තාන්කුඩි මධ්‍ය මහා විද්‍යාලය
- Kattankudy Central College (Sri Lanka)

Location
- Beach Road, New Kattankudy; Eastern Province; Sri Lanka; 7°40′49″N 81°43′34″E

Information
- Type: 1AB (Secondary)
- Established: 6 January 1930
- Founder: Muthaliyaar Sinnalebba
- Status: National School
- School district: Batticaloa District
- Principal: Mr. A. L. Sabry
- Grades: Grade 6 to Grade 13
- Gender: Co-educational (Mixed)
- Enrollment: 2100
- Campus: 14 acres
- Census Number: 14145
- Website: kcc.kky

Kattankudy Central College is a co-educational national school situated in Kattankudy, a coastal township in the Batticaloa District, Sri Lanka. Established on 6 January 1930, it holds historical significance as the first Central College founded specifically to serve the Sri Lankan Muslim community.

The school is classified as a 1AB secondary institution by the Ministry of Education, offering classes from Grade 6 to Grade 13, including Advanced Level streams in Arts, Commerce, Science, and Technology.

== History ==
Kattankudy Central College was established on 6 January 1930 during the British colonial era. The founding addressed an acute lack of modern secondary educational infrastructure for Muslim youth in the Eastern Province. Prior to its inception, the local populace in the densely populated township primarily prioritized commercial trade and maritime industries, which historically resulted in low academic retention rates past primary education.

Initially, enrollment grew slowly due to socio-economic demands where young boys frequently left formal schooling after Grade 5 to join family business ventures. However, national educational reforms post-1970s, coupled with regional economic shifts and a changing socio-political climate in the Eastern Province, reshaped community priorities. The institution subsequently transformed into an academic hub, increasingly producing professionals in public administration, law, engineering, medicine, and diplomacy.

== Campus ==
The school sits on a 14-acre campus located along Beach Road in the central urban area of Kattankudy. The infrastructure includes classrooms, science and computer laboratories, a main auditorium, and a playground area catering to inter-school sports events.

== Academics ==
The college operates as a provincial and national center for secondary education under the jurisdiction of the Batticaloa Central Zonal Education Office. It conducts classes exclusively in the Tamil language medium. The curriculum spans:

- Junior Secondary Education: Grade 6 to Grade 9.
- Senior Secondary Education: Grade 10 to Grade 11, culminating in the GCE Ordinary Level examinations.
- Collegiate Level: Grade 12 to Grade 13, preparing students for the GCE Advanced Level examinations across major streams, including Biosystems Technology, Physical Sciences, Commerce, and Arts.

== Extracurricular activities ==
Students engage in various sports and co-curricular programs, competing at the zonal, provincial, and national levels. Major sports played at the college include:

- Cricket
- Football
- Athletics

Societies and student bodies include the Cadet Corps, Scouting, Environmental Society, and various subject-specific student unions.

== Student programmes ==
The educational institution has multiple student programmes.

=== Athletics ===
- Football (soccer)

=== Other ===
- SLIIT Softskills+

== See also ==
- List of schools in Eastern Province, Sri Lanka
- Central College (Sri Lanka)
