= Dasis Manchanayake =

Sri Lankan cricketer

Personal information
- Full name: Subasinghe Manchanayake Appuhamilage Dasis Kaveeja Manchanayake
- Born: 8 October 2003 (age 22)
- Batting: Left-handed
- Bowling: Slow left arm orthodox

Domestic team information
- Years: Team
- 2023-present: Tamil Union Cricket and Athletic Club
- Source: Cricinfo, 15 December 2023

Subasinghe Manchanayake Appuhamilage Dasis Kaveeja Manchanayake (born 8 October 2003) is a Sri Lankan cricketer. He has played four first-class matches representing Tamil Union Cricket and Athletic Club.

== Biography ==
His father Tissa Manchanayake served as a mechanical engineer and also worked as a chief manager at People's Bank in Head Office. His father studied at the Bandaranayake Central College, Veyangoda. Dasis began his primary and secondary education at Royal College, Colombo. He began his interest in the sport of cricket at Royal College, Colombo. He was selected for training at the Royal College Cricket Academy at the age of eight.

== Career ==
In March 2020, he was selected to represent the first choice Royal College school cricket team for the 141st Battle of the Blues encounter and he scored a half-century in his debut big match. In January 2023, he scored a double century playing for Royal College against Gurukula College, Kelaniya in a match at the Under-19 Inter-Schools Division 1 Two-Day Cricket Tournament.

In March 2023, he scored a century and a half-century in the same school cricket match, which eventually came in the 144th Battle of the Blues encounter played between the two leading schools in Colombo, Royal College and S. Thomas' College, Mount Lavinia. He became the first Royal College captain to achieve the rare feat of scoring a century and a half-century in a same schools three-day cricket match and also became the first Royal College captain in 27 years to score a century in a big match. He was dismissed for 137 runs on the first day of the 144th Battle of the Blues match and became the 27th player from Royal College to have scored a century in the history of the Battle of the Blues. He captained his school side Royal College to a comfortable victory by a margin of 180 runs in their annual schools big match encounter over the rivals S. Thomas' College. He also stitched a crucial fifth wicket partnership worth 229 runs alongside Ramiru Perera in Royal College's first innings which turned out to be the point-of-difference in the context of the 144th Battle of the Blues Big Match encounter and it was also the highest ever fifth wicket partnership put on by a pair for Royal College. He also ended up the 2022–23 schools cricket season with an aggregate of over 1000 runs.

He made his first-class debut playing for Tamil Union Cricket and Athletic Club against Sri Lanka Police Sports Club on 7 July 2023 during the 2023 Major League Tournament. He scored century on his first-class debut while batting at number eight position, way down the order during Tamil Union's first innings total of 244. He also eventually top-scored for Tamil Union in the first innings by scoring 111 runs off 199 deliveries. He was clean bowled by first-class veteran spinner Malinda Pushpakumara, cheaply for five runs in the second innings of his debut test match.
