= Wickramabahu Central College =

- වික්‍රමබාහු මධ්‍ය විද්‍යාලය விக்கறமபாஹு மத்திய வித்தியாலயம்

Location
- Nawalapitiya Road, Gampola; Central 20500; Sri Lanka; 7°9′14.94″N 80°33′49.97″E

Information
- School type: National school 1AB Super
- Motto: "සුනාථ ධාරේථ චරාත....."; Pali - "Sunatha Dharetha Charatha" ("Listen, Concentrate, Act Accordingly")
- Religious affiliation: Buddhism
- Established: 1946 (80 years ago)
- School district: Kandy
- School number: 12671
- Principal: E. A. D. K. K. Edirisinghe
- Teaching staff: 96
- Grades: Class 6 – 13
- Gender: Mixed
- Age: 12 to 18
- Enrolment: 1,500+
- Language: Sinhala and English
- Houses: "හේමන්ත, සරත්, සිසිර, වසන්ත" "Hemantha, Sarath, Sisira, Wasantha"
- Colours: Maroon and gold
- Song: "මාතාවනි වික්‍රමබා විදුහල්....." "Mathawani Wickramaba Viduhal....."
- Website: www.wickramabahu.sch.lk

Wickramabahu Central College (National School) (Sinhala: වික්‍රමබාහු මධ්‍ය විද්‍යාලය(ජාතික පාසල), founded in 1946, is a Madhya Maha Vidyalaya (central college) located in Gampola in Central Province, Sri Lanka. It is a Buddhist school with approximately 96 teaching staff and 1,500 students. It has been a co-educational school for the past 80 years.

== History ==
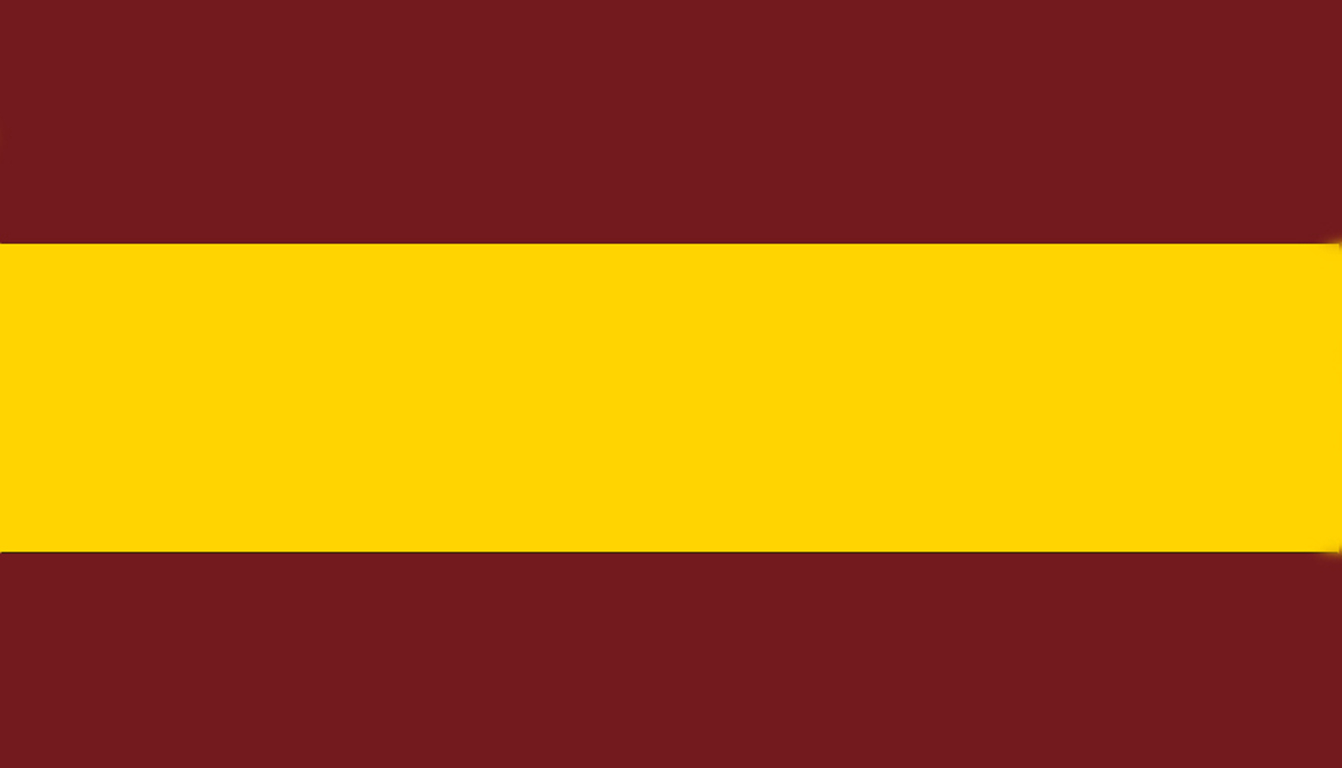
Flag of Wickramabahu Central College (National School)

The school was established on 3 January 1946, with four teachers and 55 students, under the name of Wallahagoda Central College. It was started in a Buddhist temple, Niyangampaya Raja Maha Viharaya. A. G. G. Perera was the inaugural principal, serving for six months.

In 1951, the foundation was laid by Prime Minister D. S. Senanayake for a new building, which opened in 1954 to house the college, which was renamed Gampola Central College. High School Certificate classes commenced in 1952.

From 1946 to 1954, all classes were conducted in English. In 1955 the medium of education was changed to Sinhalese.

In 1960, with the change of government, the Minister of Education reformed the education system, leading Gampola Central College to become a boys-only school, under the new name Wickramabahu Central College.

== See also ==
- National school (Sri Lanka)
- List of schools in Central Province, Sri Lanka
