= Ferdinand Bonnel =

Sri Lankan priest (1865–1945)

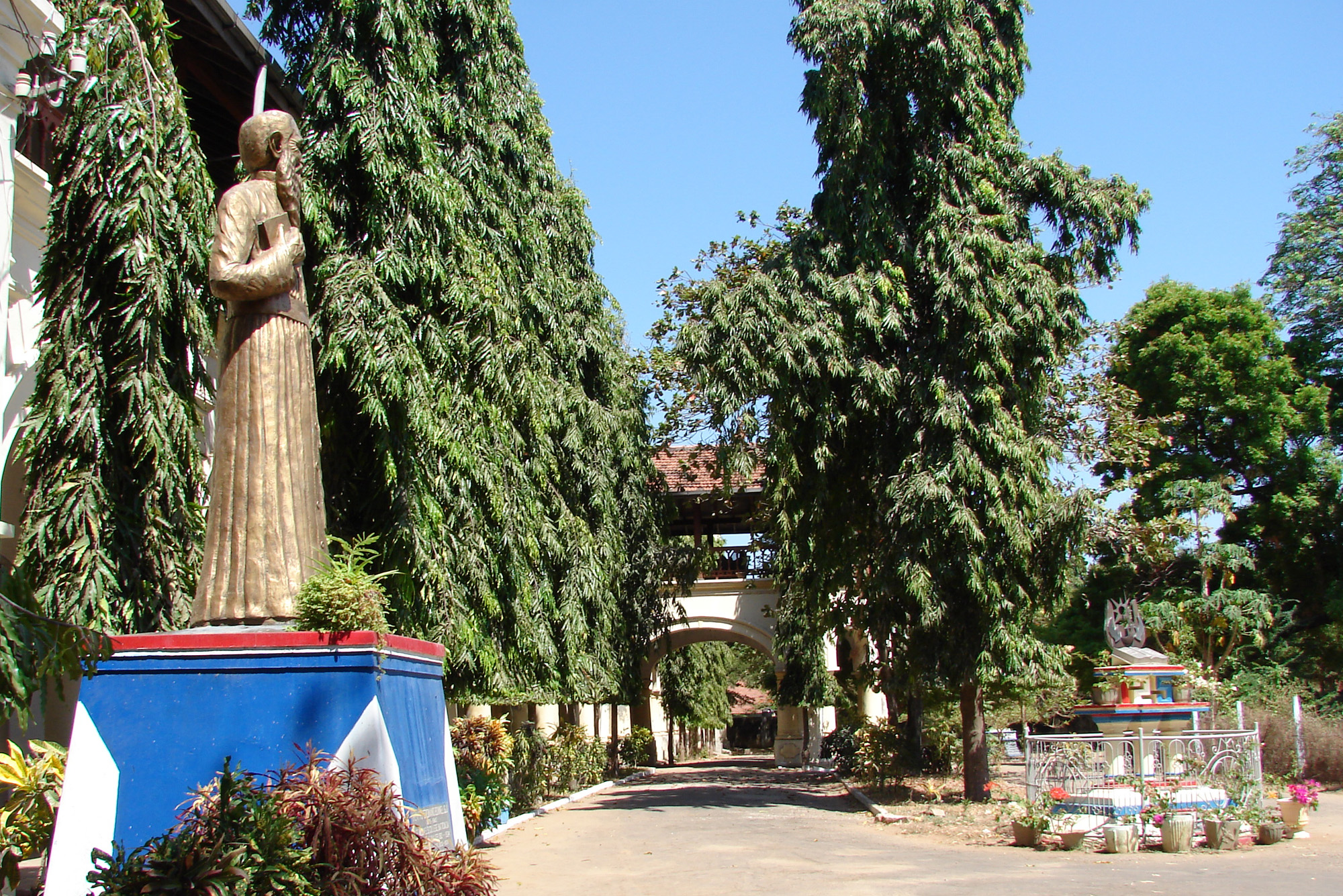
- Statue of Fr. Bonnel in front of St. Michael's College National School, Batticaloa
- Born: Ferdinand Bonnel; 31 August 1865; Roubaix, France
- Died: 7 May 1945 (aged 79); Batticaloa, Sri Lanka
- Occupation: Jesuit priest
- Employer: Jesuits
- Known for: Educator

Rev. Fr. Ferdinand Bonnel, S.J., 31 August 1865 in Roubaix, France – 7 May 1945 in Batticaloa, Sri Lanka, was a French Jesuit priest.

== Biography ==
Bonnel was trained as novitiate of the Society of Jesus in Gemert, Netherlands, commencing 7 September 1888. His training continued with the study of philosophy (1891–1893) and theology (1897–1900) at the seminary of the Jesuits in Enghien, Belgium, with a break for a few years of apostolic experience in Reims between 1893 and 1897. He was ordained priest in Enghien in August 1899.

In 1902, he joined his brother Fr Charles Bonnel (also a Jesuit priest) as a missionary in Ceylon (now known as Sri Lanka). Bonnel spent a year studying the Tamil language (1902–1903) before he was appointed director of St. Michael's College National School. A position in which he remained for over forty years. He is one of the architects of St. Michael's College.

Twice he combined his duties as director with the Regional Superior of the Jesuits in the region of Trincomalee (from 1917 to 1930 and again from 1932 to 1944), after the unexpected death of his successor, Maurice Boutry. Bonnel was also for a time the vicar general of the diocese of Trincomalee.

Bonnel died in Batticaloa, on 7 May 1945, aged 79. Bonnel is considered as a renowned educator, who has been honored by issuing a Sri Lankan postage stamp with his image in 1988.
