= Central State =

Central State may refer to:

- Madhya Pradesh (lit. 'Middle State'), a state in central India
- Henan, a province in the central part of China
- Central Regions State, a regional state in Somalia
- Central State University, a university in Wilberforce, Ohio, US
- University of Central Oklahoma, a university in Edmond, Oklahoma, US which was named Central State University
- The word for China (中国; 'Central state'); See Names of China

== See also ==
- Central Province (disambiguation)
- Central University (disambiguation)
- Central College (disambiguation)
