= St. Aloysius College, Ratnapura =

St. Aloysius' College
- ශාන්ත ඇලෝසියස් විද්‍යාලය

Location
- Ratnapura; Sri Lanka
- Coordinates: 6°40′53″N 80°24′11″E

Information
- Type: National School
- Motto: Latin: Age Quod Agis; English: Mind What You Do
- Religious affiliation: Roman Catholic
- Established: 1898; 128 years ago
- Founders: Pierre Boulic; S. S. Peter Wallyn
- Staff: 150+
- Grades: 1 - 13
- Gender: Boys (Male)
- Age: 6 to 19
- Enrollment: 3,000+
- Colours: Blue and white
- Song: English Version: "Hail the White, Hail the Blue"; Sinhala Version: "සම⁣නොල පිස එන සුළගේ, අගනා මිණි රැදි පියසේ, ඇලෝසියස් විදුහල් නාමේ, සැරදේ ඔරැදේ හෙල දෙරණේ"

St. Aloysius' College (Sinhala: ශාන්ත ඇලෝසියස් විද්‍යාලය; also referred to as Aloysius College, Ratnapura or simply as Aloysius) is a boys' high school located in Ratnapura, the capital city of Sabaragamuwa Province in Sri Lanka. The school was established in 1898 by Fr: Pierre Boulic. St. Aloysius' College is a National School and the largest boys' school in Sabaragamuwa. It provides primary and secondary education.

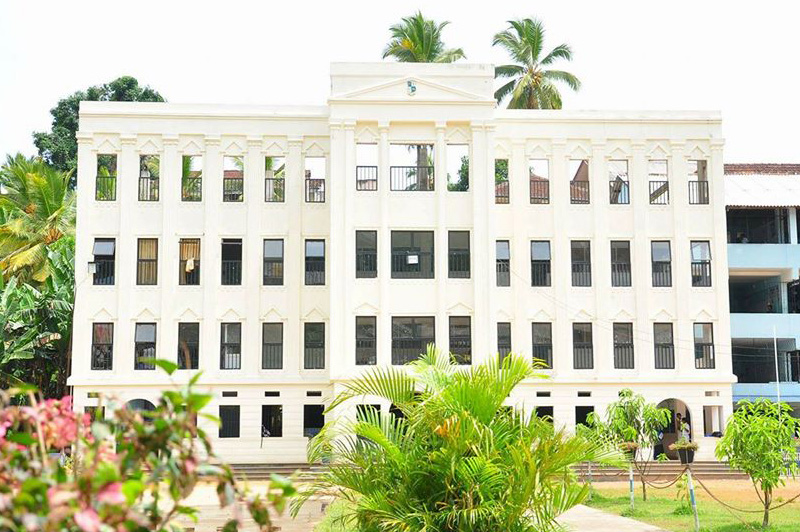
College Building

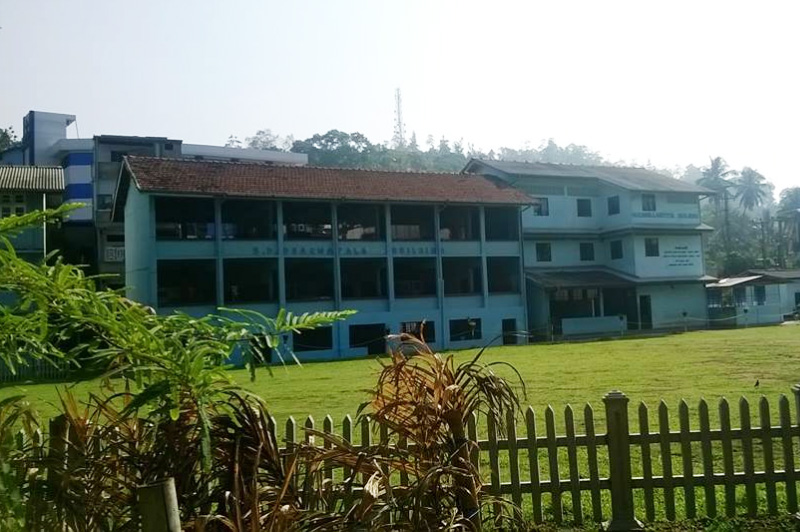
College Ground

== History ==
St. Aloysius' College has a long history which is about more than 120 years. Rev. Father Pierre Boulic was appointed the in-charge father of missionary duties in the St. Padrew and Paul's Church in Ratnapura on 3 December 1886. He found that there was no Sinhala or Tamil school for the Catholic children in Sabaragamuwa Province and as a result decided to establish such a school in Ratnapura. He determined to open a school but the main problem was a place. There was only 2.3 m^{2} (25 sq ft) of space in the church premises and the church was surrounded by large rocks. At last a coolie came from Balangoda blasted all the rocks and used them to build the walls of the new school. Don Martinus Abeyratne supplied materials for the roof. Other expenses were supplied by Catholics and Father Boulic. This Anglo-vernacular school was opened in the month of June 1888 by Rev. Father Pierre Boulic. The school was named as St. Peter's School which was a mixed one.

English and Sinhala were taught in the school. On the opening day 40 students were presented. There were four teachers. John Perera and Father S. J. Perera taught to the boys and two other lady teachers (neither of which were certificated teachers) taught to the girls. John Perera was a reporter at the "Times of Ceylon" and at that time was residing in Ratnapura. He kindly offered his service to the school and taught in the school since 1888 till 1890. St. Peter's School commenced 1888 and it ceased to function in 1893.

In 1898 Father S. S. Peter Wallyn arrived to Ratnapura and he heard about the 'defunct' Anglo-vernacular school which had been opened by Father Boulic. Father Wallyn decided to re-open the school and established an English middle school, Peter and Paul's Mixed School. There were 24 students at the opening day.

In 1899 Father Wallyn moved to Balangoda. In October 1899 Father A. Closset became the second manager of St.Peter and Paul's School. He registered the school as an Assisted English School for boys and girls. The land on which the school stands today was donated to Father Closset by Mr. Grero. In 1900 the name of Peter and Paul's School was changed to St. Aloysius' English School for girls and boys.

There after in 1901-1904 period Rev. Father A. Stache was appointed as the third manager of St. Aloysius' English School. During this period the hostel of the college was built on the property of a gentleman called Dr.Oliveux who sold the property to Rev Father J. Van Reeth, the first Bishop of Galle. During Father A. S tache's period the first prize distribution took place. It was held on 21 December 1902 and the Government Agent, G. S. Saxton presided the occasion. A drama which was named as "The Invisible Hand" staged for this occasion. Stache served as the manager of the school until 1904.

In 1904, Stache left and Rev. Father Francis De Hert took his place as the fourth manager of the college. In 1907 P. S. M. Perera was appointed as the head master of the college. Perera served as the head master for 34 years. During his period W. K. Stephen Jayasekara, P. D. Vincent, Mrs. Rodrigoo, Joyachim, Gnanapragasam, Rodrigoo served as teachers. De Hert worked as the manager of college until 1909.

Rev. Father Peter Wallyn, the founder of the school returned to Ratnapura from Balangoda on 19 January 1910 and assumed duties as the fifth manager of the school. In this period the annual celebration of Old Boys Association was held in grand level. There were some priests to help Father Wallyn. Two of them were Rev. Father E. Gaspard and Rev. Father C. Louwers who started the boarding house at the school. Wallyn died whilst on a holiday in Nuwara-Eliya on 22 November 1922.

After the death of Wallyn Rev. Father L. Spillbout became the sixth manager of the Aloysius' School. Under his management many improvements took place. He built a part of the present college building (Ground Floor) and named Wallyn Memorial Hall to respect the founder of the school Father Wallyn. He also responsible for the erection of two-story college hostel which can accommodate about 100 boarders. During his period the first inter-school champion trophy which was organized by the government agent on the occasion of his majesty's birthday won by St. Aloysius and this win continued for eleven years. The opening of Convent of Child Jesus and transferring the girls to the new institute also took place. Spillbout changed the school colours from green and gold to blue and silver and the school motto which was "Union is the Strength" to "Age Quod Agis" during this period. The Governor of Sri Lanka Sir Herbert Stanley also visited the school and spoke very highly about the school and the staff, the discipline and the smart of the students of the school.

Spillbout left the school in December 1929 to Kegalle and Rev. Father N. M. Lodadio became the seventh manager. He understood the students' accommodation problem and converted school into two-story building as a solution and included a library for use of the teachers. Lodadio was elevated to Bishop of Galle on 28 May 1934 and left the school on 15 July 1934.

On 29 June 1934 Rev. Father L. Melpingnano was appointed as the eighth Manager of St. Aloysius' College. During Melpignano's tenure, he provided the physics and chemistry laboratories for the students and also broadened the playground and extended the college buildings. In 1946 the magnificent Gem-Lit Night Carnival was held. It was the first night carnival in Ratnapura and again the second night carnival held in August 1948 which was named as Jubilee Pageant.

St. Aloysius' College was designated as a National School by the Sri Lankan Government in the early 2000s.
