= Madina Central College =

K/ Madina National School, Madawala, Kandy
- Madawala Madina
- Kandy; Kandy, Madawala, Central

Information
- Type: Government
- Motto: Rabbi Zidni Ilma
- Religious affiliation: Islam
- Established: 02.12.1935
- Founder: Abubakkar Lebbai Sayyadhu Mohammed
- Principal: S A C M Jibreel
- Staff: 76
- Grades: 06 - 13
- Years offered: 84
- Gender: Male, Female
- Age: 11 to 18
- Enrollment: 3150
- Language: Tamil, English
- Hours in school day: 6
- Houses: Safa; Hira; Mina
- Colours: Maroon, Green, and Blue
- Sports: Cricket Rugby

Madina National School (Sinhala: මදීනා ජාතික පාසල; Tamil: மதீனா தேசிய கல்லூரி; also referred to as Madawala Madina) is a Mixed Primary and Secondary National School in Madawala, Kandy, Central Province, Sri Lanka. It was established on 2 December 1935 with Abubakkar Lebbai Sayyadhu Mohammed as the founding Principal.

It provides education from Grades 01 to 13 in Tamil and English languages. It is one of the leading mixed Tamil medium schools in the country. Located on the Katugastota-Bambarella (B205) main road.

== History ==
In the 1930s, a revolutionary thinker and social worker, Abubakkar Lebbai Sayyadhu Mohammed, established the school on 12 February 1935. The first principal was A.K. Subramaniyam. During its early stages, admission was only granted to boys. At the beginning, there were three teachers and 36 students. In 1936, the school was improved with an addition of one teacher (four total) and 170 students (215 total). In 1937, a Teachers and Parents Association was created. In 1944, S.S.C classes began. In 1948, with 423 students and 15 teachers, a new block was constructed.

In 1952 the school was divided in two as upper school and lower school and had 14 classes. In 1958, girls were allowed to join the school. During that time, the educational minister Dasanayaka constructed a new block to the school. In 1994, the school was announced as a national school. The principal was A.H.M. Siddeek (1997–2008). In 2003, a building was constructed with a new block and was separated for the English Medium.

An auditorium was opened in 2004 in memory of M. H. M. Ashraff, who was the founder of Sri Lanka Muslim Congress.

== Past Principals ==
Name	Year
A.K.Subramaniyam	1935–1941
P.Raayappu	1941–1949
K.Raajasingam	1949–1951
M.A.Raheed	1951-1951
M.S.M.Ismail	1951–1959
M.I.M.Sarib	1959–1961
M.Y.M.Muslim	1961–1962
Zaani Mohammed	1962-1962
R.D.Saldeen	1963–1965
S.M.Thaha	1965–1968
A.R.M.Faaruk	1968–1979
S.M.Thaha	1979–1984
A.R.M.Faaruk	1984–1990
J.M.Munawwar	1990–1997
M.S.M.Lukmaan	1997-1997
A.H.M.Siddeek	1997–2008
S.H.M.Ali Jinna	2008-2008
E.F.Nazeer	2008–2010
M.Z.U.Hidhaya	2010–2016
A.H.M.Azeez	2016-2018
Abdul Raheem	2018-To Present

== 2004-present ==
A computer lab was opened in 2004. In the period 2008-2010, Old Boys Association members Alhaj Musni Mulaffar and Alhaj Riffthi Mulaffar donated a bus to the school which was worth 40 lakhs. In the early 2015, a technological laboratory was constructed by the Sri Lankan government led by president Mahinda Rajapaksa.It contains 4 rooms including a math room. It also contains 40 computers.
