= Puttalam Hindu Central College =

School in North Western Province, Sri Lanka

- புத்தளம் இந்து மத்திய கல்லூரி
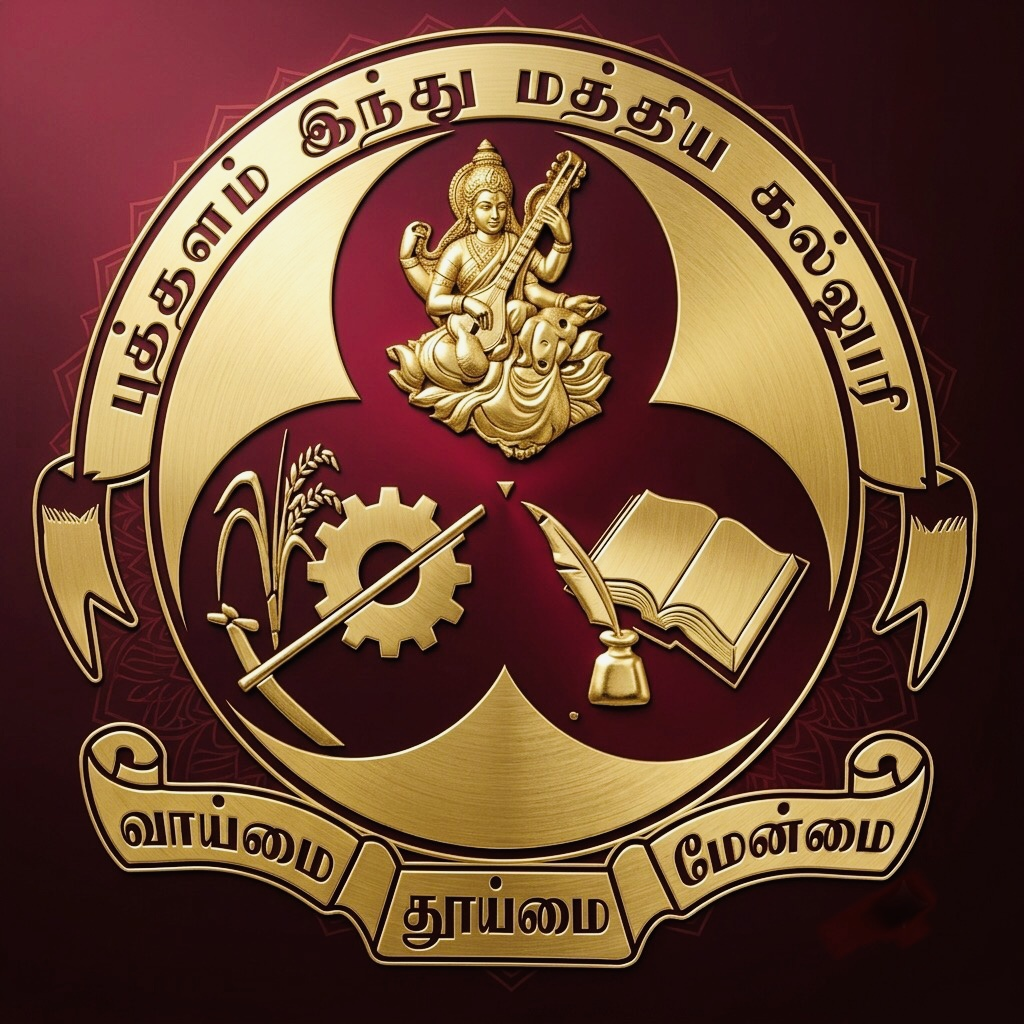
- Puttalam Hindu Central College

Location
- Kurunegala Road; Hindu, Muslim, Catholic; Puttalam, Puttalam District, North Western Province; Sri Lanka

Information
- Type: Public national
- Motto: வாய்மை,தூய்மை,மேன்மை (Sincerity, Purity, Superiority)
- Founded: 1979
- Founder: Late Nadaraja Devar and Late Ratnasingam
- School district: Puttalam Education Zone
- Authority: Ministry of Education
- Category: 1C
- Principal: P.R.Thampythurai
- Grades: 1-13
- Gender: Mixed
- Age range: 6-18
- Language: Tamil
- Houses: Navalar, Valluvar, Nadarajar
- Colours: Maroon & Yellow
- Slogan: வாய்மை,தூய்மை,மேன்மை
- Song: “Puttalam Hindu Tamil kalai Koodam”
- Sports: Cricket
- Nickname: PHCC/Hindus/Hinduits
- Publication: Silver Jubilee Book
- Communities served: School Development Society-SDS Old Students Association-OBA
- Alumni: M.F.Rinsad Ahamed (Mayor-Puttalam Municipal Council

Puttalam Hindu Central College (Tamil: புத்தளம் இந்து மத்திய கல்லூரி Puttaḷam Hindu Maththiya Kalloori, PHCC) is a national school in Puttalam, Sri Lanka It was founded in 1979 by the late Nadaraja Devar and the late Ratnasingam.

== History ==
founded in 1979 by the late Nadaraja Devar and the late Ratnasingam. Puttalam Hindu Maha Saba(இந்து மகா சபை) also contribute to of founding the school. Early Called Hindu Tamil Maha Vidyalayam(இந்து தமிழ் மகா வித்தியாலயம்) After Change to Hindu Central College On Silver Jubilee. (Note: As the college grew, it faced a crisis in 1984 due to inadequate infrastructure but the Socialists donated to build again. in between day’s of school was transferred to hindu Maha saba) As the college grew, it faced a major crisis in 1984 due to inadequate infrastructure.But fortunately at that time Socialists donated to build again.

== Principals ==
•Mr.V.Kaileshwaren 21.01.1979-31.12.1981 & 16.10.1982-20.02.1985

•Mr.Shanmuganathan 18.01.1982-15.10.1982

•Mr.Sriskandaraja 16.10.1982-20.02.1985

•Mr.V.Nadaraja 04.05.1988-16.12.1996

•Mr.V.Sriramachandran 21.02.1985-17.12.1985 & 17.12.1996-09.03.1998

•Mr.M.Nagarajah 11.03.1998-23.01.2004 & 01.01.2005-24.04.2016

•Mrs.Sugunanithy Sriramachmadran 22.01.2004-31.12.2004

•Mrs.Jeyanthi Permampalam 25.04.2016

•Mr.P.R.Thampythurai Current

== Students Union's ==
•Maths Students Union

•Science Union

•Tamil students forum

== Notable Ceremonies & Events ==
•Silver Jubilee Anniversary-2004

•Vaani Vizha-Student's Cultural Programs(Every Year)

•Meendum Palliku Pogalam - Old Students Reunited-2018

•Maths Day Event-(Every Year)

•Moovendhar Vizha -Tamil Exhibition-2007

•Clash Of Hindus (Inter Batch Cricket Tournament)

== Clash Of Hindus ==
the clash of Hindus cricket tournament is battle of batches of Hindu central college old students. The tournament organized by 2015 A/L Batch Called Slammers.season 1 planned for 1st & 2nd August 2026. 20 Batches participated in tournament.

Results
Seasons	Champions	Runners Up
2026	Squad 99	Hiduites

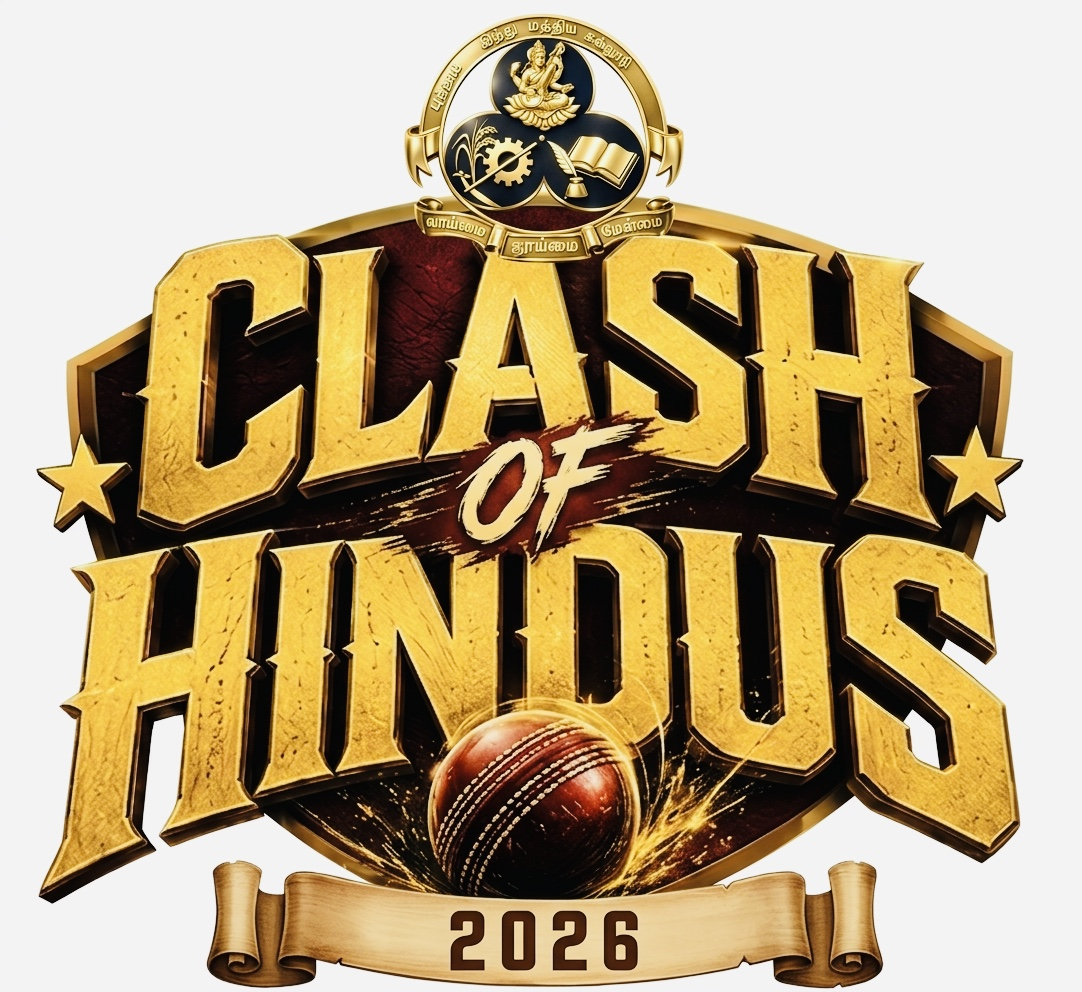
Inter batch cricket tournament of Puttalam Hindu central college
