= Madawala =

- Town
- Location within Sri Lanka
- Coordinates: 7.328331°N 80.673552°E
- Country: Sri Lanka
- Province: Central Province
- District: Kandy District
- Time zone: UTC+5:30 (Sri Lanka Standard Time Zone)

Madawala is a Town in the Central Province of Sri Lanka.

Madawala is popular for its Madina National School or also known as Madina Central College, is one of the leading Tamil/English medium schools in Sri Lanka, which is situated in this village.

Madawala Bazaar is a Village situated in Kandy District with a population of all kind of activists with Professionals and Businessmen. Sri Lanka's most highlighted Author & Reporter, Mr.Latheef Farook, was born in this Village, with Sri Lanka's Prime inventor of Mineral products, Late Alhaj Azeez Muhammedh Rauf, was also born in Madawala Bazaar. The other highlighted professionals such, as School Teachers, Leading Lawyers such as Mr.Faiz Musthafa, Mr.Ahmed Jameel, and Late Dr. Lafeer was born in Madawala Bazaar.

Madawala has come into spotlight mainly due to the negative events such as the event that took place in the year 1999 when the opposing political factions took up arms to fight against each other which was only stopped when the Government forces intervened and the more recent event in 2001 where 10 Muslim boys who supported the Sri Lanka Muslim Congress were shot dead by then Government Party activists.

Recently, the Ashraff Memorial Building was built in the grounds of Madawala Madina Central college (http://madinacc.sch.lk) in memory of M. H. M. Ashraff, who was the founder of the Sri Lanka Muslim Congress. This area is well linked with the Kandy city by a good road network.

== See also ==
- Bazaar
