= D. S. Senanayake Central College =

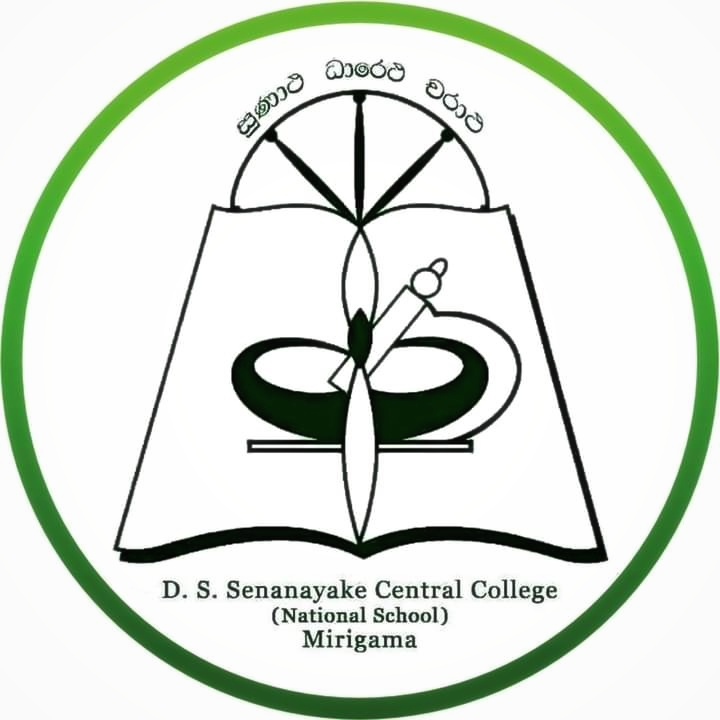

Location
- Mirigama; Gampaha; Sri Lanka
- Coordinates: 7°14′26.15″N 80°7′27.4″E

Information
- School type: National 1AB
- Motto: Sinhala: සුණාථ.. ධාරෙථ.. චරාථ..
- Religious affiliation(s): Buddhism
- Established: 19 February 1951; 74 years ago
- Founder: D. S. Senanayake
- School district: Gampaha District
- School code: DSSCC/ DS
- Principal: U. K. Karunarathne
- Staff: 130
- Grades: 6 - 13
- Gender: Mixed
- Age range: 11-19
- Enrollment: 2,500+
- Language: Sinhala, English
- Campus size: 10 ha (25 acres)
- Campus type: Urban
- Colour(s): Green and yellow
- Team name: Senanayakenz
- Affiliation: Ministry of Education
- Website: https://dssmirigama.schweb.lk/
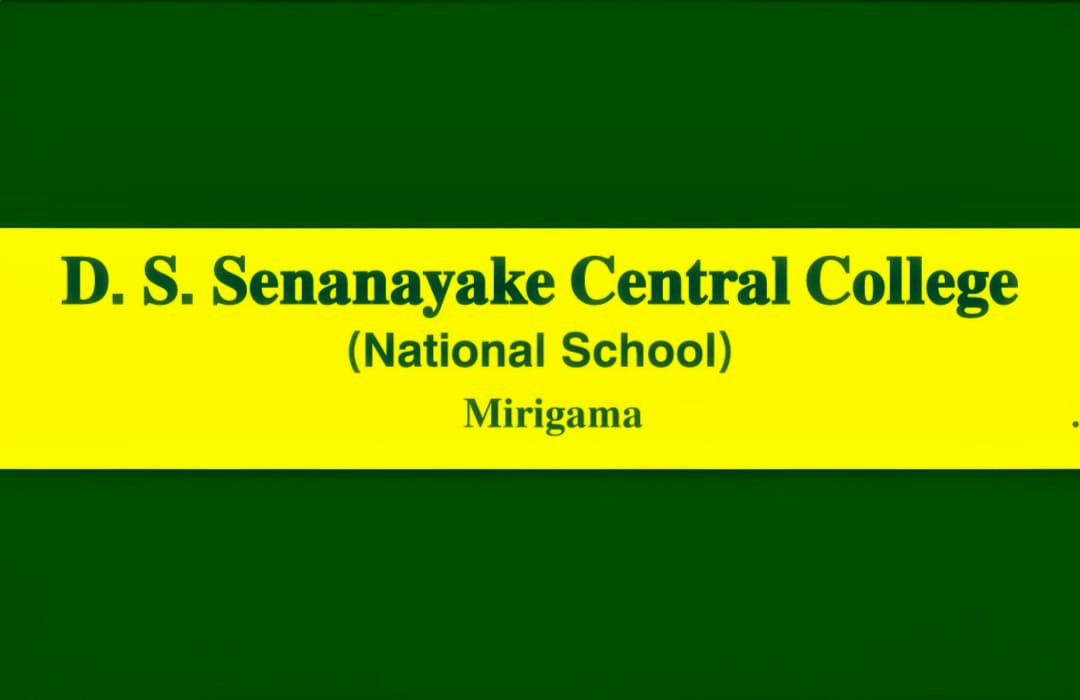
- D. S. Senanayake Central College Flag

D. S. Senanayake Central College (Sinhala: ඩී.ඇස්. සේනානායක මධ්‍ය විද්‍යාලය - මීරිගම) is a national secondary school located in Mirigama, Western Province, Sri Lanka.

== History ==
On 19 February 1951 Prime Minister D. S. Senanayake laid the foundation stone for the school on a 11 ha (26 acres) site, near the Mirigama railway station.

Weweldeniye Medhalankara Thero took the initiative to establish this school and provide higher education for the students in the area.

The school was established with a two-storey building and other facilities, with an enrolment of 600 students and 25 teachers. The first principal was F. D. Wijesinghe and the new school was called Mirigama College.

In 1955 the school was further developed by the principal, H. Welikanna. Under his guidance the school became all island volleyball champions and athletes, G.C.E A/L classes were commenced and the number of students increased gradually. In 1958 the first students from the school obtained their university entrance.

In 1959 the name of the school was changed to Mirigama Maha Vidyalaya and Hubert Karunarathna was appointed as the principal.

In 1964 D. A. Jayathilaka assumed the position as the school's principal. A number of new buildings were constructed, and A/L classes were commenced in science and commerce streams. In 1969 the school was expanded with an additional 2 ha (4.9 acres) of playing fields, which were opened by Prime Minister Dudley Senanayake.

W. R. Karunarathna became the principal in 1978. The school was promoted to a central college in June 1979 and was renamed D. S. Senanayaka Central College as a tribute to the country's first Prime Minister, D. S. Senanayake. In January 1868 the school was converted into a Cluster - Core School.

Every pupil is entered to the college who passes the Grade 5 Scholarship Examination or G.C.E(O/L) Examination with highest results.

Currently D. S. Senanayaka Central College has about 2,500 students enrolled from grade 6 to G.C.E A/L and an academic staff of 125.

== Principals ==
- K. P. Pagngnaratne : 1947 - 1952
- F. D. Wijesinghe : 1953 - 1955
- Hemachandra Welikanne : 1955 - 1960
- Hurbert Karunarathne : 1961 - 1963
- D. A. Jaysthilake : 1964 - 1969
- P. P. D. T. Aquinas : 1970 - 1972
- D. A. Perera : 1972 - 1974
- G. D. Francis : 1974 - 1975
- R. A. K. Rajapakse : 1975 - 1976
- C. C. Manamperi : 1976
- G. S. Leelananda : 1977
- W. R. Karunarathne : 1977 - 1988
- T. K. Ariyawanse : 1989 - 1992
- D. G. I. Thilakawardana : 1992 - 2007
- Makkanigoda Assaji Thero : 2008 - 2014
- Sunil Karunathilake : 2014-2020
- U. K. Karunarathne : 2020-present

== Houses ==
Students are placed in one of four houses according to their admission number. They compete in annual inter-house competitions.

- Wijaya (Sinhala: විජය)
- Gajaba (Sinhala: ගජබා)
- Thissa (Sinhala: තිස්ස)
- Gamunu (Sinhala: ගමුණු)
