= Central University =

Central University may mean:

- Central university (India), one of the government-designated universities in India
- Central University (Colombia), a university in Colombia
- Dhaka Central University, a proposed public university consisting of seven colleges
- National Central University, Taiwan
- National Central University, former name of Nanjing University
- Central University of Ecuador, a university in Ecuador
- Central University of Chile, a private university in Chile
- Central Philippine University, Jaro, Iloilo, Philippines
- Manila Central University, Caloocan City, Philippines
- Central University of Kentucky, Richmond, Kentucky, merged with Centre College in 1901.
- Central University (Ghana), a university in Ghana
- Central University of Iowa, former name of Central College (Iowa)

== See also ==
- Central College (disambiguation)
- Central State (disambiguation)
- 中央大學 (disambiguation)
