= Kattankudy =

Kattankudy காத்தான்குடி කාත්තාන්කුඩි
- Town
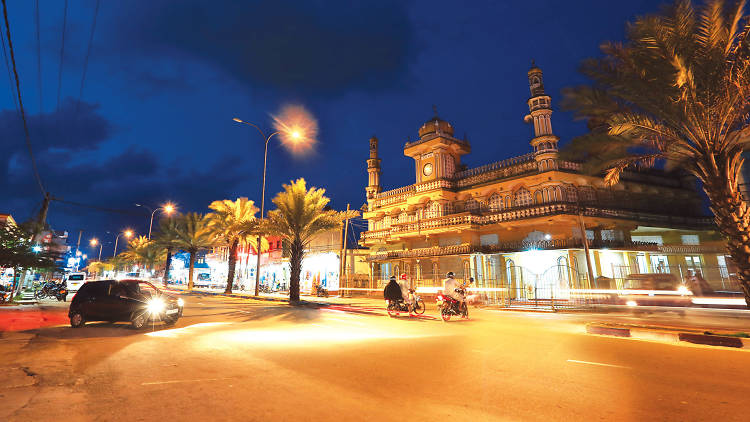
- The bazaar strip along the road

- Location within Sri Lanka
- Coordinates: 7°40′49″N 81°43′34″E
- Country: Sri Lanka
- Province: Eastern
- District: Batticaloa
- DS Division: Kattankudy
- Postal Code: 30100

Government
  - Type: Urban Council

Population (2014)
  - Total: 47,603
- Time zone: UTC+5:30 (Sri Lanka Standard Time Zone)
- Website: kattankudy.uc.gov.lk kattankudy.ds.gov.lk

Kattankudy (Tamil: காத்தான்குடி, Sinhala: කාත්තාන්කුඩි; also transliterated as "Kathankudy") is a township near the city of Batticaloa on the eastern coast of Sri Lanka. The town's population is predominantly Muslim.

Most of the people are engaged in business, industries and fisheries. The division of Kattankudy occupies the central part of the district. It covers land area of approximately 2.56 km^{2} (0.99 sq mi) and 1.33 km^{2} (0.51 sq mi) of inland waterways. The division accounts for 0.15% of the district's total land area.

== Boundaries ==
North : Manmunai North Divisional secretariat.

East : Bay of Bengal (Sea).

South : Manmunaipattu Divisional Secretariat.

West : Batticaloa Lagoon.

== Demographics ==
Kattankudy is one of the many Moorish (Muslim)-dominated towns in Sri Lanka.

Ethnicity in Kattankudy Urban Council
Ethnicity	Population	% of total
Moors	40,124	98.01
Indian Tamils	153	0.80
Sinhalese	36	0.05
Sri Lankan Tamils	20	0.02
Other (including Burgher, Malay)	23	0.02
Total	40,356	100

Religion in Kattankudy Urban Council
Religion	2012	Percentage
Muslim	40,254	98.01%
Hindu	50	0.49%
Buddhist	38	0.39%
Roman Catholic	11	0.12%
Other	01	0.01%
Total	40,356	100.0%

Source:statistics.gov. lk

== GS Divisions and Population (2014) ==
GS Number	Area	Total Families	Population
162	Kattankudy-6	922	3049
162A	Kattankudy-6 South	921	3218
162B	Kattankudy-6 West	622	2121
164	Kattankudy-4	376	1295
164A	Kattankudy-5	631	2195
164B	Kattankudy-5 South	303	982
164C	Kattankudy-5 West	440	1532
165	Kattankudy-3	458	1387
165A	Kattankudy-3 West	318	955
165B	Kattankudy-3 East	421	1422
166	Kattankudy-2	671	2345
166A	Kattankudy-2 North	777	2685
167	Kattankudy-1	353	1178
167A	New Kattankudy North	1624	5429
167B	New Kattankudy East	2016	7847
167C	New Kattankudy South	1567	5485
167D	New Kattankudy West	697	2429
167E	Kattankudy-1 South	641	2052

Source: http://www.kattankudy.ds.gov.lk

== Kattankudy Mosque Massacre ==
Kattankudy Mosque Massacre was the killing of over 147 Muslim men and boys in a mosque in Kattankudy by armed men on 3 August 1990. It took place when around 30 armed men raided four mosques in the town of Kattankudy, where over 300 people were prostrating in Isha prayers. The attack is attributed to LTTE by the Sri Lankan Government, although the former denied involvement in the massacre, and have never retracted that denial. The initial report put the death toll at around 100, but as many of the injured who were rushed to hospital succumbed to their injuries, the final death toll rose to over 147.

== Tsunami 2004 ==
When the 2004 tsunami hit, approximately 108 people died in Kattankudy and 93 persons are still listed as missing. Around 2,500 houses were damaged by the tsunami in Kattankudy.

== See also ==
- Kattankudi Urban Council
- Kattankudy Central College
