= Kattankudi Urban Council =

Kattankudy Urban Council

Type
- Type: Local authority

Leadership
- Chairman: Sahul Hameed Muhammadu Asfar, (SLMC) since 6 May 2025
- Deputy Chairman: Muhammadu Iburahim Muhammadu Jezeem, (SLMC) since 6 May 2025

Structure
- Seats: 18
- Political groups: Government: SLMC (10); Opposition: NPP (3); UNP(NFGG) (1); Independent (1); SLLP (1); SJB (1); NLBP (1)

Elections
- Last election: 6 May 2025
- Next election: TBA

Kattankudy Urban Council (KUC) is the local authority for the town of Kattankudy in eastern Sri Lanka. KUC is responsible for providing a variety of local public services including roads, sanitation, sewerage, housing, libraries, public parks and recreational facilities. The council comprises 9 members elected via the open list proportional representation system.

== Election results ==
=== 2006 local government election ===
Results of the local government election held on 20 May 2006:

Alliances and parties	Votes	%	Seats
Independent 6 (Sri Lanka Muslim Congress)	8,909	55.62%	6
Independent 3	3,223	20.12%	1
United People's Freedom Alliance (NUA, SLFP et al.)	2,486	15.52%	1
National Congress	968	6.04%	1
Independent 1	251	1.57%	0
United National Party	138	0.86%	0'
Independent 4	24	0.15%	0
Independent 2	11	0.07%	0
Independent 5	8	0.05%	0
Valid Votes	16,018	100.00%	9
Rejected Votes	668		
Total Polled	16,686		
Registered Electors	24,370		
Turnout	68.47%		

The following candidates were elected: Sahul Hameed Mohamed Asfer (SLMC); Aliyar Lebbe Abdul Jawath (SLMC); Meera Mohaideen Kalanther Lebbe (SLMC); Ahamed Lebbe Mohamed Marzook (SLMC); Umar Lebbe Mohamed Noorul Mubeen (SLMC); Abdul Majeedu Mohamadu Rauffu (UPFA); Abdul Azeez Mohamed Rooby (NC); Atham Lebbe Mohamed Saleem (SLMC); and Abdul Sathar Muhammed Zulfi (Ind 3).

Aliyar Lebbe Abdul Jawath (SLMC) and Umar Lebbe Mohamed Noorul Mubeen (SLMC) were appointed Chairman and Deputy Chairman respectively.

The term of the council was due to expire in 2010 but on 22 December 2009 Minister of Local Government and Provincial Councils Janaka Bandara Tennakoon extended it until 31 March 2011.

=== 2011 local government election ===
Results of the local government election held on 17 March 2011:

Alliances and parties	Votes	%	Seats
United People's Freedom Alliance (NC, ACMC, SLFP et al.)	10,357	53.12%	6
Independent 1	6,809	34.92%	2
Sri Lanka Muslim Congress	1,429	7.33%	1
United National Party	337	1.73%	0
Independent 6	324	1.66%	0
Independent 14	146	0.75%	0
Independent 3	30	0.15%	0
Janatha Vimukthi Peramuna	24	0.12%	0
Independent 4	24	0.12%	0
Independent 12	6	0.03%	0
Independent 2	3	0.02%	0
Independent 7	3	0.02%	0
Independent 8	2	0.01%	0
Independent 13	2	0.01%	0
Independent 5	1	0.01%	0
Independent 9	1	0.00%	0
Independent 10	1	0.00%	0
Independent 11	0	0.00%	0
Valid Votes	19,499	100.00%	9
Rejected Votes	381		
Total Polled	19,880		
Registered Electors	26,454		
Turnout	75.15%		

The following candidates were elected: Hayathu Mohamed Mohamed Bakkir; Asfar Mohamed Shahul Hameed (UPFA); Abdul Gafoor Muhamathu Haroon; Mohamed Ibraheem Mohamed Jaseem (UPFA); Mohamed Musthafa Abdul Latheef; Muhamathu Musthafa Abdul Rahuman; Abdul Majeed Mohamed Rauff; Ameer hamsa Ummu Salma; and Mohamed Sudeek Mohamed Siyad.

Asfar Mohamed Shahul Hameed (UPFA) and Mohamed Ibraheem Mohamed Jaseem (UPFA) were appointed Chairman and Deputy Chairman respectively.
