= Holy Family Convent, Jaffna =

Holy Family Convent

Location
- Vembady Road; Jaffna, Jaffna District, Northern Province; Sri Lanka; 9°39′35.70″N 80°01′12.20″E

Information
- School type: National School 1AB
- Motto: Glory to God Alone
- Founded: 1845; 181 years ago
- School district: Jaffna Education Zone
- Authority: Northern Provincial Council
- School number: 1001003
- Principal: Rev. Sr. Mariaseeli Mariyathas
- Teaching staff: 114
- Grades: 1-13
- Gender: Girls
- Age range: 5-18

Holy Family Convent is a national school in Jaffna, Sri Lanka. The school was established in 1845 and consists of both a Tamil and an English convent.

== History ==
The school was first managed by an Irish lady called Mrs. Flannagan with the aim of providing English education to the girls in Jaffna. In 1862, the school was taken over by the Sisters of the Holy Family and became the first convent school on the island.

A nunnery exists behind the convent. St. Henry's college is also in Ilavalai, Jaffna and is the Roman Catholic school for Tamil boys.

On Good Friday 1987, the school was severely damaged in an air raid by the Sri Lankan Air Force targeting Tamil Tigers.

In 2002, it was amalgamated with the Tamil Convent Mahavidyalayam and in 2010 it was upgrade as a national school. Currently, it has a student population of 2000 and a teaching staff 76.

== Notable alumni ==
- Mathangi "Maya" Arulpragasam (known as M.I.A.) - British artist

== See also ==
- List of schools in Northern Province, Sri Lanka
