= Telijjawila Central College =

- තෙලිජ්ජවිල මධ්‍ය විද්‍යාලය

Location
- Matara, Thelijjawila, Southern Province; Sri Lanka; 6°01′10″N 80°29′31″E

Information
- Type: National.
- Motto: Nasathi Vidya Samam Mithram (නාසති විද්‍යා සමං මිත්‍රම්)
- Religious affiliation: Buddhist
- Established: 1946; 80 years ago
- Founder: C. W. W. Kannangara
- Principal: Mr. J. Uyangoda
- Grades: 6–13
- Gender: Mixed
- Enrollment: 2500
- Language: Sinhala, English
- Colors: Maroon and gold
- Song: ලකඹර ජය දද නැංවූ මාතා
- Website: Telijjawila Central College

Telijjawila Central College (Sinhala: තෙලිජ්ජවිල මධ්‍ය විද්‍යාලය) is a government school for boys and girls in Telijjawila Matara, Sri Lanka. The college is situated in a hilly area, close to Weligama Akuressa main road with natural surroundings. The college was initially founded as a Buddhist school in 1954 in its present location and on 31 January 1996 declared a National school. The college consists of over 2500 student population with children studying from primary level to secondary level education with a faculty of 130 teachers.

== School history ==
The college functioned in this premises until 1955 during which year it was shifted to the present location at Udukawa the hillock facing the paddy fields with a rich scenic beauty.

A Central college for Telijjawila, under the scheme for taking education to the village, by the late Dr. C. W. W. Kannangara, would not have been a reality, if not for the great efforts made by the late David Wanigasekara, and Pujya. Naranda Thero of, Wajiraramaya, Bambalapitiya.

The college commenced its operation on 17 January 1946 at Telijjawila junction, in a small building, thatched with coconut leaves. It had nearly 200 students and the staff consisted of three teachers. The pioneer teachers were DH Wickramasekara and UA Podinona. The first principal was HL Wimalasuriya from Gnanodaya Maha Vidyalaya at Kalutara.

Wickramaratne Walawwa was used as the boys' hostel and Girls' was established at Samarasinghe Walawwa in Bibugodella watta.

Despite a shortage of buildings and other facilities, the school quickly became well-known and one of the best schools in Ceylon, The medium of instruction was English till 1956. The school was declared open during the tenure of principal RB Gallella on 15 July 1955, by the then Hon. Prime Minister Sir John Kotalawala. He was a prominent educationalist and a disciplinarian who won the hearts of all students. And served until he was transferred to Maho Central College in February 1957.

In 1948, the school moved to new buildings constructed on land acquired by the government, to its present location, which consisted of an assembly hall, classrooms, administrative blocks, crafts rooms, and two hostel blocks.

== Past Principals from 1946 ==
No.	Period	Name
1	17.01.1946 - 31.05.1948	Mr. H.L. Wimalasooriya
2	01.06.1948 - 05.02.1949	Mr. Edmond Dias Gunarathne
3	February 1949 - March 1951	Mr. M.A. de Silva
(Acting)	March to October 1951	Mr. G. Tanthirigoda
4	October 1951 - August 1952	Mr. H.L. Rathnapala
5	12.05.1952 - 24.04.1955	Mr. D.A. Wedage
6	25.04.1955 - 01.02.1957	Mr. R.B. Gallella
7	01.02.1957 - 30.09.1968	Mr. L.H.P. De Silva
8	10.10.1968 - 16.07.1970	Mr. U.A.F. Dharmasiri
9	16.07.1970 - 25.09.1973	Mr. N.G.K. Samarasekara
10	25.09.1973 - 02.06.1975	Mr. R.A. Mathos
11	02.06.1975 - 08.07.1977	Mr. N.A. Gunadasa
12	08.07.1977 - 26.02.1980	Mr. C.K. Waidyarathna
13	27.02.1980 - 05.01.1981	Mr. P.V.P. Wickramasingha
14	05.01.1981 - 14.01.1986	Mr. M.K. Sirisena
15	15.01.1986 - 05.06.1988	Mr. N. Jayawardana
16	16.06.1988 - 11.09.1988	Mr. J.P.P. Jayaweera
17	13.09.1988 - 04.05.1992	Mr. A. Gamage
18	04.05.1992 - 01.04.1993	Mr. I. Wijewantha
19	01.04.1993 - 07.10.1994	Mr. W. Chittananda
20	07.10.1994 - 26.11.2002	Mr.P.V.P.Wickramasingha
21	25.08.2003 - 25.08.2004	Mr. Cyril.T.Gunawardana
22	05.11.2004 - 31.01.2006	Mr. Rohana Deraniyagala
23	31.01.2006 - 2017	Mr. Wimal Vidanapathirana
24	2017 - 2024	Mr. Jayantha Meegoda
25	2024 - now	Mr. J. Uyangoda

== Notable alumni ==
Name	Notability
Mahinda Yapa Abeywardena	Speaker of the Parliament of Sri Lanka (2020–24)

== Houses ==
There are four student houses in the college. They are:

- Rohana :
- Thissa :
- Anura :
- Vijitha :
