= Weera Keppetipola Central College, Akuramboda =

Keppetipola Central College, Akuramboda.

Location
- Akuramboda, Matale District, Central Province, 21142; Sri Lanka; 7.64596°N 80.60523°E

Information
- School type: National College
- Established: January 6, 1941
- Authority: Ministry of Education
- Specialist: Sports
- Grades: 6 to 13
- Age range: 11 to 18
- Houses: Ramya, Suramya, Saumya
- Colors: maroon, yellow, blue

Keppetipola Central College located in Akuramboda, Matale District, Sri Lanka is a Central College established in 1941 by Hon. Dr. C. W. W. Kannangara.

== History ==
Organized education at Akuramboda dates back to 1853 when a rural school was started with 12 students at the mosque and later shifted to the house of Mr. James Herath of Ehelepola village. In 1925, Mrs. Lewliyadda, a relative of Mr. James Herath donated a land suitable to build a school close to Olaganwatta.

Keppetipola Central College, Akuramboda, established on January 6, 1941, by late Hon. Dr. C. W. W. Kannangara, the Father of Free Education. The college was closed down in 1985 in order to start an army camp in the premises and was reopened on September 9, 1991. The college was declared a National Sports School by the Ministry of Education in 1991.

== Former Principals ==
- S.M. Praghnarathna (1941–1942)
- A.G.G. Perera (1942–1944)
- C. Godage (1944–1949)
- A.K. Jayasekara (1949–1951)
- L. Abeysekara (1951–1954)
- L.L.P. Kabral (1954–1957)
- A. Thilakarathne (1957–1960)
- G.J.D. Silva (1960–1961)
- P.P. Manthilake (1961–1966)
- D.B. Thewarapperuma (1966–1967)
- Y.M. Karunaratne (1967–1968)
- V.W.J. Lokubanda (1968–1971)
- A. Bopitiya (1971–1972)
- B.N. Basnayake (1972–1973)
- N.G. Piyasena (1973–1974)
- C.A.C.B. Silva (1974–1976)
- Rev. P. Chandrananda Thero (1976.01-1976.09)
- C. Basnayake (1976.10-1976.12)
- A.W.B. Thennakoon (1977–1981)
- S.C.C. Wijesinghe (1981–1985)
- [Army camp 1985-1989]
- P.W. Karunthilaka (1991–2007)
- B.A. Sunil Batuwangala (2007–2009)
- Mrs. D.M.Y.Dissanayaka (2009–2013.5)
- D.G.S.Jayasinghe (2013.05 - 2022)
- Jayantha Medawattha (2022-2024)
- A.S.Dissanayake (2024 - 2026.3)
- G.G.J.K.Jayathilaka (2026.3-Present)
