= Eldeniya =

Eldeniya ඇල්දෙණිය
- Village
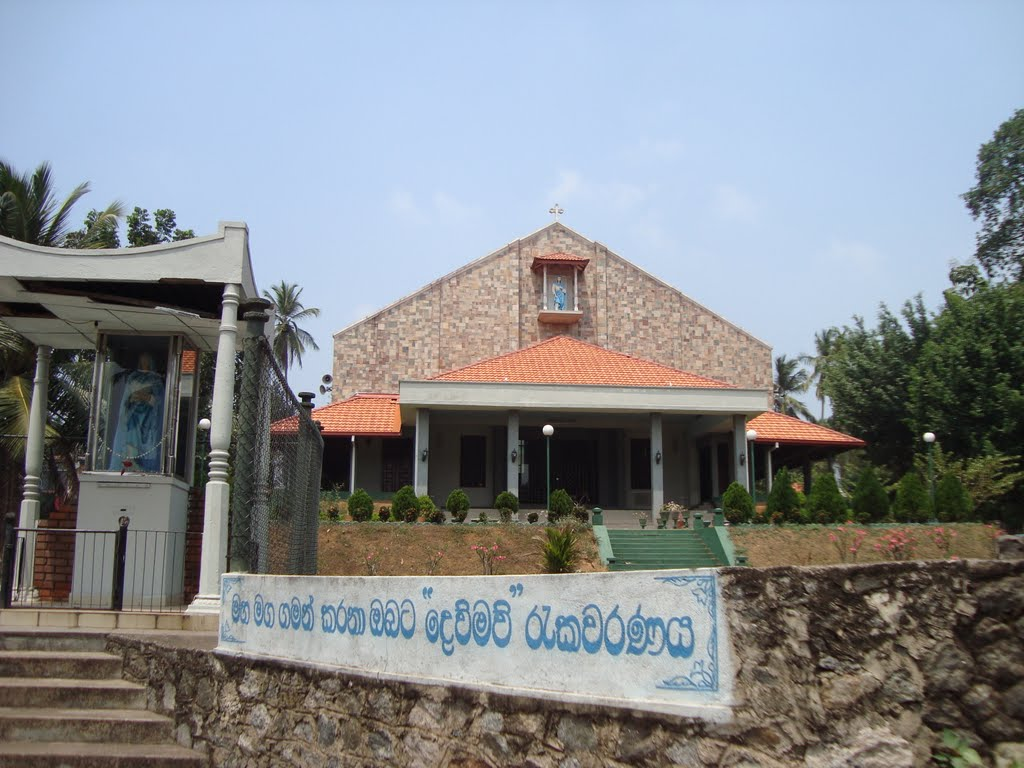
- Holy Mother of Expectation Church, Eldeniya

- Location within Sri Lanka
- Coordinates: 7.0123°N 79.9744°E
- Country: Sri Lanka
- Province: Western Province
- District: Gampaha District

Population
  - Total: 1,500
- Time zone: UTC+5:30 (Sri Lanka Standard Time)

Eldeniya is a village located in Kadawatha, Gampaha District, Sri Lanka.
