= Central College (Texas) =

Coordinates: 31.12027°N 97.81085°W

- San Jacinto Memorial Building at Central Campus
- Type: Community College
- Established: 1914
- Parent institution: Houston Community College
- Chancellor: Cesar Maldonado
- President: Muddassir Siddiqi
- Location: Houston, Texas, United States
- Campus: Urban
- Colours: Black and gold
- Mascot: Eagle
- Website: www.hccs.edu

Central College is a community college based in Houston, Texas. Part of the Houston Community College System, it serves Downtown, Midtown and parts of the Southeast portion of the city. Central College consists of three satellite campuses: Americana Building, Central Campus and Willie Lee Gay Campus.

== History ==
The grounds of the Central College campus were originally built in 1914 to house the South End Junior High School. in 1926, the facility became a high school when the San Jacinto High School opened. Roy Hofheinz attended the high school.

The first post-secondary education at the San Jacinto High School facilities began on March 7, 1927, when Houston Junior College (HJC) was formed and occupied the building. Initially, the campus offered only night courses. Its first session began March 7, 1927, with an enrollment of 232 students and 12 faculty. The institution would later expend on September 19, 1927, to allow all persons having completed the necessary educational requirements to enroll.

On April 30, 1934, Texas governor Miriam A. Ferguson signed House Bill 194 into law which allowed the Houston Junior College to become a four-year university. The junior college renamed itself to the University of Houston (UH) which it has remained since. UH initially held classes at the high school building with an enrollment of 682 until they moved to the South Main Baptist church the following semester. The San Jacinto High School building would continue to hold night classes for the University of Houston through 1939.

In 1970, the San Jacinto High School held its final year as a new institution, the Houston Technical Institute (HTI), would now occupy the building in 1971. The same year, the formation of the Houston Community College was approved by HISD which would share facilities with the district's schools. The first classes at the campus, now named HTI, were held in 1971.

== Campus ==
=== Central Campus ===
The HCC Central Campus is located in Midtown Houston. It is located on the grounds of the former San Jacinto High School and is the flagship campus of HCCS. The campus opened in the 1980s after HCC purchased the school grounds from Houston Independent School District.

=== Americana Building ===
The HCC Americana Building is located in Downtown Houston. It is devoted to continuing education.

=== Willie Lee Gay Campus ===
The HCC Willie Gay Campus (or South Campus) is located in the Southside of Houston, several miles south of the Reliant Park area. The campus opened in 2004.
