= Vigneshwara Maha Vidyalaya =

Vigneshwara Maha Vidyalaya is a school in Trincomalee, founded in 1823 as a primary school by the Methodist church. It was upgraded to a Maha Vidiyalayam in 1979 and 1C grade school in 1981. Vikneshwara Maha Vidyalaya is located on the main street of the town of Trincomalee.
