= Bandaranayake Central College, Veyangoda =

- වේයන්ගොඩ බණ්ඩාරනායක මධ්‍ය විද්‍යාලය
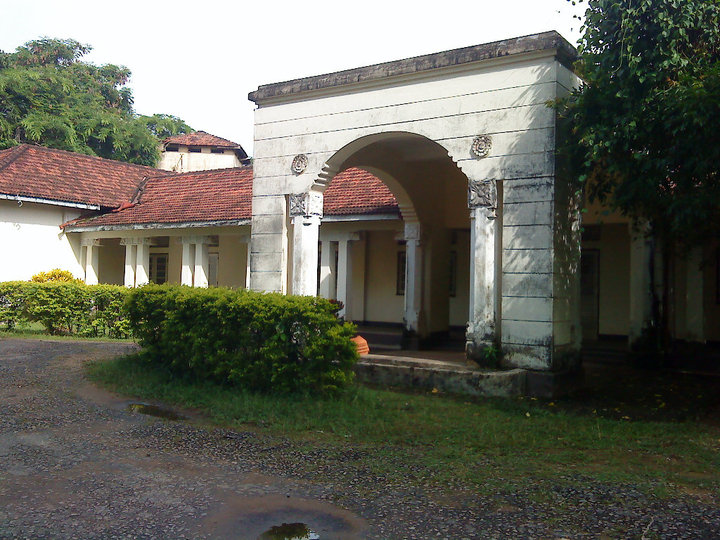

Location
- Bandaranayake Road, Veyangoda; 11100; Sri Lanka; 7°09′55.3″N 80°03′51.3″E

Information
- Other name: Veyangoda Central College
- Type: National school
- Motto: "අත්තාහි අත්තනො නාථො" (One is the refuge of oneself)
- Religious affiliation: Buddhism
- Established: 6 January 1941; 85 years ago
- School district: Gampaha District
- School code: BCCV/ VCC
- Principal: D.H.S.D. Soomarathne
- Staff: 175
- Grades: 6 to 13
- Gender: Boys and Girls
- Age range: 11 - 19
- Enrollment: 3,737
- Campus size: 8.1-hectare (20-acre)
- Campus type: urban
- Colours: Dark green, gold, green
- Team name: Centralionz
- Publication: Smart Valley Sri Lanka
- Website: www.bandaranayakecentralcollege.lk

Bandaranayake Central College, Veyangoda (Sinhala:වේයන්ගොඩ බණ්ඩාරනායක මධ්‍ය විද්‍යාලය), also known as Veyangoda Central College, is a national school in Sri Lanka. The school was originally one of the three first Central Colleges established under the education reforms of late Hon. C. W. W. Kannangara, who introduced free education in Sri Lanka. Today about 3270 students are studying from grade 6 to 13 and academic staff of 175 are engaged in the teaching process.

== History ==
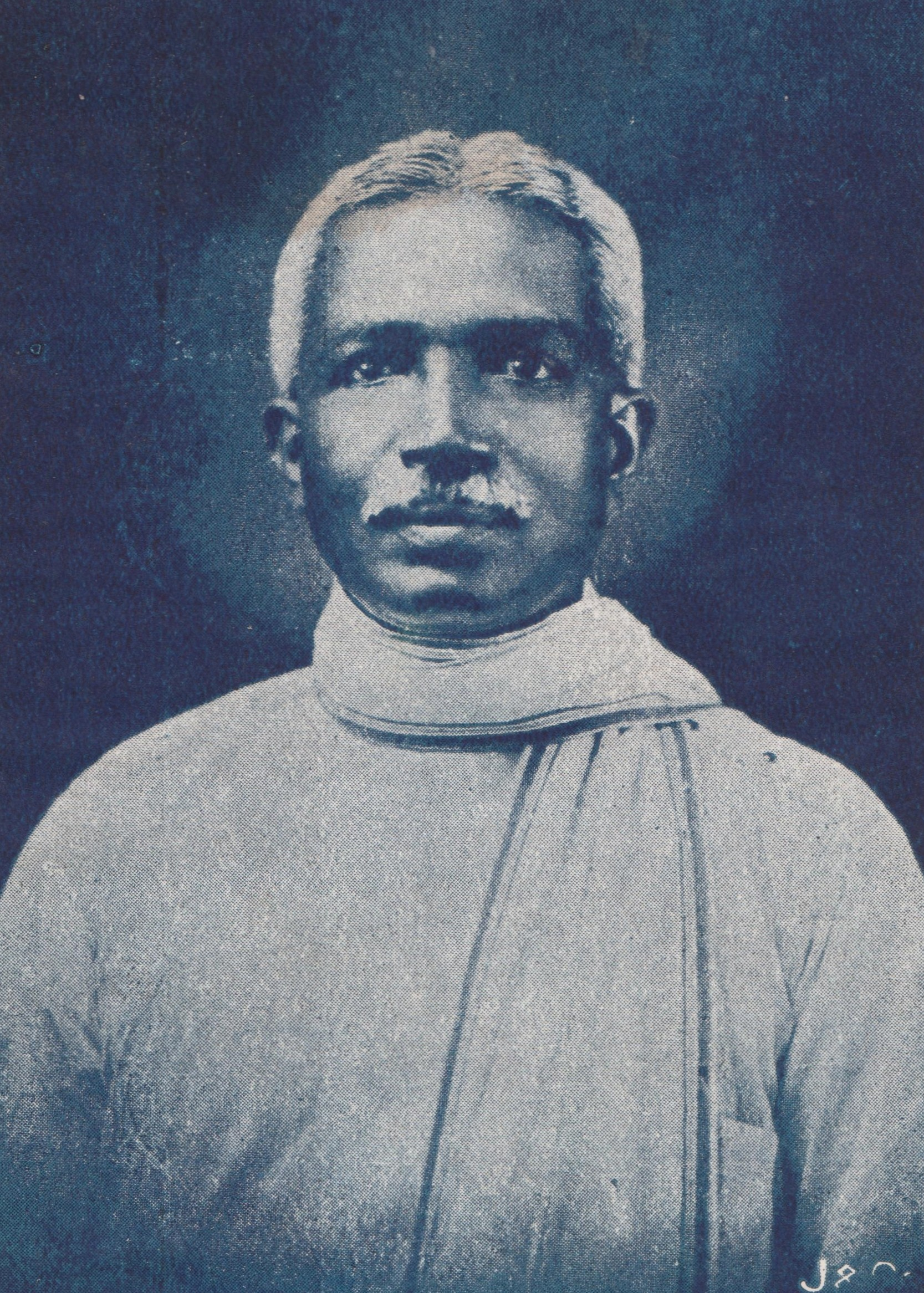

C.W.W Kannangara was Sri Lanka's first Minister of Education.
On 6 January 1941 three central colleges, Veyangoda, Akuramboda, and Weeraketiya were opened by C.W.W Kannangara, Sri Lanka's first Minister of Education. Veyangoda Central College was created by joining three schools. They are Veyangoda Swabasha Patashalawa (Sinhala school), English school and Paththalagethara School which were in the same place where the President College, Veyangoda situated today, in the middle of Veyangoda town.

Later the school was moved into Maligathanna Watta and first building was opened by D. S. Senanayaka on 3 September 1951.

The school originally had 20 classrooms and two hostels, one for girls and one for boys, and two buildings for home science and vocational training. Now there are 51 classrooms, an agriculture unit, a computer resource centre and a computer lab in the college. Every pupil is entered to the college who passes the Grade 5 Scholarship Examination or G.C.E(O/L) Examination with highest results.

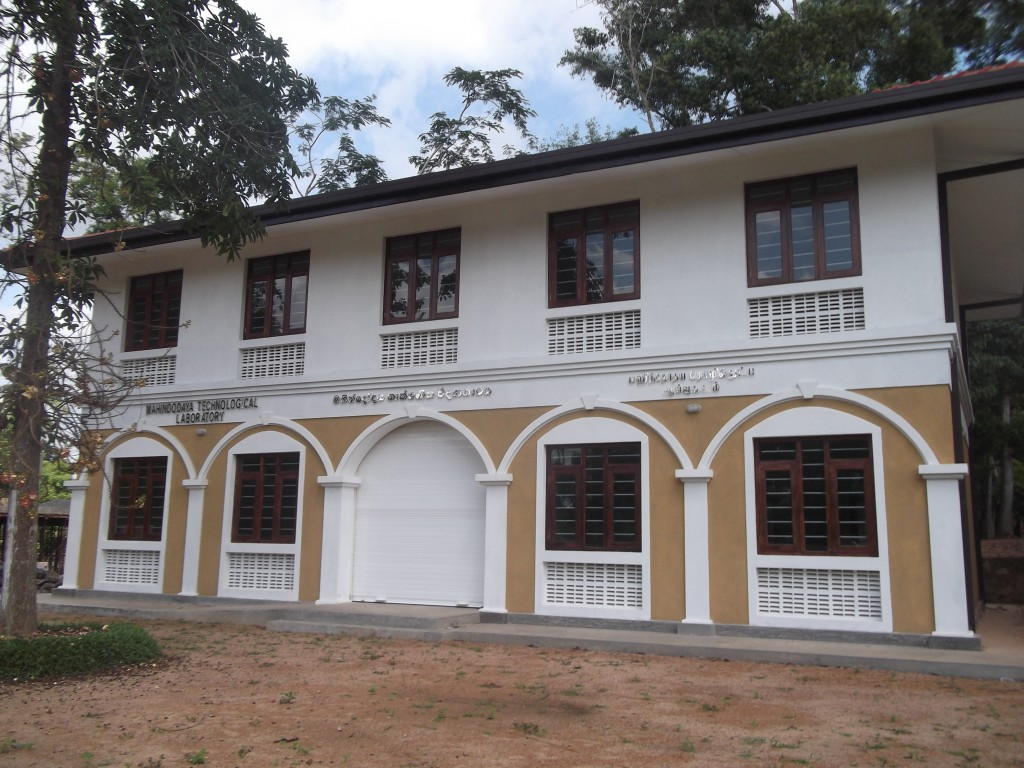
Mahindyodaya Multi-Functional Laboratory
