= Hindi film distribution circuits =

Hindi film distribution circuits comprise territories which have been created by film distributors for releasing Hindi cinema or Hindustani cinema (as it was earlier known) across India. The six distribution circuits were created in 1930s after the advent of the first talkie in 1931. These circuits were:

- Bombay circuit
- Eastern circuit
- Delhi-U.P. circuit,
- C.P.-C.I.-Rajasthan circuit
- Punjab circuit
- South circuit

Presently territories for distribution of Hindi films are divided into eleven territories. These are.

| Circuit name | Comprising territories |
|---|---|
| Bombay circuit | Dadra and Nagar Haveli and Daman and Diu, Gujarat, Goa, Mumbai and parts of Maharashtra and parts of Karnataka. (comprises areas that formed the erstwhile Bombay State and Portuguese-ruled colonies) |
| Delhi circuit | Delhi, Uttar Pradesh and Uttarakhand |
| Nizam circuit | Telangana, parts of Maharashtra and parts of Karnataka. (Comprises areas that formed the erstwhile Nizam State) |
| East Punjab circuit | Chandigarh, Haryana, Himachal Pradesh, Jammu and Kashmir, Ladakh and Punjab, |
| Eastern circuit | Andaman and Nicobar Islands, Arunachal Pradesh, Assam, Bihar Jharkhand, Manipur, Meghalaya, Mizoram, Nagaland, Odisha, Sikkim, Tripura and West Bengal. As well as Bhutan and Nepal. |
| C. P. Berar circuit | Vidarbha region of Maharashtra, Southern and Eastern Madhya Pradesh and Chhattisgarh. (Comprises areas that formed the erstwhile Central Provinces and Berar) |
| Central India circuit | Northern and Western Madhya Pradesh. |
| Rajasthan circuit | Rajasthan |
| Mysore circuit | Bengaluru and parts of Karnataka (Comprises areas that formed the erstwhile Mysore State) |
| Tamil Nadu circuit | Lakshadweep, Kerala, Puducherry and Tamil Nadu |
| Andhra circuit | Andhra Pradesh |

Amongst the above territories Bombay circuit is considered by the distributors as having potential for maximum earnings. An additional territory known as overseas territory also exists. However, Hindi movies in Nepal & Bhutan are released by distributors through the Eastern circuit.
