= Methodist Central College =

School in Batticaloa, Sri Lanka

Location
- Batticaloa, Batticaloa District, Eastern Province, 30000; Sri Lanka
- Coordinates: 7°42′41.40″N 81°41′52.10″E

Information
- Other name: MCC
- School type: Public provincial 1AB
- Mottoes: From darkness towards light
- Religious affiliation: Methodism
- Denomination: Methodist Church in Sri Lanka
- Founded: 29 July 1814; 211 years ago
- Founder: Willium Ault
- School district: Batticaloa Education Zone
- Authority: Eastern Provincial Council
- Principal: R. Baskar
- Chaplain: Rev. Clergy Methodist Church
- Grades: 1-13
- Years offered: 6-19
- Gender: Boys
- Language: Tamil Medium
- Houses: Holtom, Ault, Somanader
- Colours: Green and Yellow
- Song: "Land of a birth We pledge to thee.."
- Sports: Cricket, Football
- Yearbook: Central light

Methodist Central College is a provincial school in Batticaloa, Sri Lanka.

== History ==
Methodist Central College was established in 1814 by Rev. William Ault, one of the Wesleyan Methodist missionaries to Ceylon. The missionaries sailed to Ceylon from Portsmouth, England on 30 December 1813, landing in Ceylon on 29 June 1814. Methodist Central College was the first educational institution in Batticaloa.

In the early years, according to Shirley Somanader, "the Boys’ school was held on the verandah facing College House (presently the Puliyantivu Methodist Minister's Manse)". Somander also wrote, "In 1859, the new school was completed at a cost of 350 British Pounds."

At the bicentennial of the college in 2014, according to the school's alumni association, "In recognising and commemorating this historic event, the Government of Sri Lanka has approved the release of a new stamp this year. Since the inception of this college in 1814, its profound achievements in the arenas of culture, education and religion have kept on flourishing on the island."

== See also ==
- List of schools in Eastern Province, Sri Lanka
