= Madhya Vidyalaya =

The "Madhya Vidyalaya (Central College)" concept (English: Central College) is a type of state school in Sri Lanka. Originally mooted in the 1930s by C.W.W. Kannangara, 54 Central Colleges were founded between 1943 and 1947 as part of his initiative to establish free education in Sri Lanka. The first of these was C. W. W. Kannangara Central College in Matugama, followed by others in areas such as Horana, Henegama, Ibbagamuwa, Weeraketiya, Anuradhapura, Kuliyapitiya, Madampe, Hunumulla, Veyangoda, Ruwanwella, Pinnawala and Dickwella & more

With more central colleges established since the original drive in the 1940s, most such schools are now funded and administered by the local provincial council, while a few, by virtue of their status as National Schools, come under the direct purview of the Ministry of Education.

In 2008, the 54 schools founded by Kannangara changed their names from "Madhya Maha Vidyalaya" to "Madhya Vidyalaya" in a bid to establish a separate identity from other Madhya Maha Vidyalayas established later on.

== See also ==
- Education in Sri Lanka
- Wickramabahu Central College
