= National school (Sri Lanka) =

Nationally-funded school in Sri Lanka

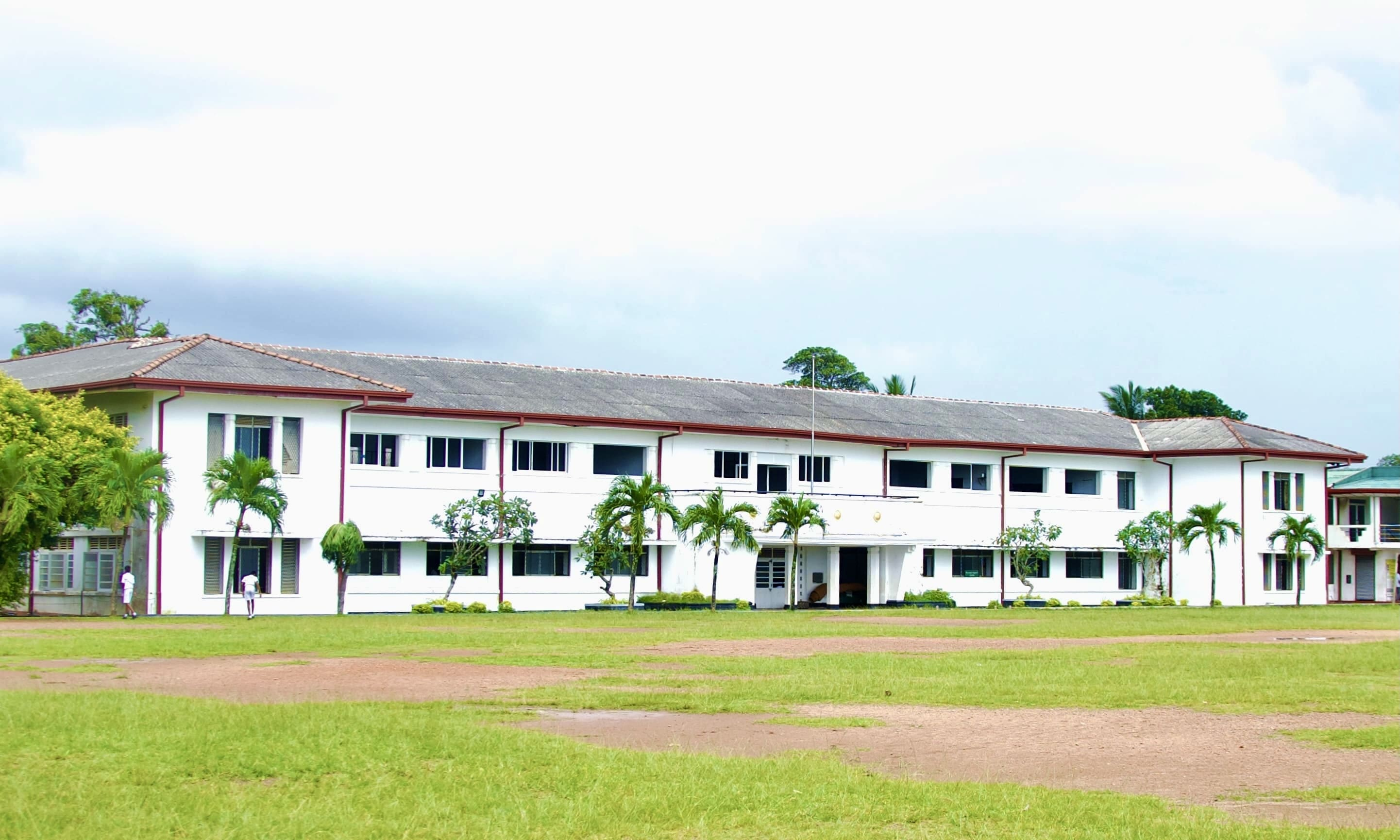
Kalutara Vidyalaya, Kalutara

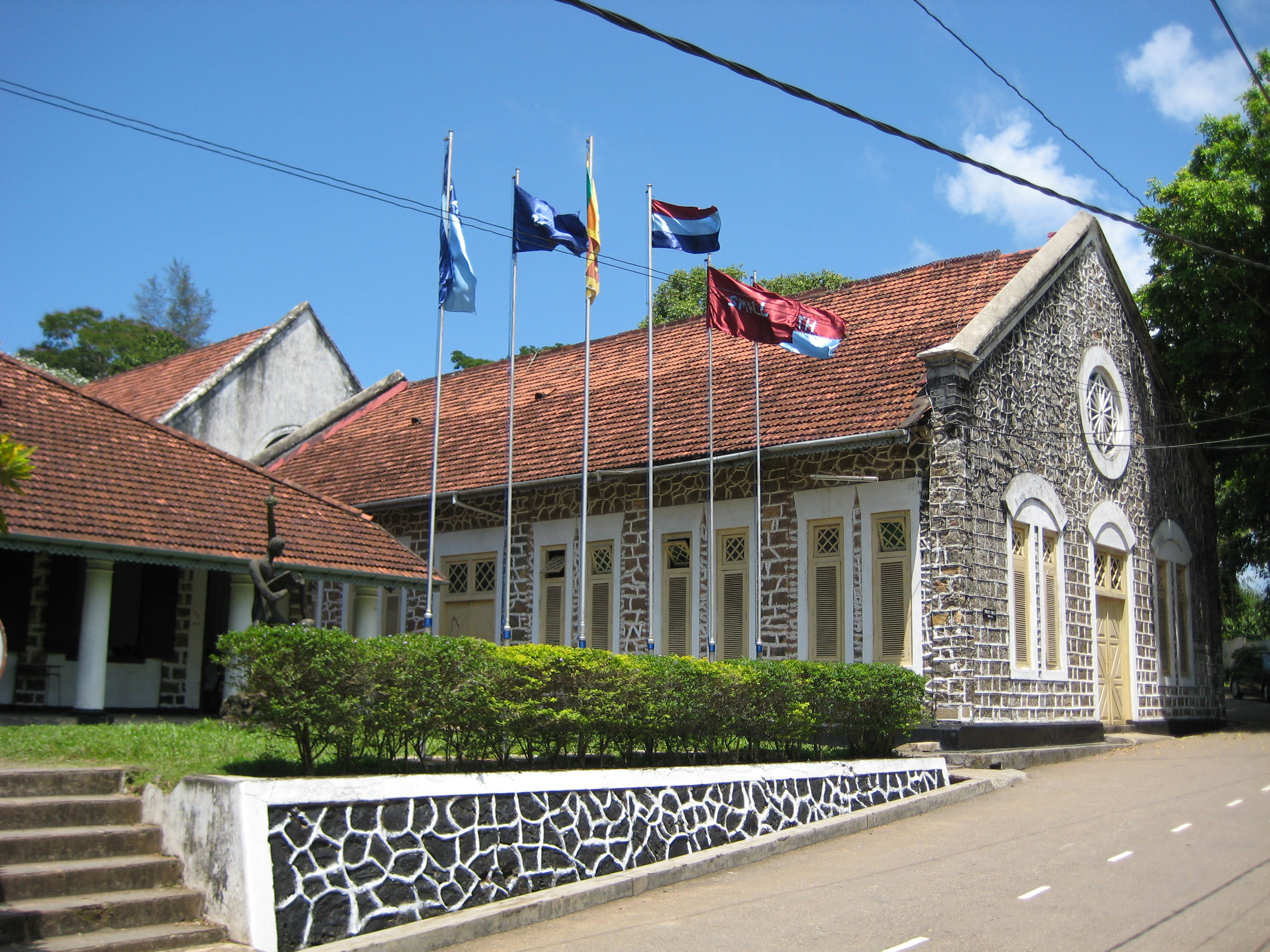
Richmond College, Galle

A National school (Sinhala: ජාතික පාසල, Jathika Pasala, Tamil: தேசியப் பாடசாலை) in Sri Lanka is a school that is funded and administered by the Ministry of Education of the central government as opposed to Provincial schools run by the local provincial council. These schools provide secondary education (some including collegiate), with some providing primary education as well. The classification began in 1985, with 18 schools being designated as national schools. Today, there are 396 National Schools in country constituting 3 percent of total National and Provincial Schools.

== History ==
With the decentralisation of government administration following the establishment of provincial councils from the 13th Amendment to the Constitution in 1987, the central government transferred control of government schools, with the exception of 18 elite schools that had been designated as national schools by the Ministry of Education in 1985. The criteria for listing as a national school were as follows:

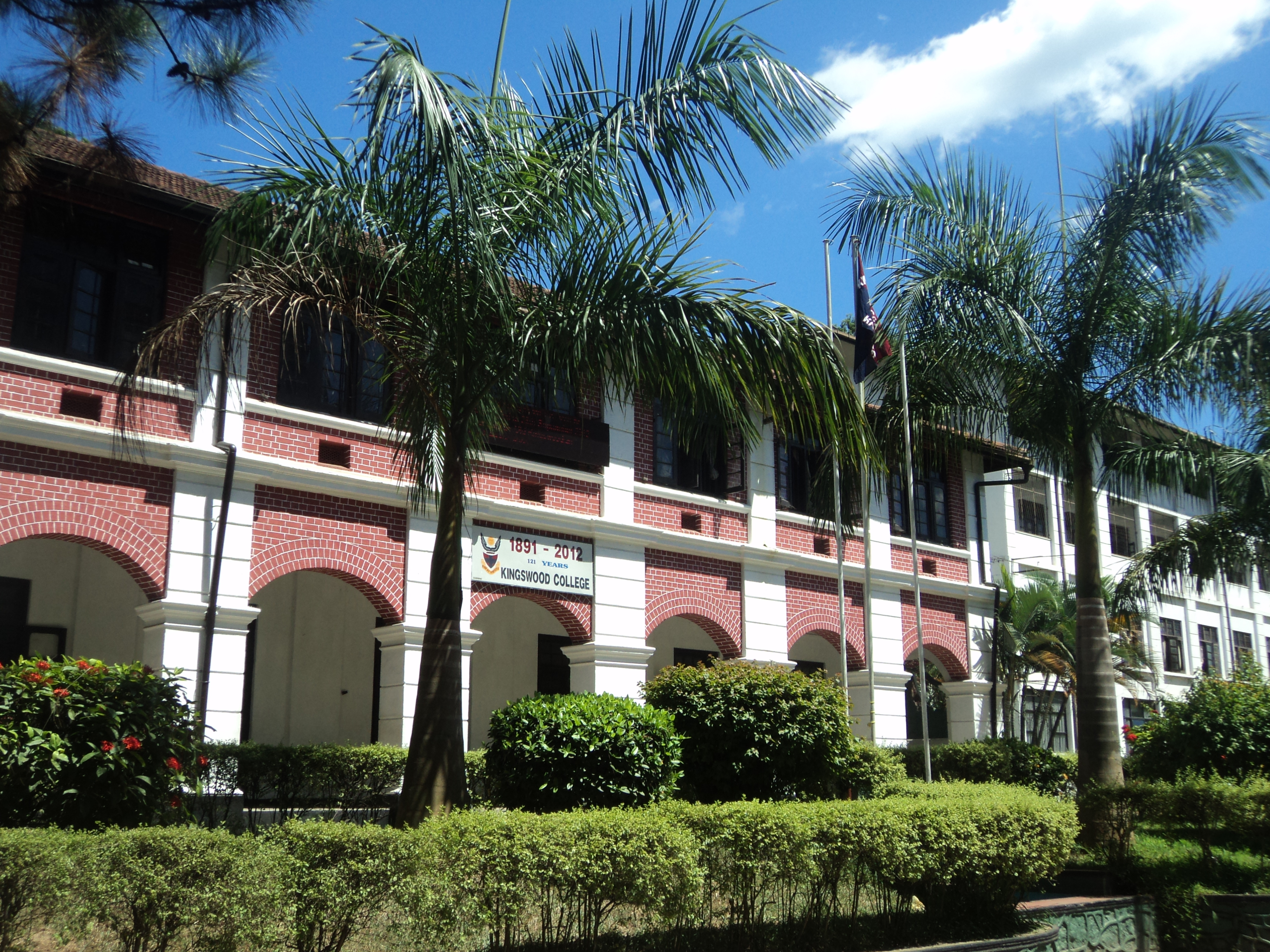
Kingswood College, Kandy

1. The total school enrollment in the school should be 2000 or more.
2. The school should have a well-established collegiate section with a sufficient number of students in the science arts and commerce streams.
3. The GCE A/L results of the school should indicate a reasonable academic standard.
4. The buildings, furniture, equipment, and other facilities should match the student numbers of the school.
5. The school should be in a position to obtain adequate financial support from the school development society, past pupils' association and other sources in the community.
6. The school should be generally accepted by the community as one of the best in the region.

Most of the selected schools were from Colombo along with several other cities. In the following five years only five schools were declared national schools, based on the initial criteria.

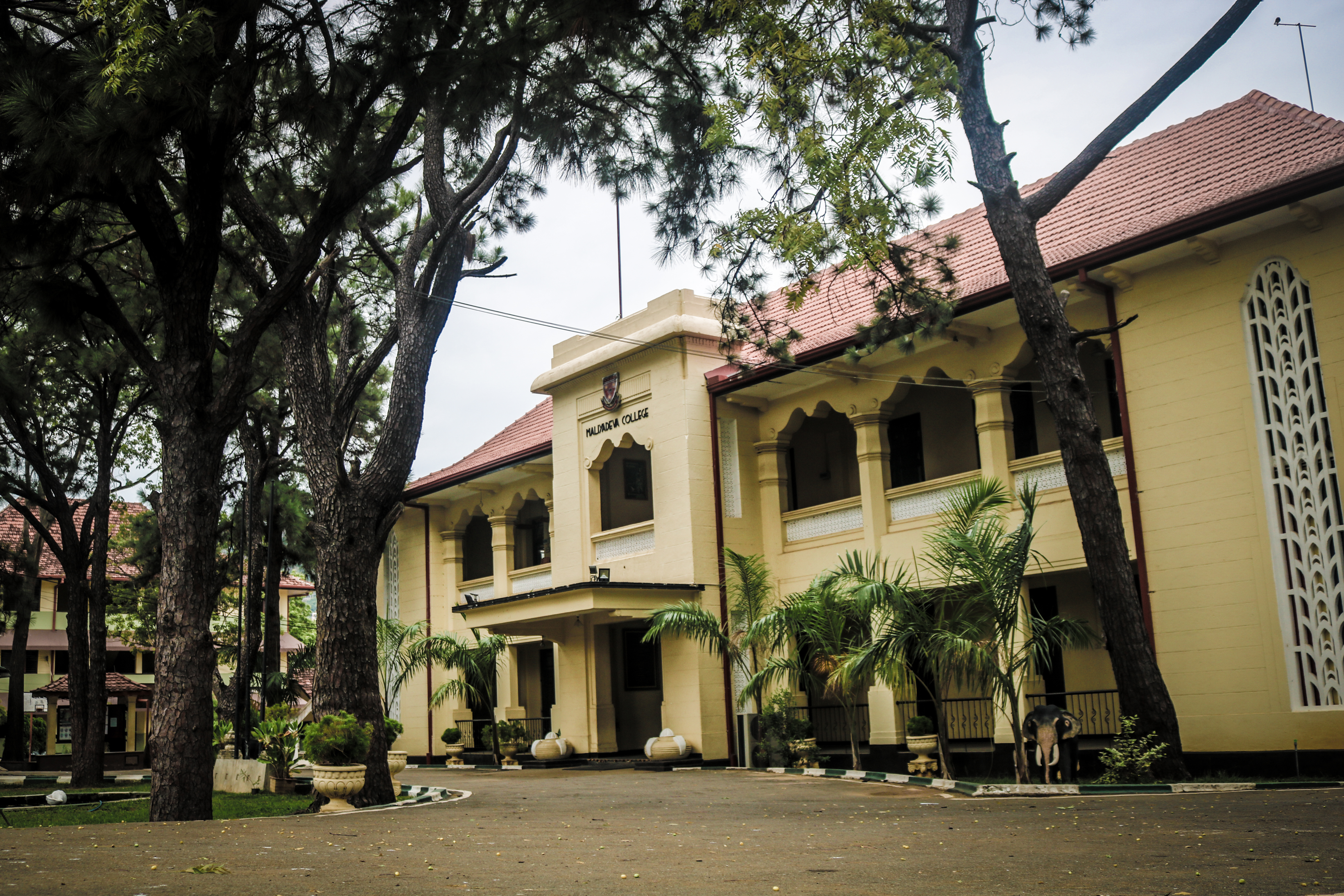
Maliyadeva College, Kurunegala

In 1990 the criteria were revised:

1. The school should have 2000 or more students.
2. The school should have 200 or more students in the GCE A/L science classes.
3. Of the number of students appearing for the GCE A/L examination during the previous three years, one third should have qualified for admission to universities each year.
4. There should be adequate buildings, desks, and chairs for all students.
5. There should be adequate facilities for teaching technology-related subjects.
6. Laboratory facilities should be adequate to meet the requirements of all GCE O/L and A/L students.
7. Annual income from facilities and services' fees should exceed Rs.15,000.
8. Residents should consider the school to be one of the leading schools in the locality.
9. The school should have an effective School Development Society.
10. The school should have an active Past Pupils' Association.

Following this change, there was a gross increase in schools being upgraded to national school grades with a total of 37 national schools in 1992 and 165 in 1994. In most cases upgrade appeared to be a mere name change with no tangible change as by 2000 there were 317 national schools islandwide.

The National Education Commission stated on the situation in 2003: "... the new category of a limited number of National Schools created in the early 1980s using strict criteria to identify schools with very good facilities and offering quality education has become meaningless and distorted with the indiscriminate addition of schools that do not conform to these criteria. Currently, 27 of the 353 National Schools are 1C schools (without Science education at GCE Advanced Level) and one National School is a Type 2 school with classes to GCE Ordinary Level only".

== See also ==
- Lists of schools in Sri Lanka
