= 2014 in Sri Lanka =

- Decades: 1990s; 2000s; 2010s; 2020s
- See also: Other events of 2014; Timeline of Sri Lankan history

Events from the year 2014 in Sri Lanka.

== Incumbents ==
- President – Mahinda Rajapaksa
- Prime Minister – D. M. Jayaratne
- Chief Justice – Mohan Peiris

=== Governors ===
- Central Province – Tikiri Kobbekaduwa
- Eastern Province – Mohan Wijewickrama
- North Central Province – Karunarathna Divulgane
- Northern Province – G. A. Chandrasiri
- North Western Province – Tissa Balalla
- Sabaragamuwa Province – W. J. M. Lokubandara
- Southern Province – Kumari Balasuriya
- Uva Province – Nanda Mathew
- Western Province – Alavi Moulana

=== Chief Ministers ===
- Central Province – Sarath Ekanayake
- Eastern Province – M. N. Abdul Majeed
- North Central Province – S. M. Ranjith
- Northern Province – C. V. Vigneswaran
- North Western Province – Dayasiri Jayasekara
- Sabaragamuwa Province – Maheepala Herath
- Southern Province – Shan Wijayalal De Silva
- Uva Province – Shasheendra Rajapaksa
- Western Province – Prasanna Ranatunga

== Events ==
=== January ===
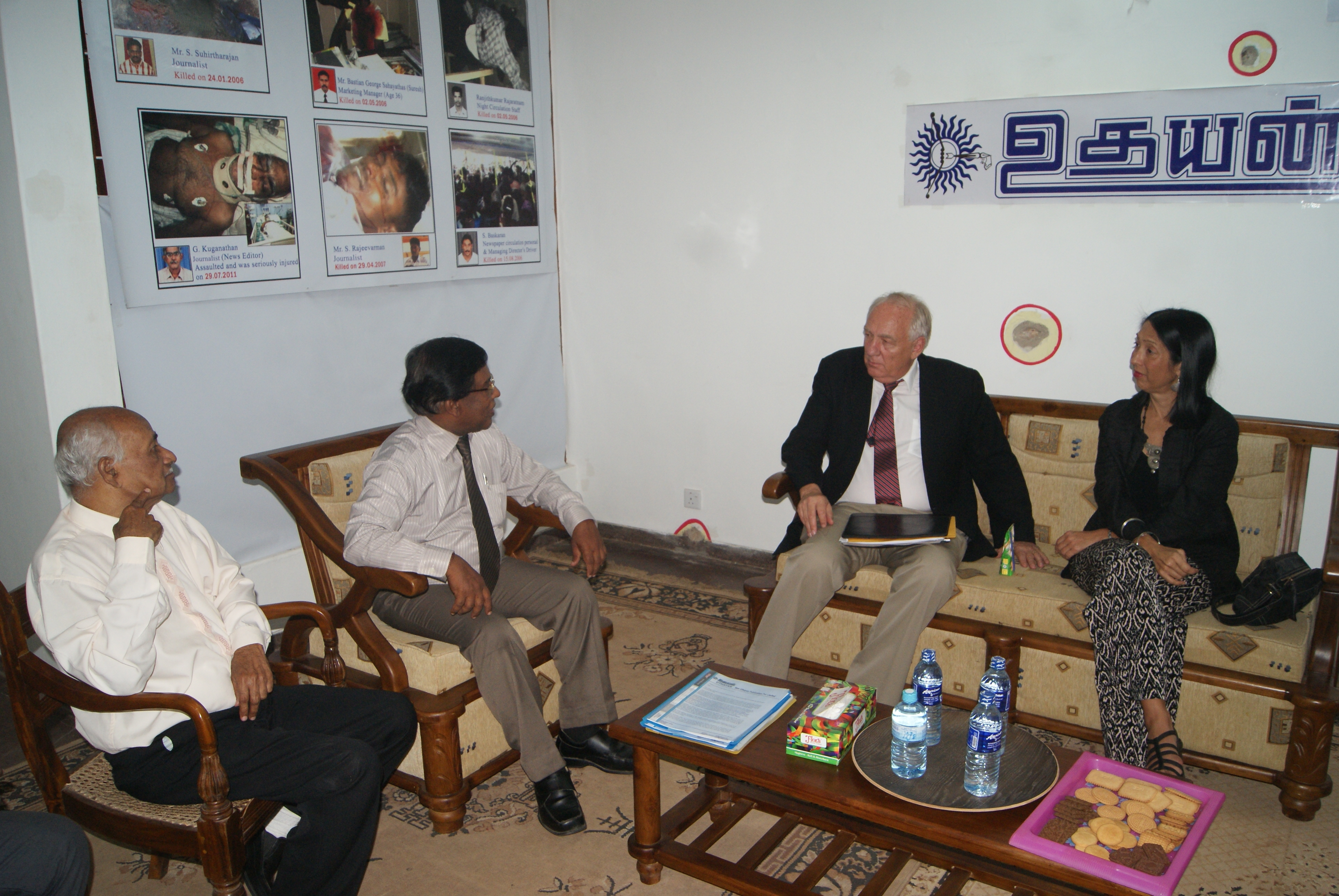
8 January: United States Ambassador-at-Large for War Crimes Issues Stephen Rapp at the Uthayan offices in Jaffna

- 1 January – A SriLankan Airlines flight to London Heathrow Airport is forced to return to Bandaranaike International Airport after a crack appears on the wind screen.
- 5 January – Tropical Cyclone One (01B) makes landfall over northern Sri Lanka, causing thousands to be evacuated from coastal areas.
- 6 January – United States Ambassador-at-Large for War Crimes Issues Stephen Rapp arrives in Sri Lanka for a six-day visit to discuss allegations of war crimes.
- 9 January – Tangalle murder and gang rape: The Colombo High Court issues an arrest warrant for United People's Freedom Alliance chairman of Tangalle Pradeshiya Sabha Sampath Chandra Pushpa Vidanapathirana after he fails to attend a bail hearing.
- 11 January – A flydubai flight to Dubai International Airport is forced to make an emergency landing at Mattala Rajapaksa International Airport after it strikes a peacock during take-off.
- 12 January
  - A number of churches, including two in Hikkaduwa and one in Homagama, are attacked by mobs including Buddhist monks.
  - Provincial council election: Southern Provincial Council and Western Provincial Council are dissolved by their governors.
- 16 January
  - 51 Indian fishermen are released by the Sri Lankan authorities but 236 remain in Sri Lankan custody and one remains in hospital.
  - Severe flooding affects Batticaloa District and Polonnaruwa District.
- 17 January
  - One person is killed and more than 60 injured after a head-on collision between two buses in Pasyala near Nittambuwa.
  - Police disrupt a Democratic Party rally in Balapitiya at which former presidential candidate Sarath Fonseka was speaking.
- 21 January
  - Tangalle murder and gang rape: United People's Freedom Alliance chairman of Tangalle Pradeshiya Sabha Sampath Chandra Pushpa Vidanapathirana is re-arrested after being found hiding in a house near Ananda Sastralaya, Kotte.
  - The Ontario Superior Court of Justice orders terrorism "expert" Rohan Gunaratna to pay the Canadian Tamil Congress damages of $37,000 and costs of $16,000 after Gunaratna falsely claimed that the CTC was a front for the Liberation Tigers of Tamil Eelam.
- 22 January – The Permanent Peoples' Tribunal on Sri Lanka in Bremen rules that the Sri Lankan state is guilty of genocide against Eelam Tamils, saying that the Sri Lankan military conducted "a oordinated plan whose different components aim at the physical destruction’ of the Tamil people ‘in whole or in part.’"
- 23 January
  - A 20-year-old Australian student is raped at Gendawana Rock near Ambalangoda.
  - Four million illegally imported cigarettes worth Rs. 112 million is seized in Orugodawatte by customs officials.
- 31 January
  - United States Assistant Secretary of State for South and Central Asian Affairs Nisha Desai Biswal arrives in Sri Lanka for a three-day visit to discuss reconciliation, justice and accountability issues ahead of the United Nations Human Rights Council session in March at which another resolution is expected on Sri Lanka.
  - United States Ambassador-at-Large for Global Women's Issues Catherine M. Russell is allegedly denied a visa to visit Sri Lanka.

=== February ===
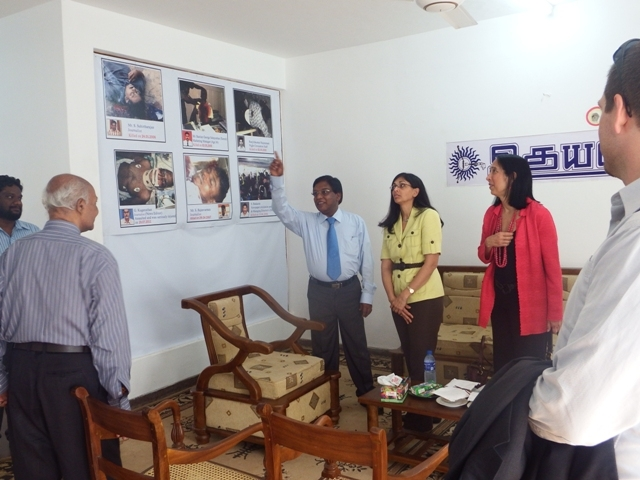
1 February: United States Assistant Secretary of State for South and Central Asian Affairs Nisha Desai Biswal at the Uthayan offices in Jaffna

- 1 February – Student Sandaruwan Jayaratne dies at Kandy Hospital after falling ill during compulsory leadership training by the Sri Lanka Army at the Gannoruwa Army Camp.
- 2 February
  - Journalist Mel Gunasekera is stabbed to death at her home in Battaramulla.
  - Anura Kumara Dissanayake is elected as the new leader of the Janatha Vimukthi Peramuna.
- 4 February – The Australian Public Interest Advocacy Centre publishes the Island of impunity? Investigation into international crimes in the final stages of the Sri Lankan civil war report which claims that not only were the Sri Lankan military responsible for most of the alleged war crimes during the final months of the civil war but also that they systematically destroyed evidence war crimes.
- 5 February – 29 people are injured after a bus veered off the road and toppled over at Dimbulapathana, Hatton.
- 9 February – Provincial council election: United People's Freedom Alliance candidate for the Southern Provincial Council and former provincial councillor Ajith Prasanna is arrested for illegal election campaign and assaulting a police officer.
- 10 February – The body of missing University of Peradeniya student Dikovita Kankanamlage Nishantha is found in bushes near student accommodation.
- 11 February – Five people are killed after a van collides with a stationary tipper truck on the A9 between Mankulam and Kilinochchi.
- 12 February – Sri Lanka drops two places to 165 out of 180 in the 2014 World Press Freedom Index.
- 18 February – Assassination of Rajiv Gandhi: The Supreme Court of India commutes the death sentence of three men (V. Sriharan alias Murugan, A. G. Perarivlan alias Arivu and T. Suthendraraja alias Santhan) to life in prison.
- 21 February – Impeachment of Shirani Bandaranayake: The Supreme Court over turns the Court of Appeal decision in January 2013 to quash the Parliamentary Select Committee's findings, saying that the Court of Appeal had no jurisdiction over Parliament.
- 24 February
  - In response to resolution 22/1 passed by the United Nations Human Rights Council on 21 March 2013, the Office of the United Nations High Commissioner for Human Rights of publishes a report on reconciliation and accountability in Sri Lanka which recommends that the UNHRC establishes "an international inquiry mechanism to further investigate the alleged violations of international human rights and humanitarian law".
  - British citizen Visvalingam Gobithas, who was convicted in 2012 of supporting the Liberation Tigers of Tamil Eelam after being detained since 2007 without charge, dies in Welikada Prison in what his family describe as suspicious circumstances.
- 27 February
  - A mass grave with at least nine skeletal remains is found in a garden in Puthukkudiyiruppu, Mullaitivu District.
  - 33 University of Peradeniya students are suspended indefinitely for ragging.

=== March ===
- 4 March – Rail services resume on the Northern Line between Kilinochchi and Pallai after an interruption of 23 years due to the civil war.
- 7 March – Customs officials in Colombo seize 36 kilograms (79 lb) of heroin, worth about Rs.360 million, at the Rank Container Terminal in Orugodawatte.
- 8 March
  - The first phase of the Colombo Outer Circular Expressway, between Kottawa and Kaduwela, is officially opened by President Mahinda Rajapaksa.
  - S. Sathiyasudhan and his young son S. Dinoyan from Sundurampuram are killed after being hit by an express train travelling from Pallai to Colombo as they crossed at a level crossing near Puliyankulam.
- 9 March –
  - UK broadcaster Channel 4 airs more video which it claims shows Sinhala-speaking soldiers belonging to special forces "laughing and cheering, as they celebrate the deaths of the Tiger fighters and perform acts of grotesque sexual violation on the bodies".
  - Four people are killed and two injured in Kataragama after a man stabs several members of his family before setting the house on fire.
- 13 March – Human rights defender Jeyakumari Balendran and her 13-year-old daughter Vithushaini, who had protested about their missing 15-year-old son/brother during United Nations High Commissioner for Human Rights Navi Pillay's and British Prime Minister David Cameron's visits to northern Sri Lanka in 2013, are arrested in Kilinochchi under the draconian Prevention of Terrorism Act for "harbouring a criminal".
- 14 March
  - Two police officers attempt to rape a 27-year-old German tourist at Ella, Badulla District.
  - Kilinochchi magistrates order human rights defender Jeyakumari Balendran to be detained for 16 days under anti-terrorism law and her daughter Vithushaini is placed in care.
- 15 March
  - The second phase of the Southern Expressway, between Pinnaduwa (Galle) to Godagama (Matara), is officially opened by President Mahinda Rajapaksa.
  - Dulsan Amalan, a former pupil of St. Patrick's College, Jaffna, is killed during clashes between rival supporters during the annual big match between St. Patrick's College and Jaffna College at the Jaffna College's ground in Vaddukoddai.
- 16 March
  - Human rights defenders Ruki Fernando and Father Praveen Mahesan are arrested in Kilinochchi under the draconian Prevention of Terrorism Act on suspicion of "inciting racial or religious hatred or disharmony, or violence between ethnic groups".
  - Residents of Hanwella protest against contamination of ground water by the Hanwella Rubber Products factory, resulting in violent clashes with the police which lead to the death of Chief Inspector Prasad Siriwardhana, the Officer In Charge of Borella.
- 17 March – Indian broadcaster NewsX airs video which allegedly shows a Sri Lankan soldier claiming that the Sri Lankan military used chemical weapons on civilians.
- 18 March
  - Human rights defenders Ruki Fernando and Father Praveen Mahesan are released by the Terrorist Investigation Division following widespread international condemnation.
  - Provincial council election: United National Party supporter O. K. Piyasena is killed in Dompe after being assaulted by United People's Freedom Alliance supporter Pathberiya Arachchige Wasantha (alias Sunil).
  - Provincial council election: United People's Freedom Alliance candidate for the Southern Provincial Council and former provincial minister D. V. Rohana Priya Upul is arrested for assaulting supporters of another UPFA candidate in Medagoda.
  - Four people are killed in a head-on collision between an auto rickshaw and bus on the Narammala–Negombo Road at Matiyagane.
- 19 March – Police fire tear gas and water cannons at around 5,000 University of Kelaniya students belonging to the Inter University Students' Federation who were protesting in the Colombo Fort area.
- 20 March – The Sri Lankan government bans 15 Sri Lankan Tamil diaspora groups, including the BTF, CTC, GTF TGTE and TYO, and 424 individuals as terrorists.
- 21 March – A 23-year-old German student is raped at her home in Bambalapitiya.
- 23 March – A 22-year-old Swedish tourist is raped at a hotel in Pelana, Weligama by the former United People's Freedom Alliance chairman of Weligama Pradeshiya Sabha Dikkumburage Kulaweera.
- 26 March – Tangalle murder and gang rape: The trial of United People's Freedom Alliance chairman of Tangalle Pradeshiya Sabha Sampath Chandra Pushpa Vidanapathirana and eight others begins at Colombo High Court.

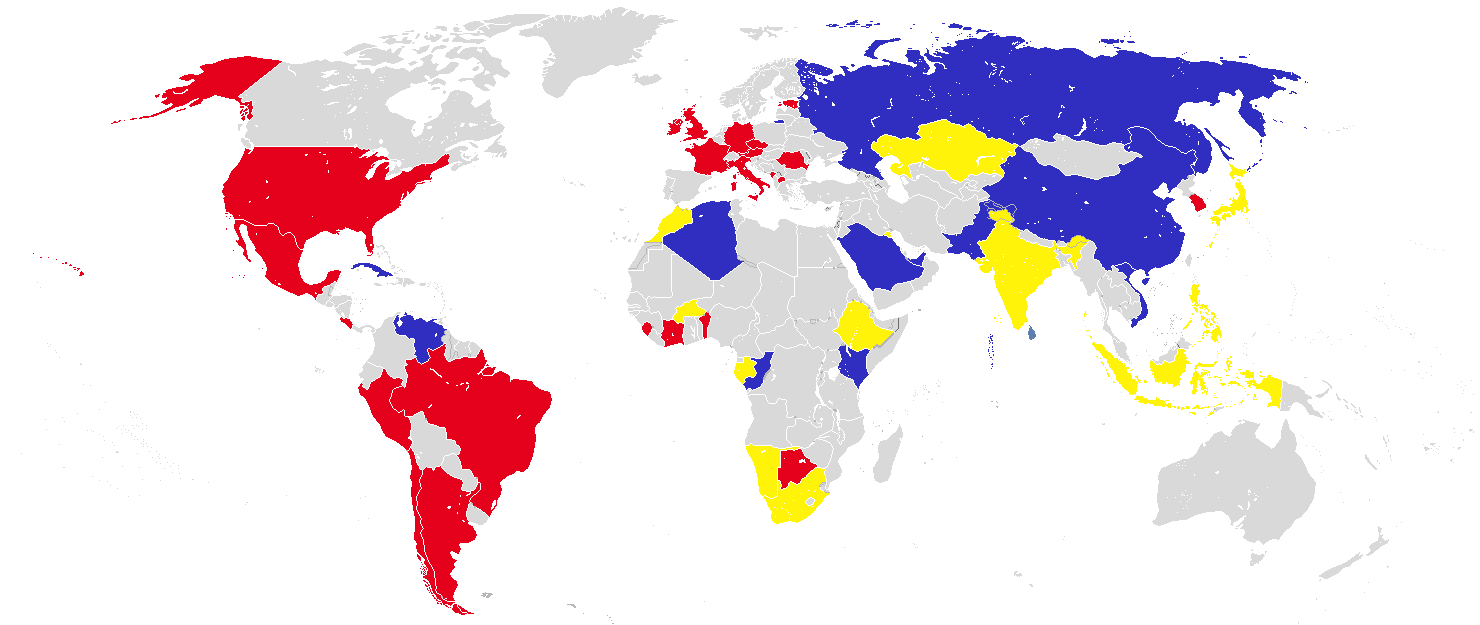
27 March: United Nations Human Rights Council passes resolution 25/1 on Sri Lanka

- 27 March
  - The United Nations Human Rights Council votes by 23 to 12 to pass resolution 25/1 authorising an international investigation into alleged war crimes during the 2002-09 period, despite opposition from the Sri Lankan government.
  - The Kandy High Court sentences ten people to death for the murder of an autorickshaw driver in Nagala, Rattota on 8 April 2004.
- 28 March
  - President Rajapaksa orders the release of all Indian fisherman detained for fishing illegally in Sri Lankan waters, as gratitude for India abstaining during the UNHRC vote.
  - Three people are killed and nine injured following a head-on collision between a bus and a tipper truck on the Colombo–Kandy road in Tholangamuwa near Warakapola.
  - A group of twenty Buddhist monks disrupt and break up a US-funded seminar for journalists in Polonnaruwa.
- 29 March – Provincial council election: The United People's Freedom Alliance retains control of Southern Provincial Council and Western Provincial Council.

=== April ===
- 2 April – 14 people including Galagoda Aththe Gnanasara, the leader of the Bodu Bala Sena, charged with attacking the Cavalry Church in Thalahena, Malabe in 2008 are acquitted by Colombo High Court.
- 3 April – Tangalle murder and gang rape: Four suspects are released on bail.
- 4 April – Provincial council election: Incumbents Shan Wijayalal De Silva and Prasanna Ranatunga take oath, as Chief Minister of Southern and Western provinces respectively, in front of President Rajapaksa at the Presidential Secretariat.
- 6 April – Sri Lanka win the 2014 ICC World Twenty20, their first major tournament victory since 1996.
- 7 April – The Government of Sri Lanka takes over the Trincomalee Hospital from the Eastern Provincial Council.
- 8 April – Mannar mass grave: The Archeological Department claims that the site is an ordinary cemetery dating back to the 1930s.
- 11 April – The Sri Lankan military shoots dead three alleged members of the rebel Liberation Tigers of Tamil Eelam - Selvanayagam Kajeepan alias Gobi, Sundaralingam Kajeepan alias Thevihan and Navaratnam Navaneethan alias Appan - in Vedivachchikallu near Nedunkerny, Vavuniya District.
- 13 April – Three people are killed and 18 injured when two buses collide near Ashraff Memorial Hospital in Kalmunai.
- 14 April
  - Canada suspends voluntary funding of C$20m to the Commonwealth whilst the chair is held by Sri Lanka for two years.
  - Freelance journalist Sivagnanam Selvatheepan is attacked by men wearing helmets near Puraporukki in Vadamarachchi.
- 17 April – Five United National Party MPs visiting Hambantota are attacked by government supporters including the pistol brandishing United People's Freedom Alliance mayor of Hambantota Eraj Ravindra Fernando as the police look on.
- 18 April – Ten people are killed when the tractor they were travelling on topples into the ZD canal in Aluthoya, Aralaganwila, Polonnaruwa District.
- 19 April – Five people are killed when the van they were travelling in skidded off the road and fell into Detagamuwa tank in Kataragama.
- 21 April – British tourist Naomi Coleman is arrested at Bandaranaike International Airport and threatened with deportation because she had hurt "others' religious feelings" by having a tattoo of Buddha on her arm.
- 22 April – Sri Lankan coach Paul Farbrace resigns to take up a role at the England and Wales Cricket Board.
- 24 April – Parliament passes the controversial Strategic Development Project Act Gazette No. 01 (extraordinary gazette no. 1847/35) which gives approval for Dhammika Perera's $300 million 500 room Queensbury Resort (The Queensbury Leisure Limited) at D. R. Wijewardena Mawatha, Colombo, an "Integrated Super Luxury Tourist Resort" with "associated facilities"" which opponents claim includes casinos.
- 25 April – Parliament passes the controversial Strategic Development Project Act Gazette No. 02 (extraordinary gazette no. 1847/36) and Strategic Development Project Act Gazette No. 03 (extraordinary gazette no. 1847/37) which give approval for John Keells Holdings' $650 million Water Front Resort (Waterfront Properties (Private) Limited) at Glennie Street/Justice Akbar Mawatha, Colombo and Kerry Packer's $350 million 400 room Crown Resort (Lake Leisure Holdings (Private) Limited) at D. R. Wijewardena Mawatha, Colombo respectively, two "Integrated Super Luxury Tourist Resorts" with "associated facilities"" which opponents claim includes casinos.
- 28 April – Seven people are sentenced to death by the Nuwara Eliya High Court for the 1994 murder of R. M. Sumanadasa in Nildandahinna.
- 30 April – A head-on collision between two trains on the Northern Line at Pothuhera injures 68 people.

=== May ===
- 4 May – Three members of the same family are hacked to death and two others injured in Achchuveli.
- 6 May
  - The Sri Lankan military orders the University of Jaffna to close between 16 May and 20 May to prevent students from commemorating Mullivaikkal Day, the annual remembrance day for people killed in the final stages of the civil war.
  - Police officer Chandana Sampath is shot dead and his colleague Ajith Weerasuriya is injured after being abducted near Kurunegala.
- 7 May – Three new Supreme Court judges - Sisira J. De Abrew, Sarath De Abrew and controversially Priyantha Jayawardena - are sworn in before President Rajapaksa at Temple Trees.
- 8 May
  - Government spokesman Keheliya Rambukwella says the government won't oppose a casino in James Packer's Crown Resort, contrary to what the government and President Rajapaksa had said previously.
  - Colombo High Court sentences former Deputy Commissioner of Inland Revenue Gnanasiri de Soyza Jayathilake to 102 years rigorous imprisonment to be spent in three years and fines him Rs.12 billion for committing Rs. 4 billion VAT fraud.
- 9 May
  - A Muslim owned supermarket in Aluthgama is attacked and burnt down by a mob led by Buddhist monks.
  - 18-year-old Sandun Malinga, who had been arrested on 7 May for treasure hunting in Bogahalanda forest reserve, dies after being assaulted by police officers from Kandeketiya Police Station.
- 12 May – Peliyagoda Urban Council member Chamila Sandaruwan is shot dead in Kelaniya.
- 16 May
  - The police prevent Tamil National Alliance members of the Northern Provincial Council from holding a remembrance event in Kaithady for Tamils killed during the civil war, destroying floral tributes and memorial lamps.
  - Several Inter University Students' Federation members are arrested during protests outside the University Grants Commission in Colombo, some of whom are assaulted by the police and hospitalised.
- 18 May
  - The Sri Lankan military blocks religious sites, newspaper offices and political party headquarters on the Jaffna Peninsula to prevent locals from commemorating their war dead.
  - The main suspect in the shooting of a police officer in Kurunegala on 6 May is shot dead by the police whilst in their custody.
- 22 May – A Transparency International workshop at the Deer Park Hotel, Giritale, Polonnaruwa District for Tamil speaking journalists is abandoned following threats and intimidation from the Sri Lankan military.
- 26 May – Three Tamil refugees arrested by Malaysian police on 15 May for allegedly being members of the Liberation Tigers of Tamil Eelam, raising concern in the United Nations and human rights groups, arrive in Sri Lanka.
- 30 May – Police officer Suminda Saman, who had issued a fine on Deputy Minister Hemal Gunasekara on 20 May for speeding on the Southern Expressway, is attacked in Dodamgoda near Kalutara by a group of goons associated with Gunasekara.

=== June ===
- 2 June – Students at the University of Ruhuna campus in Matara are attacked by a mob of government supporters led allegedly by Deputy Minister and former international cricketer Sanath Jayasuriya.
- 3 June – At least 22 people are killed and over 27,000 displaced due to floods and landslides in south western Sri Lanka over the last few days.
- 4 June – Bus conductor Prabhath Chandana is shot dead in Tangalle by two unidentified men on a motor cycle.
- 7 June – A Transparency International workshop at the Goldie Sands Hotel, Negombo for Tamil speaking journalists is abandoned following threats and intimidation by a group of "protesters".
- 8 June – Journalists from the abandoned Transparency International in Negombo are forced to leave the Galadari Hotel, Colombo following threatening calls.
- 11 June
  - Special Task Force personnel seize 85 kilograms (187 lb) of heroin, worth about Rs.680 million, in Kelaniya.
  - A drunk police officer shoots dead motorcyclist Subash Indika at Pasyala, Gampaha District.
- 12 June – A Sinhalese mob attack Muslim shops in Aluthgama following an alleged attack on a Buddhist monk.
- 16 June – Anti-Muslim riots: At least three people are killed and 80 injured in riots in Kalutara District. A fourth person is killed in Welipenna.
- 19 June
  - Moderate Buddhist monk Watareka Vijitha, who had threatened by the Bodu Bala Sena, is abducted and assaulted in the Bandaragama area.
  - Anti-Muslim riots: Muslim businesses across the country stage a hartal on as protest against the riots.
- 20 June – The Kamaal Mosque in Navanthurai, Jaffna District is attacked by unidentified persons.
- 21 June – The Muslim owned No-Limit clothing store in Panadura is destroyed by fire in the early hours, causing Rs.400 million in damage.

=== October ===
- 24 October – The Sri Lankan parliament pass a law banning land purchases by foreigners. The new act will allow foreigners to acquire land only on a lease basis of up to 99 years with an annual 15 percent tax on the total rental paid upfront.
- 29 October – a 3 km long landslide in Badulla kills at least 16 and leaves 200 missing.

== Deaths ==
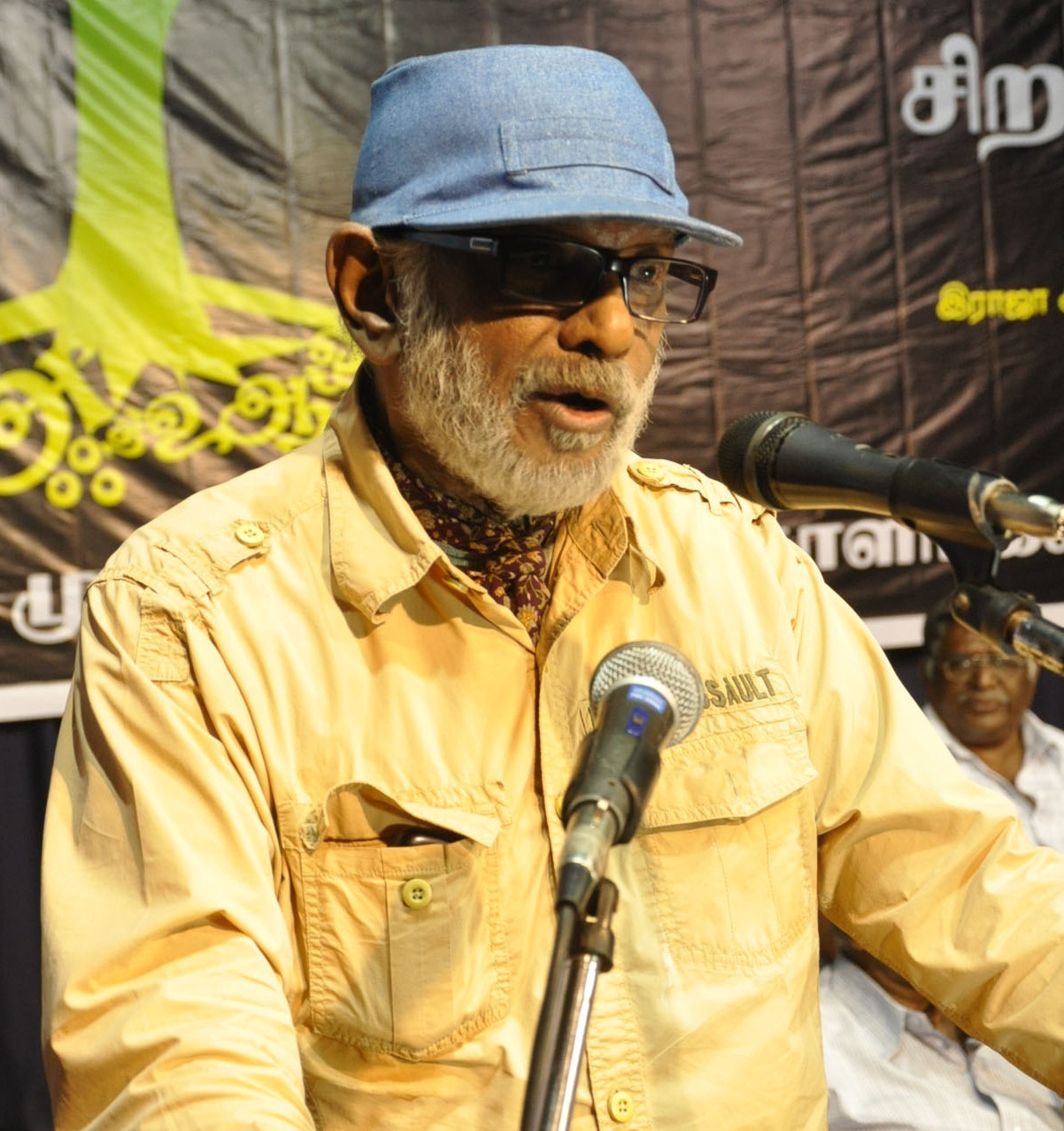
Balu Mahendra, 1939-2014

- 14 January – A. V. Suraweera, academic and author (born 1930).
- 19 January – Stanley Jeyaraja Tambiah, academic (born 1929).
- 23 January – S. Sriskandarajah, judge.
- 8 February – Premji Gnanasundaram, writer (born 1930).
- 13 February – Balu Mahendra, film director (born 1939).
- 26 February – K. S. Balachandran, actor, writer (born 1944).
- 16 March – Sanjeewa Kavirathna, politician (born 1969).
- 17 March
  - Mercy Edirisinghe, actress and singer (born 1948).
  - M. A. Gafoor, film director.
- 22 March
  - J. W. Subasinghe, lawyer and civil servant.
  - Sithie Tiruchelvam, lawyer and activist.
- 3 June – S. D. Bandaranayake, politician.

== See also ==
- Years in Sri Lanka
