= 2012 in Sri Lanka =

- Decades: 1990s; 2000s; 2010s; 2020s
- See also: Other events of 2012; Timeline of Sri Lankan history

Events from the year 2012 in Sri Lanka.

== Incumbents ==
- President – Mahinda Rajapaksa
- Prime Minister – D. M. Jayaratne
- Chief Justice – Shirani Bandaranayake

=== Governors ===
- Central Province – Tikiri Kobbekaduwa
- Eastern Province – Mohan Wijewickrama
- North Central Province – Karunarathna Divulgane
- Northern Province – G. A. Chandrasiri
- North Western Province – Tissa Balalla
- Sabaragamuwa Province – W. J. M. Lokubandara
- Southern Province – Kumari Balasuriya
- Uva Province – Nanda Mathew
- Western Province – Alavi Moulana

=== Chief Ministers ===
- Central Province – Sarath Ekanayake
- Eastern Province – Sivanesathurai Chandrakanthan (until 18 September); M. N. Abdul Majeed (starting 18 September)
- North Central Province – Berty Premalal Dissanayake (until 24 September); S. M. Ranjith (starting 24 September)
- North Western Province – Athula Wijesinghe
- Sabaragamuwa Province – Maheepala Herath
- Southern Province – Shan Wijayalal De Silva
- Uva Province – Shasheendra Rajapaksa
- Western Province – Prasanna Ranatunga

== Events ==
=== January to March ===
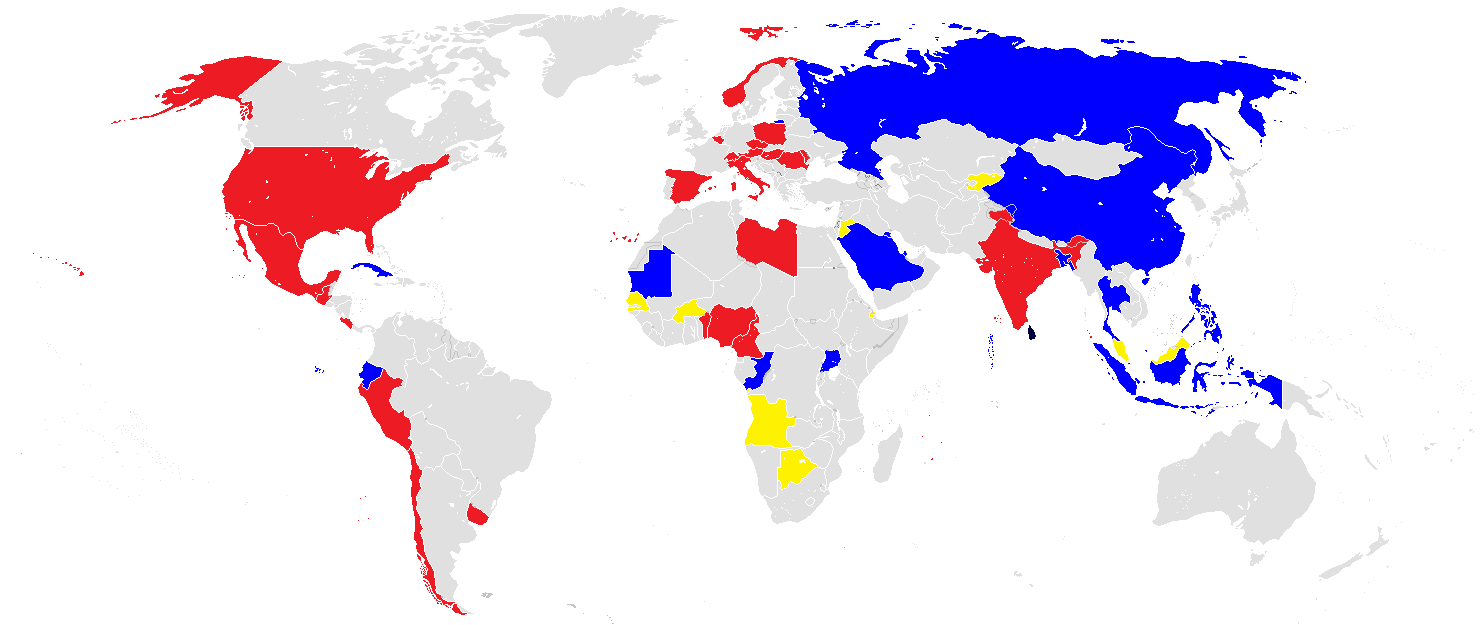
22 March: United Nations Human Rights Council passes resolution 19/2 on Sri Lanka

- 6 January – Tangalle murder and gang rape: Five men, including Sampath Chandra Pushpa Vidanapathirana, the United People's Freedom Alliance chairman of Tangalle Pradeshiya Sabha, are remanded until 20 January.
- 20 January – Tangalle murder and gang rape: Five suspects, including Sampath Chandra Pushpa Vidanapathirana, the United People's Freedom Alliance chairman of Tangalle Pradeshiya Sabha, are remanded until 3 February.
- 24 January – 31 are injured during riots at the Magazine Prison (near Welikada Prison), Colombo.
- 31 January – Kahawatte murders: P. Nayana Nilmini and her daughter Kavindhya Chathurangi Sellahewa killed in their home in Kahawatta.
- 21 February – Tangalle High Court sentences Buddhist monk Gomadiye Sarana and Makumburage Wijesiri to death for stabbing Makumburage Dharmadasa on 10 January 2000.
- 24 February – A government report claims that 7,934 people (excluding security forces) were killed in the Northern Province during the final phase (January to May 2009) of the civil war, a departure from the government's previous claim of "zero civilian casualties".
- 14 March – Sri Lanka's Killing Fields: War Crimes Unpunished broadcast on Channel 4 in the UK.
- 16 March – Thieves steal ancient coins, rings, swords and other historic artefacts from the National Museum of Colombo.
- 20 March – Monks Pitigala Jinasiri and Borelasgamuwe Gunarathana stabbed to death at Kotte Raja Maha Viharaya.
- 22 March – The United Nations Human Rights Council votes by 24 to 14 to pass resolution 19/2 on Sri Lanka despite opposition from the Sri Lankan government.
- 23 March – Government minister Mervyn Silva threatens to "break the limbs" of some journalists and human rights workers whom he labelled "traitors".

=== April to June ===
- 6 April
  - Australian Premakumar Gunaratnam is abducted from his home in Kiribathgoda, just days before he was due to launch the Frontline Socialist Party, a breakaway faction of the Janatha Vimukthi Peramuna.
  - Dimuthu Attygalle is abducted from a suburb of Colombo.
- 9 April – Premakumar Gunaratnam walks into the Colombo Crimes Division, Dematagoda, claiming he had been kidnapped.
- 10 April
  - Dimuthu Attygalle appears at a Front Line Socialist Party press conference in Madiwela, claiming she had been abducted and interrogated by the police.
  - Premakumar Gunaratnam is deported to Australia.
- 18 April – Easwarathasan Ketheeswaran, a refugee who had been sent back to Sri Lank from the UK, is killed at Iyankerni, Trincomalee.
- 20 April – Around 2,000 Buddhist protesters, including monks, try to storm a mosque in Dambulla.
- 22 April – Government orders the removal of the mosque in Dambulla.
- 26 April – Muslims in eastern Sri Lanka strike over threats to a mosque in Dambulla.
- 3 May
  - Canadian Anthonypillai Mahendrarajah (Andrew Mahendrarajah Antonipillai) is hacked to death in Kaagnchipuram Lane, Paranthan.
  - Diamonds, gold rings and other jewellery worth millions of dollars stolen in Greece by Janaka Weerasinghe (alias Upul Ranga Perera) and shipped to Colombo is seized by Sri Lanka Customs.
- 21 May – Former presidential candidate Sarath Fonseka is released from prison after receiving a conditional pardon from his opponent President Mahinda Rajapaksa but is barred from contesting or voting at elections for seven years.
- 30 May – Kahawatte murders: Sisters Hethuge Dayawathi and Hethuge Thilakwathi burnt to death in their house in Warapitiya, Kahawatta.
- 6 June – Stuart Cosgrove, a senior executive at Channel 4, and his wife Shirani Sabaratnam are refused entry into Sri Lanka because Channel 4 "harmed Sri Lanka's reputation".
- 7 June – Lalani Pushpa Kumari and her daughter Senara Nilmini are stabbed to death at their house in Weerahela, Tissamaharama.
- 27 June – Provincial council election: Eastern Provincial Council, North Central Provincial Council and Sabaragamuwa Provincial Council dissolved by their governors.
- 28 June – Vavuniya prison riot: Prisoners, protesting against the transfer of fellow inmate Saravanabhavan to Anuradhapura prison, take three prison guards hostage.
- 29 June
  - Vavuniya prison riot: Special Task Force storm the prison and release the three hostages but 30 prisoners are injured.
  - Police raid the offices of the Sri Lanka Mirror and Sri Lanka X News websites in Colombo for publishing anti-government material, arresting nine people and confiscating equipment.

=== July to September ===
- 4 July – Vavuniya prison riot: Ganesan Nimalaruban (Nimalarooban), one of 28 prisoners who had been transferred to Mahara prison, dies at Colombo North Teaching Hospital.
- 6 July – Frederica Jansz, editor of The Sunday Leader newspaper, is threatened and insulted by Defence Secretary Gotabhaya Rajapaksa, brother of President Mahinda Rajapaksa.
- 9 July – Public health inspector Mohammed Faleel is clubbed to death as he inspects houses for dengue in the Thampalakamam area.
- 18 July – Kahawatte murders: U.G. Premawathie and her daughter H. D. Pushpakumari and murdered and burnt in their house in Kahawatte.
- 20 July – Lawyers boycott courts over threats by Government minister Risad Badhiutheen to kill Mannar magistrate Anthonypillai Judeson.
- 5 August – 37 Chinese fishermen are arrested by the Sri Lanka Navy off eastern Sri Lanka for fishing illegally.
- 7 August – The 37 Chinese fishermen arrested for fishing illegally are released.
- 8 August – Vavuniya prison riot: Mariadas Navis Dilrukshan (Dilrukshan Muthurasa), who had been in a coma since the riot, dies at Ragama Hospital.
- 19 August – The Kapilavastu relics arrive in Sri Lanka for a three-week exposition.
- 20 August – Three French tourists are arrested in Galle for taking pictures of themselves with Buddha statues and pretending to kiss one of them.
- 21 August – Three French tourists are given suspended six-month prison sentences for "wounding the religious feelings of Buddhists" by taking pictures of themselves with Buddha statues and pretending to kiss one of them.
- 23 August – The government closes all universities in the country amidst a strike by lecturers.
- 23 August – The abandoned MV Thermopylae Sierra sinks off the coast of Panadura, releasing a 10 km long oil slick some of which washes ashore.
- 27 August – Government minister Risad Badhiutheen appears before magistrate Ranga Dassanayake in Mannar, accused of threatening to kill magistrate Anthonypillai Judeson, and is released on bail.
- 5 September – Chinese national Chow Wan swallows a fake diamond at the FACET 2012 gem exhibition at Bandaranaike Memorial International Conference Hall whilst his accomplice steals a Rs 1.8 million ($13,000) diamond.
- 6 September – Universities re-open but the lecturers continue to strike.
- 8 September – Provincial council election: The United People's Freedom Alliance retains control of North Central Provincial Council and Sabaragamuwa Provincial Council but loses overall control of Eastern Provincial Council.
- 9 September – Army Major Chandana Pradeep Susena and a corporal are assaulted by Malaka Silva, son of government minister Mervyn Silva, and six others in the car park of the JAIC-Hilton Colombo hotel.
- 18 September – Impeachment of Shirani Bandaranayake: Supreme Court determines that the Divi Neguma Bill was in respect of matters set out in the provincial council list and therefore cannot become law unless it has been referred to every provincial council.
- 21 September – Frederica Jansz sacked as editor of The Sunday Leader newspaper.
- 22 September – Five people drown when a boat carrying Sanasa Development Bank staff and family capsizes off Beruwala.
- 24 September
  - Menik Farm IDP camp closed.
  - Malini Fonseka resigns from Parliament.
- 26 September – S. M. Chandrasena resigns as Minister of Agrarian Services and Wildlife.

=== October to December ===
- 4 October – Bodu Bala Sena hold a protest at the Bangladeshi High Commission in Colombo against the anti-Buddhist riots in Bangladesh.
- 5 October – S. M. Chandrasena appointed Deputy Minister of Agrarian Services and Wildlife.
- 9 October – Malini Fonseka is sworn as a Member of Parliament.
- 10 October – The Local Authorities Elections (Amendment) and Local Authority (Special Provisions) bills, which replace the existing proportional representation electoral system with first-past-the-post voting for local authorities, are passed at the third reading in Parliament.
- 14 October – Bodu Bala Sena storm a house in Batakettara, Homagama, Piliyandala where it alleged a Christian pastor called Dinesh and others from an evangelical group called The Name of Lord Jesus were trying to convert Sinhalese Buddhists.
- 25 October – Bodu Bala Sena hold a protest rally in Badulla against alleged conversion, vandalism of Buddhist sites and Islamic terrorism.
- 30 October – Cyclone Nilam causes severe rain and flooding in north eastern Sri Lanka, killing ten and displacing 4,000.
- 31 October – Impeachment of Shirani Bandaranayake: Supreme Court determines that clause 8(2) of the Divi Neguma Bill was unconstitutional and needed to be approved by a referendum; twelve other clauses were inconsistent with the constitution and needed to be passed by special majority (two-thirds) of Parliament; the governor of the Northern Province does not have the power to endorse the bill and therefore Parliament needed to pass the bill by special majority.
- 1 November – Impeachment of Shirani Bandaranayake: Impeachment motion against Bandaranayake signed by 117 United People's Freedom Alliance MPs handed to Speaker Chamal Rajapaksa.
- 9 November – Welikada prison riot: 27 prisoners are killed by the Special Task Force during riots at the Welikada Prison, Colombo.
- 14 November – The Secretary-General's Internal Review Panel on United Nations Action in Sri Lanka report is published.
- 19 November – Tangalle murder and gang rape: Eight suspects, including Sampath Chandra Pushpa Vidanapathirana, the United People's Freedom Alliance chairman of Tangalle Pradeshiya Sabha, are released on bail.
- 23 November – Impeachment of Shirani Bandaranayake: Parliamentary Select Committee meets to discuss impeachment charges.
- 27 November – Security forces enter the grounds of the University of Jaffna to disrupt students commemorating Maaveerar Day (Heroes Day).
- 28 November – Security forces clash with students protesting outside the University of Jaffna.
- 4 December – Impeachment of Shirani Bandaranayake: Parliamentary Select Committee meets to discuss impeachment charges.
- 6 December – Impeachment of Shirani Bandaranayake: Parliamentary Select Committee meets to discuss impeachment charges.
- 7 December – Impeachment of Shirani Bandaranayake: Opposition MPs withdraw from Parliamentary Select Committee.
- 8 December – Impeachment of Shirani Bandaranayake: Parliamentary Select Committee's report is presented to Parliament - three of five charges against Bandaranayake had been proven and this was enough to remove her from office.

== Deaths ==
=== January ===
- 4 January – N. G. P. Panditharatne, politician.
- 10 January – Anadapiya Kudathini, poet.
- 13 January – Roland A. Fernando, (dramatist)
- 15 January – Stanley Liyanage, (musician)

=== February ===
- 2 February – Punyasena Gunasinghe, (dramatist)
- 9 February – Leelananda R. Gunawardena, (author)
- 21 February – Ranil Abeynaike, cricketer (b. 1955).
- 23 February – E. M. G. Edirisinghe, (author)

=== March ===
- 11 March – Girley Gunawardana, 76 (actress)
- 17 March – Derrick de Silva, 70 (musician)
- 19 March – Anton Jude, 51 (actor).

=== April ===
- 14 April
  - Chandrakeerthi Kularatne, (dramatist)
  - Prematilaka Mapitigama, 82 (civil servant)
- 19 April – Nurania Hassan, Sri Lanka Broadcasting Corporation Tamil cricket commentator.
- 23 April – Sathish Perera, 42 (singer).

=== May ===
- 10 May – Vincent David, (filmmaker)

=== June ===
- 10 June – Janesh Silva, 50 (actor)
- 15 June
  - Nawanandana Wijesinghe (actor)
  - Victor Ramanayake, 59 (actor)
- 19 June – Suminda Weerasinghe, (cinematographer)
- 20 June
  - Nishshanka Weerasinghe, (dramatist)
  - Udaya Thalpawila, 51 (actor)

=== July ===
- 3 July – S. M. Seneviratne, 91 (archeologist)
- 8 July – Geethanjana Mendis, neuro physician and head of Sports Medicine Unit, Ministry of Sports.
- 11 July – Valentine Fernando, (actor)
- 12 July – Norbert Rathnasiri, (cameraman)
- 15 July – Harun Saba, (musician)
- 20 July – Nimal Lakshapathiaarachi, broadcaster.
- 27 July – Wasantha Kumara Dep, (actor)
- 29 July – Ranjith Jayasuriya, (actor)

=== August ===
- 2 August – Sena Fonseka, (virindu player)
- 7 August – S. V. Chandran, (scriptwriter)
- 29 August – Weweldeniye Medhalankara, monk (b. 1909).

=== September ===
- 1 September – Wijeyapala Mendis, politician (b. 1928).
- 7 September – Thilak Jayaratne, (journalist)

=== October ===
- 1 October – Nalaka Wedamulla, 40 (teledrama director)
- 13 October – Wasantha Kiriwattuduwa, 62 (actress)
- 19 October – Lal Piyasena, (film editor)
- 25 October – Welithara a. Ranasinghe, (civil servant)
- 30 October – Carlo Wijesiri, (musician)

=== November ===
- 19 November – Chandrasiri Sevikrama, (actor)

=== December ===
- 3 December – Mohamed Maharoof, politician.
- 4 December – Hemapala Gallage, 53 (tabla player)
- 28 December – S. Selvasekaran, 65 (actor)

== See also ==
- Years in Sri Lanka
