= 2013 in Sri Lanka =

- Decades: 1990s; 2000s; 2010s; 2020s
- See also: Other events of 2013; Timeline of Sri Lankan history

Events from the year 2013 in Sri Lanka.

== Incumbents ==
- President – Mahinda Rajapaksa
- Prime Minister – D. M. Jayaratne
- Chief Justice – Shirani Bandaranayake (until 13 January); Mohan Peiris (from 15 January)

=== Governors ===
- Central Province – Tikiri Kobbekaduwa
- Eastern Province – Mohan Wijewickrama
- North Central Province – Karunarathna Divulgane
- Northern Province – G. A. Chandrasiri
- North Western Province – Tissa Balalla
- Sabaragamuwa Province – W. J. M. Lokubandara
- Southern Province – Kumari Balasuriya
- Uva Province – Nanda Mathew
- Western Province – Alavi Moulana

=== Chief Ministers ===
- Central Province – Sarath Ekanayake
- Eastern Province – M. N. Abdul Majeed
- North Central Province – S. M. Ranjith
- Northern Province – C. V. Vigneswaran (starting 7 October)
- North Western Province – Athula Wijesinghe (until 3 October); Dayasiri Jayasekara (starting 3 October)
- Sabaragamuwa Province – Maheepala Herath
- Southern Province – Shan Wijayalal De Silva
- Uva Province – Shasheendra Rajapaksa
- Western Province – Prasanna Ranatunga

== Events ==
=== January to March ===
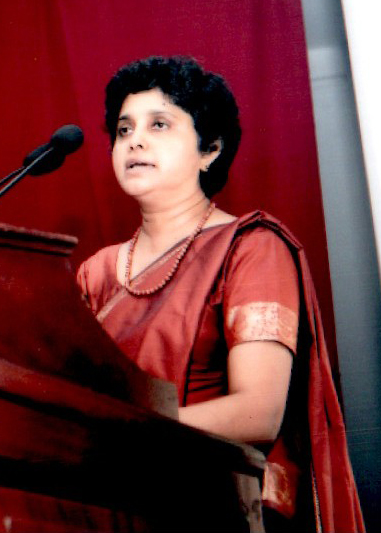
13 January: Chief Justice Shirani Bandaranayake removed from office

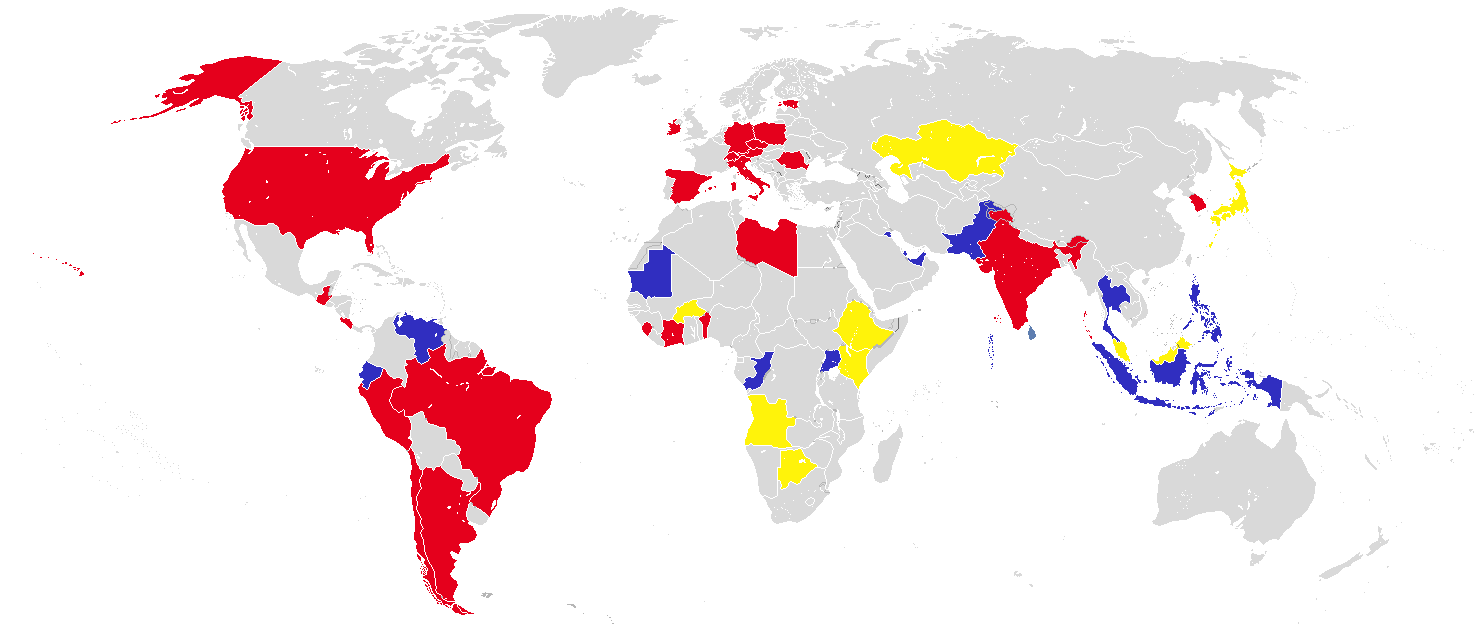
21 March: United Nations Human Rights Council passes resolution 22/1 on Sri Lanka

- 1 January – Impeachment of Shirani Bandaranayake: Supreme Court rules that the Parliamentary Select Committee had no power to investigate allegations against the chief justice and the impeachment was therefore unconstitutional.
- 7 January
  - Impeachment of Shirani Bandaranayake: Court of Appeal quashes the Parliamentary Select Committee's findings.
  - Bodu Bala Sena storm Sri Lanka Law College in Hultsdorf, Colombo, alleging that exam results were being distorted in favour of Muslim students.
- 8 January – Impeachment of Shirani Bandaranayake: The amended Divi Neguma Bill is passed by Parliament with the required two-thirds majority.
- 10 January – Nagesh Pratheepan and two other Uthayan distributors are attacked and newspapers torched by four men on two motorbikes in the Valvettithurai area.
- 11 January – Impeachment of Shirani Bandaranayake: Parliament votes by 155 to 49 to impeach Bandaranayake.
- 13 January – Impeachment of Shirani Bandaranayake: President Mahinda Rajapaksa ratifies the impeachment motion and removes Bandaranayake from office.
- 15 January – Impeachment of Shirani Bandaranayake: Attorney General Mohan Peiris sworn in as new chief justice.
- 21 January – Bodu Bala Sena storm the Cinnamon Bay Hotel in Moragalla, Beruwala, alleging that the premises contained a "Buddha bar".
- 23 January – A 47-year-old woman is gang raped by four auto rickshaw drivers at Wijerama Temple Mawatha, Nugegoda.
- 28 January – President Mahinda Rajapaksa carries out a cabinet re-shuffle, appointing some new ministers and deputy ministers - 96 United People's Freedom Alliance MPs were now part of the government.
- 15 February – The Sunday Leader journalist Faraz Shauketaly shot at his home in Mount Lavinia.
- 17 February – Bodu Bala Sena hold a meeting in Maharagama, Colombo which is attended by around 16,000 people including 1,300 monks.
- 15 March – British tourist Antony Ratcliffe is refused entry into the country at Bandaranaike International Airport because he had a "disrespectful" tattoo of Buddha on his arm.
- 17 March – Bodu Bala Sena hold a rally in Kandy at which it announced that it would work to remove a 10th-century mosque at the Kuragala Buddhist monastery complex in Ratnapura District.
- 21 March – The United Nations Human Rights Council votes by 25 to 13 to pass resolution 22/1 on Sri Lanka despite opposition from the Sri Lankan government.
- 24 March – Bodu Bala Sena hold a rally in Panadura at which it called on the country to rally against Christian and Muslim extremists, insisting Sri Lanka was a Sinhala Buddhist country, not a multiracial or multi-religious country.
- 25 March
  - Nationwide protest by Muslims against the anti-Muslim campaigns being carried out by the Bodu Bala Sena and Jathika Hela Urumaya.
  - Hartal was observed in the Eastern Province against the Bodu Bala Sena's anti-Muslim stance.
- 26 March – The BBC suspends broadcasting via the Sri Lanka Broadcasting Corporation after the SLBC jammed the broadcast on 16,17,18 and 25 March.
- 28 March – The Muslim owned Fashion Bug clothes shop in Pepiliyana, Colombo District is attacked by a mob led by Buddhist monks.

=== April to June ===
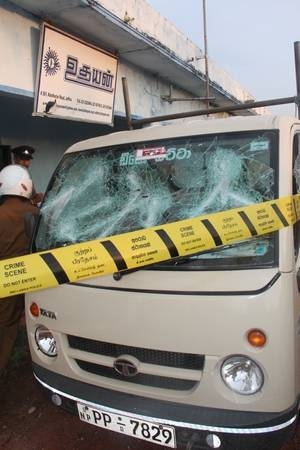
3 April: Uthayan office in Kilinochchi attacked

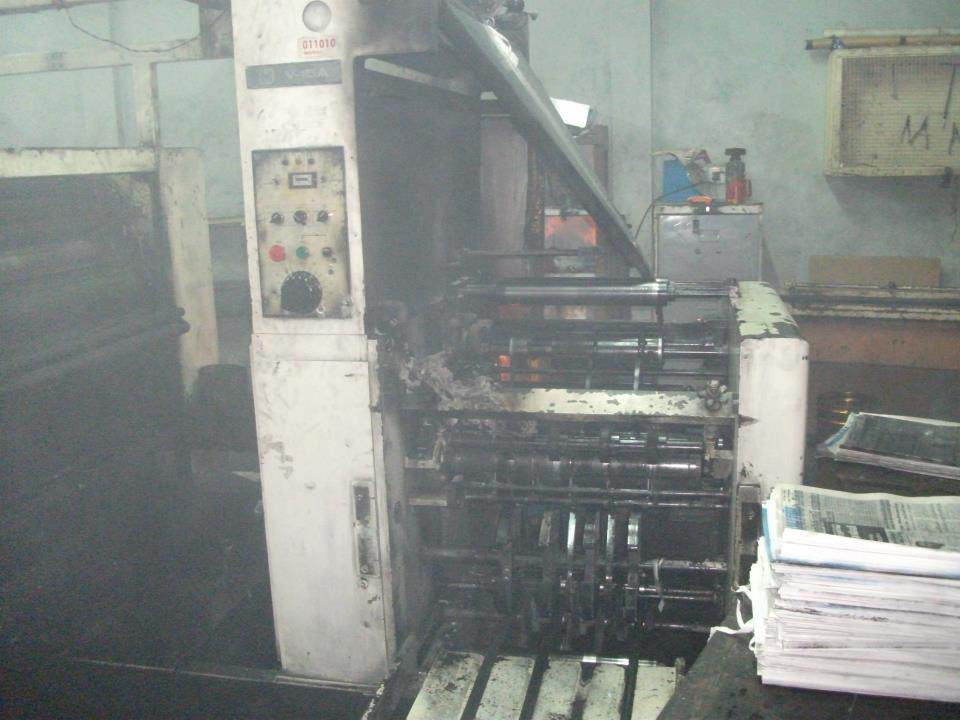
13 April: Uthayan office in Jaffna attacked

- 3 April – The Uthayan newspaper's office in Kilinochchi were attacked by a group of six masked Sinhala-speaking men, injuring five employees, two seriously, and damaging equipment and vehicles.
- 13 April – Three men came to the Uthayan newspaper's office in Jaffna and threatened security guards before damaging equipment and setting the printing press ablaze.
- 20 April – New electricity tariffs come into force which will see some consumers bills increasing by 127%.
- 24 April – The government forcibly acquire 2,578 hectares (6,370 acres; 9.95 sq mi) of land in northern Valikamam for a military cantonment, claiming none of owners could be traced.
- 5 May – President Mahinda Rajapaksa's son Rohitha Rajapaksa is alleged to have assaulted referee Dimitri Gunasekera during an Inter-Club Rugby Sevens Championship match at Havelock Park between Navy SC and Police SC A.
- 12 May – Cyclone Mahasen causes floods and landslides in northern Sri Lanka, killing seven and displacing 3,881.
- 22 May – Mohamed Shiyam murder: Footwear businessman Mohammed Muzamdeen Mohammed Shiyam goes missing after dining with friend Mohammed Fouzdeen in a suburb of Colombo.
- 24 May
  - Buddhist monk Bowatte Indrasara, a Sinhala Ravaya activist, self-immolates outside the Temple of the Tooth in protest against the slaughter of cattle and conversion of Buddhists.
  - Mohamed Shiyam murder: Body of Mohamed Shiyam found in Dompe. Gampaha District.
- 25 May – Buddhist monk Bowatte Indrasara dies in Colombo National Hospital.
- 4 June
  - Rajapaksha Mudiyansalage Premadasa, the Vedda chief folk priest at the Siva temple at Valli Kukai cave in Chella Kathirkamam, is stabbed to death in Kataragama.
  - Ajith Mannapperuma is sworn as a Member of Parliament, replacing Jayalath Jayawardena.
- 8 June – More than 40 fishermen are killed by monsoon storms off the south west coast of Sri Lanka.
- 10 June – Mohamed Shiyam murder: DIG Vaas Gunawardena arrested in connection with murder.
- 11 June – Mohamed Shiyam murder: Colombo Magistrate's Court allow the Criminal Investigation Department to detain DIG Vaas Gunawardena for 90 days under the Prevention of Terrorism Act.

=== July to September ===
- 2 July – The 1 July issue of Time magazine, whose cover features a picture of Burmese extremist monk Ashin Wirathu with the headline "The Face of Buddhist Terror", is banned in Sri Lanka because it "could hurt the religious sentiments of the people".
- 5 July
  - Trincomalee massacre of students: 12 Special Task Force personnel are arrested in connection with the killing of five students in January 2006.
  - Noori violence: Nihal Perera, the Superintendent of the Noori Tea Estate in Deraniyagala, is hacked to death by a group of 15 men including a local politician.
  - Provincial council election: President Mahinda Rajapaksa issues a proclamation ordering the Election Commissioner to conduct elections for the Northern Provincial Council.
  - Provincial council election: Central Provincial Council and North Western Provincial Council dissolved by their governors.
- 9 July – Noori violence: Nine suspects including Anil Champika Wijesinghe (alias Atha Kota), the former United People's Freedom Alliance chairman of Deraniyagala Pradeshiya Sabha, are remanded till 15 July over the killing of Nihal Perera.
- 12 July – The Flying Fish film is banned for insulting the armed forces.
- 15 July – Noori violence: 19 suspects including Anil Champika Wijesinghe (alias Atha Kota) are remanded till 24 July over the killing of Nihal Perera.
- 17 July – Noori violence: Entire Deraniyagala police transferred to other stations.
- 24 July – Provincial council election: United National Party MP Dayasiri Jayasekara resigns from Parliament to contest the provincial council election as the United People's Freedom Alliance's chief ministerial candidate in the North Western Province.
- 29 July – Malaka Silva, son of government minister Mervyn Silva, is assaulted by a group men in the car park of the Odel store in Town Hall, Colombo.
- 31 July – Noori violence: 21 suspects are remanded till 5 August over the killing of Nihal Perera.
- 1 August – Three people are killed after the Army opens fire on a group of people protesting against contaminated water in Weliweriya, Gampaha District.
- 5 August – Noori violence: 22 suspects are remanded till 19 August over the killing of Nihal Perera.
- 8 August – Nilantha Bandara is sworn as a Member of Parliament, replacing Dayasiri Jayasekara.
- 10 August – A mosque in Grandpass, Colombo is attacked a mob of Buddhists.
- 24 August – Five men attack and rob the home of The Sunday Leader journalist Mandana Ismail Abeywickrema in Bambalapitiya, Colombo.
- 25 August – United Nations High Commissioner for Human Rights Navi Pillay arrives in Sri Lanka for a week-long fact finding mission which will include visiting the former war ravaged areas in the north and east.
- 26 August – Responsibility for the Sri Lanka Police Service passes from the Ministry of Defence and Urban Development to the newly created Ministry of Law and Order, with President Mahinda Rajapaksa as the new Minister of Law and Order and Major General Nanda Mallawarachchi as the ministry's secretary.
- 30 August – Customs officials in Colombo seize 131.1488 kilograms (289.134 lb) of pure heroin, worth about US$19 million, in shipment from Karachi, Pakistan, in what is believed to the largest seizure of heroin in South Asia. It is later revealed that the shipment had a letter from Prime Minister D. M. Jayaratne's office requesting a waiver of import duties.
- 31 August – At the end of her visit to Sri Lanka United Nations High Commissioner for Human Rights Navi Pillay issues a statement highly critical of the government, saying that the country is heading in an "authoritarian direction".
- 2 September
  - Mahaguruge Francis Nelson, Tamil political prisoner in Magazine Prison and a close relative of senior Liberation Tigers of Tamil Eelam commander Paul Raj, is found dead.
  - BBC Tamil service journalist Ponnaiah Manikavasagam is interrogated by the Terrorism Investigation Department without the presence of a lawyer about phone conversations he had with two Tamil prisoners in Magazine Prison.
- 6 September – Lasantha Wickrematunge murder: Mount Lavinia magistrate Rangajeeva Wimalasena acquits and releases army intelligence officer Kandegedera Priyawansa.
- 13 September – Seventy-eight-year-old Vairamuttu Thirunavukkarasu is killed by a train on a trial run as he crossed the railway line on a bicycle at an unprotected crossing at the 155th Mile Post near Kilinochchi.
- 14 September
  - Haiti Sex abuse: An 18-year-old Haitian woman is raped by a Sri Lankan soldier, part of the United Nations Stabilisation Mission in Haiti, on Route National 2 near Léogâne.
  - Rail services resume on the Northern Line between Omanthai and Kilinochchi after an interruption of 23 years due to the civil war.
- 16 September – Provincial council election: Tamil National Alliance activist Rasiah Kavithan is clubbed to death by United People's Freedom Alliance supporters in Puthukkudiyiruppu, Mullaitivu District.
- 18 September – Hindu priest Thamodaran Pillai Manotharan is hacked to death at a temple in Aanbankulam, Kilinochchi District.
- 20 September – Provincial council election: A group of around 70 armed men in military uniform attack the home of Tamil National Alliance candidate Ananthi Sasitharan in Chulipuram, injuring some of her supporters and an election monitor.
- 21 September
  - Provincial council election: A fake edition of the pro-Tamil National Alliance newspaper Uthayan appears, falsely claiming that the TNA was boycotting the election and that TNA candidate Ananthi Sasitharan had defected to the governing United People's Freedom Alliance.
  - Provincial council election: The Tamil National Alliance wins the first election for the Northern Provincial Council; the United People's Freedom Alliance retains control of Central Provincial Council and North Western Provincial Council.
- 24 September
  - A two-year-old baby is killed and eight others injured in an accident on the Southern Expressway between Dodangoda and Gelanigama.
  - A man is killed and two boys injured by a landmine near the Muhamalai Forward Defence Line.
  - Seven people who had swallowed 25 pieces of gold are arrested at Bandaranaike International Airport as they tried to board a flight to Chennai.
- 26 September – The Supreme Court rules that powers over state land remains with the central government, not provincial government.

=== October to December ===
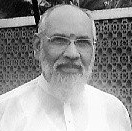
7 October: C. V. Vigneswaran becomes the first Chief Minister of the Northern Province

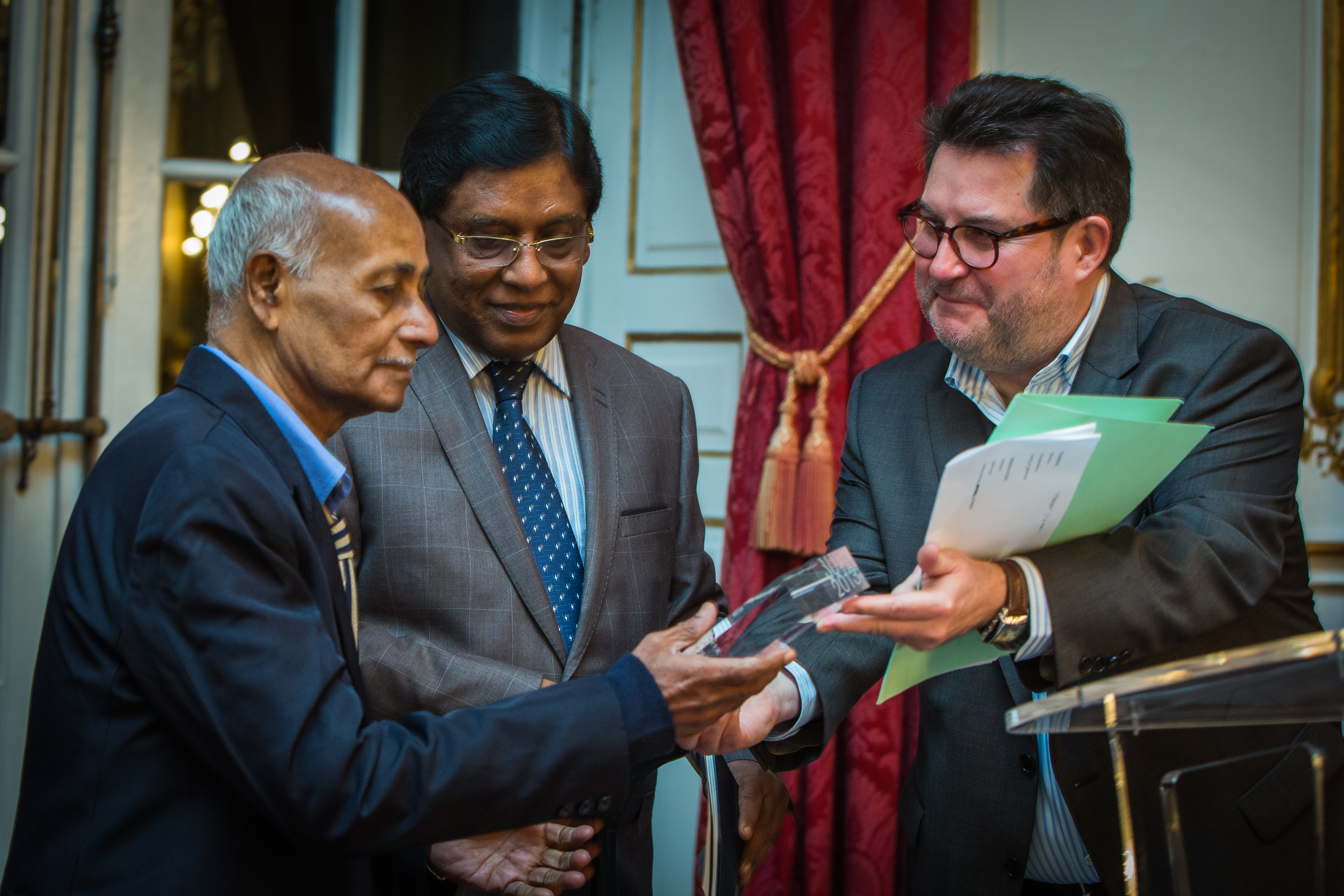
27 November: Uthayan editor V. Kanamaylnathan receives the 2013 Reporters Without Borders Press Freedom Prize from TV5Monde news director Pascal Guimier at Strasbourg City Hall

- 3 October
  - Provincial council election: Sarath Ekanayake (incumbent) and Dayasiri Jayasekara take oath, as Chief Minister of Central and North Western provinces respectively, in front of President Mahinda Rajapaksa at the Presidential Secretariat.
  - The home of V. Prabhakaran in Puthukkudiyiruppu is blown up by the Sri Lanka Army.
- 5 October – Five people drown when a boat carrying 18 people capsizes off Mullikulam, Mannar District.
- 7 October – Provincial council election: C. V. Vigneswaran takes oath as Chief Minister of Northern Province in front of President Mahinda Rajapaksa at the Presidential Secretariat.
- 9 October – Former Football Federation of Sri Lanka chief Manilal Fernando is banned for life by FIFA after losing an appeal against a corruption conviction.
- 10 October – Nine new deputy ministers are sworn in front of President Mahinda Rajapaksa at the Presidential Secretariat.
- 14 October – Vavuniya prison riot: The Supreme Court dismisses a fundamental rights case brought by the parents of Ganesan Nimalaruban who died in the riots.
- 17 October – Tangalle murder and gang rape: Six suspects (United People's Freedom Alliance chairman of Tangalle Pradeshiya Sabha Sampath Chandra Pushpa Vidanapathirana, B. A. Lahiru Kelum, Saman Deshapriya, W. Preneeth Chaturanga, M. Sarath Herath, Sugan, S. P. Preneeth Chaturanga, H. G. Nuwan Chinthaka Herath and E. P. Nadeera Shamel) are charged with murder, gang rape and possession of unlawful weapons.
- 18 October – The badly decomposed body of Markandu Yogaranym, a mentally handicapped woman who had been raped and murdered, is found in the grounds of Nachiyar Hindu Temple, Jaffna.
- 26 October – Three people, including an infant, are killed when a van crashes into a stationary lorry at Kaluwaragaswewa on the Puttalam-Anuradhapura road.
- 27 October – The Colombo–Katunayake Expressway is officially opened by President Mahinda Rajapaksa.
- 29 October – The body of Amirthalingam Maithili is found inside a well in Puttur.
- 30 October – Immigration and defence officials raid a media workshop at the Hotel Galadari, Colombo organised by the Free Media Movement, detaining the International Federation of Journalists Asia-Pacific Director Jacqui Park and Asia-Pacific Deputy Director Jane Worthington.
- 31 October – UK broadcaster Channel 4 airs more video which it claims shows LTTE TV presenter Isaipriya alias Shoba in Sri Lankan military custody before she is raped and murdered.
- 1 November – Jacqui Park and Jane Worthington of the International Federation of Journalists are deported to Australia after two days of "extensive interrogation" by defence and immigration officials.
- 4 November
  - Twelve people are killed and scores injured when a bus travelling from Bandarawela to Poonagala skids off the road at Mapitiya and falls into a 300 feet precipice.
  - Five members of the same family are hacked to death in Halmillakulama, Anuradhapura District.
- 10 November – Immigration officials raid a press conference in Colombo organised by the Tamil National Alliance, detaining New Zealand Green Party MP Jan Logie and Australian Green senator Lee Rhiannon and confiscating their passports. The pair are questioned for hours before being allowed to leave the country.
- 15 November
  - The 23rd Commonwealth Heads of Government Meeting begins amidst controversy over host Sri Lanka's human rights record and alleged war crimes during the final stages of the civil war. The meeting is boycotted by the Canadian, Indian and Mauritian prime ministers.
  - British Prime Minister David Cameron visits Jaffna Peninsula, the first foreign leader to visit northern Sri Lanka.
- 17 November
  - Five people are killed as a van collides with a bus in Thalathuoya, Kandy District.
  - The controversial Commonwealth Heads of Government Meeting ends with the adoption of the Colombo Declaration on Sustainable, Inclusive and Equitable Development.
- 22 November – Tangalle murder and gang rape: United People's Freedom Alliance chairman of Tangalle Pradeshiya Sabha Sampath Chandra Pushpa Vidanapathirana and six other accused plead not guilty and are released on bail by Colombo High Court.
- 23 November – Deputy Economic Development Minister S. M. Chandrasena is sworn in as Cabinet Minister for Special Projects.
- 24 November – A 20-year-old woman is gang raped by five men in Palaviya near Puttalam.
- 26 November – Daniel Rexian (alias Rajeev), the Eelam People's Democratic Party chairman of Delft Divisional Council, is shot dead at his home on Pungudutivu.
- 27 November – The Jaffna based Uthayan newspaper and Uzbek journalist Muhammad Bekjanov win the 2013 Reporters Without Borders Press Freedom Prize.
- 28 November – A six-month island-wide census of people killed, missing and property damage during the Sri Lankan Civil War begins.
- 30 November – A fire at Bandaranaike Memorial International Conference Hall destroys 200 exhibits at an inventions exhibitions.
- 4 December – K. Kamalendran, the United People's Freedom Alliance opposition leader of Northern Provincial Council, is arrested and remanded over the killing of Delft Divisional Council chairman Daniel Rexian (alias Rajeev).
- 6 December – Around 100 shops on Bodhiraja Mawatha, Pettah are destroyed by fire, suspected to be arson.
- 7 December – During a parliamentary debate, United People's Freedom Alliance MP J. R. P. Suriyapperuma launches a tirade against foreign leaders, calling US President Barack Obama a kalla (nigger) whose skull will be smashed by Russia and China.
- 9 December – Prime Minister D. M. Jayaratne's Coordinating Secretary Keerthi Sri Weerasinghe resigns over the heroin letter affair but denies any involvement in heroin smuggling.
- 10 December
  - The second session of the Permanent People’s Tribunal on Sri Lanka in Bremen finds Sri Lanka guilty of genocide.
  - A peaceful demonstration by families of disappeared people in Trincomalee to mark Human Rights Day is attacked by a group of masked men.
- 12 December – The European Parliament passes a resolution on Sri Lanka which, amongst other things, urges the Sri Lankan government to fully implement the recommendations of the Lessons Learnt and Reconciliation Commission and initiate an independent and credible investigation into alleged wartime violations by March 2014.
- 13 December – Police seize 10 kilograms (22 lb) of heroin in Hikkaduwa.
- 18 December – Deputy Minister of Economic Development Susantha Punchinilame is cleared of the murder of MP Nalanda Ellawala and police constable T. M. Jayasena on 11 February 1997 in Kuruwita.
- 20 December – A mass grave with at least ten skeletal remains is found near Thiruketheeswaram temple, Mannar District.
- 27 December – Three people are killed near Waduruwa after they jumped off a train on fire and were hit by another train travelling in the opposite direction.

== Deaths ==
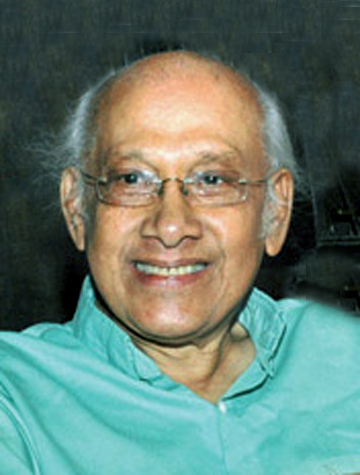
Sucharitha Gamlath, 1934-2013

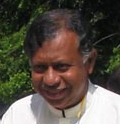
Jayalath Jayawardena, 1953-2013

=== January ===
- 12 January – Guy de Alwis, cricketer (b. 1959).
- 13 January
  - Wickrama Bogoda, 72 (actor)
  - Festus Perera, politician.
- 17 January
  - Tissa Balasuriya, priest and theologian (b. 1924).
- 18 January – A. R. B. Amerasinghe, Puisne Justice of the Supreme Court of Sri Lanka (b. 1937).
- 29 January
  - W. Karunajeewa, banker.
  - Ravindra Lal Perera, trade unionist and political activist.

=== March ===
- 1 March – D. V. J. Harischandra, physician (b. 1938).
- 5 March – Pulavar Parvathinathasivam, poet, author, journalist and newspaper editor (b. 1936).
- 17 March – Janadasa Peiris, politician and journalist (b. 1942).
- 24 March – Patrick Denipitiya, musician (b. 1934).
- 30 March – Sucharitha Gamlath, academic and linguist (b. 1934).

=== April ===
- 8 April – J. F. A. Soza, Puisne Justice of the Supreme Court of Sri Lanka (b. 1919).
- 16 April – Santin Gunawardana, actor (b. 1938).
- 28 April – Jayatilake Podinilame, politician.

=== May ===
- 21 May – Daya T. Pasqual, politician (b. 1912).
- 30 May – Jayalath Jayawardena, politician and physician (b. 1953).

=== June ===
- 9 June – K. T. Francis, cricket umpire (b. 1939).

=== July ===
- 26 July – Maurice Dahanayake, singer and actor.

=== August ===
- 6 August – Seetha Kumari, actress.
- 11 August – Denis Perera, army officer (b. 1930).
- 15 August – Selliah Ponnadurai, cricket umpire (b. 1935).

=== September ===
- 9 September – Sunila Abeysekera, human rights activist (b. 1952).
- 15 September – Asitha Perera, politician and diplomat.
- 27 September
  - Berty Premalal Dissanayake, politician (b. 1954).
  - Aluthwewa Soratha Nayaka, monk (b. 1943).

=== November ===
- 2 November – Gamani Corea, economist (b. 1925).
- 7 November – C. R. De Silva, lawyer.
- 28 November – R. I. T. Alles, teacher and civil servant (b. 1932).
- 29 November – Baku Mahadeva, civil servant (b. 1921).

== See also ==
- Years in Sri Lanka
