= 2015 in Sri Lanka =

- Decades: 1990s; 2000s; 2010s; 2020s
- See also: Other events of 2015; Timeline of Sri Lankan history

The following lists notable events that took place during the year 2015 in Sri Lanka.

== Incumbents ==
- President: Mahinda Rajapaksa (until 9 January), Maithripala Sirisena (from 9 January)
- Prime Minister: D. M. Jayaratne (until 9 January), Ranil Wickremesinghe (from 9 January)

=== Governors ===
- Central Province – Tikiri Kobbekaduwa (until 19 January); Surangani Ellawala (from 27 January)
- Eastern Province – Mohan Wijewickrama (until January); Austin Fernando (from January)
- North Central Province – Karunarathna Divulgane (until 27 January); P. B. Dissanayake (from 27 January)
- Northern Province – G. A. Chandrasiri (until 27 January); H. M. G. S. Palihakkara (from 27 January)
- North Western Province – Tissa Balalla (until 23 January); Amara Piyaseeli Ratnayake (from 23 January)
- Sabaragamuwa Province – W. J. M. Lokubandara (until 27 January); Marshal Perera (from 27 January)
- Southern Province – Kumari Balasuriya (until 23 January); Hemakumara Nanayakkara (from 23 January)
- Uva Province – Nanda Mathew (until 27 January); M. P. Jayasinghe (from 27 January)
- Western Province – Alavi Moulana (until 23 January); K. C. Logeswaran (from 23 January)

=== Chief Ministers ===
- Central Province – Sarath Ekanayake
- Eastern Province – M. N. Abdul Majeed (until 6 February); Ahamed Nazeer Zainulabdeen (from 6 February)
- North Central Province – S. M. Ranjith (until 28 January); Peshala Jayarathne (from 28 January)
- Northern Province – C. V. Vigneswaran
- North Western Province – Dayasiri Jayasekara (until 8 September); Dharmasiri Dassanayake (from 8 September)
- Sabaragamuwa Province – Maheepala Herath
- Southern Province – Shan Wijayalal De Silva
- Uva Province:
  - until 14 January – Shasheendra Rajapaksa
  - 14 January–1 September – Harin Fernando
  - from 15 September – Chamara Sampath Dassanayake
- Western Province – Prasanna Ranatunga (until 4 May); Isura Devapriya (from 4 May)

== Events ==
=== January ===
- 8 January – 2015 Sri Lankan presidential election: Over 12 million voters elect a new president. Incumbent president Mahinda Rajapaksa ran for a third term as a candidate of the UPFA. His main challenger is joint opposition candidate and former Minister of Health Maithripala Sirisena. In a major upset, Sirisena wins with 51.28% of the vote, followed by Rajapaksa with 47.58% of the vote.
- 9 January:
  - Mahinda Rajapaksa concedes defeat to Maithripala Sirisena in the presidential election, and Sirisena is sworn in as the 7th President of Sri Lanka.
  - Prime Minister D. M. Jayaratne resigns, following their agreement prior to the election, United National Party leader Ranil Wickremesinghe is sworn in as the new prime minister by Sirisena.
- 11 January – The new Sri Lankan government announces that it will investigate allegations of a coup attempt by Mahinda Rajapaksa, said to be a bid by the former president to retain power after his defeat at the polls.

=== March ===
- 18 March – Sri Lankan cricketers Mahela Jayawardene and Kumar Sangakkara retire from One International Cricket following the team's defeat against South Africa. Jayawardene ends an 18-year career as the fifth highest ODI run scorer of all time. Sangakkara ends a 15-year career as second highest ODI scorer of all time.

=== May ===
- 13 May – Sivaloganathan Vithiya, an 18 year old schoolgirl in Pungudutivu is gang raped and murdered.

=== August ===
- 15 August – Sri Lankan cricketer Kumar Sangakkara officially retires from all International Cricket after his last Test match against India.
- 17 August – 2015 Sri Lankan parliamentary election: The United National Front for Good Governance led by the United National Party wins the most seats but fails to secure a majority in parliament, winning 45.66% of the popular vote and 106 seats.
- 21 August – Prime Minister Ranil Wickremesinghe, leader of the UNFGG and UNP, forms a national government with the support of UPFA MPs loyal to incumbent president Maithripala Sirisena.

== Deaths ==
=== February ===
- 1 February - Victor Wickramage, Actor
- 4 February - Sisira Senaratne ,79, Singer

=== April ===
- 27 April – Daya Alwis, 72, actor

=== May ===
- 12 May - Neranjan Wikcramasinghe, Politician
- 30 May – Somalatha Subasinghe, 78, actress

=== June ===
- 16 June – Tony Ranasinghe, 77, acter

=== September ===
- 26 September – Ana Seneviratne, 88, former Sri Lankan Inspector-General of Police

=== November ===
- 15 November – Damitha Saluwadane, 67, actress

=== December ===
- 3 December – Sunil Hettiarachchi, 78, actor
- 23 December – Christy Leonard Perera, 83, actor
