= List of hospitals in Eastern Province, Sri Lanka =

The following is a list of hospitals in Eastern Province, Sri Lanka. Five of the biggest government hospitals in the province are controlled by the central government in Colombo. All other government hospitals in the province are controlled by the provincial government in Trincomalee.

== Government hospitals ==
=== Teaching hospitals ===
- Batticaloa Teaching Hospital, Batticaloa District (central government)

=== District general hospitals ===
- Ampara District General Hospital, Ampara District (central government)
- Trincomalee District General Hospital, Trincomalee District

=== Base hospitals (type A) ===
- Ashraff Memorial Hospital (Kalmunai South Base Hospital), Ampara District (central government)
- Kalmunai North Base Hospital, Ampara District (central government)
- Kantalai Base Hospital, Trincomalee District (central government)
- Kinniya Base Hospital, Trincomalee District (Provincial government)
- Mutur Base Hospital, Trincomalee District (Provincial government)

=== Base hospitals (type B) ===
- Akkaraipattu Base Hospital, Ampara District (central government)
- Dehiattakandiya Base Hospital, Ampara District
- Kalavanchikudy Base Hospital, Batticaloa District
- Maha Oya Base Hospital, Ampara District
- Ninthavur Base Hospital, Ampara District
- Pottuvil Base Hospital, Ampara District
- Sammanthurai Base Hospital, Ampara District
- Thirukkovil Base Hospital, Ampara District
- Valaichchenai Base Hospital, Batticaloa District
- Kattankudy Base Hospital, Batticaloa District

== Divisional hospital (Type A) ==
- Periyakallar Divisional Hospital, Batticaloa District

=== Divisional hospitals (type B) ===
- Arayampathy District Hospital, Batticaloa District
- Chenkalady Rural Hospital, Batticaloa District
- Eravur District Hospital, Batticaloa District
- Karadiyanaru Divisional Hospital, Batticaloa District
- Karaitivu Peripheral Unit, Ampara District
- Manthivu Special Campaign Hospital, Batticaloa District
- Marathamunai Central Dispensary and Maternity Home, Ampara District
- Miravodai Rural Hospital, Batticaloa District
- Palamunai Peripheral Unit, Ampara District
- Sainthamaruthu District Hospital, Ampara District
- Vakarai Peripheral Unit, Batticaloa District

=== Divisional hospitals (type C) ===
- Addalachenai Dvisional Hospital, Ampara District
- Central Camp Peripheral Unit, Ampara District
- Damana Central Dispensary and Maternity Home, Ampara District
- Deegavapi Central Dispensary, Ampara District
- Gomarankadawala Rural Hospital, Trincomalee District
- Irrakam Central Dispensary, Ampara District
- Kilivetti Rural Hospital, Trincomalee District
- Kuchchaveli Rural Hospital, Trincomalee District
- Lahugala Rural Hospital, Ampara District
- Mandapathady Rural Hospital, Batticaloa District
- Nilaveli Rural Hospital, Trincomalee District
- Oluvil Central Dispensary and Maternity Home, Ampara District
- Padavi Siripura Peripheral Unit, Trincomalee District
- Palameenmadu Rural Hospital, Batticaloa District
- Palamunai Divisional Hospital, Batticaloa District
- Cheddipalayam Divisional Hospital, Batticaloa District
- Panama Central Dispensary and Maternity Home, Ampara District
- Pulmoddai Peripheral Unit, Trincomalee District
- Senarathpura Central Dispensary and Maternity Home, Ampara District
- Serunuvara Rural Hospital, Trincomalee District
- Thampalakamam Peripheral Unit, Trincomalee District
- Thoppur Central Dispensary, Trincomalee District
- Thottama Rural Hospital, Ampara District
- Wadinagala Rural Hospital, Ampara District

=== Primary Medical Care Units ===
- Ambagahawela Central Dispensary, Ampara District
- Annamalai Central Dispensary, Ampara District
- Bakiella Central Dispensary, Batticaloa District
- Batticaloa Chest Clinic, Batticaloa District
- Battukachchiya Central Dispensary, Trincomalee District
- Chenaikudiyruppu Central Dispensary, Ampara District
- China Bay Central Dispensary, Trincomalee District
- Ganthalawa Central Dispensary, Trincomalee District
- Himadhurawa Central Dispensary, Ampara District
- Kachchakodithivu Central Dispensary, Trincomalee District
- Kaluthavalai Central Dispensary, Batticaloa District
- Kankayanodai Central Dispensary, Batticaloa District
- Kappalthurai Central Dispensary, Trincomalee District
- Kathiraveli Central Dispensary, Batticaloa District
- Kavattamunai Central Dispensary, Batticaloa District
- Kekuluwela Central Dispensary, Ampara District
- Koddamunnai Central Dispensary, Batticaloa District
- Kokkadichcholai Central Dispensary and Maternity Home, Batticaloa District
- Koknahara Central Dispensary, Ampara District
- Komari Central Dispensary, Ampara District
- Lihiniyagama Central Dispensary, Ampara District
- Madawalanda Central Dispensary, Ampara District
- Mahadivulwewa Central Dispensary and Maternity Home, Trincomalee District
- Makilavedduvan Central Dispensary, Batticaloa District
- Makiloor Central Dispensary, Batticaloa District
- Malwatta Central Dispensary, Ampara District
- Mandur Central Dispensary and Maternity Home, Batticaloa District
- Mangalagama Central Dispensary, Ampara District
- Mankerni Central Dispensary, Batticaloa District
- Mavadivenpu Central Dispensary, Batticaloa District
- Mavadivenpu Mental Health Unit, Batticaloa District
- Meerakerny Central Dispensary, Batticaloa District
- Morawewa Central Dispensary and Maternity Home, Trincomalee District
- Mullipothana Central Dispensary, Trincomalee District
- Muwangala Central Dispensary, Ampara District
- Naduoothu Central Dispensary, Trincomalee District
- Namal Oya Central Dispensary, Ampara District
- Nawamadagama Central Dispensary, Ampara District
- Palayadivaddai Central Dispensary, Batticaloa District
- Panankadu Central Dispensary, Ampara District
- Pannalgama Central Dispensary, Ampara District
- Paragahakele Central Dispensary, Ampara District
- Plamunai Central Dispensary, Batticaloa District
- Sampalthivu Central Dispensary, Trincomalee District
- Sadunpura Central Dispensary, Ampara District
- Sampur Central Dispensary, Trincomalee District
- Santhively Central Dispensary, Batticaloa District
- Selvanayagapuram Central Dispensary, Trincomalee District
- Seruvila Central Dispensary and Maternity Home, Trincomalee District
- Siripura Central Dispensary, Ampara District
- Sorikalmunai Central Dispensary, Ampara District
- Tempitiya PMCU, Ampara District
- Thiraimadu Central Dispensary, Batticaloa District
- Thiriyai Central Dispensary, Trincomalee District
- Thuraimulavanie Central Dispensary and Maternity Home, Batticaloa District
- Uhana Central Dispensary, Ampara District
- Unnichchei Central Dispensary, Batticaloa District
- Wan Ela Central Dispensary and Maternity Home, Trincomalee District
- Weeragoda Central Dispensary, Ampara District
- Weheragala Central Dispensary, Ampara District

=== Unclassified ===
- Kakkamunai Central Dispensary, Trincomalee District
- Kalmunaikudy District Hospital, Ampara District
- Mawanawela Central Dispensary, Ampara District
- Padiyatalava Peripheral Unit, Ampara District
- Periyaneelavanai Central Dispensary and Maternity Home, Ampara District
- Pullumellai Central Dispensary, Batticaloa District

== Private hospitals ==
1. Prabhodha Hospital (Pvt) Ltd, Ampara, Ampara District

2. Genius Hospital (pvt) Ltd, Akkaraipattu, Ampara District

3. Mediland Hospital, Kalmunai, Ampara district

== See also ==
- List of hospitals in Sri Lanka
