= 2010 in Sri Lanka =

- Decades: 1990s; 2000s; 2010s; 2020s
- See also: Other events of 2010; Timeline of Sri Lankan history

The following lists notable events that took place during 2010 in Sri Lanka.

== Incumbents ==
- President – Mahinda Rajapaksa
- Prime Minister – Ratnasiri Wickremanayake (until 21 April), D. M. Jayaratne (from 21 April)
- Chief Justice – Asoka de Silva
- Speaker of the Parliament – W. J. M. Lokubandara (until 8 April), Chamal Rajapaksa (from 22 April)

=== Provincial Governors ===
- Central Province – Tikiri Kobbekaduwa
- Eastern Province – Mohan Wijewickrama
- North Central Province – Karunarathne Diulgane
- Northern Province – G.A. Chandrasiri
- North Western Province – Tissa Balalla
- Sabaragamuwa Province – Janaka Priyantha Bandara until April, Wijesinghe Lokubandara from April
- Southern Province – Kumari Balasuriya
- Uva Province – Nanda Mathew
- Western Province – Alavi Moulana

=== Chief Ministers ===
- Central Province – Sarath Ekanayake
- Eastern Province – S. Chandrakanthan
- North Central Province – Berty Premalal Dissanayake
- Northern Province – Vacant
- North Western Province – Athula Wijesinghe
- Sabaragamuwa Province – Maheepala Herath
- Southern Province – Shan Wijayalal De Silva
- Uva Province – Shashindra Rajapaksa
- Western Province – Prasanna Ranatunge

== Events ==
=== January ===
- 9 January – The Sri Lanka Army releases over 700 ex-LTTE members after a rehabilitation program.
- 12 January – President Mahinda Rajapaksa announces that Tamils will be given greater say in matters of governance, proposing power sharing agreements.
- 22 January – The home of an opposition activist is bombed in Colombo.
- 24 January – Former President Chandrika Kumaratunga endorses opposition candidate Sarath Fonseka in the upcoming elections.
- 26 January – 2010 Sri Lankan presidential election: Incumbent President Mahinda Rajapaksa is reelected to a second term, defeating opposition candidate and former commander of the Sri Lanka Army Sarath Fonseka.

=== April ===
- 8 April – The first round of the 2010 Sri Lankan parliamentary election is held.
- 20 April – 2010 Sri Lankan parliamentary election: Due to irregularities in two districts, polls were re-held. The ruling United People's Freedom Alliance led by President Mahinda Rajapaksa secures a landslide victory, obtaining 144 seats in the Parliament of Sri Lanka. The elections had the lowest voter turnout in Sri Lanka since independence.

=== May ===
- 31 May – Navi Pillay, United Nations High Commissioner for Human Rights, calls upon the Government of Sri Lanka to establish an independent international accountability mechanism to address the serious concerns which arose during the final stages of the Sri Lankan Civil War in 2009 at the opening of the fourteenth regular session of the Human Rights Council.

=== November ===
- 10–11 November – 2010 Colombo floods

== Deaths ==
=== January ===
1

- Periyasamy Chandrasekaran, 52, Sri Lankan politician, Member of Parliament, after short illness.

=== February ===
4

- H. A. Perera, 59, Sri Lankan actor, after short illness.

=== June ===
3

- K. M. M. B. Kulatunga, Sri Lankan puisne justice of the Supreme Court.

=== July ===
7

- Bob Harvie, cricket commentator

29

- C. I. Gunesekera, 90, Sri Lankan cricketer.

=== August ===
30

- Lakshman Jayakody, 80, Sri Lankan politician, Minister of Buddhist Affairs (1994–2000), after short illness.
