= Samarakoon =

Samarakoon (Sinhala: සමරකෝන්) is a name found in Sri Lanka. It can be both a surname and a family name. Notable people with this name include:

== Family name ==
- S. M. Chandrasena, a Sri Lankan politician
- Samarakoon Mudiyanselage Ranjith, another Sri Lankan politician

== Surname ==
- Ananda Samarakoon (1911 – 1962), a Sri Lankan musician
- Lahiru Samarakoon (born 1997), a Sri Lankan cricketer
- Mangala Samarakoon (born 1980), a former Sri Lankan sport shooter
- Neville Samarakoon (1919 – 1990), a Sri Lankan judge
- R. R. Samarakoon (1939 – 2010), a Sri Lankan actor and playwright

== See also ==
- Pseudophilautus samarakoon, an endangered species of frogs native to Sri Lanka
