= TYO =

TYO may refer to:

- The IATA airport code for the Tokyo metropolitan area, comprising:
  - Haneda International Airport (HND)
  - Narita International Airport (NRT)
- Port of Tokyo, by seaport code
- Tokyo Station, by JR East station code
- TY.O, an album by Taio Cruz
- Tokyo Stock Exchange
- Tamil Youth Organisation
- TYO Animations
