= Daniel Hewitt =

British journalist

Daniel Hewitt is a British journalist and author currently working for ITV News as Investigations Editor. He was also political correspondent for ITV News.

== Early life ==
Hewitt grew up in Cannock in Staffordshire and attended Chasetown High School. He studied Politics at the University of York before training as a journalist at Cardiff University's school of journalism.

== Career ==
Hewitt joined ITV News Central in 2011. In 2012 he was named Midlands Newcomer of the Year, before moving to ITV Granada as a Sports Reporter. In 2013 he became Granada Reports's Political Correspondent, and later that year he was named North West TV Journalist of the Year at the O2 Media Awards.

In 2018, Hewitt was named the Royal Television Society North West Journalist of the Year. He has also been nominated for two Royal Television Society awards for his coverage of the Khuram Shaikh murder and his coverage of the 2015 General Election respectively. In 2018 his investigation into child poverty in the North of England was nominated for The Orwell Prize.

In 2018 he left to join ITV Network News.

He presented Calling Peston: the ITV News Politics Podcast, which has been twice nominated for Podcast of the Year, and US Election podcast ‘Will Trump Win?’ with ITV News’ Washington Correspondent Robert Moore, which was named 2021 Podcast of the Year at The Drum Online Media Awards.

In 2022 and again in 2024, Hewitt was named Royal Television Society Specialist Journalist of the Year. His Documentary ‘Surviving Squalor: Britain’s Housing Shame’ won Best Documentary at the Association of International Broadcasters awards. His work investigating housing and homelessness has earned him a string of award wins and nominations.

He also was called to Parliament to give evidence to MPs on the findings of the investigation.

He presented the documentary podcast series The Trapped, which in 2025 was awarded an ARIA Radio Academy award for Best Factual Series and was awarded Silver at the British Podcast Awards for Best Documentary. It was also nominated for The Orwell Prize and an Amnesty International Award.

Hewitt published his first book, Left To Rot: How Governments Have Betrayed Us and How We Fix It, in 2026. He is represented by David Higham Associates.

Hewitt supports West Bromwich Albion.
