= Patrick Denipitiya =

- Birth name: Patrick Denipitiya
- Born: 11 August 1934; Kotahena, Sri Lanka
- Origin: Sri Lanka
- Died: 23 March 2013 (aged 78); Brampton, Ontario, Canada
- Occupation(s): Songwriter, composer, music director, Arranger, instrumentalist
- Instrument(s): Hawaiian (lap slide) guitar, piano, harmonium, acoustic guitar, electronic keyboard
- Formerly of: The Patrick Denipitiya Combo, C T Fernando

Patrick Tibertius Maximus Denipitiya (11 August 1934—23 March 2013) was a Sri Lankan musician.

He was part of the movement that brought western music to Sri Lanka in the 1960s, he also introduced the electric Hawaiian guitar into Sri Lankan sinhala music industry and was responsible for the musical composition, arrangements, music direction and performance of many Sinhala songs and films from the early-1950s to 1997.

He had a unique ability whereby he could write music scores without using an instrument in both Eastern and Western notation. He was able to do this for an entire orchestra that utilized both eastern and western instruments. He directed music for a lot of songs written by Karunaratne Abeysekera, George Leslie Ranasinghe and Cyril A Seelawimala (and some of Premakeerthi De Alwis, KDK Darmawardene, Fr. Mercelyn Jayakody, for example).

Patrick was the Music Director for many original songs sung by C.T. Fernando, Milton Mallawarachchi, C.D. Fonseka, Susil Premaratne, Anjalene Gunathileke (née Lanerole), Sydney Atygalle, Mallika Kahawita, Maurice Dahanayake, Christopher Paul, H R Jothipala, Kanthi Wakwella, Henry Caldera, Latha Walpola, Sujatha Attanayake, Indrani Perera, Rupa Indhumathie, M.S. Fernando, Irene de Alwis, Camilus Anton Peiris, Freddie Silva, Ivor Dennis (and others) and for many calypso groups such as The J brothers, Samanalayo, Grain Leornados etc.

He directed music in the movies "Senghawunu Menika" in 1967, "Senakeliya" a box office hit in 1974 and "Loka Horu" 1976. He has co-directed movies including "Saudan Jema", "Akke mata Awasara" and has directed, performed and assisted in many ways in over 5000 commercial songs and movie song recordings.

== Early life and career ==
Patrick Denipitiya was born into a family with ten children in Kotahena. His parents were Coronalis Denipitiya, a railway stationmaster and Mary Simona (née Fernando). His siblings were named Sunny, Benedict, Paul, Andrew, Anne, Edward, Anton, Bertram, and Milton. Denipitiya studied at St Benedict's College, Colombo and finally at St. Aloysius' College (Galle). He had his first music lessons from Sunil Santha who continued to give him free lessons and featured him in his recordings.

He was the music composer in Sinhala films such as 'Senakeliya', 'Sangawuna Menika', 'Loka Horu' and also co-directed the film music in 'Saudan Jema' and a few other films with P.L.A. Somapala. He has contributed his talent to many other film recordings of other music directors such as Muththusamy (he first started to write music scores for Muththusamy's 'Prema Tharange' song 'Chandraya Paayala – Latha Walpola'), P.L.A Somapala, M.K. Rocksamy, T.K.Latiff, Galagedara M Haq, Mohommed Sally, Sarath Balasooriya, Many Indian music directors such as T.R. Papa and other compatriates, assisting them with his knowledge and ability to play many instruments. Rocksamy, Patrick and Latif were the three Tamil, Sinhala and Muslim icons and genius friends who regularly appeared and assisted in most of the film background music and song recordings for nearly thirty years.

He composed the first Sinhala group song 'Udarata Menike Manahara Kandurata Thilake' by C.D. Fonseka, Razeena Yakim, Angeline Goonethileke and Shelton Mendis as well as many other popular songs including 'Aatha Kandurali Simba Simba', 'Pulun Wage Sudu Raula Digai 1958', 'Vishnu Devinde' and 'Umayanganiyo Surralaliniyo' by Jothi, 'Nelum Male Pethi Kadala' by M.S. Fernando, Angeline Goonethilleke and Nimala Atapattu, 'Hithe Ekak Thiyan' by Angeline Goonetilleke, 'Iwuru Thala', 'Ma Nisa Oba', 'Sayuru Theredi', 'Rayak Upadda' and 'Ma Ha Eda' by Milton Mallawarachchi (as music composer) and 'Shreeni Vibushitha Lanka Babale' by Latha Walpola. Many of C.T. Fernando's songs such as 'Sihina Lowe', 'Hela Jathika Abhimane', 'Aane Dingak Innako', 'Maa Baala Kaale', 'Sandawata Rantharu', 'Mal Loke Rani' and 'Punsanda Hinahenne', among others, became hits under his unique music direction and arrangements.

Denipitiya was the music director for many individual artist shows such as 'Baig Geethika' by Mohideen Baig, C.T. Fernando's 'Wana Bamabru', 'Rukmani Handa' by Rukmani Devi and Helen Daniels, P.L.A. & Chithra Somapala's 'Ranwan Gee' and 'Sundar Geeth' Hindi by Tudor Jayashantha. In addition to playing, he had also sung in some recordings of songs such as 'Sihina Lowe' with C.T. Fernando (original SLBC recording), 'Ganga Yamuna Hawuna' with Mallika Kahawita and 'Ho Mata Ethi Sampatha' with Christoper Paul.

He was the first to introduce the electric lap slide guitar to Sri Lanka's Sinhala Music industry while also being a pioneer in introducing pop music to the Sri Lankan oriental music industry in the early 1960s. He worked in harmony with all orchestras of Sri Lanka including the Radio Ceylon Orchestra for many decades.

Patrick Denipitiya toured Europe with C.T. Fernando in 1969 (as the first Sri Lankan music director to travel to Europe on tour) and had a meeting with the internationally famous George Harrison of the Beatles, impressing him with his musical knowledge. He also toured Canada and the United States with H.R. Jothipala. Denipitiya has also visited cities such as: London, UK; Zürich, Switzerland and Paris, France with Chitra Somapala and P.L.A. Somapala and with M.S. Fernando to many other countries.

He formed his own band 'Patrick Denipitiya Combo in the 60s in addition to being the Band Leader for the original SIAC, the band had performed at Sweep Ticket Lottery shows, 'Maliban Guwan Totilla', the 'Elasto Show', the Kandy Lake Club, Sugathadasa Indoor Stadium shows, Akase Kade and Tropicana Club to name a few. He also performed on many Television programmes, being the first musician to appear on BBC Sandeshaya Programme with CT. Later on with the advent of TV in Sri Lanka, the Denipitiya Combo frequently appeared in TV shows like ITN's 'Madhu Rasangha', ITN's 'Ambhals Ghee dham Mala' (which was the first amateur song contest on Sri Lankan television), Rupavahini Anniversary and 'Musically Yours', although there are other television programmes on which the Combo has appeared.

== Personal life ==
In 1961, Patrick married Celcie Fernando, with whom he had three children: Primus; Mahesh Denipitiya and Shyami. Shyami currently resides in Canada and is married to Greg Jayasundera who is an Applications Consultant at a leading bank in Canada. Primus is employed as a senior airport services officer in a leading airline and was one of the pioneers of the one-man show industry in Sri Lanka in the early 1980s.

Though he was involved in his music, Patrick also worked to support his family, being employed at the Census Department in the early Fifties, then at Lake House and subsequently to Lake House bookshop lately. He also took up teaching, teaching music theory, guitar (Hawaiian and Spanish), piano and keyboard to many students purely for his love for music and sharing knowledge and not for economic gain. He was fondly remembered by eminent people like Pandith Ameradeva, former SLBC chairman Late Mr Eamon Kariyakaravana for giving their children music lessons free of charge and also to many other students until his 1990 migration to Canada. He continued to teach, and was actively involved in music while living in Canada. He directed music for the first ever Sri Lankan teledrama in Canada "Ratakin ratakata" and also performed at events and functions, for concerts of Sri Lankan artists touring Canada.

=== Stroke and death ===
While in Sri Lanka attending his elder son's wedding in 1997, he suffered a stroke and was partially paralysed and was then taken back to Canada. Partick was lucky enough to have his wife Celcie who looked after him during the 16-year period between his stroke and his death.

He died on 23 March 2013 in Brampton, Ontario, Canada.

== See also ==
- Music of Sri Lanka
- H.R. Jothipala
