= Kalmunai North Hospital =

- Ministry of Health, Sri Lanka

Geography
- Location: Kalmunai, Ampara District, Eastern Province, Sri Lanka
- Coordinates: 7°25′11.70″N 81°49′22.20″E

Organisation
- Care system: Public

Services
- Beds: 413

Links
- Website: www.bhkalmunai-north.health.gov.lk
- Lists: Hospitals in Sri Lanka

Kalmunai North Hospital is a government hospital in Kalmunai, Sri Lanka. It is controlled by the central government in Colombo. As of 2010 it had 413 beds. The hospital is sometimes called Kalmunai North Base Hospital.
