= Jeyakumari Balendran =

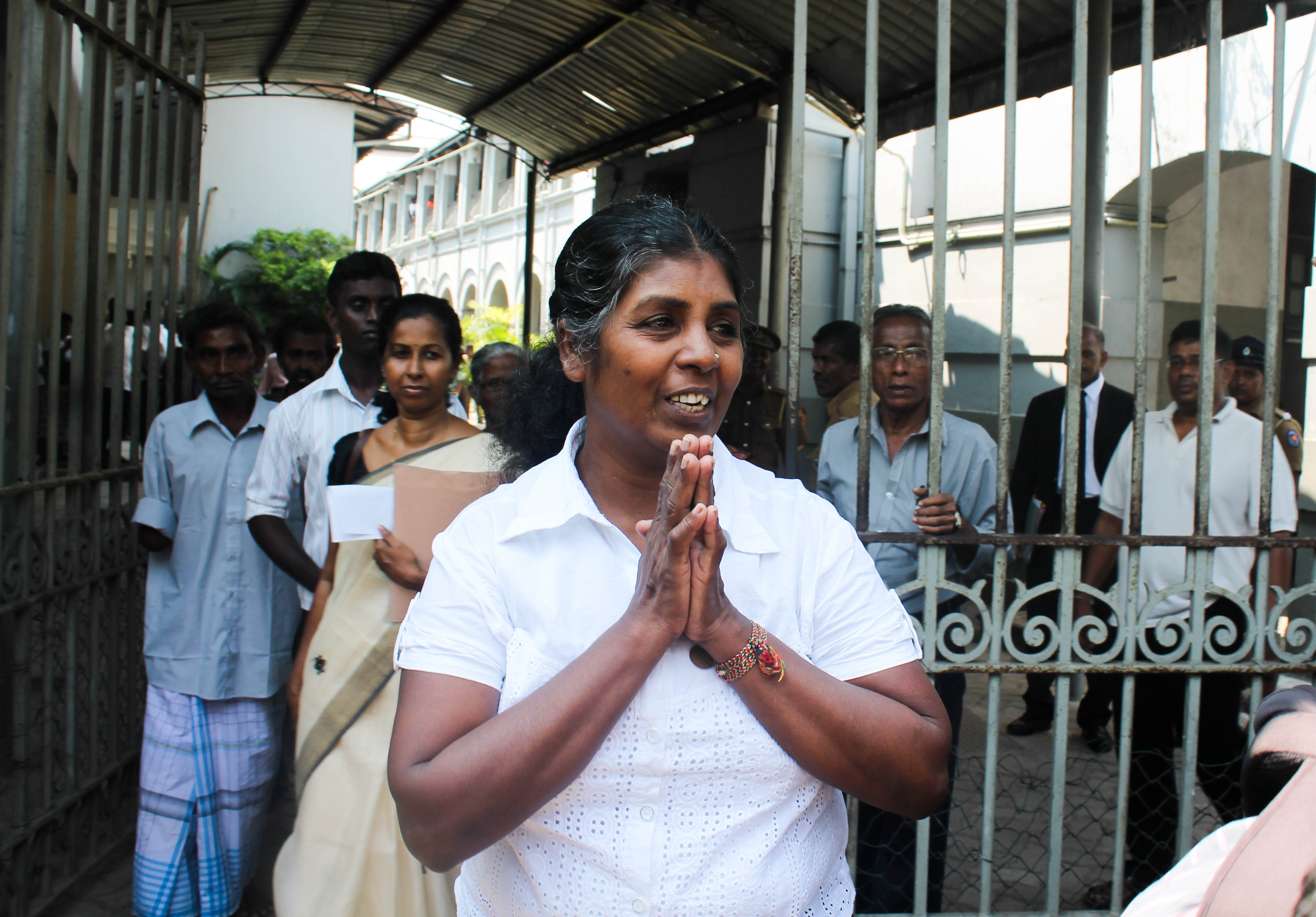
Jeyakumari Balendran

Jeyakumari Balendran is a Sri Lankan Tamil woman and an activist campaigning for the families of those who disappeared while in Sri Lankan military custody. Sri Lankan government forces currently have Ms Jeyakumari and her 13-year-old daughter Vipoosika in detention at an unknown location. They gained prominence during British Prime Minister David Cameron’s visit to Jaffna in November, when Vipoosika’s desperate pleas for the return of her missing brother gained widespread coverage. Civil society campaigners have expressed concern for the safety of mother and daughter.

== Protests against the Government of Sri Lanka ==
=== Forced disappearance of son ===
Jeyakumari's youngest son was conscripted into the LTTE prior to the final stages of the Sri Lankan Civil War that was being waged in the Northern and Eastern parts of the country. Having survived the war and rejoined his family, the boy was asked to surrender to the Sri Lanka Armed Forces. Jeyakumari heeded the call of the authorities and surrendered her son, who was 15 years old at the time. He vanished while in the custody of the Lankan state, after he was photographed being ‘rehabilitated’.

Since then Jeyakumari has been engaged in a peaceful struggle to discover the whereabouts not only of her son, but also of thousands of others who 'disappeared' while in the Sri Lankan military's custody. She emerged as one of the leading human rights activists in the Northern Province among thousands of widows and children who lost their husbands, fathers and loved ones during the conflict. She and Vipoosika have been prominent in campaigns to establish the whereabouts of missing people.

=== Demonstrations in 2013 ===
Jeyakumari led the demonstration that greeted British Prime Minister David Cameron when he visited Jaffna in November 2013. She and Vipoosika were at the forefront of a weeping crowd that held up photographs of their missing relatives.

== Arrest ==
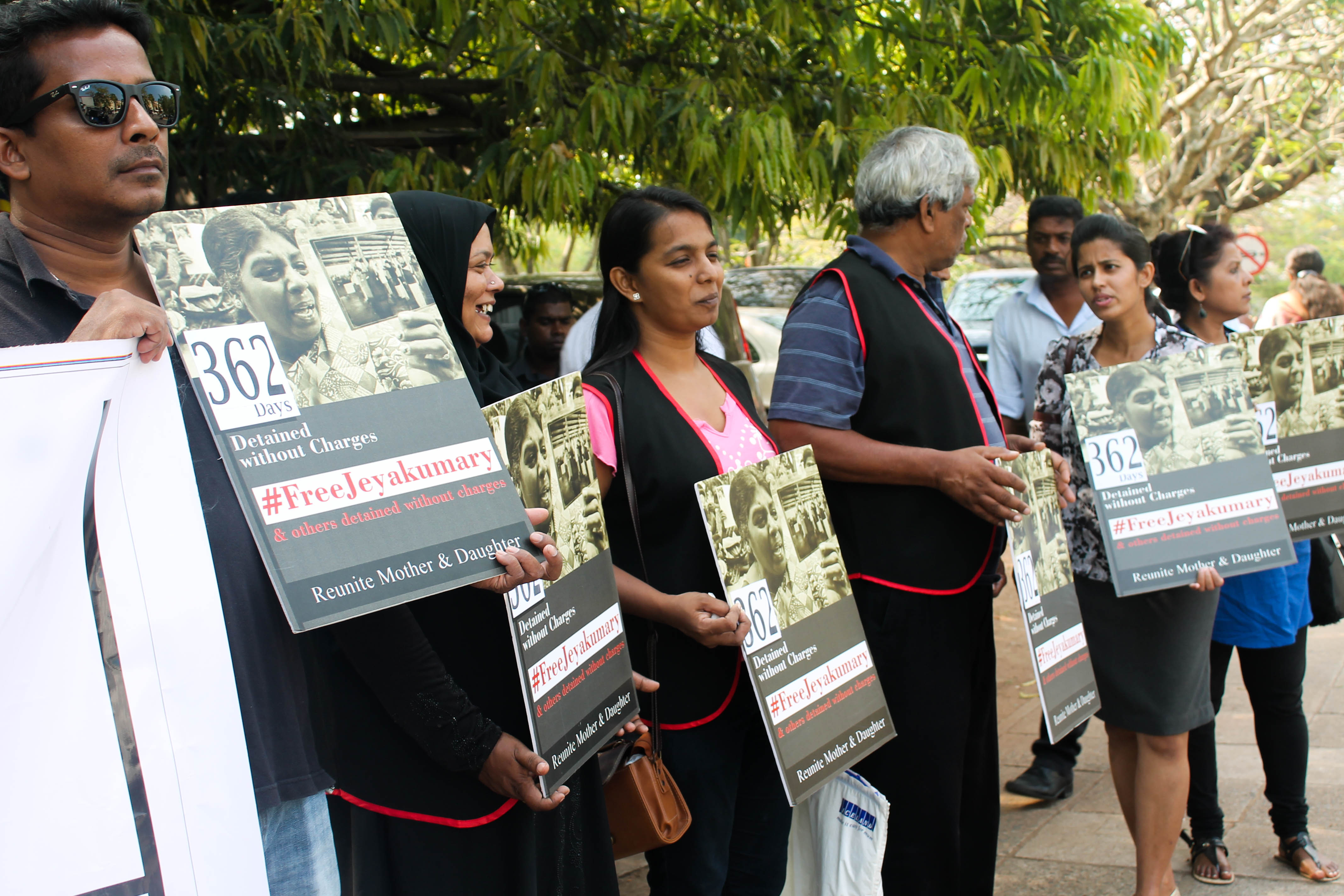
Demonstrators holding placards supporting Jeyakumari's release

Jeyakumari and Vipoosika were arrested in March 2014 on alleged charges that they were harboring a suspected criminal who had shot and wounded a policeman. Hundreds of troops surrounded the area while the arrest took place. The Sri Lankan Police later announced that both had been detained by officers attached to the Terrorist Investigation Division (TID). When one of her friends tried to contact her by phone, the military personnel terminated the call and the phone was switched off. TNPF leader, Gajendrakumar Ponnambalam, who was able to speak briefly to Ms Jeyakumari soon after the raid began, said she was being threatened for taking part in protests by families of those who had disappeared.

Jeyakumari is still being detained without any charge. She fears for her life because she possesses tangible evidence against the Sri Lankan Armed Forces for rights violations, especially in relation to the disappearance of her husband, the killing of her two sons and the disappearance of the third. She has a strong case against the government because it published a photograph of her son in a government book depicting rehabilitation of rebel fighters. Furthermore, the Sri Lankan state has also detained Ruki Fernando and Father Praveen Mahesan, human right defenders in the north, who were documenting her arrest and trying to assist her.

International organisations such as the Asian Federation Against Involuntary Disappearances (AFAID) and Asian Human Rights Commission(AHRC) have expressed shock and concern over Jeyakumari's arbitrary detention and believe that her life is in danger. Prior to the arrests of Fernando and Jeyakumari, several other human rights defenders and critics of the authoritarian Rajapaksa-led government were intimidated, harassed, and have disappeared.
