= Kotakethana murders =

Series of murders in Sri Lanka

Details
- Victims: 18
- Span of crimes: 2008–2015
- State: Sri Lanka

Kotakethana murders refer to a series of 18 mysterious murders of women, including three double murders, starting from 2008 in and around Kahawatte, Kotakethana, Dambulwala, Warapitiya, Opathawatte and nearby area in the Rathnapura district of Sri Lanka. The latest murder was reported on 28 September 2015 in Opathawatte in Kotakethana where a Tamil tea plantation worker woman was brutally hacked to death. The youngest victim was 19 years old and the eldest being 85. One 35-year-old male suspect was arrested on 11 December 2015 and his DNA matched with six murders.

== Murders ==
No	Date	Description	Victims
1	21/7/2008	The first case is 56-year-old Sellaiyah Mariamma, a resident of Opawatta in Kotakethana, who was murdered. She was reported to be mentally unsound and was raped before being strangled to death. One suspect was arrested, and he is held in the remand prison as of now. The case is postponed seeking the Attorney General's advice till 2/11/2015.	1
2	19/11/2008	A 52-year-old female in Kotakethana, Kahawatta was murdered. Four suspects were arrested and later, following the Attorney General's advice, the suspects were released on 06/7/2011 because of lack of evidence.	1
3	4/6/2010	A 48-year-old female in Kotakethana, Kahawatta was murdered. One suspect was arrested and is currently held in the remand prison. The case will be heard again on 02/11/2015.	1
4	21/12/2010	An 80-year-old female called Heenmenika, a resident of Dimbulwela, Kahawatta, was murdered. A suspect confessed to the murder of Heenmenika and two other previous murders. One suspect was arrested, and the case is due to be heard again on 02/11/2015.	1
5	3/4/2011	A 66-year-old female called Karunawathi was murdered in Kahawatta. One suspect was arrested on 7/7/2011, and he is being held in the remand prison. The case is postponed till 17/11/2015 seeking the Attorney General's advice.	1
6	30/5/2011	An 85-year-old female called Disanayake Mudhiyanselage Heenmenike, a resident of Nugawela, Kahawatta, was murdered. One suspect was arrested and was later released on bail. The case is postponed to 23/11/2015 seeking the Attorney General's advice.	1
7	18/6/2011	A 56-year-old female called Jayanthi Menike, a resident of Dimbulwela, Kahawatta, was murdered. One suspect was arrested and is currently held in the remand prison. The case is due to be heard again on 23/11/2015.	1
8	15/12/2011	A 69-year-old female called Bandara Menike, a resident of Opathapara, Kotakethana, Kahawatta, was murdered. One suspect was arrested and is currently held in the remand prison. The case has been directed to the High Court to be heard on the 23/11/2015.	1
9	31/1/2012	A double murder took place in Pansala Para, Kotakethana, Kahawatta. A 19-year-old female called Kavindya Chathurani and her mother 52-year-old female called Nayana Nilmini were murdered. Around 400 Police and STF personnel were deployed after the incident and protests broke out by angry people. Four suspects including one female suspect were arrested. However, one suspect was later released on bail following which he went missing. Another suspect has been acquitted by the Attorney General. The case is ongoing in the Colombo High Court.	2
10	30/5/2012	Another double murder took place in Warapitiya, Pansalapara, Kahawata. A 61-year-old female called Dayawathi and a 53-year-old female called Thilakawathi were burnt to death inside their house. They were sisters. After the incident police set up a 10-man police post to address public fear. One suspect was arrested and was later released on bail. The suspect later committed suicide. The case has been postponed since the accused was dead.	2
11	19/7/2012	Another double murder took place in Kotakethana, Kahawatta. A 63-year-old female called Premawathi and her daughter 32-year-old H.D Pushpakumari were murdered and their house set on fire. Three suspects were arrested and later on 28/5/2015, all the suspects were acquitted following a High Court order.	2
12	31/10/2012	A 66-year-old female called Chandrawathi, a resident of Warapitiya in Kahawatta, was murdered. No suspect has been found. The police have presented the fact sheet to the court and the investigations are still underway.	1
13	21/10/2014	A 31-year-old female called J. Thilakarani, a resident of Opathawatta, Kotakethana, was murdered and her body was found floating in the river. Two suspects were arrested, and they are currently held in the remand prison. The case was to be heard on 5/10/2015.	1
14	4/4/2015	A 39-year-old female called Swaranalatha, a resident of Kotakethana, was murdered. Suspects were arrested and are currently held in the remand prison. The case was due to be heard on 5/10/2015.	1
15	28/9/2015	A 48-year-old female called Nadan Paappu, a resident of Opathawatte in Kotakethana, was murdered while she was working in the tea estate. No suspect has been arrested. The Police Special Task Force troops were deployed following the incident amid fear by the people in the area. The police had presented a fact sheet to the court and the investigation is still underway. On 11 December 2015 a 35-year-old man who is also a resident of the area was arrested after three months of investigation by the CID.	1

== Similarities ==
All these killings have similarities which constitute several elements of systematic and extrajudicial killings.

1. The killings were of only women
2. 13 out of the 18 women were over 60 years old
3. All the killings were centered in a particular same area.
4. Killings were conducted while the women were isolated or lived alone in their houses
5. Many of the women were raped before they were killed
6. Many of the women were first killed then their dead bodies were burnt along with their houses.
7. In several killings, the bodies of the women were taken some distance away from their houses.
8. Many of the killings showed clear evidence that the killings have been carried out by either two or more culprits.

== Investigations and arrests ==
The police believe that all the murders may not be connected.

On 11 December 2015, a 35-year-old suspect was arrested by police after several months of investigation by the CID. He is a resident of the same area. On 15 December 2015, the CID informed the Pelmadulla Magistrate that the DNA samples of the suspect matches DNA samples collected from the scenes of six of the seven murders in Kotakethana and Kahawatta.

== See also ==
- List of fugitives from justice who disappeared
