= Tamil Youth Organisation =

The Tamil Youth Organization (TYO) is an international organization with branches in the UK, Canada, Australia, France, Norway and several other nations. They organize cultural, sports events and also follows a Tamil nationalist approach and helped organize a referendum among the Tamil diaspora and support an independent Tamil Eelam.

The Tamil Youth Organization has been designated as a terrorist organisation by the Sri Lankan government. This claim is rather questionable, however, as it only supported Tamil Eelam, but did not involve in activities to fund or defend it, and merely organizes cultural events.
