= Ashraff Memorial Hospital =

Hospital in Kalmunai, Eastern, Sri Lanka

- Ministry of Health, Sri Lanka
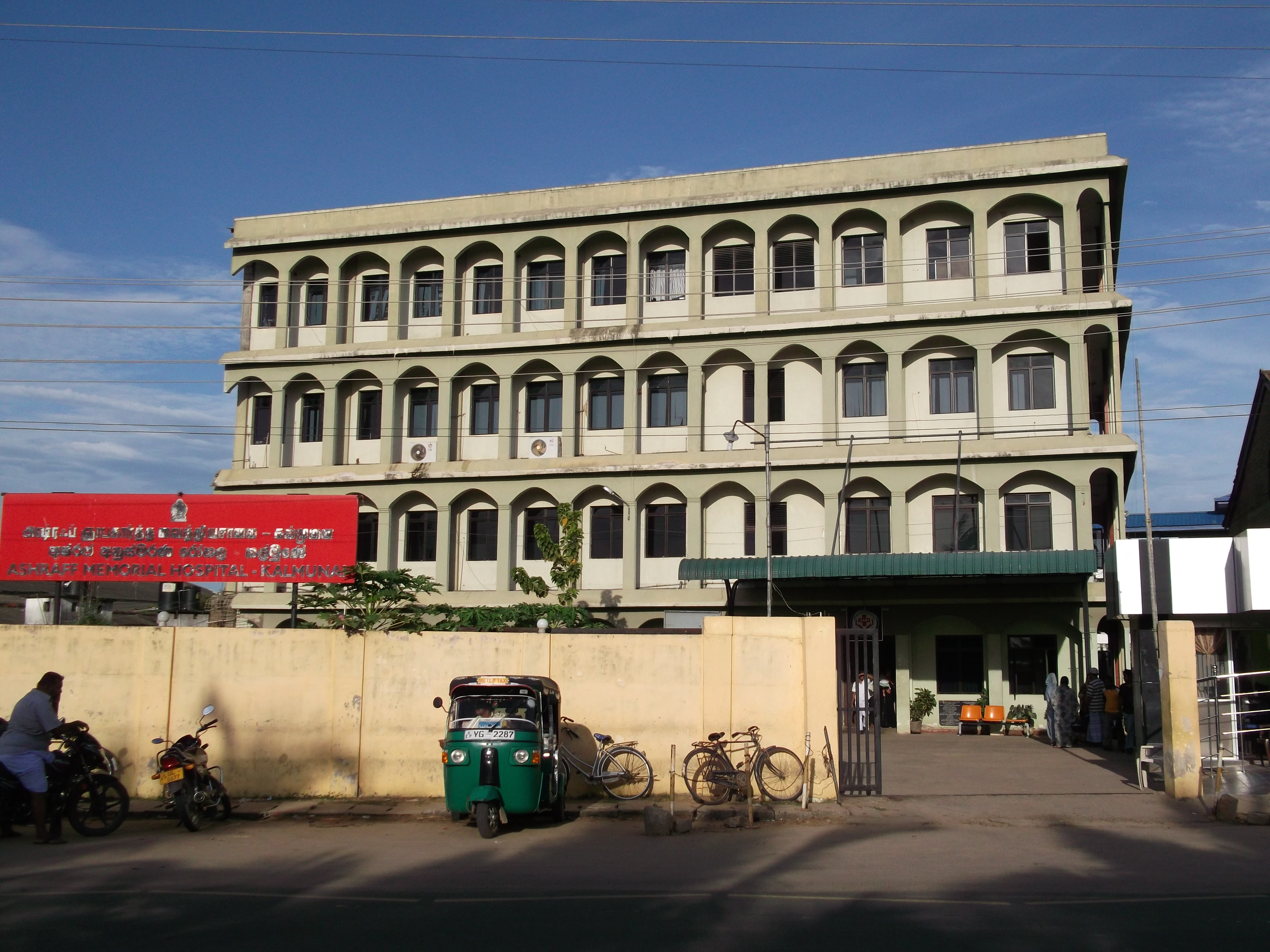

Geography
- Location: Main Street, Kalmunai, Ampara District, Eastern Province, Sri Lanka
- Coordinates: 7°24′12.70″N 81°49′51.80″E

Organisation
- Care system: Public

Services
- Emergency department: Yes
- Beds: 310

Links
- Website: amhkalmunai.org
- Lists: Hospitals in Sri Lanka

Ashraff Memorial Hospital is a government hospital in Kalmunai, Sri Lanka. It is controlled by the central government in Colombo. As of 2010 it had 310 beds. The hospital is sometimes called Kalmunai South Base Hospital or Kalmunai South Hospital.

== History ==
Kalmunakudi Central Dispensary was founded in the 1940s. The dispensary was relocated to Kalmunai in 1988 and converted into a Central Dispensary and a Maternity Home. The hospital was upgraded to a Peripheral Unit in 1995, District Hospital in 1996 and Base Hospital in 1999. Kalmunai South Base Hospital was renamed Ashraff Memorial Hospital in 2002 in memory of M. H. M. Ashraff, a leading politician from the area. In 2002 the hospital was taken over by the central government in Colombo - it had previously been controlled by the provincial government in Trincomalee.
