= Trincomalee Hospital =

- Ministry of Health, Eastern Province
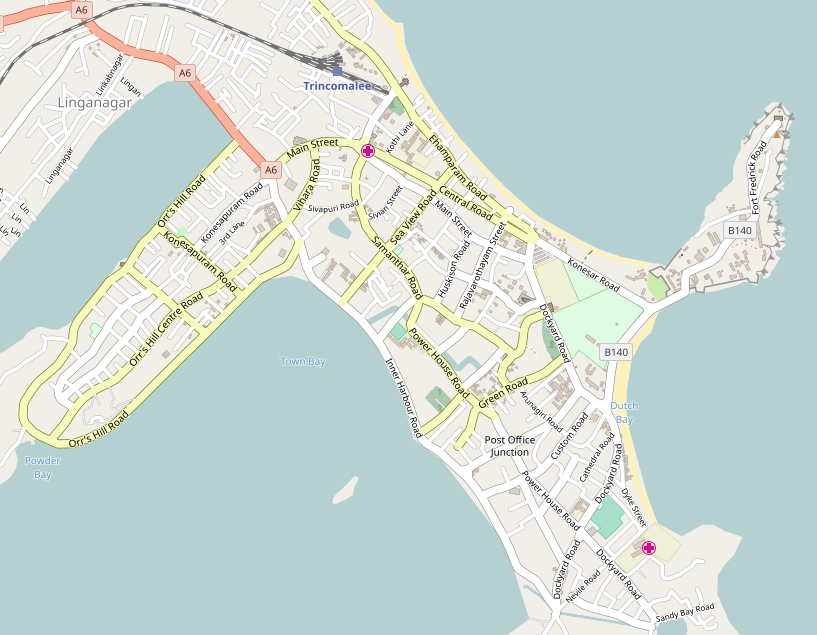
- Location in central Trincomalee

Geography
- Location: Trincomalee, Trincomalee District, Eastern Province, Sri Lanka
- Coordinates: 8°33′51.40″N 81°14′21.70″E

Organisation
- Care system: Public

Services
- Beds: 379

Links
- Lists: Hospitals in Sri Lanka

Trincomalee Hospital is a government hospital in Trincomalee, Sri Lanka. It is the leading hospital in Trincomalee District and is controlled by the provincial government in Trincomalee. As of 2010 it had 379 beds. The hospital is sometimes called Trincomalee General Hospital or Trincomalee District General Hospital.

In December 2021, due to lack on space on the current site, the Ministry of Health initiated discussions to construct a new hospital outside the city of Trincomalee but in a location close to the city.
