= S. M. Chandrasena =

Sri Lankan politician (born 1955)

Hon. S. M. Chandrasena MP
- සමරකෝන් මුදියන්සේලාගේ චන්ද්‍රසේන சமரகோன் முடியன்சேலாகே சந்திரசேனா

Minister of Agriculture
- In office 2004–2007

Non-Cabinet Minister of Nation Building
- In office 2007–2010

Deputy Minister of Irrigation & Water Resources Management
- In office 2010 – 12 January 2015

Member of Parliament for Anuradhapura District
- In office 2001–2024

Personal details
- Born: 3 May 1955 (age 70)
- Party: Sri Lanka Freedom Party
- Other political affiliations: United People's Freedom Alliance
- Occupation: Agriculturist

Samarakoon Mudiyanselage Chandrasena (born 3 May 1955) is a Sri Lankan politician, a member of the Parliament of Sri Lanka and a government minister. He has one child. His brother is former chief minister of North Central province, S. M. Ranjith. He is a famous politician in Anuradhapura District.

== Controversies ==
On 4 July 2025, Chandrasena was arrested by the Commission to Investigate Allegations of Bribery or Corruption (CIABOC) in connection with an allegation of misappropriating Rs. 25 million worth of maize seeds during the run-up to the 2015 Sri Lankan presidential election.
