= Khuram Shaikh murder =

Mirder of Khuram Shaikh and gang rape of his girlfriend

On the Christmas Day 2011 a Briton, Khuram Shaikh Zaman was murdered and his Russian girlfriend gang raped in a resort in Tangalle, Sri Lanka.

== Background ==
Khuram Shaikh Zaman, age 32, was a Red Cross worker from Milnrow, in Greater Manchester. He had been fitting prosthetic limbs in Gaza in the previous months and was on holiday in Sri Lanka with his 23 year old Russian girlfriend, Victoria Alexandrovna, intending to spend Christmas and New Year in the island. They were staying at a resort in Tangalle, which was owned by Sampath Chandra Pushpa Vidanapathirana, a local council leader and political ally of the then president Mahinda Rajapakse.

== Events ==
As Christmas Day dawned there were about 60 people on the resort's dance floor, both locals and foreigners. Both Shaikh and his girlfriend were there when a brawl erupted between a group of men. After Shaikh got involved to help a man being assaulted, about six to eight men led by Sampath Vidanapathirana assaulted and killed Khuram Shaikh and sexually assaulted his girlfriend who was found on the beach with her clothes torn apart and with bruises on her body. She was admitted to the Matara hospital from which she was transferred to the Karapitiya hospital.

== Trial and conviction ==
The trial of the suspects was delayed for over two years amid allegations of interference because of Sampath Vidanapathirana's political connections. But under intense diplomatic pressure by the UK government the trial eventually went ahead. Sampath Vidanapathirana was jailed for 20 years for culpable homicide not amounting to murder, along with three other men, in July 2014, almost two years after the crime; two other men were acquitted.

Lahiru Kelum, U. Sama Deshapriya and Praneeth Chathuranga who were convicted of Mr Shaikh's killing with the former council leader were all also found guilty of raping a woman.

== Aftermath ==
In response to the court decision, a statement from the British High Commission in Colombo stated: "We hope that this will bring some closure for his family and friends who have faced a long and difficult fight for justice.

They further added: "We will continue to monitor any developments in the case closely."

This incident and many such incidents were highlighted by the opposition to showcase the widespread lawlessness in the country fueled by political meddling with the judiciary. This led to the ultimate defeat of president Mahinda Rajapakse in the presidential election 2015.
