= Karunarathna Divulgane =

Sri Lankan musician and politician

Hon. Karunarathna Divulgane
- කරුණාරත්න දිවුල්ගනේ கருணாரத்னா திவுல்கனே
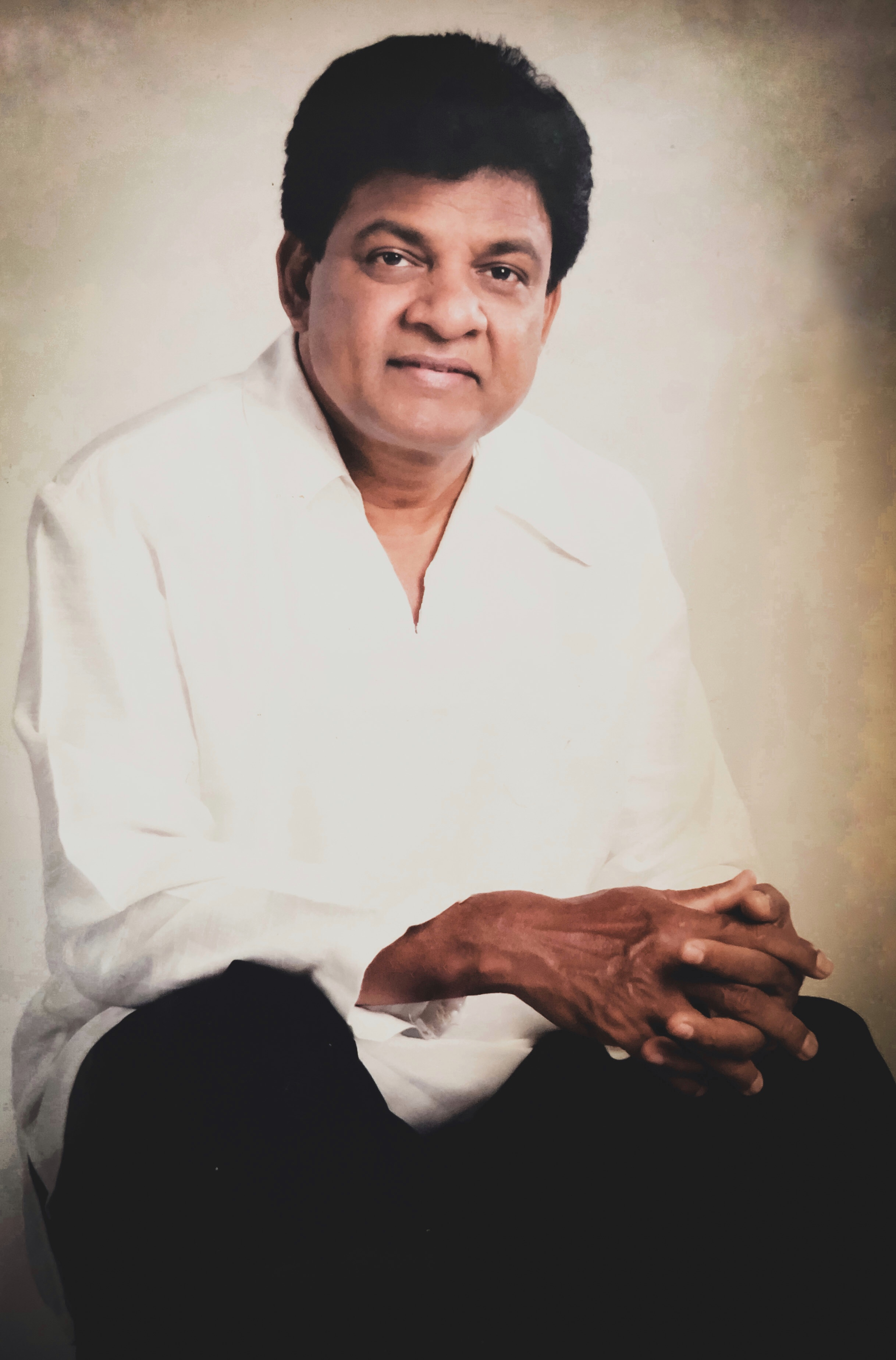
- Divulgane in 2019

7th Governor of North Central Province
- In office 13 November 2006 – 27 January 2015
- President: Mahinda Rajapaksa
- Chief Minister: Berty Premalal Dissanayake; S. M. Ranjith
- Preceded by: Jagath Balasuriya
- Succeeded by: P. B. Dissanayake

Karunarathna Divulgane (born Herath Mudiyanselage Karunarathna) is a popular and renowned Sri Lankan vocalist, and served as the governor of the North Central Province between 2006 and 2015.

He was born to a farming family who had been living for generations in Divulgane, a small village in the Kurunegala District.

In 1980 he was hired by the Rajarata Sevaya radio station. In 1982 he had passed an examination at the radio station and selected as a singer in the "Rajarata Sevaya". It was around this time that he took the name "Divulgane".

In 1990 he released his first album Esata Asuwana Maime, was success and quickly became one of the most sought artist in the country.

Esata Asuwana Maime was followed by a second album, Nethata Ulelak (A Festival for the Eyes) around 1994. His third album, Nil Diyawara (Blue Waters) was released in 1998 followed by Sanhinda Pamula in 2001. He has since released two further albums Tharu Eliya Dige and May Sihina Hari Pudumai.

Divulgane served as the 7th Governor of the North Central Province of Sri Lanka between 13 November 2006 and 27 January 2015.

Political offices
Preceded by Jagath Balasuriya	Governor of North Central Province; 2006–2015	Succeeded by P. B. Dissanayake
