= Kumari Balasuriya =

Sri Lankan politician

Neranjala Pushpa Kumari Balasooriya known as Kumari Balasuriya was the governor of Southern Province. She was the first female governor of a Sri Lankan Province. She resigned from the post after fall of the Mahinda Rajapakse's government in 2015.

Political offices
Preceded by Kingsley Wickramaratne	Governor of Southern Province; 2006–2015	Succeeded by Hemakumara Nanayakkara
