= G. A. Chandrasiri =

Sri Lankan army general, politician

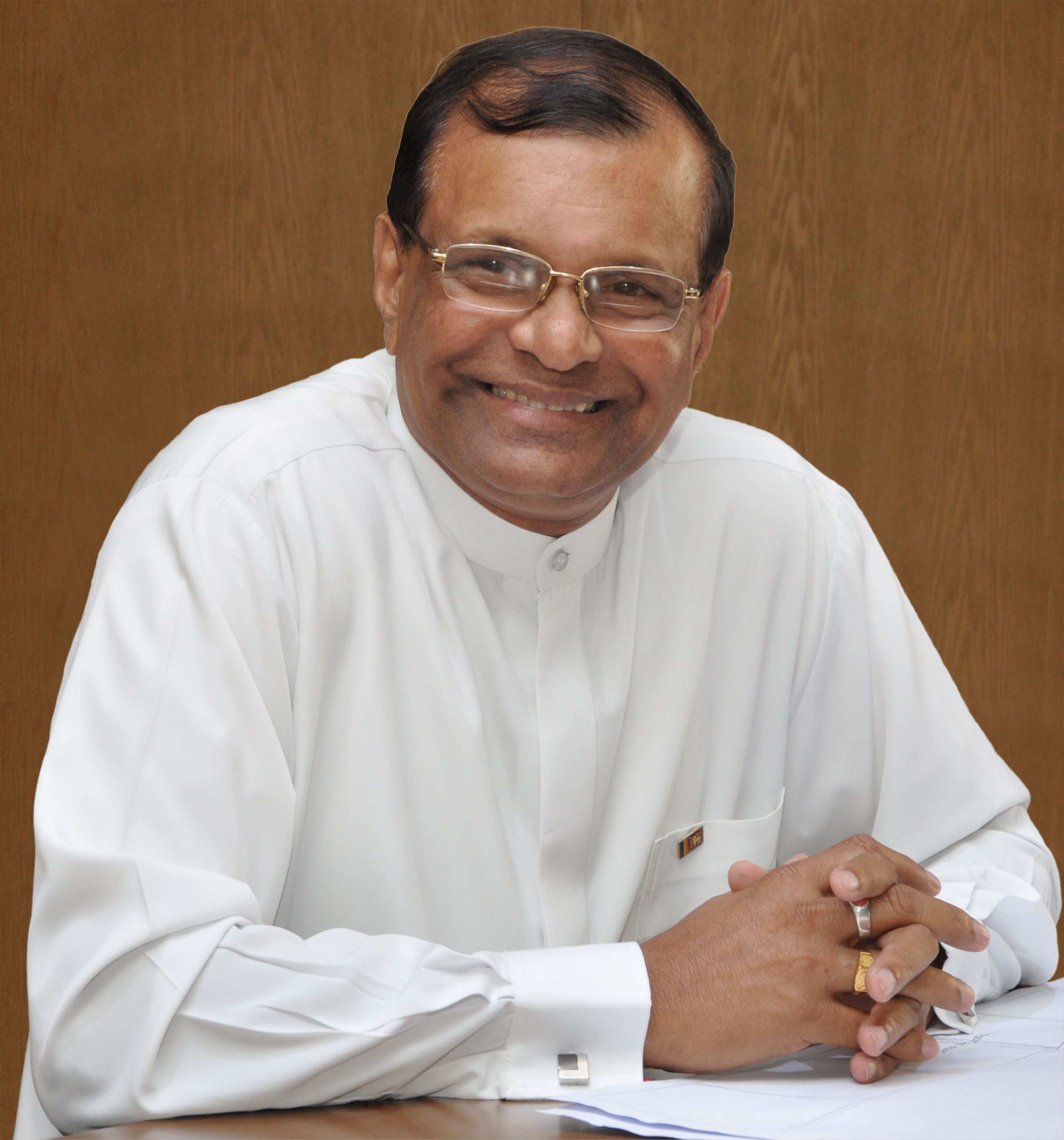
- Military career
- Branch: Sri Lanka Army
- Service years: 1974–2009
- Rank: Major General
- Unit: Sri Lanka Armoured Corps
- Commands: Commander Security Forces Headquarters - Jaffna, 52 Division, Armoured Brigade
- Conflicts: JVP Insurrection 1987-89, Sri Lankan Civil War
- Awards: Rana Wickrama Padakkama, Uttama Seva Padakkama
- Other work: Governor of Northern Province, Sri Lanka

Major General Gammanpila Arachchige Chandrasiri (known as G.A Chandrasiri), RWP, USP, ndc, psc, SLAC (born 1954) was a Sri Lankan senior army officer and a provincial governor. He is the Governor of Northern Province. He was the former Commander Security Forces Headquarters - Jaffna (SF HQ (J)); General Officer Commanding, 52 Division;, Director General - General Staff, Joint Operations Headquarters; Brigade Commander Armoured Brigade, and Commander, Area Headquarters Mannar.

Chandrasiri joined the army in 1974, after basic training he was commissioned in to the 1st Reconnaissance Regiment, Sri Lanka Armoured Corps in 1976 as a Second Lieutenant. After serving as a Troop Leader in the Ceylon Armoured Corps, he served as Officer Instructor, staff officer, adjutant, and squadron commander of the Sri Lanka Armoured Corps. Thereafter, he served as the Commandant, Armoured Corps Training Centre and following a stint as a staff officer in forward commands he became the Commanding officer the 4th Armoured Regiment, Sri Lanka Armoured Corps, before becoming the Centre Commandant, Regimental Centre, Sri Lanka Armoured Corps.

Promoted to the rank of Brigadier, he became the Brigade Commander, 531 Brigade; Director of Humanitarian Law, Army Headquarters; Military Security Coordinator, Presidential Security Unit. After becoming the Director of Armour, he became the Brigade Commander of the Independent Armoured Brigade. Thereafter, he became the Deputy General Officer Commanding, 21 Division; Commander, Area Headquarters Mannar; General Officer Commanding, 52 Division and Director General General Staff, Joint Operations Headquarters. In the final stages of the Sri Lankan Civil War he was appointed Commander Security Forces Headquarters - Jaffna, during which his command resisted several attacks on the Jaffna Peninsula by the LTTE until a successful offensive by his divisions pushed the LTTE out of the Jaffna peninsula and recaptured the strategic Elephant Pass. Following the end of the war, he was appointed by the President as Competitive Authority for approximately 3,000,000 internally displaced personnel and was in charge of the resettlement process.

General Chandrasiri is a graduate of the Defence Services Command And Staff College, Mirpur and National Defence College, India. He has received armoured warfare training in India, Fort Knox and attended the Senior Command Course in Mhow. He was awarded the Rana Wickrama Padakkama, Uttama Seva Padakkama (USP), the Sri Lanka Armed Services Long Service Medal, the Ceylon Armed Services Long Service Medal, the Purna Bhumi Padakkama, Vadamarachchi Operation Medal, and the Riviresa Campaign Services Medal.

In 2009, he retired from the army and was appointed Governor of the Northern Province and was reappointed in 2014.

== See also ==
- Northern Theatre of Eelam War IV

Political offices
| Preceded by Dickson Sarathchandra Dela | Governor of Northern Province; 2009–2015 | Succeeded by H. M. G. S. Palihakkara |
Military offices
| Preceded by | Commandant, Sri Lanka Army Volunteer Force | Succeeded by |
