= S. M. Ranjith =

Sri Lankan politician

Samarakoon Ranjith

5th Chief Minister of North Central Province
- In office 25 September 2012 – 28 January 2015
- Preceded by: Berty Premalal Dissanayake
- Succeeded by: Peshala Jayarathna

Personal details
- Born: Sri Lanka
- Party: Sri Lanka Freedom Party

Samarakoon Mudiyanselage Ranjith known as S. M. Ranjith is the fifth Chief Minister of the North Central Province of Sri Lanka. He belongs to the Sri Lanka Freedom Party and part of the United People's Freedom Alliance.
