= 2009 in Sri Lanka =

- Decades: 1980s; 1990s; 2000s; 2010s; 2020s
- See also: Other events of 2009; Timeline of Sri Lankan history

The following lists notable events that took place during 2009 in Sri Lanka. 2009 saw the conclusion of the Sri Lankan Civil War and the end of the nation's near 26-year long conflict with the separatist Liberation Tigers of Tamil Eelam.

== Incumbents ==
- President – Mahinda Rajapaksa
- Prime Minister – Ratnasiri Wickremanayake

=== Chief Ministers ===
- Central Province – Hon. Sarath Ekanayake
- Eastern Province – Hon. Sivanesathurai Chandrakanthan
- North Central Province – Berty Premalal Dissanayake
- Northern Province – Not elected
- North Western Province – Hon. Athula Wijesinghe
- Sabaragamuwa Province – Hon. Maheepala Herath
- Southern Province – Hon. Shan Wijayalal De Silv
- Uva Province – Hon. Gamini Wijith Wijayamuni
- Western Province –

=== Provincial Governors ===
- Central Province – Hon. Tikiri Kobbekaduwa
- Eastern Province – Rear Admiral Hon. Mohan Wijewickrama
- North Central Province – Hon. Karunarathne Diulgane
- Northern Province – Hon. Dixson Dela Bandara
- North Western Province – Hon. Tissa Balalla
- Sabaragamuwa Province – Hon. Mohan Ellawala
- Southern Province – Hon. Kumari Balasuriya
- Uva Province – Hon. Nanda Mathew
- Western Province – Hon. Alavi Moulana

== Events ==
- Sri Lankan Civil War
  - Eelam War IV
  - Protests against the Sri Lankan Civil War

== Events by month ==
=== January ===
- 1 January – The Paranthan LTTE garrison was captured by the Task Force 1 of the security forces of the Sri Lankan army.
- 2 January:
  - The army entered Kilinochchi, the "political capital" of rebel Tamil Tigers in the north, and book of fierce fighting in the city. Ground troops broke through the defense lines at the entrance to the town they besieged for months. The capture of the city does not sign the death of the Tigers, but is a bitter defeat after 36 years of separatist conflict – the longest ongoing war in Asia. The President of Sri Lanka Mahinda Rajapakse has ordered the rebel Tamil Tigers to lay down their arms and surrender.
  - Two Sri Lankan convicted of having shot dead a Sudanese accountant in Saudi Arabia, to steal the money he had on him as he left a bank, were decapitated at sword today in the region Riyadh.
  - A suicide attack in front of the air base Colombo, a member of the Tamil rebels, causes the death of two officers of the Air Force.
- 5 January – The army seized the southern passes of the Elephant, a very thin strip of land connects the island of Sri Lanka to Jaffna, killing several insurgents.
- 8 January – The Sri Lankan Army recaptures the village of Pallai from the Tamil Tigers in an effort to reach the Jaffna Peninsula.
- 9 January – The army managed to take full control of the pass of the Elephant, a strategic pass leading to the Jaffna in the north of the island. This peninsula, which was resumed in 1995 by the military government in Tamil Tigers, which took control of the Elephant pass in 2000, cutting off supplies to the rest of Sri Lanka.
- 22 January – The National Army takes command center of the Tamil Tiger rebels in the department of Mullaitivu, the latter still hands of the Liberation Tigers of Tamil Eelam (LTTE). The army now controls the entire peninsula Jaffna in the far north, after having seized a strategic move for the guerrilla held since 2000, the pass of the Elephant, linking Jaffna rest of the country.
- 25 January – The national army seized the port of Mullaitivu, the last town held by rebels of the separatist Tamil Tigers in the extreme north of the island. Dozens of civilians have been killed during fighting between government troops and separatist Tamil rebels. 27 civilians were killed and 76 others were injured in the bombings of two clinics in the area of Mullaitivu.
- 27 January – According to the BBC reports, at least 145 civilians were killed and 650 others were injured between 1 and January 25 in northern Sri Lanka during fighting between government troops and separatist Tamil rebels. But according to the website Tamil.net, which relays the positions of the Tigers, Sunday's bombings have killed over 300 people and injured hundreds more.
- 28 January – A convoy of about twenty vehicles leased by the International Committee of the Red Cross and the UN has been prevented by Tamil separatist rebels have access to a clinic Mullaitivu where they had to transfer some 300 civilians to a hospital in the government zone. According to the Sri Lankan newspaper Daily News: "The terrorists Tigers retain all these patients as hostages as human shields".
- 29 January – Medical teams of UN were finally evacuated from Mullaitivu "hundreds of people seriously injured, including 50 children.

=== February ===
- 1 February – At least nine people were killed in the bombing of a hospital in the area where the army is conducting a major offensive against the last strongholds of the separatist Tamil Tigers. According to the ICRC, is the second time in recent weeks that the clinic is concerned, recalling that "the wounded and sick, medical personnel and medical facilities are protected by international humanitarian law. They should in no circumstances be subject to direct attacks.
- 3 February:
  - The Department of Defense announced the capture of the bunker Tamil Tiger leader, hidden in a coconut plantation in the department of Mullaitivu in the context of his final assault against a last square of separatist rebels. The fighting for control of the bunker would have been 20 deaths in the ranks of the Tigers, however, the "Tigre No. 1, Velupillai Prabhakaran, was not in the underground infrastructure equipped with generators of air conditioning systems and medical facilities. A fierce battle is continuing in a triangle of 300 km2 still in the hands of separatists.
  - To mark the 61st anniversary of independence, President Mahinda Rajapakse, promises a total military victory against the rebel Liberation Tigers of Tamil Eelam (LTTE) ensuring that the offensive by army against the last Tamil rebel strongholds in the north of the island will be successful.
  - In the evening, at least 52 civilians were killed in the bombing of Suranthapuram, according to a United Nations observer.
- 4 February:
  - Amnesty International denounces the use of cluster munitions by the Sri Lankan army against civilians in the conflict between the separatist Tamil rebels; "These bombs are inherently victims blind because of the vast area covered by the many munitions released and the danger it poses to everyone, including civilians, who come into contact with them." The Sri Lankan army denies possession of such weapons.
  - About 20,000 people demonstrate in the cities of Paris, Berlin and Geneva to protest against the government's military offensive in Colombo against the rebellion Tigers Tamils in the north-eastern Sri Lanka. The demonstrators wore T-shirts calling for an end to the genocide in Sri Lanka and wore red flags with the symbol of Tigers of Tamil Eelam.
  - Sri Lankan artillery attacks in the last 24 hours in the Vanni result in the deaths of at least 52 Tamils.
- 5 February:
  - Prime Minister Ratnasiri Wickremanayake announced that an amnesty will be given to Tamil Tiger rebels who lay down their arms against the offensive government army, while the Defense Secretary and brother of the President, Gotabaya Rajapaksa, the government would accept the complete capitulation of the Tigers of the LTTE, which would close a total military defeat in the north: "Only an unconditional surrender would end the offensive."
  - Muttiah Muralitharan of Sri Lanka's national cricket team becomes the highest wicket-taker in One Day Internationals with 503.
- 6 February:
  - More (2,500) Tamil civilians managed to flee the war zone where government troops clash and last square of separatist Tamil Tiger rebels to Visuamadu in the area controlled by government and 3,000 others preparing to follow them. The Liberation Tigers of Tamil Eelam are cornered in an area of 200 km (2)) (jungle which is concentrated around 200,000 Tamil civilians.
  - An angry mob, shouting slogans, attacked the buildings of the International Committee of the Red Cross (ICRC) at once throwing stones in the capital Colombo, breaking several windows. The demonstrators were dispersed by police and no injuries were reported. The Red Cross has recently repeatedly expressed its concern over the fate of thousands of Tamil civilians caught in the fighting raging in the north of island between army and Tamil rebels.
  - Sri Lanka's government refuses to negotiate with the Tamil Tigers at what it calls a "crucial and final stage" of the ongoing civil war.
- 8 February – According to the Department of Defense, at least 10,000 civilians Tamil fled from the area four days of war in which confront government forces and separatist Tamil rebels in north-east. They came in large part to Kilinochchi and some others Jaffna. Among them, "nearly 2 800 children and 3 000 women among the civilian survivors. Medical care, food and water were supplied to them by the authorities, who once again accused the Tamil rebels of using the civilians as "human shields". About (200,000 Tamil residents remain stranded in the combat zone where "hundreds" have been killed since January 1. However, no journalists, members of NGOs or international observers are allowed to visit the war zone.
- 9 February:
  - A suicide bombing by a woman, when she would be controlled, among refugees fleeing the conflict zones in Sri Lanka, is 28 dead, including 24 soldiers and 4 civilians wounded in a refugee camp in Vishvamadu, a town north of the island recently taken by the army in its advance against areas held by the Liberation Tigers of 'Tamil Eelam.
  - A Tamil Tiger suicide bomber kills 28 people and injures 90 others at a Sri Lankan refugee camp.
- 17 February – UNICEF accuses the Tamil Tiger rebels have stepped up recruitment of child soldiers to their final battle against government forces in northern Iraq.
- 20 February:
  - Two Tamil Tiger rebel aircraft attack Sri Lanka's largest city, Colombo, killing 2 and injuring 45.
  - Tamil separatist rebels have carried out an air attack on Colombo, the Sri Lankan capital, two light aircraft. At least two people were killed and 44 others were injured after an aircraft had dropped a bomb on the main building of the Treasury. The two planes were shot down.
- 22 February – The Tamil Tigers kill 10 people in Kirimetiyagara, Sri Lanka.

=== March ===
- 2 March – Two thousand Tamil people have been killed and 5,000 injured in Vanni District during Sri Lanka's civil war.
- 3 March – Gunmen attack a bus carrying Sri Lankan cricketers in Lahore, Pakistan, killing six policemen and two civilians, injuring six team members, and critically injuring reserve umpire Ahsan Raza.
- 4 March – A Tamil employee of the International Committee of the Red Cross (ICRC) was killed in the war zone of the north where the Army faces a last square of Tamil rebels.
- 6 March – Beginning of a broad military offensive against the rebels last cornered in a district of the region Mullaitivu. The stated aim is to end with the final Liberation Tigers of Tamil Eelam (LTTE).
- 7 March – The army claims the deaths of at least 32 rebels in fighting against a final four rebel Liberation Tigers of Tamil Eelam driven in 100 km2 of jungle in the region Mullaitivu. According to the Department of Defense rebels have killed three civilians trying to flee the war zone.
- 9 March – The army claims to have discovered the bodies of 80 Tamil rebels in the region Mullaitivu, scene of bitter fighting between the Armed and last square of Liberation Tigers of Tamil Eelam. The rebels are now identified in an area of fifty square kilometers. This new record brings to 180 the number of suspected rebels killed since Friday by the military.
- 10 March:
  - A suicide bombing outside a mosque of Akuressa, 160 kilometers south of the capital, killing at least 15 people and injured others, including 2 ministers – the Post and Telecommunications and his colleague culture – attending a reception.
  - In 2 days, 74 Tamil civilians, including 25 children, were killed in the bombing of the army on the last area still controlled by the separatist Tamil rebels in the northeast.
  - At least ten people are killed and 25 injured during a suicide attack in Matara, Sri Lanka.
- 12 March – United Nations High Commissioner for Human Rights Navanethem Pillay accuses Sri Lanka's Armed Forces and the Tamil Tigers of possible war crimes.
- 30 March – At least 24 Tamil rebels and Sri Lankan sailor was killed in a naval battle off the coast of northeastern Sri Lanka, the last stronghold of the separatist insurgents. The armed forces sank four boats of the Liberation Tigers of Tamil Eelam (LTTE) off the coast of Mullaitivu . According to the government, whose army has been conducting an offensive three months it appears as "final" against the last four of separatist Tamil Tigers forced a strip of land 21 km 2, are on the brink of defeat full military.

=== April ===
- 8 April – According to a site close to the Tamil rebels, at least 129 civilians were killed and 282 others were injured in a bombing of the government army against the last square of Tamil rebels. General Udaya Nanayakkara, a spokesman for the Army states that " these are inventions of the LTTE to attract the attention of the international community and increase the pressure for a cease-fire that would allow leaders Tigers to escape the army . " The Tamil Tigers are confined to a strip of land and jungle 14 km 2, in the department of Mullaitivu, an area on the Sri Lanka area of cease-fire. 70 000 to 100 000 Tamil civilians are trapped in this area and serve as the ski Lankan government "human shields" to the insurgents.
- 11 April – One hundred thousand demonstrators marched through London to demand a cease-fire in Sri Lanka where the military is trying to crush the rebellion in Tamil separatists. The demonstrators were largely made up of many Tamil families with women and children.
- 12 April – President Mahinda Rajapakse ordered a cease-fire for 48 hours with the rebels on the occasion of Tamil New Year celebrations which begin Monday. This is to allow civilians trapped in the combat zone to celebrate the new year. The Secretary General of the UN, Ban Ki-moon, called the insider "useful first step" toward "a cessation of fighting in the peace and order." The latest estimate to 150 000 100 000 Tamil civilians are trapped in the fighting.
- 14 April – The Tamil rebels who have now lost the de facto war against the government army, declare their readiness to conclude a cease-fire and negotiations with the government.
- 15 April – The armed forces resumed their offensive after a two-day truce to allow civilians to flee the war zone.
- 19 April – The armed forces announced that they have been able to "save" some 5,000 civilians held by the Liberation Tigers of Tamil Eelam (LTTE).
- 20 April:
  - President Mahinda Rajapakse said that 35,000 civilians managed to flee the area held by Tamil rebels and believes that the "complete defeat" of the separatist guerrilla movement is imminent. He said the situation is clear: " It is now completely finished for the Tigers '" Velupillaï Prabhakaran only has to go "while the Ministry of Defence gives 24 hours to rebel Liberation Tigers of Tamil Eelam (LTTE) to surrender. Cornered in a pocket of 15 km 2, the rebels still hold "human shields" between 70 000 and 100 000 Tamil.
  - At Paris (France), an early evening event involving hundreds of Tamils in the area of the Gare du Nord degenerates. Incidents erupted, protesters toppled garbage cans in the middle of the street and some of them threw bottles at police, the windows of three bus RATP, two cars and a truck were broken, 210 people were arrested, according to police headquarters.
- 21 April – The military announced that 39,081 civilians have been an overflow line of defense of the Liberation Tigers of Tamil Eelam (LTTE) and flee.
- 22 April:
  - The armed forces announced the surrender of the principal communications officer of the Liberation Tigers of Tamil Eelam Media Velayudam Dayanidi, alias "Daya Master," and another leader of the LTTE – nicknamed "George". The army nibble little to little the last bastion held by the insurgents, who have accused the military of massacring more than a thousand civilians in the bombing Monday.
  - According to the International Committee of the Red Cross (ICRC), the military operation against the Liberation Tigers of Tamil Eelam (LTTE) threatens tens of thousands of civilians and the humanitarian situation on the ground is "catastrophic." According to MSF, the situation in this conflict is "hopelessly conventional." Civilians bear the brunt of a protracted conflict, but the current phase is by far the most violent for a long time. In the north-east, predominantly Tamil people are displaced at the whim of fighting since June 2008. Government forces accuse the Tigers of using civilians as human shields, the Tigers claim the contrary they are fleeing the atrocities of the army 2.
  - The Security Council of UN demands that Tamil rebels lay down their arms, surrender and release the civilians hold it hostage, he "urges all parties, including the Sri Lankan government, to meet their obligations" protection of civilians.
- 24 April – According to the military, Velupillai Prabhakaran, leader of the Liberation Tigers of Tamil Eelam, the head of his troops and surrounded by the army, preparing to fight a final battle while about 20 000 to 50 000 civilians, according to sources, remain prisoners of the war zone. Cornered and unseen for 18 months, "number one Tiger," for over 30 years at the helm of the bloody guerrilla hardliner, could kill himself with a pellet of cyanide rather than surrender. According to the UN, since the beginning of the final offensive, more than 95,000 civilians have been able to reach the refugee camps outside the combat zone who have hundreds of civilians dead and wounded three .
- 25 April – In Paris, France, some 10,000 people, according to police, appear to denounce the "genocide" of Tamils in Sri Lanka: "We, the Tamils, we are not terrorists. We want our homeland."
- 26 April – The LTTE announce a cease-fire unilaterally in the conflict zone in the northeast, to allow humanitarian organizations to help civilians trapped by fighting.
- 28 April – The Sri Lankan government denies Swedish Foreign Minister Carl Bildt a visa.
- 29 April – The foreign ministers of Britain David Miliband and French Bernard Kouchner is visiting Colombo, the capital, to try to get a "cease-fire, humanitarian" and "reiterate the call of the international community the cease-fire, to respect international humanitarian law and protect civilians. " The Swedish Foreign Minister Carl Bildt, who was part of the trip, was denied a visa to enter the country.

=== May ===
- 2 May – The rebellion of the Liberation Tigers of Tamil Eelam (LTTE) accused the military of killing at least 64 civilians and 87 wounded in the bombing of two artillery fire from a medical facility the enclave of 5 km 2 they still control. According to General Udaya Nanayakkara, the Sri Lankan military denies having bombed the hospital, "it could be a mistake to fire the Tigers." However, according to satellite images from UNOSAT – a UN program providing satellite imagery used in particular in humanitarian assistance or disaster prevention – new craters, due to aerial bombardment, in area reserved for civilians would have appeared recently.
- 3 May – The rebellion of the Liberation Tigers of Tamil Eelam calls "the British and French Ministers of Foreign Affairs to continue their initiative to resolve the terrible humanitarian crisis of the Tamil people" and for a cease- fire while the Sri Lankan government has again lashed the West calls for a cease-fire, humanitarian.
- 5 May – According to the Prime Minister Ratnasiri Wickremanayake, the leader of the Liberation Tigers of Tamil Eelam, Velupillaï Prabhakaran is trapped on a tiny coastal strip of 4 km 2 in the northeast while fighting continues as 15 000 to 20 000 civilians it would still "human shields". According to the Ministry of Defence, Navy patrol along the 4 km beach still in the hands of the rebels while on earth, the army continues operations with "utmost restraint" in taking in a vice between the thin language sea and a lagoon. The armed forces say they are ready for Friday to give the final blow to the LTTE, despite two weeks of calls from the international community to a "cease-fire, humanitarian".
- 10 May – In the night from Saturday to Sunday, the army launched a major attack, killing 257 civilians, including 67 children, and injuring 814 others, including 112 children. The UN says more than 6500 civilians were probably killed and 14,000 were wounded since the army launched in January its "final offensive" against rebels of the Liberation Tigers of Tamil Eelam (LTTE) Peninsula's northeast.
- 13 May – Artillery shelling kills 50 people and injures 40 more at a hospital in Sri Lanka's war zone.
- 15 May – The military says Tamil rebels 'abandon' the fight against the pressure of the SLA. In the evening, President Mahinda Rajapaksa said that the government offensive would end within 48 hours with the recovery of the total narrow territory still controlled by Tamil separatists.
- 16 May:
  - President Mahinda Rajapakse said to the representatives of eleven developing countries (G11) meeting in Jordan: "I am proud to announce that [...] my Government, with the total commitment of the armed forces finally defeated the Tigers militarily Liberation Tigers of Tamil Eelam (LTTE) during a humanitarian operation unprecedented "saying he would return Sunday to his country as" leader of a nation that has crushed terrorism."
  - According to General Udaya Nanayakkara, the army took full control of the cutting edge access to the sea to the rebel Liberation Tigers of Tamil Eelam who want to escape.
  - The international community is increasingly concerned about the plight of civilians in the war zone, facing the bombing, although the Sri Lankan government denied the use of heavy weapons. The International Committee of the Red Cross has warned against "a humanitarian disaster unimaginable" for the hundreds of injured who can not receive any treatment. The UN says 7,000 civilians were probably killed and 16,700 were wounded since the army launched in January its "final offensive".
- 17 May:
  - The Liberation Tigers of Tamil Eelam agree to a ceasefire in Sri Lanka's civil war. (CNN)
  - According to General Udaya Nanayakkara, a spokesman of the army, all civilians, who were the "hostages" of Tamil rebels have been freed and saved: "More than 50,000 people came out of that area Over the last three days." This information confirms the figure given by the UN estimated that 50,000 civilians were trapped by the fighting as the army's estimated 20 000 or less. On the other hand, the leader of Liberation Tigers of Tamil Eelam, Velupillaï Prabhakaran, is now entrenched in an ultimate "pocket" of resistance.
- 18 May – The Sri Lankan government declares an end to its civil war with the Tamil Tigers, ending almost 26 years of fighting.
  - According to the Ministry of Defence, Chief of the Liberation Tigers of Tamil Eelam, Velupillaï Prabhakaran, was killed today by the army when he tried to escape on board an ambulance company two lieutenants. DNA identification is underway for his body was horribly burned in the fire of the vehicle.
  - The army announced that there is now no more rebels in the area of military operations after the last few fights. In total 300 officers and LTTE fighters were killed during these final battles. A judge has ordered police to conduct scientific autopsies and DNA tests on the corpses 5.
  - The government announced that the war against the Liberation Tigers of Tamil Eelam (LTTE) is over after the death of all the leaders of the separatist guerrillas, including its chief Prabhakaran Velupillaï.
  - A demonstration of 2500 pro-Tamil degenerates to Parliament in London (United Kingdom). 5 police and 11 demonstrators were injured and 10 people were arrested.
- 19 May:
  - President Mahinda Rajapakse said in a speech to Parliament that Tamil rebels of the Liberation Tigers of Tamil Eelam have been "completely defeated" by the government army that now controls the entire territory of the country: "The authority of the State now takes place on every inch of territory. We totally defeated terrorism. " In his speech the Head of State insisted on a necessary political settlement between the majority Sinhalese (74%) and the Tamil minority (12.5%), the historical tensions have fed the roots of the separatist conflict began in 1972, ensuring making war on the LTTE and not the Tamils. The president, architect since 2006 military victory against the Tigers, has pledged for years to find a "political settlement" through "a power-sharing agreement" between communities 6.
  - The moderate Tamil politicians hoped that his demands for more political autonomy will not be buried by the Sinhalese nationalist regime, hoping that the head of state will implement the 13 th Amendment to the Constitution providing for decentralization to the nine provinces Sri Lanka, especially those in the north and east where Tamils are concentrated.
- 20 May:
  - The UN war since the early 1980 between the Sri Lankan army and Tamil rebels in the north of the island would have up to 100 000 deaths, according to the latest estimates. The UN humanitarian agencies reiterate their request for "full access without impediment" to the conflict zone "where people are still and must be evacuated."
  - According to UNHCR, "some 80,000 people left the former conflict zone last three days" bringing the total number of people who" fled the fighting in recent months to 280 000 [...] civilians coming out of the area conflict are sick, hungry and suffering from severe malnutrition and dehydration [...] the restrictions imposed by the authorities for access to the refugee camp limit the capacity of UNHCR to provide assistance to displaced persons. "
  - The NGO "Doctors Without Borders" (MSF) today announced the opening of a field hospital of 100 beds in the area of Manic Farm, 30 km southwest of Vavuniya (north) to cope with an influx of wounded, lamenting the humanitarian do not have access to the combat zone, with the exception of the Red Cross. This hospital full, open with the permission of the Sri Lankan government, will relieve the Vavuniya hospital, where about 1500 patients are hospitalized for 250 beds. Three surgeons and four anaesthesiologists working in this particular structure medical and surgical.
- 21 May – In group Defense of Human Rights – including Amnesty International and Human Rights Watch – Children suspected of having fought in the guerrilla Tamil, is removed in several camps in the area of Vavuniya (north) with the tacit approval of authorities. Most of these abductions, some children as young as 12 years, would be made by Tamil paramilitaries who have allegiance to the authorities of Sri Lanka to fight the Liberation Tigers of Tamil Eelam (LTTE). These children would be used to identify former child soldiers who have fought in Tamil.
- 22 May – Secretary of State for Defence, Gotabhaya Rajapakse said that since the beginning of the final offensive against Tamil separatists in August 2006, "the security forces, including Army, Navy The air force, police and civil defense, lost 6261 staff while 29 551 were injured. "
- 23 May – United Nations Secretary-General Ban Ki-moon demands better humanitarian aid for 250,000 war refugees in Sri Lanka.
- 26 May – The UN High Commissioner for Human Rights, Navi Pillay, said that "there were good reasons to think that both sides had broadly violated the fundamental principles of the inviolability civilians, "while aid agencies accuse Sri Lankan military of bombing civilians and insurgents to be used as" human shields "in the former war zone of north-east of the country, when of the final blows of the army in early January to late April. The UN believes that at least 7,000 civilians were killed in four months.
- 30 May – More than 5000 Tamil demonstrators marched today in Berlin, calling for international sanctions against Sri Lanka and an investigation into violations of human rights by the army.

=== June ===
- 3 June – Large military parade presided over by President Mahinda Rajapakse, the majestic Galle Face promenade in Colombo to celebrate the victory over the Tamil rebels. According to The Times and Le Monde, the ultimate battle of the Northeast between January and May, would have killed 20,000 civilians.
- 16 June – A Sri Lankan government investigation into human rights abuses during its offensive with Tamil Tiger rebels disbands.

=== August ===
- 6 August – The new leader of the rebel Liberation Tigers of Tamil Eelam (LTTE), defeated by the army in May, was arrested in Thailand. Selvarasa Pathmanathan, better known by his initials KP, was arrested in Bangkok and handed over to Sri Lankan authorities. He was also wanted by Interpol for arms trafficking.

=== October ===
- 22 October – A U.S. official report raises the possibility that crimes against humanity were committed in Sri Lanka during the regular army offensive against the Tamil Tigers earlier this year. The reported events involve both the Tamil rebellion of the Liberation Tigers of Tamil Eelam (LTTE) and the Colombo government. The Sri Lankan army is also accused of failing to comply on two occasions, the cease-fire held to allow civilians to leave combat zones. It would also have killed the prisoners and activists trying to surrender.

=== December ===
- 1 December – 128,000 civilians displaced during the war against the Tamil separatist rebellion and herded into camps for months, have officially been released. In total 280,000 Tamil refugees were accommodated in camps. Many villages were destroyed during the conflict, most of the refugees will have to spend some time in the camps until they found work and housing.

== Sport ==
- 3 January – Mahela Jayawardene played his 100th Test match (vs Bangladesh)
- 12 January – Ajantha Mendis fastest to reach 50 wickets, in ODI, in his 19th match when he dismissed Ray Price (Zimbabwe).
- 16 January – Kumar Sangakkara reached 7,000 runs in ODIs (vs Bangladesh)
- 21 January – Mahela Jayawardene broke the record of catches by non wicket keeper, in ODI, vs. Pakistan with 157, when he caught Salman Butt.
- 24 January – Muttiah Muralitharan got his 500th ODI wicket (vs Pakistan)
- 28 January – Sanath Jayasuriya reached 13,000 run in ODI (vs India)
- 3 February – Mahela Jayawardene reached 8,000 ODI runs (vs India)
- 5 February – Muttiah Muralitharan broke the record of wickets taken with 503, in ODIs, when he dismissed Gautam Gambhir.
- 21 February – Mahela Jayawardene reached 8,000 runs in Test (vs Pakistan)
- 22 February – Mahela Jayawardene & Thilan Samaraweera broke the record for the 4th wicket, in Test, with 437 runs vs Pakistan. Shoaib Malik ended the partnership by dismissing Jayawardene. The partnership faced 651 balls and Jayawardene contributed 199 runs, Samaraweera 231 runs.
- 24 July – Kumar Sangakkara reached 7,000 runs scored in Test, vs Pakistan.
- 1 August – Mahela Jayawardene played his 300th ODI Match.

== Deaths ==
=== January ===
- 8 January – Lasantha Wickrematunge, 50, journalist, shot.
- 20 January – Mark Fernando, 67, jurist, member of the Supreme Court of Sri Lanka, cancer.

=== February ===
- February 12 – Punniyamurthy Sathyamurthy, 36, journalist, airstrike.

=== April ===
- April 18 – Tissa Abeysekara, 69, film director, writer and actor, brain haemorrhage.

=== May ===
- May 11 – Shanthi Lekha, 79, actress.
- May 12 – Mohan Saliya Ellawala, 61, politician, Governor of Sabaragamuwa Province (2008–2009), after long illness.
- May 18
  - Velupillai Prabhakaran, 54, rebel, leader of the LTTE, missile attack.
  - Balasingham Nadesan, rebel, political chief of the Liberation Tigers of Tamil Eelam (LTTE), missile attack.
  - Thillaiyampalam Sivanesan, 45, rebel, leader of the LTTE naval wing (Sea Tigers), missile attack.
  - Shanmugalingam Sivashankar, rebel, leader of the LTTE intelligence wing, missile attack.
- May 21 – Kanagasabai Pathmanathan, 64, politician.

=== June ===
- June 12 – Annesley Dias, comedian.

=== July ===
- July 12 – Shesha Palihakkara, 81, dancer, actor and producer.
- July 25 – Sarath Ranawaka, 58, politician, after short illness.

=== August ===
- August 12 – Nalin Seneviratne, 78, general, Commander of the Army (1985–1988).
- August 24 – Frank Marcus Fernando, 77, Bishop of Chilaw.
