= Karunasena =

Karunasena is both a given name and a surname. Notable people with the name include:

- Karunasena Jayalath (1928–1994), Sri Lankan newspaper editor
- Karunasena Kodituwakku (born 1945), Sri Lankan politician
- Ruchira Karunasena (born 1977), Sri Lankan cricketer
- W. A. Karunasena (born 1928), Ceylonese politician
