= List of Sri Lankan non-career diplomats =

This is a list of Sri Lankan non-career diplomats, who have been appointed by the Government of Sri Lanka as Ambassadors and High Commissioners, but are not career diplomats by profession, meaning they are not from the Sri Lanka Foreign Service, but are from different professions.

== Academics ==
- Nalin de Silva - Ambassador to Myanmar
- J. B. Disanayake - Ambassador to Thailand
- Ananda W. P. Guruge - Ambassador to France, Ambassador Extraordinary and Plenipotentiary to UNESCO and USA
- Lal Jayawardane - High Commissioner to United Kingdom
- W. S. Karunaratne - Ambassador to US
- Karunasena Kodituwakku - Ambassador to Japan, Republic of South Korea and China (note: also listed under "Parliamentarians" and "Provincial Governors")
- Gunapala Piyasena Malalasekera - Ambassador to Soviet Union, High Commissioner to United Kingdom, Canada and Ambassador / Permanent Representative to United Nations in New York
- Ediriweera Sarachchandra - Ambassador to France

== Architects ==
- Oliver Weerasinghe - Ambassador to USA

== Business ==
- A. S. P. Liyanage - Ambassador to Qatar, former High Commissioner to Nigeria
- Udayanga Weeratunga - Ambassador to Russian Federation
- Jaliya Wickramasuriya - Ambassador to USA

== Chief Justices ==
- Mohan Peiris - Permanent Representative of Sri Lanka to the United Nations
- Jayantha Jayasuriya - Permanent Representative of Sri Lanka to the United Nations

== Corporate executives ==
- Somasunadaran Skandakumar - High Commissioner to Australia

== Civil servants ==
- Arthur Ranasinghe - Ceylon's Ambassador to Italy and Greece
- Richard Aluwihare - High Commissioner to India
- Sirisena Amarasekara - High Commissioner to South Africa
- Shirley Amerasinghe - High Commissioner to India, Ambassador to Nepal and Afghanistan and Permanent Representative to United Nations (New York)
- Velupillai Coomaraswamy - High Commissioner to Canada
- Gunasena de Soyza - High Commissioner to United Kingdom
- N. Q. Dias - High Commissioner to India
- Austin Fernando - High Commissioner to India
- Lionel Fernando - High Commissioner to Malaysia, Ambassador to the Netherlands and France (note: also listed in "Provincial Governors")
- Neville Jayaweera - Ambassador to Sweden, Norway, Denmark and Finland
- K. C. Logeswaran - Ambassador to Republic of Korea
- S. J. Walpita - Ambassador to the Federal Republic of Germany, the Netherlands and Belgium
- Nissanka Wijeyeratne - Ambassador to Soviet Union (note: also listed in "Parliamentarians")

== Economists ==
- Gamani Corea - Ambassador to the EEC, Belgium, Luxembourg and the Netherlands
- Lal Jayawardena - High Commissioner to the United Kingdom and Ambassador to the Benelux countries
- Herbert Tennekoon - Ambassador to Japan

== Filmmakers ==
- Sumitra Peries - Ambassador to France

== Journalists ==
- Ernest Corea - Ambassador to USA; High Commissioner to Canada
- Dayan Jayatilleka - Permanent Representative to United Nations (Geneva); Consul General for Switzerland; Ambassador to France and UNESCO and Ambassador of Sri Lanka to Russia

== Judges ==
- H. W. Thambiah - High Commissioner to Canada

== Lawyers ==
- Kusumsiri Balapatabendi - High Commissioner to Australia
- John De Saram - Ambassador / Permanent Representative to United Nations (New York)
- H.L. de Silva - Ambassador / Permanent Representative to United Nations (New York)
- Neville Kanakeratne - Ambassador to USA and High Commissioner to India
- Faisz Musthapha - High Commissioner to the U.K.
- Daya Perera - Ambassador / Permanent Representative to United Nations (New York) and High Commissioner to Canada
- Lalitha Rajapakse - Ambassador to France and High Commissioner to the U.K.
- Jayathri Samarakone - High Commissioner to Singapore
- Wickrema Weerasuriya - High Commissioner to Australia and New Zealand
- Tissa Wijeyeratne - Ambassador to France, Switzerland and UNESCO

== Physicians ==
- M. V. P. Peiris - Ambassador to Soviet Union and High Commissioner to United Kingdom (note: also listed in "Senators")

== Military officers ==
=== Army ===
- D. S. Attygalle - High Commissioner to United Kingdom
- Rohan Daluwatte - Ambassador to Brazil
- G. H. De Silva - High Commissioner to Pakistan
- Denis Perera - High Commissioner to Australia
- Jagath Jayasuriya - Ambassador to Brazil
- Shantha Kottegoda - Ambassador to Brazil and Thailand
- Nanda Mallawaarachchi - Ambassador to Indonesia
- Anton Muttukumaru - High Commissioner to Australia, New Zealand, Pakistan and Ambassador to Egypt
- Janaka Perera - High Commissioner to Australia, and Ambassador to Indonesia
- Cyril Ranatunga - High Commissioner to Australia and United Kingdom
- Richard Udugama - Ambassador to Iraq (note: also listed in "Parliamentarians")
- Cecil Waidyaratne - Ambassador to Thailand
- Srilal Weerasooriya - High Commissioner to Pakistan
- T. I. Weerathunga - High Commissioner to Canada

=== Navy ===
- Jayanath Colombage - Ambassador to Indonesia
- Asoka de Silva - Ambassador to Cuba
- Wasantha Karannagoda - Ambassador to Japan
- Thisara Samarasinghe - High Commissioner to Australia
- Nishantha Ulugetenne - Ambassador to Cuba
- Ravindra Wijegunaratne - High Commissioner to Pakistan

=== Air Force ===
- Gagan Bulathsinghala - Ambassador to Islamic Republic of Afghanistan
- Sumangala Dias - High Commissioner to Malaysia
- Kapila Jayampathy - High Commissioner to Malaysia
- Donald Perera - Ambassador to Israel
- Jayalath Weerakkody - High Commissioner to Pakistan

== Police officers ==
- Rudra Rajasingham - Ambassador to Indonesia
- Ana Seneviratne - High Commissioner to Malaysia
- Herbert Weerasinghe - High Commissioner to Malaysia

== Politicians ==
Governors general

- Sir Oliver Goonetilleke - High Commissioner to United Kingdom
- William Gopallawa - Ambassador to China, Cuba, Mexico and USA

Senators

- Razik Fareed - High Commissioner to Pakistan
- Stanley Kalpage - High Commissioner to India and Ambassador / Permanent Representative to United Nations in New York
- Reggie Perera - Ambassador to Egypt
- Lalitha Rajapakse - Ambassador to France and High Commissioner to United Kingdom (note: also listed in "Lawyers")
- A. F. Wijemanne - Ambassador to Italy and Permanent Representative to FAO
- Edwin Wijeyeratne - High Commissioner to United Kingdom and India

State and legislative councilors

- Claude Corea - Ambassador to USA and High Commissioner to United Kingdom
- Susantha de Fonseka - Ambassador to Burma and Japan
- Tuan Burhanudeen Jayah - High Commissioner to Pakistan
- Don Baron Jayatilaka - High Commissioner to India
- C. W. W. Kannangara - Ambassador to Indonesia
- Tikiri Bandara Panabokke - Representative of the Government of Ceylon to India

Provincial governors

- Dixon Dela Bandara - High Commissioner to Maldives
- Janaka Priyantha Bandara - Ambassador to the UAE & Myanmar (note: also listed in "Parliamentarians")
- Rohitha Bogollagama - High Commissioner to United Kingdom (note: also listed in "Parliamentarians")
- Lionel Fernando - High Commissioner to Malaysia, Ambassador to the Netherlands and France (note: also listed in "Civil servants")
- E. L. B. Hurulle - High Commissioner to Australia (note: also listed in "Parliamentarians")
- Karunasena Kodituwakku - Ambassador to Japan, Republic of South Korea and China (note: also listed in "Academics" and "Parliamentarians")
- Ariya Rekawa - Ambassador to Philippines (note: also listed in "Parliamentarians")
- Noel Wimalasena - High Commissioner to United Kingdom (note: also listed in "Parliamentarians")

Parliamentarians

- Ferial Ashraff - High Commissioner to Singapore
- Dharmasena Attygalle - High Commissioner to Pakistan
- Janaka Priyantha Bandara - Ambassador to the UAE & Myanmar
- Rohitha Bogollagama - High Commissioner to United Kingdom (note: also listed in "Provincial Governors")
- Sirisena Cooray - High Commissioner to Malaysia
- Fredrick de Silva - Ambassador to France, Switzerland and UNESCO
- William de Silva - High Commissioner to Canada
- A.E. Goonesinha - Ambassador to Indonesia and Burma (Myanmar)
- Tudor Gunasekara - Ambassador to Poland, Bulgaria, Rumania and Hungary
- Robert Gunawardena - Ambassador to China
- Senerat Gunewardene - High Commissioner to United Kingdom, Ambassador to Italy, USA and Ambassador / Permanent Representative to United Nations (New York)
- E. L. B. Hurulle - High Commissioner to Australia (note: also listed in "Parliamentarians" and "Provincial Governors")
- Karu Jayasuriya - Ambassador to Germany
- P.B.G. Kalugalla - High Commissioner to Canada and Ambassador to Philippines
- Rupa Karunathilake - Ambassador to Netherlands
- Karunasena Kodituwakku - Ambassador to Japan, Republic of South Korea and China (note: also listed in "Academics" and "Provincial Governors")
- Anil Moonesinghe - Ambassador to Austria, Bosnia-Herzegovina, Croatia, the Czech Republic, Hungary, Slovakia, Slovenia, Yugoslavia, the UN (Vienna), IAEA and OPEC
- Mangala Moonesinghe - High Commissioner to United Kingdom and India
- Susil Moonesinghe - Ambassador to Iran
- Theodore Braybrooke Panabokke - High Commissioner to India
- R. S. Pelpola - High Commissioner to Malaysia
- Wilmot A. Perera - Ambassador to China
- H. R. Piyasiri - Ambassador to Myanmar
- C. Rajadurai - High Commissioner to Malaysia
- Ariya Rekawa - Ambassador to Philippines
- Rosy Senanayake - High Commissioner to Malaysia
- T.B. Subasinghe - Ambassador to Soviet Union
- Nissanka Wijeyeratne - Ambassador to Soviet Union (note: also listed in "Civil servants")
- Noel Wimalasena - High Commissioner to United Kingdom
- Richard Udugama - Ambassador to Iraq (note: also listed in "Military officers")
- Mahinda Samarasinghe - Ambassador to USA

Mayors

- Omar Kamil - Ambassador to Iran, accredited to Azerbaijan and Turkmenistan
- A. J. M. Muzammil - High Commissioner to Malaysia

== UN officials ==
- T. D. S. A. Dissanayake - Sri Lankan Ambassador to Indonesia and Egypt
- Palitha Kohona - Ambassador / Permanent Representative to United Nations (New York)
