= Lokubandara =

Lokubandara is a surname. Notable people with the surname include:

- Dilasri Lokubandara (born 1993), Sri Lankan cricketer
- Udith Lokubandara (born 1984), Sri Lankan politician
- W. J. M. Lokubandara (1941–2021), Sri Lankan politician
