= Private tuition in Sri Lanka =

Private tuition in Sri Lanka, often referred to as the tuition industry or shadow education, refers to supplementary academic instruction provided outside the formal school system for a fee. It is a widespread phenomenon in the country and is closely linked with preparation for national examinations such as the General Certificate of Education Ordinary Level (GCE O/L) and General Certificate of Education Advanced Level (GCE A/L).

The sector operates alongside Sri Lanka's free public education system and has grown into a significant parallel education structure. Researchers often describe it as a form of shadow education because it mirrors the curriculum and examination structure of the formal education system.

Private tuition has become a major component of Sri Lanka's education culture and is widely attended by students across both urban and rural areas.

== History ==
Sri Lanka's modern education system was shaped by the Kannangara educational reforms of the 1940s, which introduced free education and expanded access to schooling throughout the country. Despite the availability of free schooling, private tutoring began to emerge as students sought additional preparation for competitive national examinations. By the late twentieth century, private tuition had become a common feature of secondary education in Sri Lanka.

Education researchers have described private tutoring in Sri Lanka as a shadow education system that replicates school curricula and focuses on improving examination performance.

== Growth and economic impact ==
Private tutoring has expanded rapidly since the 1990s. According to research by the Institute of Policy Studies of Sri Lanka, the proportion of households spending money on private tuition increased significantly between 1995 and 2016.

Between 1995 and 2016:

- Urban households paying for tuition increased from 41% to 65%
- Rural households increased from 19% to 62%
- Estate sector households increased from 15% to 36%

By 2016, private tutoring accounted for about 43% of household expenditure on education, making it the largest component of education-related spending.

The tuition sector has also developed into a major private industry. Estimates suggest that Sri Lankan parents spend over LKR 122 billion annually on tuition fees, which is equivalent to about 40% of total public education spending.

Some estimates place the overall revenue of the tutoring industry at over LKR 210 billion per year, reflecting its scale and economic influence.

== Structure ==
Private tuition in Sri Lanka is delivered through several formats.

=== Mass lecture classes ===
Large lecture-style classes conducted in theatres or large halls are one of the most distinctive features of Sri Lanka's tuition culture. These classes may attract hundreds or even thousands of students, particularly for Advanced Level subjects such as combined mathematics, physics, chemistry, and biology.

=== Small group classes ===
Small group classes are conducted in tuition institutes or tutors’ homes. These typically involve fewer students and allow greater interaction between teachers and students.

=== Individual tutoring ===
One-to-one tutoring is offered to students requiring personalised academic support.

=== Online tuition ===
The COVID-19 pandemic accelerated the growth of online tuition in Sri Lanka, with many tutors offering virtual classes and recorded lectures through digital platforms.

== Role in examination preparation ==
Private tutoring plays a major role in preparing students for Sri Lanka's national examinations:

- Grade 5 Scholarship Examination
- GCE Ordinary Level (O/L)
- GCE Advanced Level (A/L)

Studies have shown that the majority of students preparing for these examinations attend at least one tuition class. In one survey, 89% of students reported receiving private tuition, demonstrating the widespread nature of supplementary tutoring.

== Costs and household spending ==
The cost of private tutoring varies depending on the subject, grade level, and type of class. Studies have found that:

- Students from low-income households may spend Rs. 3,000–7,000 per month on tuition.
- Students from higher-income households may spend Rs. 18,000–20,000 per month.

For many households, tuition fees represent the largest component of education-related expenses.

=== Key figures and institutions ===
In Sri Lanka, the "tuition culture" has evolved beyond simple after-school support, offering students additional opportunities to excel while also becoming a powerful industry dominated by celebrity tutors and large institutes.

==== Private tuition teachers ====
Several individuals have gained recognition within Sri Lanka’s private tuition culture.

- Bandula Gunawardhana (born 15 March 1953) – A Sri Lankan politician, economist, and former university lecturer who was previously involved in teaching and the private tuition sector before entering politics.
- Bhanuka Ekanayaka (born 1987, Kurunegala) is a Sri Lankan Information and Communication Technology (ICT) tutor known for conducting Advanced Level ICT classes. He studied at Wickramashila National School from 1993 to 2004 and Maliyadeva College from 2004 to 2006. He later studied at the University of Colombo School of Computing from 2009 to 2011, where he obtained a bachelor's degree in computing.
- Mohan Lal Grero – A Sri Lankan educator, businessman, and politician known for his involvement in private educational institutions and the education sector.
- Upul Shantha Sannasgala – A Sri Lankan writer, journalist, and educator who became widely known as a private tutor of Sinhala language and literature. He has also gained prominence through his books and media appearances.

== Cultural significance ==
Private tuition has become deeply embedded in Sri Lanka's educational culture. Students often attend tuition classes after school and on weekends, particularly in the years leading up to major examinations.

== Criticism and debate ==
The growth of the private tuition sector has generated debate among educators and policymakers.

=== Educational inequality ===
Critics argue that reliance on private tutoring can increase inequality because students from wealthier families can afford more classes and educational resources.

=== Student pressure ===
Students frequently attend tuition classes after school hours and during weekends, which can result in long study hours and increased academic pressure.

=== Impact on free education ===
Some analysts argue that the heavy dependence on private tutoring undermines Sri Lanka's free education system by shifting a significant portion of education costs onto families.
