= Wariyapola =

Town in Sri Lanka

Wariyapola: වාරියපොල; Wariyapola
- Town
- Location within Sri Lanka
- Coordinates: 7.6333°N 80.2333°E
- Country: Sri Lanka
- Province: North Western Province
- District: Kurunegala District

Government
  - Type: Pradesiya Sabha
  - President: Thilakarathna Bandara
- Elevation: 308 ft (94 m)
- Time zone: UTC+5:30 (Sri Lanka Standard Time)
- Postal code: 60400

Wariyapola (වාරියපොල) is a town in the Kurunegala District, North Western province, Sri Lanka. Wariyapola is 94 metres (308 ft) above the sea level. Wariyapola is mostly known by sri Lankans because of the Wariyapola Sri Sumangala Tero, who take down the Union Jack and re-hoisting the Sinhalese lion flag, before the convention that handed over control of the island to the British in 1815.

Wariyapola in Sinhalese means “place for plane landing”, and is believed to be one of the landing sites of Ravana’s chariot or vimana, Dandu Monara Yanthraya.

== Public transport ==
Wariyapola is situated in between Kurunegala and Padeniya Junction, where the Puttalam and Anuradhapura roads intersect. So most of the people from Anuradhapura, Mahawa, Galgamuwa, Puttalam, Anamaduwa, Nikaweratiya areas pass through Wariyapola in order to reach Kurunegala or Colombo.

== Public schools ==
- Ghanodaya M. M. V
- Isipathana M. M. V Bamunakotuwa
- Mahakeliya Maha Vidyalaya
- Navinna School
- Sri Sumangala M. M. V (National School)
- Tissa M. M. V Katupotha
- Wariyapola Sri Sumangala Piriwena (Bhikkhu School)

== Notable individuals ==
- Wariyapola Sri Sumangala Thero
- S. B. Nawinne - Member of Parliament - Kurunegala (1989–1999, 2001–present)
- Amara Piyaseeli Ratnayake - 9th Governor of North Western Province, Member of Parliament - Kurunegala (1989-2010)
- D. B. Herath - Member of Parliament - Kurunegala (2019–present)

== Religions ==
The majority of the people in Wariyapola are Buddhists, with both Christians and Muslims also living in these area. Wariyapola Sri Sumangala Pirewena, Sri Visuddarama Piriwena are Wellagala Rajamaha Vihara are most famous among Buddhist temples and there is also a mosque in Wariyapola.
