= Suren Raghavan =

Sri Lankan academic and politician

- சுரேன் ராகவன் සුරේන් රාගවන්

Member of Parliament for National List
- Incumbent
- Assumed office 20 August 2020

6th Governor of the Northern Province
- In office 7 January 2019 – 20 November 2019
- President: Maithripala Sirisena
- Preceded by: Reginald Cooray
- Succeeded by: P. S. M. Charles

Personal details
- Party: Sri Lanka Freedom Party
- Education: University of Kent
- Profession: Academic
- Ethnicity: Sri Lankan Tamil

Suren Raghavan (Tamil: சுரேன் ராகவன், romanized: Curēṉ Rākavaṉ; Sinhala: සුරේන් රාගවන්, romanized: Surēn Rāgavan) is a Sri Lankan academic and former Governor of the Northern Province. He is of biethnic heritage, classed as Sri Lankan Tamil due to paternal descent.

Raghavan joined the University of Kent's School of Political and International Relations in 2005 on a scholarship from the James Madison Trust and received a Master of Arts degree after producing a dissertation on federalism in Sri Lanka. He then carried out research at the University of Ottawa before returning to the University of Kent in 2008 on another James Madison Trust scholarship to study for his doctorate degree. He was also an Overseas Research Students Awards Scheme scholar from 2008 to 2011 and a recipient of the Ontario Student Assistance Program award. In 2012 he received a doctorate politics and government from the University of Kent after producing a thesis titled Multimational Federaiism and Sinhala Buddhism. Is there a (In)compatibility? The Case of Ethnonationalism in Sri Lanka.

Raghavan was a visiting professor at Saint Paul University, research fellow at the Oxford Centre for Buddhist Studies and a visiting research scholar at the University of Colombo's Department of History. He was chairperson and national director of Colombo School for Critical Studies. He has been a jury member for several film festivals including the OCIC, South Indian Film Federation and Asian Cinema Centre. He organised the Indian Film Festival in Colombo.

Raghavan was appointed adviser to President Maithripala Sirisena and director of the Presidential Media Unit in November 2018. In January 2019 he was appointed Governor of the Northern Province by Sirisena. Following the presidential election in November 2019, newly elected President Gotabaya Rajapaksa ordered Raghavan and all other provincial governors to resign. Following the 2020 parliamentary election he was appointed to the Parliament of Sri Lanka as a National List MP representing the Sri Lanka People's Freedom Alliance.

== Works ==
- Buddhist Monks and the Politics of Lanka’s Civil War: Ethnoreligious Nationalism of the Sinhala Sangha and Peacemaking in Sri Lanka, 1995-2010 (2018, Equinox Publishing)
- Post-War Militancy of Sinhala Saṅgha: Reasons and Reactions (Oxford University Press)
