= Dharmadasa Wanniarachchi =

Sri Lankan politician

Dharmadasa Wanniarachchi (Sinhala: ධර්මදාස වන්නිආරච්චි) (8 June 1921 - 5 October 2007) was a Sri Lankan politician. He was the seventh Governor of the North Western Province of Sri Lanka and a former member of the Sri Lankan Parliament.

Born Wanni Arachchilage Dharmadasa, he was elected to the Parliament of Sri Lanka from Pelmadulla representing the Sri Lanka Freedom Party in a by election in 1965 succeeding W. A. Karunasena. He was re-elected in the 1970 general election and was appointed Deputy Minister of State Enterprises and Scientific Affairs in the Second Sirimavo Bandaranaike government. He lost his seat in the 1977 general election. He was elected in the 2000 general election and was appointed Governor of the North Western Province in 2004. Pavithra Wanniarachchi was his daughter. Wanniarachchi died on 5 October 2007 at the age of 87.

Political offices
Preceded by Siripala Jayaweera	Governor of the North Western Province; 2004–2007	Succeeded by Tissa Balalla
