= P. S. M. Charles =

Current governor of the Northern Province, Sri Lanka

7th Governor of the Northern Province
- In office 17 May 2023 – 23 September 2024
- President: Ranil Wickremesinghe
- Preceded by: Jeevan Thiagarajah
- Succeeded by: N. Vedanayagam
- In office 30 December 2019 – 11 October 2021
- President: Gotabaya Rajapaksa
- Preceded by: Suren Raghavan
- Succeeded by: Jeevan Thiagarajah

Personal details
- Party: Independent
- Education: University of Jaffna
- Occupation: Civil servant
- Ethnicity: Sri Lankan

Prince Sarojini Manmatharajah Charles is a Sri Lankan civil servant who served as the Governor of the Northern Province of Sri Lanka on two occasions, first from 2019 to 2021 then from 2023 to 2024.

Charles is a Catholic and the daughter of a school principal. She has a degree from the University of Jaffna and two master's degrees in disaster management and business administration from the University of Peradeniya and Rajarata University of Sri Lanka, respectively.

Charles was Additional District Secretary (AGA) for the Vavuniya District before becoming District Secretary (GA) for the district in October. She was appointed District Secretary for Batticaloa District in May 2012.

Charles was appointed Director General of Sri Lanka Customs in September 2017. She was removed from the post in January 2019, allegedly after refusing to give in to government pressure in respect of investigations into 143 suspicious cargo containers. She was re-instated swiftly following industrial action by customs workers.

Charles was appointed secretary of the Ministry of Healthcare and Indigenous Medical Services in November 2019. She was sworn in as Governor of the Northern Province on 30 December 2019. In October 2021, Jeevan Thiagarajah replaced her as the new governor of Northern Province. She was reappointed in May 2023 as governor of Northern Province, replacing Thiagarajah.

Upon Anura Kumara Dissanayake taking office as President; Charles resigned. This led to the appointment of Nagalingam Vethanayahan, a former government agent for Jaffna as Governor of Northern Province.
