= National Institute of Infectious Diseases =

National Institute of Infectious Diseases may refer to:

- National Institute of Infectious Diseases (Japan)
- Infectious Disease Hospital, a hospital in Angoda, Sri Lanka, also known as National Institute of Infectious Diseases
- National Institute of Allergy and Infectious Diseases, United States
- Lazzaro Spallanzani National Institute for Infectious Diseases, Italy
