= Lyceum International School =

International school network in Sri Lanka

Location
- Nugegoda, Wattala, Panadura, Ratnapura, Gampaha, Nuwara Eliya, Anuradhapura, Kurunegala, Avissawella, Katunayake; Sri Lanka; 6.870583°N 79.886139°E; Lyceum Main School's location

Information
- Type: Private international school network
- Motto: Know thyself
- Established: 14 June 1993; 33 years ago
- Founder: Mohan Lal Grero
- Principal: Kumari Grero
- Teaching staff: 3,300+
- Employees: 600+ (non-academic)
- Key people: Nikitha Grero (Group Chairman & CEO); Sir Michael Wilshaw (Chief Adviser)
- Grades: Lower Nursery – Grade 12
- Age: 2 to 20
- Enrollment: 25,000+ (2026)
- Student to teacher ratio: 8:1
- Education system: Edexcel (International stream); National Curriculum (Local stream)
- Schedule: 7:30 AM – 1:30 PM
- Houses: Ursa; Aquila; Cetus; Cygnus
- Colours: Blue and Silver
- Song: "Lyceum our alma mater may the torch of learning burn, from body mind and spirit..."
- Athletics: Yes
- Publication: Blossoms, Saroja
- Newspaper: The Lyceumer
- Abbreviation: LIS
- Website: www.lyceum.lk

Lyceum International School (Sinhala: ලයිසියම් ජාත්‍යන්තර පාසල, Tamil: லைசியம் சர்வதேச பாடசாலை), commonly referred to as Lyceum and abbreviated as LIS, is a private international school network in Sri Lanka. Founded on 14 June 1993 by Mohan Lal Grero, it has grown into one of the largest private school networks in the country, with over 25,000 students and more than 3,300 teachers across multiple campuses.

The school provides education from pre-primary to secondary level and offers both an international stream based on Pearson Edexcel and a national stream based on the Sri Lankan curriculum.

== History ==
Lyceum International School was founded on 14 June 1993 by Mohan Lal Grero. According to the school's official history, it began with seven students and four teachers and later expanded into a nationwide network of campuses.

== School ==
=== Branches ===
Lyceum International School has ten branches across Sri Lanka providing both primary and secondary education, and seventeen more branches providing pre-primary education commonly known as "leaf schools". Lyceum International School also has six daycare centres for toddlers.

In addition, Lyceum Campus was introduced in 2022, located in Nugegoda, with state-of-the-art facilities where students can pursue excellence through international standards in a comprehensive campus experience close to home.

Branch	Est.	Students Count	Head of School	Coordinates
Nugegoda	1993	5,300	Savindi Seneviratne	6.870583°N 79.886139°E
Wattala	2001	5,500	Stella Anton	6.986111°N 79.885917°E
Panadura	2000	3,700	Nethan Wijesinghe	6.725583°N 79.904472°E
Ratnapura	2005	2,000	Deepthi Goonasekera	6.687639°N 80.407611°E
Gampaha	2006	2,900	Dilmi Ratnayake	7.104417°N 80.043583°E
Nuwara Eliya	2012	600	Princy Rathnayaka	6.980222°N 80.764611°E
Anuradhapura	2013	850	Asalangika Udawela	8.311722°N 80.433778°E
Kurunegala	2016	2,000	Chandana Basnayake	7.477611°N 80.367472°E
Avissawella	2022	100	Chandana Basnayake	6.933059°N 80.216835°E
Katunayake	2024	100	Christine Francisca Silva	7.149152°N 79.872259°E

=== Curriculum ===
Lyceum's senior school students sit for the Pearson Edexcel International Examinations for their Ordinary Levels and Advanced Level Examinations its examination body.

Since 2010, students are given the option of choosing between the Cambridge syllabus or the National syllabus in the English language, which gives them the opportunity to be eligible for higher education at public universities in Sri Lanka. In 2022, Cambridge syllabus was removed from the curriculum and was replaced by Pearson Edexcel syllabus.

Lyceum has consistently produced some of the island's best examination results, and its students have successfully been enrolled in the world's best universities.

Lyceum has launched the first phase of e-learning at the Lyceum Group along with the instigation of curfew, on the 16 March 2020.

== Events ==
=== Maathra ===
Maathra is an annual cultural dancing event produced and performed by Lyceum International Schools which was envisioned by school's founder, Mohan Lal Grero and administered by Kumari Grero in 2008. Under the guidance of Rasika Kothalawala, the Head of Cultural Dancing, around 600 performers hailing from Lyceum International School branches including Nugegoda, Panadura, Wattala, Ratnapura, Gampaha, Nuwara Eliya, and Kurunagala undergo training annually to showcase their talents at a significant event.

Maathra is considered as the Sri Lanka's largest cultural dancing event of the year and usually takes place in October at BMICH or Nelum Pokuna Theatre. Distinguished chief guests includes Sri Lanka's president and the advisory council of the Lyceum International School.

=== Swara ===
Swara is an annual eastern music event produced and performed by Lyceum International Schools which was conceptualised under the visionary leadership of Dr. Mohan Lal Grero, Founder of Lyceum International Schools, and Dr. Kumari Grero, Consultant Coordinating Principal, Swara embodies a collaborative effort to establish an annual tradition of musical excellence, led by Visharad Mr. Dilum Niranja.

Swara is considered as the Sri Lanka's largest school-based eastern music event of the year and usually takes place in February at Musaeus College Auditorium, Colombo 7.

== Awards ==
Competition	Year	Country	Award/Place	Description
International Cultural Dancing Competition	2018	Russia	World's Best (first place)	Nearly 600 performers from Lyceum International School in Nugegoda, Panadura, Wattala, Ratnapura, Gampaha, Nuwara Eliya and Kurunagala are trained to perform at the event each year. Maathra has won the first place, "World's Best", in International Cultural Dancing Competition held in Russia, 2018.
BestWeb.lk Annual Competition	2023	Sri Lanka	Gold Award (first place)	The Lyceum International School website won the Gold Award for the "Best University and Educational Institute Website in Sri Lanka" (in both government and private education sectors) in the BestWeb.lk 2023 competition.
BestWeb.lk Annual Competition	2024	Sri Lanka	Gold Award (first place)	The Lyceum International School website won the Gold Award for the "Best School Website in Sri Lanka" (in both government and private education sectors) in the BestWeb.lk 2024 competition.

== Achievements ==
=== Model United Nations Club ===
Lyceum is an annual participant of COMUN (Colombo Model United Nations) and SLMUN (Sri Lanka Model United Nations). The Lyceum delegation won the best school and best delegation award in the COMUN 2011 Conference along with several other awards and has also been runners up in most of the previous conferences. Lyceum International School Wattala Branch also has participated in COMUN 2012 Conference winning GA2 Best Delegate Award. Lyceum International School Nugegoda Branch annually Hosts LISMUN Conference.

=== Inter International Schools Athletic Championship (ISAC) ===
Inter International Schools Athletic Championship (ISAC) is the Sri Lanka's biggest school sporting annual event and Lyceum International School was the host for several years. Each year about 23 international schools are participating with over 2,000 athletes in over 100 live sporting events. Lyceum International School Wattala was the consecutive overall winner for over 5 years with the most medals count.

ISAC 2021 and 2022 was not held due to COVID-19. In the most recent ISAC event, the ISAC 2023 Lyceum International School was able to win 175 medals in total with 60 gold, 66 silver and 49 bronze medals.

== Notable alumni ==
- Udith Lokubandara, politician and son of W. J. M. Lokubandara.
- Amanda Ratnayake, businesswoman and beauty pageant titleholder who was crowned Miss Sri Lanka 2013.
- Devnaka Porage, cinema and television actor.

== See also ==
- Education in Sri Lanka
