= List of governors of Northern Province =

Governor of Northern Province
- வட மாகாண ஆளுநர் උතුරු පළාත් ආණ්ඩුකාරවරයා
- Flag of Northern Province
- Incumbent; Nagalingam Vedanayagam since 25 September 2024
- Appointer: President of Sri Lanka
- Term length: 5 years
- Precursor: Governor of the North Eastern Province
- Inaugural holder: Mohan Wijewickrama (acting)
- Formation: 1 January 2007
- Website: np.gov.lk

The governor of the Northern Province of Sri Lanka (Tamil: வட மாகாண ஆளுநர், romanized: Vaṭa Mākāṇa Āḷunar; Sinhala: උතුරු පළාත් ආණ්ඩුකාරවරයා, romanized: Uturu Paḷāt Āṇḍukāravarayā) is the head of the provincial government and exercises executive power over subjects devolved to the Northern Provincial Council. The current governor is Nagalingam Vedanayagam.

== Governors ==
^{No.}	Name	Portrait	Party	Took office	Left office	^{Refs.}
	Mohan Wijewickrama (acting)		Independent	1 January 2007	3 July 2008	
1	Victor Perera		Independent	3 July 2008	10 October 2008	
2	Dickson Sarathchandra Dela		Independent	10 October 2008	12 July 2009	
3	G. A. Chandrasiri		Independent	12 July 2009	January 2015	
4	H. M. G. S. Palihakkara		Independent	27 January 2015	16 February 2016	
5	Reginald Cooray		Sri Lanka Freedom Party	16 February 2016	31 December 2018	
6	Suren Raghavan		Independent	7 January 2019	20 November 2019	
7	P. S. M. Charles		Independent	30 December 2019	11 October 2021	
8	Jeevan Thiagarajah		Independent	11 October 2021	15 May 2023	
9	P. S. M. Charles		Independent	17 May 2023	24 September 2024	
10	Nagalingam Vedanayagam		Independent	25 September 2024	Incumbent	
