= Sarathchandra =

Sarathchandra or Sarath Chandra is a given name and a surname. Notable people with the name include:

- Dickson Sarathchandra Dela, Sri Lankan former governor
- Manoj Sarathchandra (born 1993), Sri Lankan cricketer
- Sarathchandra Rajakaruna (1940–2011), Sri Lankan politician
- Vayalar Sarath Chandra Varma (born 1960), Indian songwriter and poet
