= Janaka Bandara =

Janaka Bandara may refer to:

- Janaka Bandara Tennakoon (born 1953), Sri Lankan politician and minister
- Janaka Priyantha Bandara (born 1968), Sri Lankan governor and diplomat
