= Pelmadulla Electoral District =

Electoral district of Sri Lanka

Pelmadulla electoral district was an electoral district of Sri Lanka between March 1960 and February 1989. The district was named after the town of Pelmadulla in Ratnapura District, Sabaragamuwa Province. The 1978 Constitution of Sri Lanka introduced the proportional representation electoral system for electing members of Parliament. The existing 160 mainly single-member electoral districts were replaced with 22 multi-member electoral districts. Pelmadulla electoral district was replaced by the Ratnapura multi-member electoral district at the 1989 general elections.

== Members of Parliament ==
Key

Independent SLFP UNP

Election	Member	Party	Term
1960 (March)	W. A. Karunasena	SLFP	1960
1960 (July)	W. A. Karunasena	SLFP	1960-1965
1965	W. A. Karunasena	SLFP	1965-1967
1970	Dharmadasa Wanniarachchi	SLFP	1970-1977
1977	Chandrasekera Gankanda	UNP	1977-1989

== Elections ==
=== 1960 (March) Parliamentary General Election ===
Candidate	Party	Symbol	Votes	%
W. A. Karunasena	Sri Lanka Freedom Party	Hand	4,535	30.42
E. C. J. Atukorale	United National Party	Elephant	4,231	28.38
M. P. Jothipala	Mahajana Eksath Peramuna	Key	3,685	24.72
G. H. N. Kulasooriya		Cartwheel	2,228	14.95
D. Sunil Yasapala		Umbrella	142	0.95
Valid Votes			14,821	99.42
Rejected Votes			87	0.58
Total Polled			14,908	100.00
Registered Electors			19,384	
Turnout				76.91

=== 1960 (July) Parliamentary General Election ===
Candidate	Party	Symbol	Votes	%
W. A. Karunasena	Sri Lanka Freedom Party	Hand	8,390	55.57
E. C. J. Atukorale	United National Party	Elephant	5,369	35.56
M. P. Jothipala	Mahajana Eksath Peramuna	Cartwheel	1,254	8.31
Valid Votes			15,013	99.44
Rejected Votes			85	0.56
Total Polled			15,098	100.00
Registered Electors			19,384	
Turnout				77.89

=== 1965 Parliamentary General Election ===
Candidate	Party	Symbol	Votes	%
W. A. Karunasena	Sri Lanka Freedom Party	Hand	11,917	56.24
Seetha Seneviratne	United National Party	Elephant	8,577	40.48
M. P. Jothipala	Mahajana Eksath Peramuna	Cartwheel	522	2.46
P. H. K. A. Ranansinghe		Sun	97	0.46
Valid Votes			21,113	99.65
Rejected Votes			75	0.35
Total Polled			21,188	100.00
Registered Electors			24,729	
Turnout				85.68

=== 1970 Parliamentary General Election ===
Candidate	Party	Symbol	Votes	%
Dharmadasa Wanniarachchi	Sri Lanka Freedom Party	Hand	15,544	61.65
P. Pelendagama	United National Party	Elephant	9,571	37.96
Valid Votes			25,115	99.60
Rejected Votes			100	0.40
Total Polled			25,215	100.00
Registered Electors			28,970	
Turnout				87.04

=== 1977 Parliamentary General Election ===
Candidate	Party	Symbol	Votes	%
Chandrasekera Gankanda	United National Party	Elephant	15,233	53.16
Dharmadasa Wanniarachchi	Sri Lanka Freedom Party	Hand	12,676	44.24
H. K. Chandradasa		Key	552	1.93
W. M. Lesley Perera		Bell	63	0.22
Valid Votes			28,524	99.55
Rejected Votes			129	0.45
Total Polled			28,653	100.00
Registered Electors			32,200	
Turnout				88.98
