= Wariyapola Sri Sumangala =

Sri Lankan Buddhist monk and National Hero

Wariyapola Sri Sumangala Thero
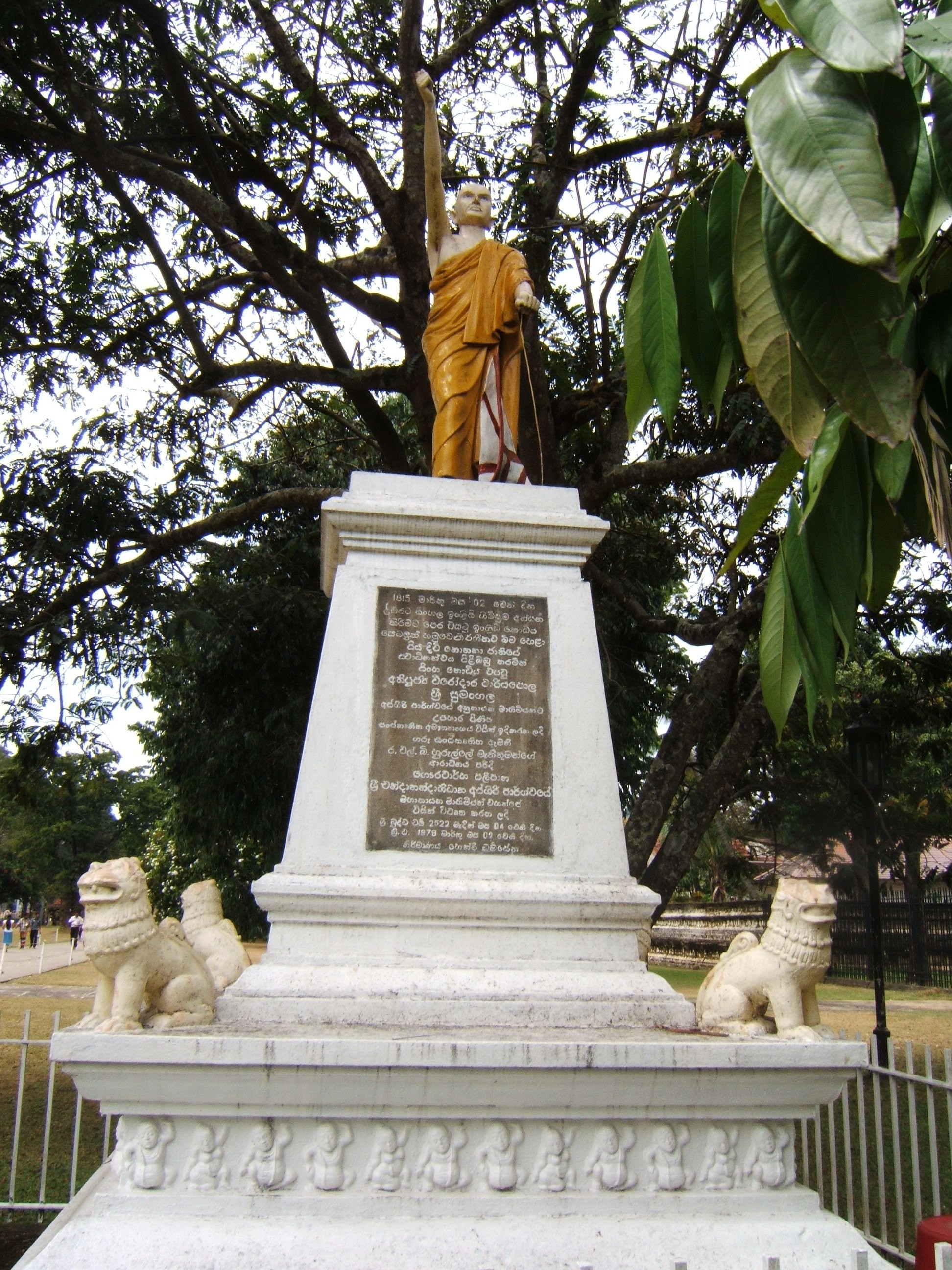
- Statue of Sri Sumangala
- Title: Anunayaka (Asgiriya Chapter)

Personal life
- Born: Wariyapola, Sri Lanka

Religious life
- Religion: Buddhism
- School: Theravada
- Lineage: Siam Sect

Wariyapola Sri Sumangala (Sinhala:වාරියපොල ශ්‍රි සුමංගල) was a Buddhist monk who lived in the early 19th century in Sri Lanka (then known as Ceylon). He was an Anunayaka of the Asgiriya Chapter. Sri Sumangala is known for taking down the Union Jack and re-hoisting the Sinhalese lion flag, before the convention that handed over control of the island to the British in 1815. Later during the rebellion of 1818, he removed the Tooth Relic of the Buddha from the Temple of the Tooth, and handed it over to the leaders of the rebellion. He was arrested and convicted for treason the same year.

== Personal life ==
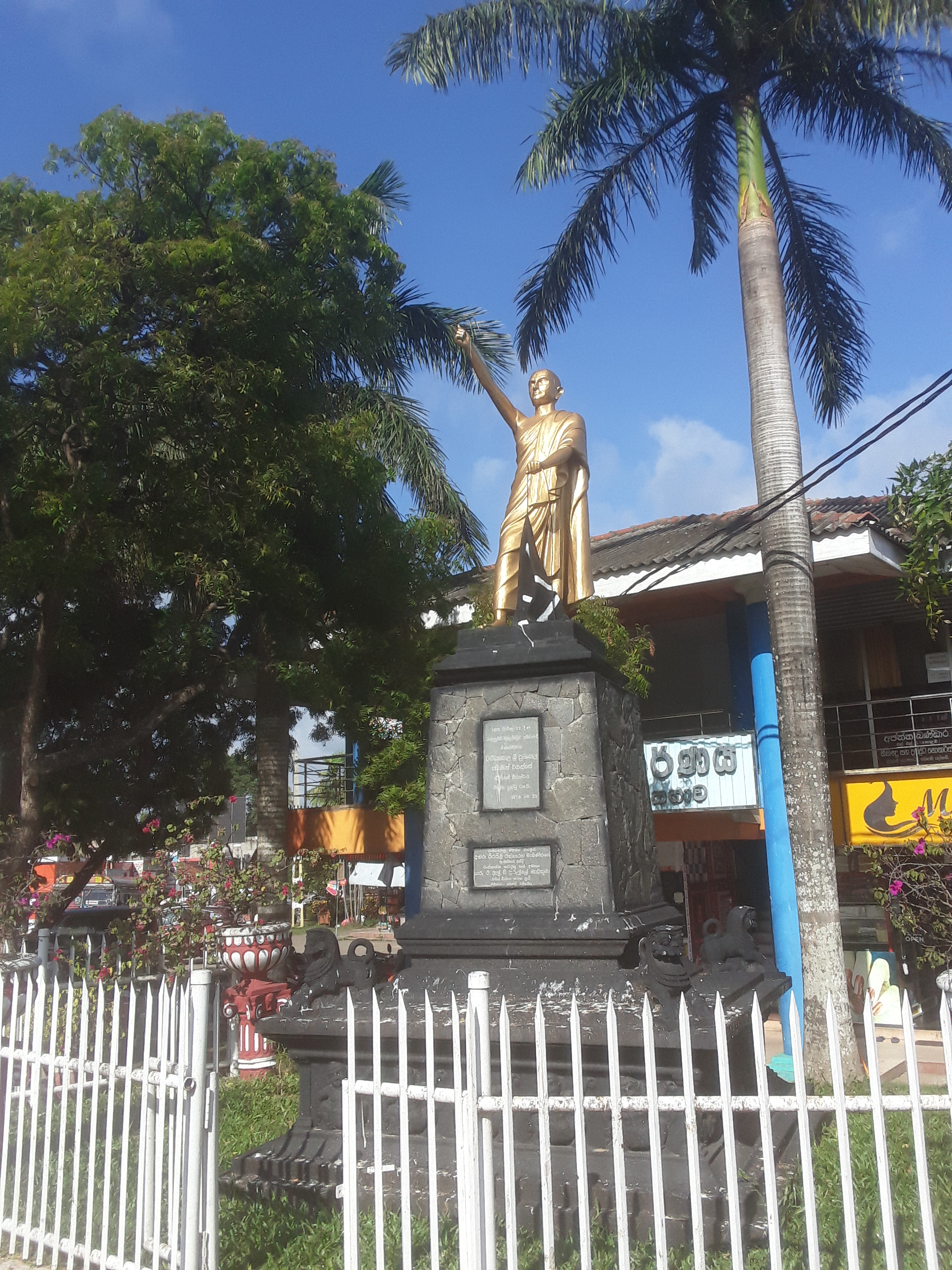
Statue of Most Ven Wariyapola Thera at Wariyapola Town.

Sri Sumangala Thero was born as Bamunakotuwe Ralahamige Kirihami, in Bamunakotuwa (village of Wariyapola)in the Kurunegala district. His father's name was Herath Mudiyanselage Bamunakotuve Rala. Kirihami was ordained as a Buddhist monk in the Asgiriya Chapter of the Siam Nikaya by a monk named Navinne Dhammadassi, and named Wariyapola Sri Sumangala (Sri Sumangala of Wariyapola). He later obtained Upasampada as well. He quickly rose through the hierarchy of the Nikaya, and was eventually appointed an anunayaka—a sub-chief monk second to the mahanayaka— of the Asgiriya Chapter. He was the chief monk of the Sailathalaarama in Wariyapola, now named after him as Sri Sumangala Pirivena Raja Maha Viharaya.

== 1815 convention ==
The flag of King Sri Vikrama Rajasinha of Kandy

In 1815, Sinhalese leaders drew up the Kandyan Convention with the British, handing over control of the kingdom to them. On the day this agreement was to be signed (2 March 1815) at the Temple of the Tooth, a British soldier had taken down the Sinhalese flag and hoisted the Union Jack. Sri Sumangala had taken it down and raised the Sinhalese flag again, declaring that until the convention was signed the country still belonged to the Sinhalese and their flag will fly until that time. This "Sinhalese flag" is believed to be the lion flag used by the last rulers of the country, and this event is mentioned in the books recording the history of the Asgiriya Chapter.

== 1818 rebellion ==
In 1818, a rebellion started in the uplands of the country against the British rule. With the outbreak of this rebellion, Sri Sumangala removed the Relic of the tooth of Buddha from the Temple of the Tooth in Kandy, and went into hiding in Hanguranketa. He later handed it over to Keppetipola Disawe, who was leading the rebellion. The possession of the Tooth Relic was traditionally regarded as a symbol of the right to rule the country, and the acquisition of it was a large morale boost to the rebels, who intensified their activities after that. However, the British captured Sri Sumangala in November 1818 and recovered the Tooth Relic, which they ceremonially brought into Kandy again. The rebellion ended soon after this. Sri Sumangala was convicted for treason and imprisoned in Jaffna. Some accounts say that he was released on 13 April 1821 by order of the then Governor of Ceylon.

== Legacy ==
A ceremony was convened on 1 March 2024 at the Maha Maluwa within the Royal Palace Complex of Kandy to commemorate the 209th anniversary of the incident wherein Sri Sumangala Thero, in an act of defiance against the British, protested the hoisting of the Union Jack prior to the signing of the Kandyan Convention.
