= List of governors of Sabaragamuwa Province =

Governor of Sabaragamuwa
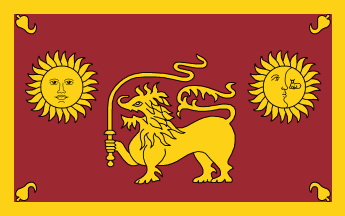
- Flag of Sabaragamuwa
- Incumbent; Champa Janaki Rajaratne since 25 September 2024
- Appointer: President of Sri Lanka
- Term length: 5 years
- Inaugural holder: Noel Wimalasena
- Formation: 30 April 1988
- Website: sg.gov.lk

The governor of Sabaragamuwa, Sri Lanka (Sinhala: සබරගමුව පළාත් ආණ්ඩුකාරවරයා Sabaragamuva palāth āndukāravarayā), is responsible for the management of the Sabaragamuwa Provincial Council. Some of the office's key functions include exercising powers vested in the governor by the Provincial Council Act No. 42 of 1987 amended by Act No. 28 of 1990 and the 13th Amendment to the Constitution.

== Governors ==
Independent Sri Lanka Freedom Party United National Party

No.	Name	Portrait	Party	Took office	Left office	Refs
1	Noel Wimalasena		United National Party	30 April 1988	1993	
2	C. N. Saliya Mathew		United National Party	1993	9 June 2005	
3	Reggie Ranatunga		Sri Lanka Freedom Party	9 June 2005	February 2008	
4	Dickson Sarathchandra Dela		Independent	22 February 2008	2 October 2008	
5	Mohan Saliya Ellawala		Sri Lanka Freedom Party	2 October 2008	12 May 2009	
6	Alavi Moulana (acting)		Sri Lanka Freedom Party	13 May 2009	5 July 2009	
7	Janaka Priyantha Bandara		Sri Lanka Freedom Party	5 July 2009	21 April 2010	
8	W. J. M. Lokubandara		United National Party	21 April 2010	27 January 2015	
9	Marshal Perera		Independent	27 January 2015	11 April 2018	
10	Niluka Ekanayake		Independent	12 April 2018	2 January 2019	
11	Dhamma Dissanayake		Independent	3 January 2019	20 December 2019	
12	Tikiri Kobbekaduwa		Independent	21 December 2019	10 June 2023	
13	Navin Dissanayake		United National Party	13 June 2023	23 September 2024	
14	Champa Janaki Rajaratne		Independent	25 September 2024	Present	

== See also ==
- Chief minister (Sri Lanka)
