= Consortium of Humanitarian Agencies =

The Consortium of Humanitarian Agencies (CHA) was established in Sri Lanka in April 1997 to serve a membership and has since become a national service provider in the non-profit sector. CHA's field offices are located in 12 districts in the North, South and East in Sri Lanka. In addition its post-tsunami information management centres are located in all affected districts of the 2004 Indian Ocean earthquake and tsunami.

== General profile ==
CHA represents the resources and work of the humanitarian sector in Sri Lanka. CHA's membership supports and intervenes in the sector across all parts of the country.

CHA is served by a Staff of 153 including professionals with managerial and representational authority, headed by Executive Director Jeevan Thiagarajah.

== Main objectives ==
- 1. Advocate for peace, human rights and development with specific focus on diversity, fundamental rights and freedom
- 2. Share the Knowledge and skills particularly in the areas of information gathering, processing and dissemination
- 3. Facilitate to network the national and international organizations and their resources
- 4. Assist in post-Tsunami interventions.
