= Amara Piyaseeli Ratnayake =

Sri Lankan politician

Hon. Amara Piyaseeli Ratnayake

9th Governor of North Western Province
- In office 23 January 2015 – 11 April 2018
- President: Maithripala Sirisena
- Preceded by: Tissa Balalla
- Succeeded by: K. C. Logeswaran

Minister of Women’s Affairs
- In office 2001–2004

Member of Parliament for Kurunegala District
- In office 1977–2010

Personal details
- Party: United National Party
- Other political affiliations: United National Front
- Children: 2
- Occupation: Politician
- Profession: Teacher

Ratnayake Mudiyanselage Amara Piyaseeli Ratnayake (born 13 March 1938) is a Sri Lankan politician and was the 9th Governor of the North Western Province. She was a former member of the Parliament of Sri Lanka and a former government minister, being the Minister of Woman's affairs in the 2001-2004 United National Party government. She is a longstanding MP of the United National Party for the Wariyapola Electorate. She entered politics from Kurunegala after her husband's assassination who was a prominent wealthy businessman.

She is now retired from politics. Her son Manjula a former provincial council member serves as the chief organiser under the United National Party to Wariyapola Electoral division.

Political offices
Preceded by Tissa Balalla	Governor of the North Western Province; 2015–2018	Succeeded by K. C. Logeswaran
