= Wasantha Karannagoda =

Sri Lankan Admiral

Admiral of the Fleet Wasantha Karannagoda
- Wasantha Karannagoda
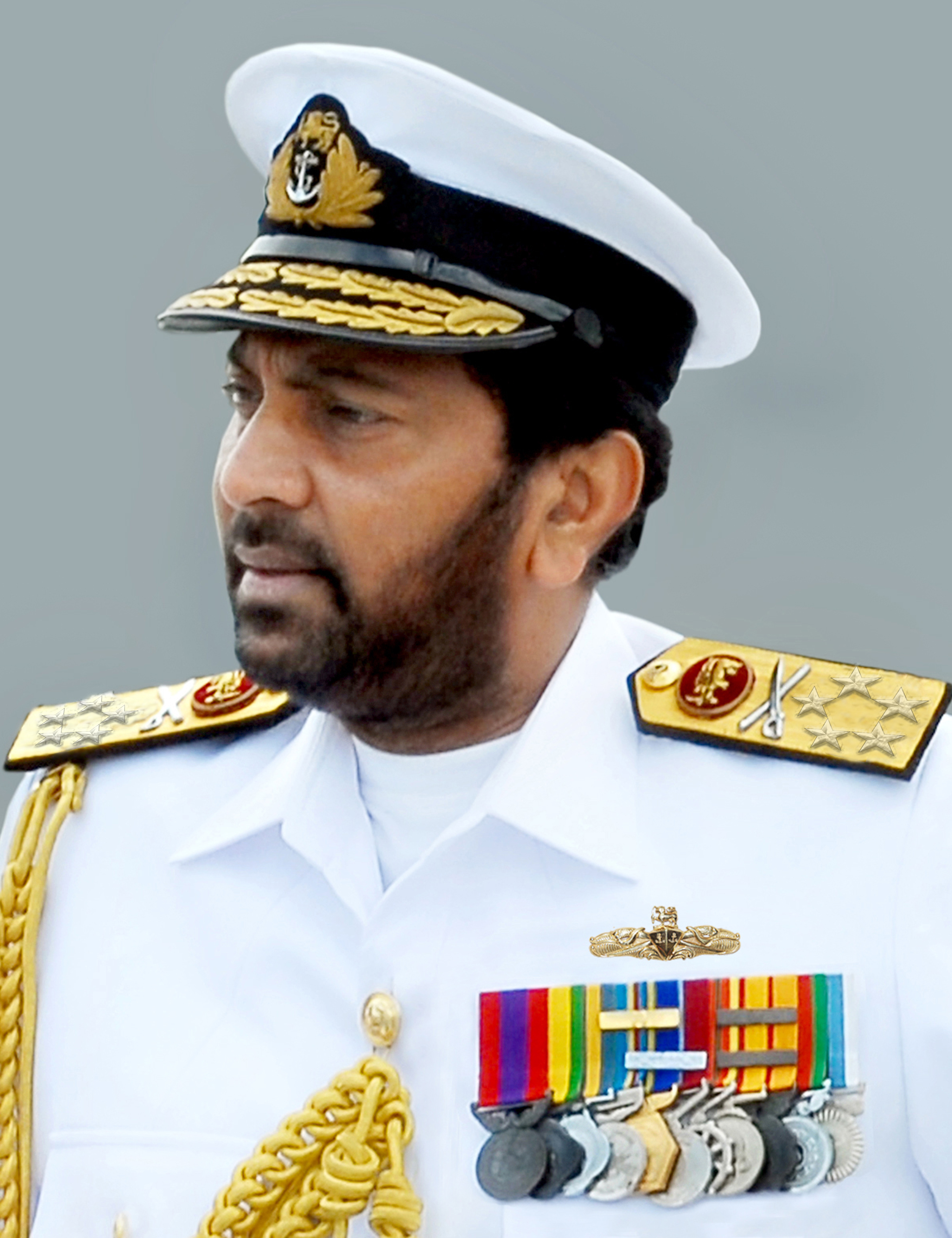
- Wasantha Karannagoda
- Born: November 22, 1952 (age 73)
- Alma mater: Ananda College
- Military career
- Allegiance: Sri Lanka
- Branch: Sri Lanka Navy
- Service years: 1971–2009; 2009–Present
- Rank: Admiral of the Fleet
- Service number: NRX 0046
- Unit: 7th Surveillance Command Squadron
- Commands: Commander of the Sri Lankan Navy
- Conflicts: Sri Lankan Civil War
- Awards: Rana Sura Padakkama; Vishista Seva Vibhushanaya; Uttama Seva Padakkama
- Other work: Ambassador to Japan, Advisor to the President on National security

Admiral of the Fleet Wasantha Kumar Jayadeva Karannagoda, RSP, VSV, USP, MRIN, MNI (born November 22, 1952) is a Sri Lankan naval officer. He served as the Commander of the Sri Lankan Navy during the last phase of the Sri Lankan Civil War and Governor of North Western Province, Sri Lanka from 2021 to 2023.

Karannagoda commanded fast gun boats of the 7th Surveillance Command Squadron, before achieving higher command in the Navy and serving as the Commander of the Navy during the final stage of the Sri Lankan Civil War that saw the military defeat of the LTTE. Under his command the Sri Lanka Navy was able to intercept and sink over ten arms shipments of the LTTE on high seas in the Indian Ocean.

Following the war, Karannagoda retired from the navy and went on to hold several political appointments that included Secretary to the Ministry of Highways, Ambassador to Japan and was promoted to the rank of Admiral of the Fleet. He supported Gotabaya Rajapaksa's presidential campaign and was appointed Governor of North Western Province in 2021 by President Rajapaksa.

== Early life and education ==
Born to Mr and Mrs D. S. Karannagoda, he was educated at Ananda College, where he was contemporaries of Sarath Fonseka and Gotabaya Rajapaksa.

== Naval career ==
=== Early career ===
After completing his schooling, Karannagoda joined the Royal Ceylon Navy as an Officer Cadet on 1 August 1971 in the months following the 1971 JVP insurrection. Following is basic officer training at the Naval and Maritime Academy and completing the sub lieutenant technical course at the Indian Naval Academy gaining a first class; he was commissioned as a Sub Lieutenant on 1 February 1974. Specializing as a navigations officer in the executive branch, he followed a navigation specialization course in India from 1979 to 1980. He then served as Flag Lieutenant to Commander of the Navy, Admiral Basil Gunasekara. In 1987, Lieutenant Commander Karannagoda attended the naval command and staff course at the Royal Naval College, Greenwich. Following several at see and shore appointments, he went on to command SLNS Wickrama and then served as Commander, 7th Surveillance Command Squadron.

=== Higher command ===
Karannagoda had served as the Commandant of the Naval and Maritime Academy, Deputy Area Commander (West), Deputy Area Commander (North) and Deputy Area Commander (East). Promoted to Commodore in 1996, he served as Director Naval Operations, Director Naval Projects and Plans as well as Director Naval Personnel and Training. He gained a Master of Business Administration from the University of Colombo in 1996 and followed a course on International Relations, Law of the Sea and Energy Resources in the United States in 1997. Promoted to Rear Admiral in 1999, he attended the national defence course at the National Defence University, Islamabad from 1999 to 2000, gaining a Master’s in Defence and Strategic Studies from the Quaid-i-Azam University.

Rear Admiral Karannagoda served as the first Director General (Operations) at Naval Headquarters and then went on to command four naval commands, Northern, Eastern, Western and North Central Commands, be for appointment as Commander of the Navy with promotion to the rank of Vice Admiral on 1 September 2005. During his command, the Sri Lanka Navy, increased its deep-sea operations against LTTE arms shipments sinking over ten arms smuggling ships. With the military defeat of the LTTE in 2009, Karannagoda was promoted to the Admiral by President Mahinda Rajapakse. In 2009, he was invited to follow a course on Regional Security Studies at the National Defense University in Washington, DC.

== Later life ==
Following his retirement from the navy in 2009, he was appointed Secretary to the Ministry of Highways. He was thereafter appointed Sri Lankan Ambassador to Japan in 2011, serving till 2015.

=== Admiral of the Fleet ===
Karannagoda was promoted to the honorary rank of Admiral of the Fleet by President Maithripala Sirisena on 19 September 2019 for his service as the Commander of the Navy during the final stage of the Sri Lankan Civil War. He is the first and to-date the only person to hold the rank and second person to be appointed to a Five star rank in Sri Lanka. On promotion to the newly created rank, he was a restored to active service. The appointment coincided with the promotion of Air Chief Marshal Roshan Goonetileke to the newly created rank of Marshal of the Sri Lanka Air Force. Both promotions had been heavily lobbied for following the promotion of the General Sarath Fonseka to the newly created rank of Field Marshal in 2015.

=== Governor of North Western Province ===
On 9 December 2021, he was appointed as the Governor of the North Western Province by President Gotabaya Rajapaksa. In February 2023, he chaired a board of inquiry into the role of the Sri Lankan Armed Forces during the 2022 Sri Lankan protests in May 2023, which found General Shavendra Silva willful neglected his duty that resulted in island-wide violence since the army did not intervene. On 26 April 2023, the U.S. Department of State sanctioned Karannagoda and his wife and banned them from entering the U.S. over credible allegations of human rights violations during the civil war. He is one of the accused in the abduction and killing of 11 mostly Tamil youths between late 2008 and mid 2009. Onn 17 May 2023, President Ranil Wickramasinghe removed three provincial governors including Karannagoda.

== Controversies ==
=== Allegations of war crimes and sanctions ===
Following submissions by International Truth and Justice Project, in March 2025, the Government of the United Kingdom imposed travel sanctions, former Commander of the Army Shavendra Silva and Jagath Jayasuriya, former Commander of the Navy Wasantha Karannagoda and ex-LTTE Vinayagamoorthy Muralitharan, aka Karuna Amman as part of what the Foreign office called "UK travel bans and asset freezes, target individuals responsible for a range of violations and abuses, such as extrajudicial killings, during the civil war".

The Ministry of Foreign Affairs said that this was a unilateral action taken by the UK government and such action does not assist but serve to complicate the national reconciliation process underway in Sri Lanka and went on to say human rights violations in the past need to handle by domestic accountability mechanisms. The Wartime President Mahinda Rajapaksa rejected UK governments allegations of human rights violations, stating "We waged war only against the LTTE and not against the Tamil people". Karannagoda had responded accusing the UK government of hypocrisy, claiming that it failed to address atrocities during British colonial rule in India and Sri Lanka as well as the UK government's silence in the ongoing conflicts in Gaza, Syria, Afghanistan, and Libya. He claimed that that LTTE sympathizers are active in the UK, the US, Canada, Australia, and Europe attempting to establish a separate state in Sri Lanka by collecting funds to influence politicians in these countries to "impose sanctions on Sri Lankan military leaders who played a key role in defeating the LTTE". He accused the British Prime Minister, a former human rights lawyer using this issue to gain votes. He also urged the Sri Lankan government to stand by its military leaders and be firm against such sanctions.

=== Allegations of corruption ===
On 3 July 2026, Karannagoda was arrested by the Commission to Investigate Allegations of Bribery or Corruption (CIABOC) on charges of corruption in connection with an ongoing investigation into the recruitment of Yoshitha Rajapaksa into the Sri Lanka Navy without proper documentation in 2006. He was subsequently granted bail by the Colombo Chief Magistrate's Court on the same date.

== Honors ==
Karannagoda had been awarded the Rana Sura Padakkama (RSP) for gallantry in combat; the service medals the Vishista Seva Vibhushanaya (VSV) and the Uttama Seva Padakkama (USP) for distinguished service, the Sri Lanka Armed Services Long Service Medal with clasp, the Purna Bhumi Padakkama and the North and East Operations Medal with two clasps; the campaign medal the Riviresa Campaign Services Medal and the commemorative medals the Sri Lanka Navy 50th Anniversary Medal with clasp, the President's Inauguration Medal and the 50th Independence Anniversary Commemoration Medal. He had gained the Surface Warfare Badge and the Commendation Badge.

In 2009, he was conferred an honorary doctorate by the University of Kelaniya.

== See also ==
- Sarath Fonseka
- Roshan Goonetileke
- List of Sri Lankan non-career diplomats
- List of Sri Lankan non-career Permanent Secretaries

Military offices
Preceded by Daya Sandagiri	Commander of the Sri Lankan Navy; 2005–2009	Succeeded by Thisara Samarasinghe
Political offices
Preceded by Raja Collure	Governor of the North Western Province; 9 December 2021–15 May 2023	Succeeded by Lakshman Yapa Abeywardena
