= Faiszer Musthapha =

Sri Lankan politician

Hon. Faiszer Musthapha MP PC

Minister of Sports
- In office 12 April 2018 – 26 October 2018
- President: Maithripala Sirisena
- Prime Minister: Ranil Wickremesinghe
- Preceded by: Dayasiri Jayasekara

Minister of Local Government and Provincial Councils
- In office 9 September 2015 – 26 October 2018
- President: Maithripala Sirisena
- Prime Minister: Ranil Wickremesinghe
- Preceded by: A. L. M. Athaullah

State Minister of Aviation
- In office 12 January 2015 – 9 February 2015
- President: Maithripala Sirisena
- Prime Minister: Ranil Wickremesinghe

Deputy Minister of Investment Promotion
- In office 2012–2014

Deputy Minister of Technology and Research
- In office 2010–2012

Deputy Minister of Environment
- In office 2010–2012

Deputy Minister of Tourism
- In office 2007–2010

Member of Parliament for National List
- In office 2015–2020

Member of Parliament for Kandy District
- In office 2004–2015

Personal details
- Born: 2 July 1969 (age 57)
- Party: Sri Lanka Freedom Party; Ceylon Workers' Congress
- Other political affiliations: United People's Freedom Alliance
- Parent: Faisz Musthapha (father)
- Education: Royal College Colombo
- Profession: Attorney-at-Law

Mohamed Faiszer Musthapha, PC, MP is a Sri Lankan lawyer and politician. He was the Minister of Sports and Provincial Councils and Local Government and a member of the Parliament of Sri Lanka. Faiszer Musthapha is married to Fathima Rifa who is also a lawyer. They have two daughters.

== Education ==
Musthapha received his primary and secondary education at Royal College, Colombo and graduated from the Ceylon Law College. He obtained his post-graduate degree, Master of Law (LLM) from the University of Aberdeen, U.K.

== Legal career ==
Faiszer Musthapha chose the legal profession as his career following in the footsteps of his father Faisz Musthapha. Faiszer Musthapha had specialized in company law and established a very successful practice eventually earning the title of President's Counsel. It was the first time in the history of Sri Lanka that both a father and son had attained the title of President's Counsel. He also held the position of Vice Chairman of Sri Lanka Land Reclamation and Development Corporation (SLLRDC) 2002-2003 and subsequently, Vice Chairman of National Housing Development Authority (NHDA) 2002–2004.

== Political career ==
Musthapha entered politics as a member of the Ceylon Workers' Congress (CWC) in 2004 and was elected as a Member of Parliament the same year, representing the Kandy District. Following the elections, the CWC announced its unconditional support to the United People's Freedom Alliance (UPFA), thereby allowing the UPFA to form a government.

In the subsequent parliamentary elections in 2010, Musthapha contested for reelection as a member of the Sri Lanka Freedom Party (SLFP). With Faiszer as its candidate, the SLFP was able to achieve Muslim representation in Parliament from the Central Province for the first time in 54 years. He was then appointed a Central Committee member of the SLFP, a position he continues to hold.

In 2005, he was appointed as the Deputy Minister of Tourism and later functioned as the Minister of Tourism Promotion (non-cabinet), the Deputy Minister of Environment, the Deputy Minister of Technology and Research and thereafter as the Deputy Minister of Investment Promotion.

As the Deputy Minister of Environment, in April 2010, the Hon. Faiszer Musthapha led the Sri Lankan delegation to the 34th session of the World Heritage Committee held in Brasília, Brazil, where he played a key role in convincing the members of the World Heritage Committee to approve the inscription of Horton Plains, Knuckles Conservative Forest and Peak Wilderness (forest area around Sri-Pada) as World Heritage Sites.

He had previously served as a member of the Cabinet sub-committee appointed to look into and identify Laws and Regulations Obstructing Investments and as a Member of the Committee on Public Enterprises (COPE).

He was one of many SLFP MPs who crossed over to the opposition in support of Maithripala Sirisena to campaign against former President Mahinda Rajapaksa in the 2015 presidential election, which would be won by Sirisena. In the cabinet reshuffle that followed, Mustapha was appointed as State Minister of Aviation from which he resigned barely a month later. Soon after, he was appointed as Legal Advisor to President Maithripala Sirisena.

Following the 2015 parliamentary elections, Faiszer Musthapha entered Parliament through the National List and was appointed Cabinet Minister of Provincial Councils and Local Government. He was also a member of the Public Accounts Committee among several Parliamentary Consultative Committees.

=== Controversy ===
Following his appointment as Minister of Provincial Councils and Local Government, Musthapha identified numerous flaws in the Delimitation Report, which was to be the basis on which the forthcoming local government elections were to be conducted according to the Local Authorities (Amendment) Act 2012. He postponed the local government elections indefinitely until the delimitation report was rectified, although it was beyond the legally permitted term. He defended his decision stating that the original delimitation report was designed to the whims and fancies of the previous government and would have resulted in a mockery of the democratic process if remedial action was not taken. However, this decision received much criticism from citizens and politicians alike.
