= Jeevan Thiagarajah =

Current governor of the Northern Province, Sri Lanka

- ஜீவன் தியாகராஜா

8th Governor of the Northern Province
- In office 11 October 2021 – 15 May 2023
- President: Gotabaya Rajapaksa; Ranil Wickremesinghe
- Preceded by: P. S. M. Charles
- Succeeded by: P. S. M. Charles

Personal details
- Party: Independent
- Occupation: Civil servant
- Ethnicity: Sri Lankan Tamil

Jeevan Thiagarajah (Tamil: ஜீவன் தியாகராஜா) is a Sri Lankan Tamil civil servant, human rights activist, and social activist who also served as Governor of the Northern Province from 2021 to 2023.

== Career ==
Thiagarajah has worked in the NGO sector of Sri Lanka since 1984, holding executive positions in several humanitarian and human rights organizations. He served as the chairman of the Institute for Human Rights, a Sri Lankan NGO, and also served as Executive Director of the Consortium of Humanitarian Agencies. In December 2020, he was appointed as a member of the Election Commission of Sri Lanka.

In October 2021, Thiagarajah resigned from his position in the Election Commission to take up the post of Northern Province Governor. He was sworn in as Governor of the Northern Province on 11 October 2021.
