= Akila Ellawala =

Sri Lankan politician (born 1976)

Hon. Akila Ellawala
- අකිල එල්ලාවල அகிலா எல்லவாலா

Member of the Parliament of Sri Lanka
- Incumbent
- Assumed office 2020
- Constituency: Ratnapura District

Member of the Sabaragamuwa Provincial Council
- In office 2012–2017
- Constituency: Ratnapura District

Personal details
- Born: Akila Saliya Ellawala; 6 January 1976 (age 50)
- Party: Sri Lanka Podujana Peramuna
- Other political affiliations: Sri Lanka People's Freedom Alliance

Akila Saliya Ellawala (born 6 January 1976) is a Sri Lankan politician, former provincial councillor and Member of Parliament.

Ellawala was born on 6 January 1976. He is the son of Mohan Ellawala, former Chief Minister of Sabaragamuwa Province. He has a Bachelor of Commerce, Specialised in Human Resources Management and Marketing from Deakin University, Melbourne, Australia. He was the Sri Lanka Freedom Party's organiser for Ratnapura District and vice-chairman of the state-owned State Engineering Corporation of Sri Lanka.

Ellawala was a member of the Sabaragamuwa Provincial Council. He contested the 2015 parliamentary election as one of the United People's Freedom Alliance (UPFA) electoral alliance's candidates in Ratnapura District but failed to get elected after coming 9th amongst the UPFA candidates. He contested the 2020 parliamentary election as a Sri Lanka People's Freedom Alliance electoral alliance candidate in Ratnapura District and was elected to the Parliament of Sri Lanka.

Electoral history of Akila Ellawala
Election	Constituency	Party	Alliance	Votes	Result
2012 provincial	Ratnapura District	Sri Lanka Freedom Party	United People's Freedom Alliance	35,807	Elected
2015 parliamentary	Ratnapura District	Sri Lanka Freedom Party	United People's Freedom Alliance	40,178	Not elected
2020 parliamentary	Ratnapura District	Sri Lanka Podujana Peramuna	Sri Lanka People's Freedom Alliance	71,179	Elected
