= Faisz Musthapha =

Faisz Musthapha PC

Sri Lankan High Commissioner to the United Kingdom
- In office April 2002 – February 2005
- Preceded by: Mangala Moonesinghe
- Succeeded by: Kshenuka Senewiratne

Personal details
- Education: University of Ceylon
- Profession: Lawyer

Faisz Musthapha is a Sri Lankan lawyer and diplomat.

== Early life and family ==
Musthapha is the son of S. M. Musthapha, a leading lawyer who practised in Kandy. He was educated at the University of Ceylon.

Musthapha is married to Ameena (Fathima). Their son Faiszer is a lawyer and government minister whilst their daughter Faisza is also a lawyer.

== Career ==
Musthapha has been practising law since the mid-1960s and is a President's Counsel. He served as chairman of the Human Rights Commission of Sri Lanka from 2000 to 2003.

Musthapha served as Sri Lanka's High Commissioner to the United Kingdom from April 2002 to February 2005.

== See also ==
- Sri Lankan Non Career Diplomats
