= Mohan Ellawala =

Sri Lankan politician

Honourable Mohan Ellawala

5th Governor of Sabaragamuwa
- In office 2 October 2008 – 12 May 2009
- Preceded by: Dickson Sarathchandra Dela
- Succeeded by: Janaka Priyantha Bandara

7th Chief Minister of Sabaragamuwa
- In office 13 December 2001 – 16 July 2004
- Preceded by: Asoka Jayawardena
- Succeeded by: Maheepala Herath

Personal details
- Born: Mohan Saliya Ellawala; 9 November 1948
- Died: 12 May 2009 (aged 60) Colombo, Sri Lanka
- Party: Sri Lanka Freedom Party
- Spouse: Chandanee née Kulathilaka
- Relations: Robert Sydney (father), Clarice Mallika née Kobbekaduwa (mother), Nanda Sydney (brother)
- Children: Akila Ellawala(in Parliament since 2020)
- Occupation: politician

Mohan Saliya Ellawala (9 November 1948 – 12 May 2009) was the fifth governor of Sabaragamuwa Province in Sri Lanka from 2 October 2008, until his death in May 2009. He had previously been the seventh Chief Minister of Sabaragamuwa serving from 13 December 2001, until 16 July 2004.

In 1972 Ellawala became the private secretary to Hector Kobbekaduwa (Minister for Agriculture and Lands). In 1991 he was appointed the chief Sri Lanka Freedom Party organiser for the Balangoda Electoral District, and in the same year was elected as councillor on the Balangoda Urban Council, though he resigned from the position on 7 April 1993. In 1993 he was elected to the Sabaragamuwa Provincial Council, becoming the chairman of the Council between 17 June 1999 and 8 November 2000. In 2001 he was appointed the Provincial Minister of Local Government, Cooperatives, Housing, Highways, Power and Energy and in December that year the Chief Minister of Sabaragamuwa, a position that he retained until 16 July 2004. On 2 October 2008 President Mahinda Rajapaksa appointed Ellawala as the fifth Governor of Sabaragamuwa Province, a position he retained until his death on 12 May 2009.

Political offices
Preceded by Dickson Sarathchandra Dela	Governor of Sabaragamuwa; 2008–2009	Succeeded by Alavi Moulana (as Acting Governor)
