= Dickson Sarathchandra Dela =

Sri Lankan provincial governor

Hon. Dickson Sarathchandra Dela

Sri Lankan High Commissioner to the Maldives
- In office 12 July 2009 – 2015
- President: Mahinda Rajapaksa

2nd Governor of Northern Province
- In office 10 October 2008 – 12 July 2009
- Preceded by: Victor Perera
- Succeeded by: G. A. Chandrasiri

4th Governor of Sabaragamuwa
- In office 22 February 2008 – 2 October 2008
- Preceded by: Reggie Ranatunga
- Succeeded by: Mohan Ellawala

W. W. M. R. Dickson Sarathchandra Dela is a former Provincial governor and former Sri Lankan High Commissioner to the Maldives. Dela has held the offices of the Governor of Northern Province and of Sabaragamuwa. He is the father of Pradeep Nilanga Dela, the Diyawadana Nilame.

== Political career ==
Dickson Sarathchandra Dela was sworn in as Governor of Sabaragamuwa, by President Mahinda Rajapaksa, on 22 February 2008 which held until October of the same year. Leaving the governorship of Sabaragamuwa he became the Governor of Northern Province for a further nine months resigning to take over as the Sri Lankan High Commissioner to the Maldives in 2009 & which held until 2015.

Political offices
Preceded by Victor Perera	Governor of Northern Province; 2008–2009	Succeeded by G. A. Chandrasiri
Preceded by Reggie Ranatunga	Governor of Sabaragamuwa; 2008	Succeeded by Mohan Ellawala
Diplomatic posts
Preceded by ?	Sri Lankan High Commissioner to the Maldives; 2009 – Present	Incumbent
