= Infectious Disease Hospital =

Infectious Disease Hospital (IDH)
- Ministry of Health, Sri Lanka
- Sri Lanka Colombo District

Geography
- Location: Mandavila Rd, Kotikawatta, Angoda, Sri Lanka
- Coordinates: 6°55′21″N 79°55′05″E

Organisation
- Care system: Public
- Type: Infectious Disease

Services
- Emergency department: Yes
- Beds: 300 (estimate)

Links
- Website: www.health.gov.lk

The National Institute of Infectious Diseases, formerly known as the Infectious Disease Hospital (Angoda Fever Hospital), is a government hospital in Angoda, Sri Lanka.
