= Governor (Sri Lanka) =

Government representative

A Governor of a Province in Sri Lanka, is the head of the provincial council and representative of the President of Sri Lanka in the province. Established in 1987, under the 13th Amendment to the Constitution of Sri Lanka and deriving its powers from the Provincial Council Act No 47 of 1987, a governor exercises executive power in respect of subjects devolved to provincial council.

== Appointment ==
The Governor is appointed by the President for a period of five years and holds the position at the pleasure of the President.

== Powers ==
=== Provincial council powers ===
- Governor may address, summon, prorogue and dissolve the provincial council.
- Governor may appoint as Chief Minister, who would be the leader of the political party that commands the majority of the provincial council and the other four Ministers of the Board of Ministers.
- Governor may excises the functions of the provincial council in its absence.

=== Administrative powers ===
- Administration of the Provincial Council Fund and Emergency Fund of the Province.
- Administration of the Provincial Public Service.
- Administration of the Provincial finances.
- Obtaining Auditor General’s reports
- Appointment of Provincial Public Service Commission

== Privileges ==
A Provincial Governor is considered equal to a Cabinet Minister in rank and within his/her province the governor is placed after cabinet ministers and the leader of the opposition in the order of precedence.

=== Salary ===
As per the Provincial Councils (Payment of Salaries and Allowances) Act, No. 37 of 1988, the governor is entitled to monthly salary and allowances equal of a Minister of the Cabinet of Ministers.

=== Residence and office ===
The Governor is entitled to an official residence, as well as an office and personal staff allocated from the provincial council.

=== Travel ===
As with a Cabinet Minister, a Governor is entitled to three vehicles, which includes an official vehicle and security vehicle provided and maintained by the provincial council.

=== Security ===
Traditionally security for Governors have been provided by the Sri Lanka Police. During emergencies military units have been allocated to bolster security to certain Governors based on treat levels.

== Current governors ==
Current governors list
Province	Current Governor	Party	Terms Start	Terms End	Reference
Central	Harsha Suranga Fernando	Independent	5 August 2026	2031	
Eastern	Jayantha Lal Ratnasekara	Independent	25 September 2024	2029	
North Central	Wasantha Kumara Wimalasiri	Independent	25 September 2024	2029	
Northern	Nagalingam Vedanayagam	Independent	25 September 2024	2029	
North Western	Tissa Kumarasiri	Independent	25 September 2024	2029	
Sabaragamuwa	Champa Janaki Rajaratne	Independent	25 September 2024	2029	
Southern	Susiripala Manawadu	Independent	24 February 2026	2031	
Uva	Kapila Jayasekera	Independent	25 September 2024	2029	
Western	Hanif Yusuf	Independent	25 September 2024	2029	

== See also ==
- Chief Minister (Sri Lanka)
