= Tissa Kumarasiri =

Tissa Kumarasiri is the current governor of the North Western Province of Sri Lanka and a former secretary to the Ministry of Agriculture, Livestock, Land and Irrigation.
