= K. C. Logeswaran =

Sri Lankan civil servant

K. C. Logeswaran SLAS
- கே. சி. லோகேசுவரன்

10th Governor of North Western Province
- In office 12 April 2018 – 31 December 2018
- President: Maithripala Sirisena
- Preceded by: Amara Piyaseeli Ratnayake
- Succeeded by: Peshala Jayarathne

6th Governor of Western Province
- In office 23 January 2015 – 11 April 2018
- President: Maithripala Sirisena
- Preceded by: Alavi Moulana
- Succeeded by: Hemakumara Nanayakkara

Sri Lankan Ambassador to South Korea
- In office December 1999 – February 2003

Personal details
- Education: University of Ceylon
- Profession: Civil servant
- Ethnicity: Sri Lankan Tamil

Kanapathipillai Cathiravelpillai Logeswaran (Tamil: கணபதிப்பிள்ளை கதிரவேல்பிள்ளை லோகேசுவரன் Kaṇapatippiḷḷai Katiravēlpiḷḷai Lōkēcuvaraṉ) is a Sri Lankan civil servant. He was the 10th Governor of North Western Province having assumed office on 12 April 2018.

== Early life ==
Logeswaran is from Suthumalai. Logeswaran was educated at St. John's College, Jaffna. After school he joined the University of Ceylon from where he graduated with a Bachelor of Arts degree.

== Career ==
Logeswaran is an officer of the Sri Lanka Administrative Service (SLAS). He was Divisional Revenue Officer (DRO) in several divisions in Vavuniya District from 1963 to 1968. He was registrar of the University of Jaffna from April 1980 to September 1981. In October 1981 he was appointed District Secretary (Government Agent) for Vavuniya District, serving until July 1988. He then held senior positions at various government ministries: additional secretary at the Ministry of Rehabilitation and Reconstruction (August 1988 to March 1990); state secretary at the Ministry of Hindu Religious and Cultural Affairs (March 1990 to December 1990); secretary at the Project Ministry of Mineral Development (January 1991 to August 1994); additional secretary at the Ministry of Industrial Development (August 1994 to August 1995); and secretary at the Ministry of Posts, Telecommunications and the Media (September 1995 to August 1999). During the latter posting he was also chairman of the Telecommunications Regulatory Commission.

Logeswaran was appointed ambassador to South Korea in December 1999 and served until February 2003. He became an advisor to the Ministry of Finance in April 2003 and in December 2003 he joined the board of Sri Lanka Telecom. He was appointed to the Presidential Commission of Inquiry into serious human rights violations in November 2006 but resigned in April 2007. He was later secretary to the National Police Commission.

Newly elected President Maithripala Sirisena appointed Logeswaran Governor of Western Province on 23 January 2015. On 12 April 2018, he was sworn in as Governor of the North Western Province.

Political offices
Preceded by Amara Piyaseeli Ratnayake	Governor of the North Western Province; 2018	Succeeded by Peshala Jayarathne
Preceded by Alavi Moulana	Governor of Western Province; 2015–2018	Succeeded by Hemakumara Nanayakkara
