= Annesley Dias =

Sri Lankan actor and comedian (1927–2009)

Annesley Dias ඇනස්ලි ඩයස්
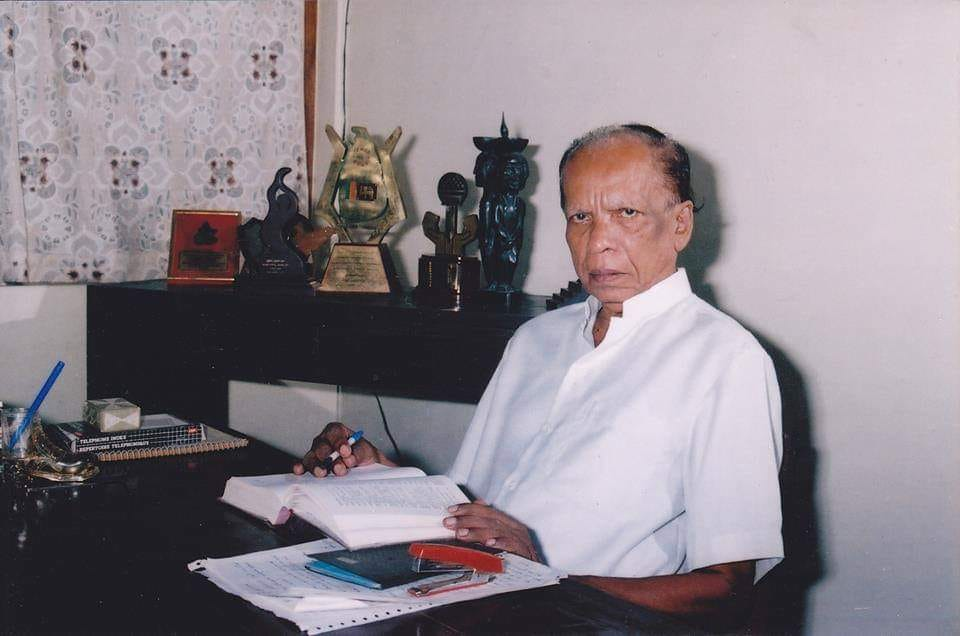
- Born: Muthukudu Arachchige Pedris Dias; January 31, 1927; Kelaniya, Sri Lanka
- Died: June 12, 2009 (aged 82); Kelaniya
- Education: St. Francis College; Saint Joseph's College, Colombo
- Occupations: Actor, Comedian, Teacher, Translator
- Years active: 1946–2000
- Spouse: Noelin Dias (m. 1957)
- Children: 6
- Mother: Anamaria Perera

Muthukudu Arachchige Pedris Dias (31 January 1927 – 12 June 2009 as ඇනස්ලි ඩයස්), popularly known as Annesley Dias, was an actor of Sri Lankan cinema and television as well as a comedian. He is best known for the role "Hamu Mahaththaya" in Vinoda Samaya television sitcom.

== Early life ==
Dias was born on 31 January 1927 as the youngest of the family. He had his primary education at St. Francis College, Dalugama and St. Paul's Waragoda College. He completed secondary education at Saint Joseph's College, Colombo in English medium. He studied pali and Sanskrit from the Vidyalankara Pirivena Kelaniya.

He started his career as an English teacher at Kelaniya Gurukula Vidyalaya. Then he worked at Moratuwa Municipal Council as a clerk. In 1984, he worked as the Public Relations Officer of the Colombo Municipal Development Authority. Later he joined the Official Language Department as a Grade I language translator at Colombo Municipal Council.

He was married to Noelin Dias. They started the relationship while Dias was teaching English at Gurukula Vidyalaya. The marriage was celebrated on October 16, 1957. The couple have two sons - Rajindra and Janak; and four daughters - Jayamali, Nilika, Manori and Samanthi Antonette. Their son Rajindra died suddenly of a heart attack.

Dias died on 12 June 2009 at the age of 81. Remains were kept at his residence at No. 378, Old Kandy Road, Kelaniya. His final rituals took place at Roman Catholic Cemetery in Dalugama on 17 June 2009.

His daughter Antonette was married to Jayantha Niel Wijeratna. Antonette worked as an accountant at the Rupavahini Corporation. Jayantha was an engineer. In August 2012, during a vacation in Canada, Jayantha and his 16 year of daughter Elisa Nimani died after a car accident on the QEW highway in Canada.

== Career ==
He started his acting career with a drama Ohoma Hindada? directed by W.B. Makuloluwa in 1946. He along with closest friends H D Wijedasa, Alfred Perera, Samuel Rodrigo and Berty Gunathilaka made the play Iskolayak. Then he joined Radio Ceylon under the guidance of Wijedasa, who worked as a relief announcer. They produced the radio play Vihilu Thahalu, where it was banned as it focused on condemning the politicians of the time.

After the ban, Dias along with Alfred discussed another comedy program, which marked the initiation of popular radio play Vinoda Samaya. The show became popular along with his fellow actors Berty Gunathilake and Samuel Rodrigo, where they were unofficially dubbed as Raja Thun Kattuwa. In 1982, this radio show was later telecasted as a TV show as well through Sri Lanka Rupavahini Corporation, running up to 240 episodes. Popular as Amaris Ayya, he is one of the most respected comedians and earned a lot of respect from leading politicians and leading Planters like Dinal Hilary Samaranayaka as well.

He published two books, Vinoda Samaye Hamu Mahattaya and Vinoda Samaya.

His maiden cinema acting came through 1968 film Abudassa Kale directed by Kumar Wickremasooriya. He acted in supporting role in the films such as Samaje Sathuro, Binaramali and Maruwa Samaga Wase.

He was also honored with the Lankathilaka Award from the Ministry of Culture of Sri Lanka. In 1994, he was honored with Sri Lanka Thilaka Award.

== Filmography ==
| Year | Film | Role | Ref. |
|---|---|---|---|
| 1968 | Abudassa Kale | | |
| 1968 | Samaje Sathuro | | |
| 1969 | Binaramalee | Loku Appuhamy | |
| 1970 | Lakseta Kodiya | Dance role giver | |
| 1977 | Maruwa Samaga Wase | Bus Conductor | |
| 1979 | Geheniyak | Stage Master | |
| 1981 | Kolamkarayo | Member Mahaththaya's assistant | |
| 1982 | Wathura Karaththaya | | |
| 1991 | Asai Bayai | | |
| 1993 | Ordinary Magic | Yoga Master | |
| 1995 | Deviyani Sathya Surakinna | Sergeant | |
| 2000 | Re Daniel Dawal Migel 2 | | |
