= List of governors of North Western Province =

Governor of North Western Province
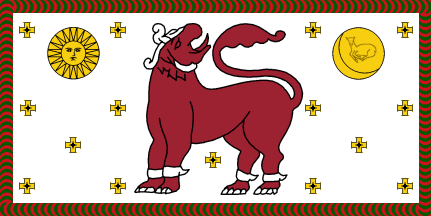
- Flag of North Western Province
- Incumbent; Tissa Kumarasiri since 25 September 2024
- Appointer: President of Sri Lanka
- Term length: 5 years
- Inaugural holder: Dingiri Banda Wijetunge
- Formation: 1 June 1988
- Website: governor.nw.gov.lk

The governor of the North Western Province of Sri Lanka (Sinhala: වයඹ පළාත් ආණ්ඩුකාරවරයා Wayamba palāth āndukāravarayā) is responsible for the management of the North Western Provincial Council. Some of the office's key functions include exercising powers vested in the governor by the Provincial Council Act No. 42 of 1987 amended by Act No. 28 of 1990 and the 13th Amendment to the Constitution.

== Governors ==
Parties

Independent United National Party Sri Lanka Freedom Party Sri Lanka Podujana Peramuna Communist Party of Sri Lanka

No.	Name	Portrait	Party	Took office	Left office	Refs
1	Dingiri Banda Wijetunga		United National Party	1 June 1988	31 January 1989	
2	Montague Jayawickrama		United National Party	1 February 1989	13 October 1993	
3	Karunasena Kodituwakku		United National Party	13 October 1993	7 July 1994	
4	Anandatissa de Alwis		United National Party	8 July 1994	12 January 1995	
5	Hector Arawwawala		Sri Lanka Freedom Party	13 January 1995	3 January 1999	
6	Siripala Jayaweera		Sri Lanka Freedom Party	3 January 1999	30 April 2004	
7	Dharmadasa Wanniarachchi		Sri Lanka Freedom Party	30 April 2004	5 October 2007	
8	Tissa Balalla		Sri Lanka Freedom Party	5 October 2007	23 January 2015	
9	Amara Piyaseeli Ratnayake		United National Party	23 January 2015	11 April 2018	
10	K. C. Logeswaran		Independent	12 April 2018	4 January 2019	
10	Peshala Jayarathne		Sri Lanka Freedom Party	4 January 2019	21 November 2019	
11	A. J. M. Muzammil		Sri Lanka Podujana Peramuna	21 November 2019	31 August 2020	
12	Raja Collure		Communist Party of Sri Lanka	31 August 2020	7 December 2021	
13	Wasantha Karannagoda		Independent	9 December 2021	17 May 2023	
14	Lakshman Yapa Abeywardena		Sri Lanka Freedom Party	17 May 2023	1 May 2024	
15	Naseer Ahamed		Independent	2 May 2024	23 September 2024	
16	Tissa Kumarasiri		Independent	25 September 2024	Incumbent	

== See also ==
- Chief minister (Sri Lanka)
