= Tissa Balalle =

Sri Lankan politician

Tissa Reginald Balalle (born 15 July 1937) is the eighth Governor of the North Western Province of Sri Lanka. He was in office from 2007 to 2015. He also worked as a member of parliament of sri lanka in 1970-1977.

Political offices
| Preceded by Dharmadasa Wanniarachchi | Governor of the North Western Province; 2007–2015 | Succeeded by Amara Piyaseeli Ratnayake |
