= Mohan Lal Grero =

Sri Lankan politician

Hon. Mohan Lal Grero

Member of Parliament for Colombo District
- In office 2010–2019

Personal details
- Party: United People's Freedom Alliance
- Education: Ananda College

Mohan Lal Grero is a Sri Lankan educationist, engineer, and former politician. He was a member of the Parliament of Sri Lanka representing the Colombo District and was the State Minister of University Education. He was elected as an opposition United National Party member of parliament but crossed over to the ruling United People's Freedom Alliance in November 2011. He is the founder of the Lyceum International School.

== Education ==
He received his primary education from Royal Preparatory School and moved to Ananda College for secondary education in 1966. In 1974 he entered the Katubedda Campus of the University of Sri Lanka and graduated in 1980 with an honours degree in engineering. In 1986 he gained his Pilot's license and gained an Executive Diploma in Business Administration from the University of Colombo, winning the Professor Linus de Silva challenge Gold Medal.

== Lyceum International School ==
Lyceum International School was founded by Lal Grero in 1993, to foster all-round development through English-medium learning in Sri Lanka. It is the largest International School network in Sri Lanka providing all pre-primary, primary and secondary education, and the largest school in Sri Lanka With over 23,300 students and 3,300 teachers and staff.
