= Champa Janaki Rajaratne =

Sabaragamuwa Provincial Governor and a retired High Court Judge

Champa Janaki Rajaratne is the governor of Sabaragamuwa Province of Sri Lanka and a retired judge of the High Court of Sri Lanka. Rajaratne was among nine new governors appointed by the president in September 2024.
