= Karunasena Kodituwakku =

Sri Lankan politician (born 1945)

Hon. Karunasena Kodituwakku
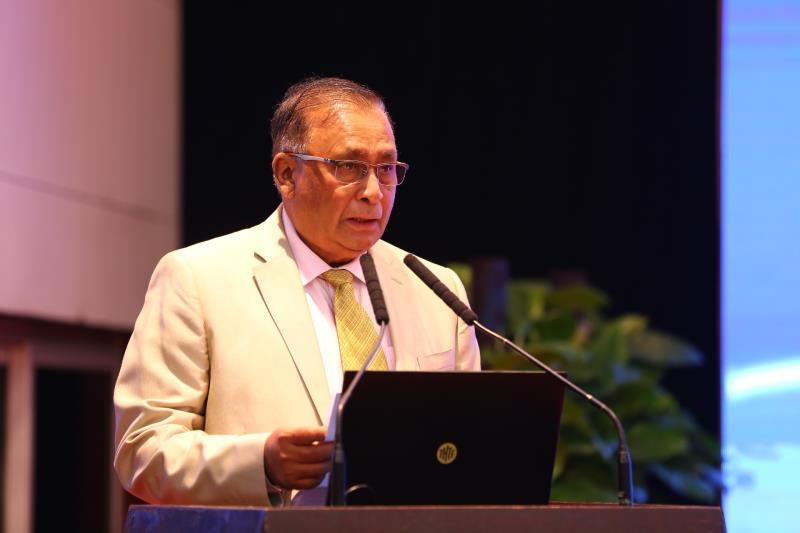

Sri Lankan Ambassador to China
- In office 2015–2020
- Preceded by: Ranjit Uyangoda
- Succeeded by: Dr. Palitha Kohona

Asia-Pacific Representative to the UNESCO Executive Board
- In office 2003–2007

Cabinet Minister of Education, Human Resources Development and Cultural Affairs
- In office 2001–2004

3rd Governor of North Western Province
- In office 13 October 1993 – 7 July 1994

Sri Lankan Ambassador to Japan and South Korea
- In office 1988–1991

Member of Parliament for Colombo District
- In office 25 August 1994 – 7 February 2004

Personal details
- Born: 21 March 1945 (age 81) British Ceylon
- Party: United National Party
- Spouse: Chandani Dahanayake Kodituwakku
- Children: Manikya, Isankya, Danushka
- Occupation: Academic Diplomat Politician
- Profession: Economist, University Lecturer

Karunasena Kodituwakku (born March 21, 1945) is a Sri Lankan politician, academic and diplomat. He was the Sri Lankan ambassador to China, and non-resident ambassador to Mongolia and North Korea. He was the former Sri Lankan Cabinet Minister of Education, Human Resources Development and Cultural Affairs and the third governor of the North Western Province of Sri Lanka. He also served as the vice chancellor of University of Sri Jayewardenepura and Sri Lankan ambassador to Japan and Republic of Korea.

== Early life and education ==
Kodituwakku received his higher education at the University of Kelaniya, where he gained a BA (Hons) degree in economics in 1968. He received his MA degree in economics from the University of New England (Australia) on a Colombo Plan scholarship, and his doctorate (D.Litt.) from the University of Sri Jayewardenepura.

== Academic career ==
Between 1968 and 1991, he served as a senior lecturer in economics at the University of Sri Jayewardenepura. In 1978 he was seconded to the Ministry of Youth Affairs and Employment as a planning director with the responsibility for the introduction of the graduate placement scheme to help ease high unemployment among graduates in the 1970s. In 1983 he was appointed by the then-Sri Lankan president, J.R. Jayawardena, as the competent authority of the university when the incumbent Vice Chancellor resigned his post, and July that year he was appointed its Vice Chancellor which he held till April 1988. Post-graduate Management Institute (PIM), post graduate studies on forestry department, medical faculty and the library complex were started during his time as the VC. In 1986 he became the President of the University Vice-Chancellors' Federation and was elected an Executive member of the London -based Association of Commonwealth Universities.

== Diplomatic career ==
In 1988 Kodituwakku left Sri Lanka to serve as the ambassador of Sri Lanka in Japan (1988–1989) and South Korea (1989–1991).

In 2015, Kodituwakku was appointed the Sri Lankan ambassador to China. He is also the Non-resident Ambassador to Mongolia and North Korea.

== Political career ==
After his return to Sri Lanka, he became the 3rd Governor of the Northwestern Province in 1993.

Kodituwakku resigned from this position in 1994 to run for Parliament of Sri Lanka from the United National Party (UNP) and was elected as a Member of Parliament representing Colombo District in the 1994 Parliamentary Elections and re-elected in the subsequent 2000 Parliamentary Elections.

The 2001 Parliamentary Elections victory of the UNP saw him appointed to the Cabinet as the Cabinet Minister of Education, Human Resources Development, and Cultural Affairs.

Kodituwakku was nominated as Sri Lanka's candidate to the UNESCO Executive Board in 2003. He was elected as the Asia-Pacific Representative to the UNESCO Executive Board for 2003-2007, recording the highest number and a record number of votes in the election held at UNESCO Headquarters in Paris, France.

== See also ==
- List of Sri Lankan non-career diplomats

Political offices
Preceded by Montague Jayawickrama	Governor of the North Western Province; 1993–1994	Succeeded by Anandatissa de Alwis
