= Udith Lokubandara =

Sri Lankan politician (born 1984)

Hon. Udith Lokubandara

Member of Parliament for Badulla District
- In office 2010–2015
- Succeeded by: Devan Sanjaya Lokubandara

Personal details
- Born: 19 December 1984 (age 41) Haputale
- Party: Sri Lanka Podujana Peramuna, United People's Freedom Alliance; Sri Lanka Freedom Party
- Spouse: Rajitha Thennakoon
- Children: Thareesh Sanjaya Lokubandara (son ) Udeesha Indunil Lokubandara (daughter) Devan Sanjaya Lokubandara (son); Devina Erandima Lokubandara (daughter)
- Parent(s): W. J. M. Lokubandara (father); Malathi Lokubandara (mother)
- Education: Lyceum International School; University of London
- Occupation: Chief Organiser Sri Lanka Freedom Party Haputale Electorate
- Profession: Marketeer

Wijesinghe Jayaweera Mudiyanselage Udith Sanjaya Lokubandara (born 19 December 1984) (known as Udith Lokubandara) is a Sri Lankan politician. Current Parliament Affairs Secretary to Prime Minister Mahinda Rajapaksa, he was his former private secretary and Member of Parliament, representing the Badulla District. He is the son of former Speaker W. J. M. Lokubandara.

== Early life ==
He was raised in Nugegoda and studied at Lyceum International School. After his high school graduation he joined the University of London as an external student and read for a Diploma in Economics. He is a Dimplomate from LCCI and holds an ACIM qualification from the Charterd Institute of Marketing UK.

== Political career ==
President Mahinda Rajapakse was one of the witnesses at his wedding. On that day, he was appointed as the Sri Lanka Freedom Party organizer for Haputale electorate. He served as an adviser to the President Rajapakse prior to his election to parliament in 2010. He contested the 2015 parliamentary election and the 2020 parliamentary election, without securing a seat. He served as personal secretary to the former president and thereafter private secretary when Rajapaksa became Prime Minister in 2019.

== See also ==
- List of political families in Sri Lanka
