= W. A. Karunasena =

Sri Lankan politician (born 1928)

Wanni Arachchige Karunasena (born 7 August 1928) was a Ceylonese politician. He was the member of Parliament of Sri Lanka from Pelmadulla representing the Sri Lanka Freedom Party from 1960 to 1967.
