= N. Vedanayagam =

Sri Lankan politician

Nagalingam Vedanayagam is the current governor of the Northern Province of Sri Lanka and a former government agent for Jaffna.
