= Janaka Priyantha Bandara =

Sri Lankan politician and diplomat (born 1968)

Janaka Priyantha Bandara (born 1 February 1968) is a Sri Lankan Politician and diplomat. He was the Governor of Sabaragamuwa. He was earlier the Sri Lanka's Ambassador to the UAE. He was a member of the Sri Lankan Parliament, from the national list representing the Sri Lanka Freedom Party.

== See also ==
- Sri Lankan Non Career Diplomats

Political offices
Preceded by Alavi Moulana (as Acting Governor)	Governor of Sabaragamuwa; 2009–2010	Succeeded by W. J. M. Lokubandara
