= Angoda, Western Province, Sri Lanka =

City in Western Province, Sri Lanka

Angoda අංගොඩ அங்கொடை
- Village
- Location within Sri Lanka Location within India
- Coordinates: 6°56′12″N 79°55′37″E
- Country: Sri Lanka
- Province: Western Province
- Time zone: UTC+5:30 (Sri Lanka Standard Time)

Angoda (Sinhala: අංගොඩ, Tamil: அங்கொடை) is a city in Colombo District, Western Province, Sri Lanka. It is famous for the National Institute of Mental Health. The name Angoda was changed to ―Mulleriyawa New Town in 1985 by the then-government of Sri Lanka.

== See also ==
- List of towns in Western Province, Sri Lanka
