= 1979 in Sri Lanka =

- Decades: 1970s; 1980s; 1990s
- See also: Other events of 1979; Timeline of Sri Lankan history

The following lists notable events that occurred during 1979 in Sri Lanka.

== Incumbents ==
- President – J. R. Jayewardene
- Prime Minister – Ranasinghe Premadasa
- Chief Justice – Neville Samarakoon

== Events ==
- Sri Lanka defeated India in the ICC World Cup. They were the winners of the inaugural ICC Trophy, ahead of the cricket World Cup.
- Ethnic tensions and political unrest increase, as the Tamil minority realize their political party is having minimal success in the south.

== Births ==
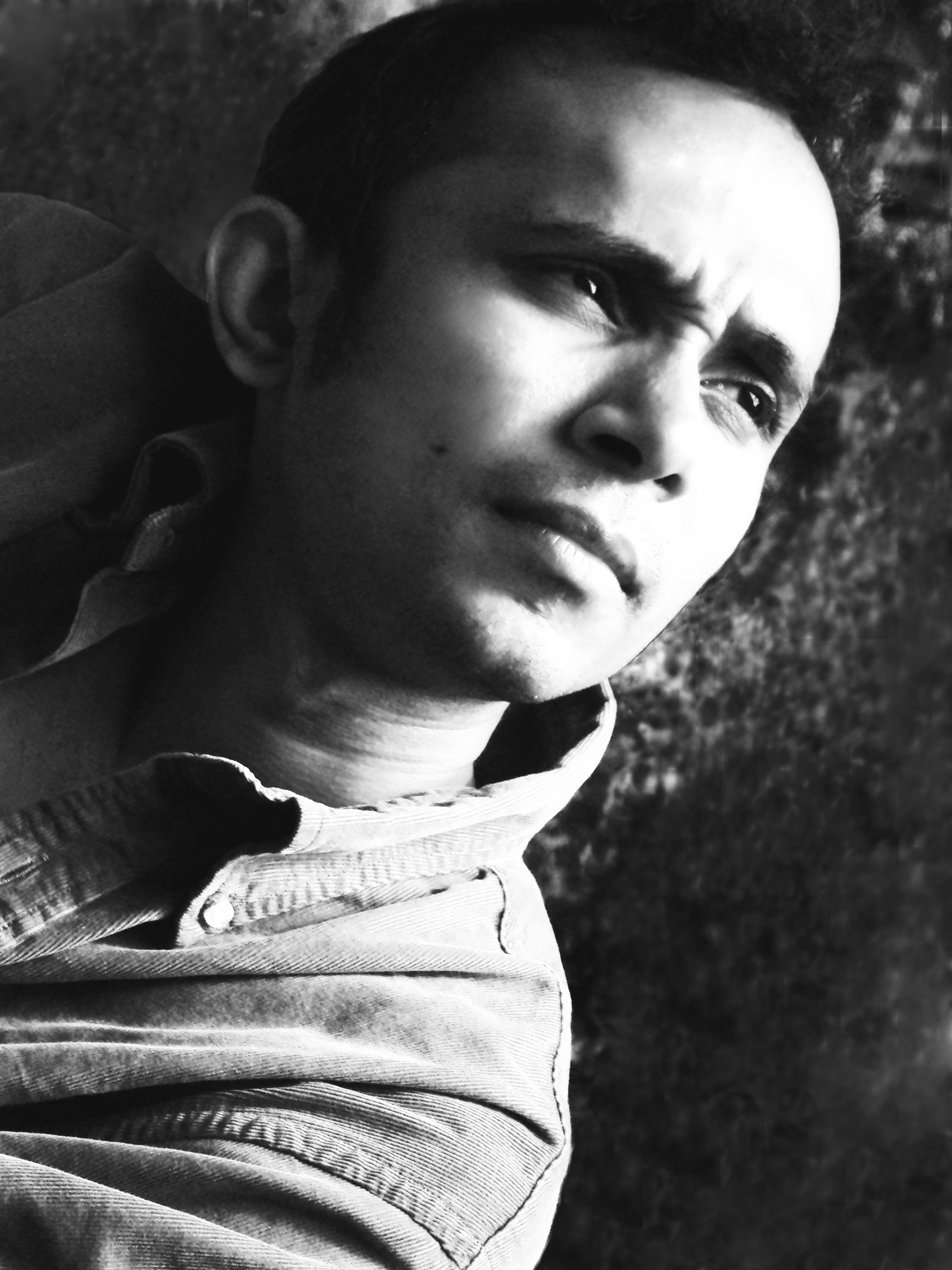
Malaka Dewapriya

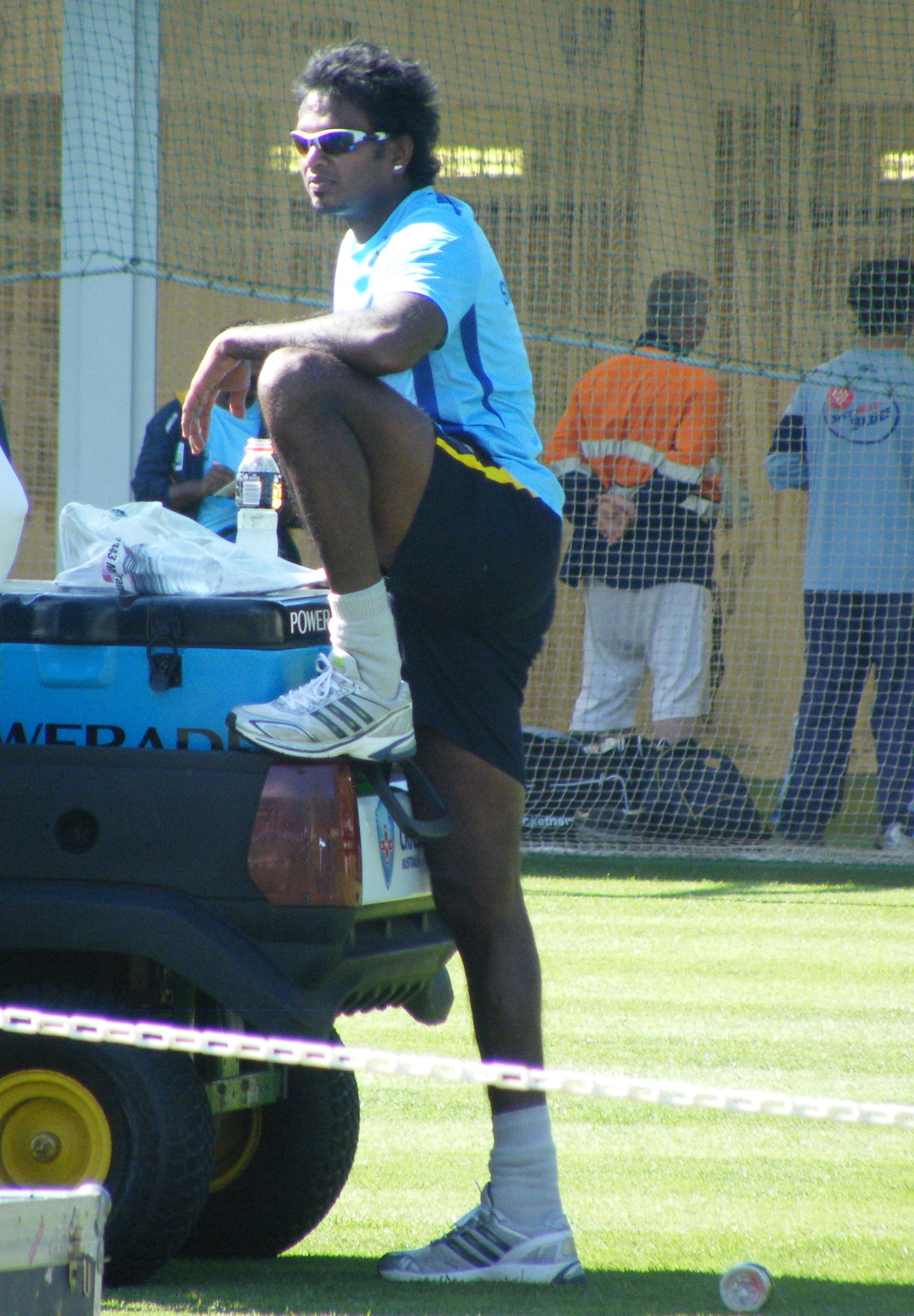
Dilhara Fernando

- 4 January – Chamila Gamage, cricketer.
- 27 February – Sanjaya Rodrigo, cricketer.
- 28 February – Dinesh Lalinda, cricketer.
- 2 March – Dharshana Gamage, cricketer.
- 28 March – Duminda Dissanayake, politician.
- 30 March – Malaka Dewapriya, film maker.
- 2 April – Amila Perera, cricketer.
- 13 May – Krishantha Ukwatte, cricketer.
- 26 May – Malinda Warnapura, cricketer.
- 22 June – Buddhika Mendis, cricketer.
- 10 July – Dinesh Subasinghe, musician.
- 11 July – Nisitha Rupasinghe, cricketer.
- 19 July – Dilhara Fernando, cricketer.
- 29 July – Chaminda Ruwan, cricketer.
- 10 August – Dinusha Fernando, cricketer.
- 14 August – Ranga Dias, cricketer.
- 11 September – Thuwan Raheem, footballer.
- 28 September – Mahesh Bogahalanda, cricketer.
- 6 October – Chanuka Bandara, cricketer.
- 7 October – Sujeewa de Silva, cricketer.
- 9 October – Prasanna Jayawardene, cricketer.
- 14 October – Hasantha Fernando, cricketer.
- 26 October – Indika Basnayake, cricketer.
- 29 October – Duminda Perera, cricketer.
- 2 December – Manju Wanniarachchi, boxer.
- 4 December – Wenura Caldera, cricketer.
- 14 December – Chamara Silva, cricketer.
- 17 December – Upekha Fernando, cricketer.
- 31 December – Malinga Bandara, cricketer.

== Deaths ==
- 17 February – K. Alvapillai, civil servant (b. 1905).
- 23 May – S. Selvanayagam, geographer and academic (b. 1932).
- 14 August – N. M. Perera, politician (b. 1905).
- 15 September – Don Carlin Gunawardena, academic (b. 1899).
- 28 December – Dommie Jayawardena, actor and singer (b. 1927).
- Unknown date – I. J. Wickrema, trade unionist (b. 1922).
