= 1980 in Sri Lanka =

- Decades: 1970s; 1980s; 1990s; 2000s
- See also: Other events of 1980; Timeline of Sri Lankan history

The following lists notable events that occurred during 1980 in Sri Lanka.

== Incumbents ==
- President – J. R. Jayewardene
- Prime Minister – Ranasinghe Premadasa
- Chief Justice – Neville Samarakoon

== Events ==
- Sri Lanka competed at the 1980 Summer Olympics in Moscow, USSR. From 1948 to 1972, the nation was known as Ceylon at the Olympic Games.

== Births ==
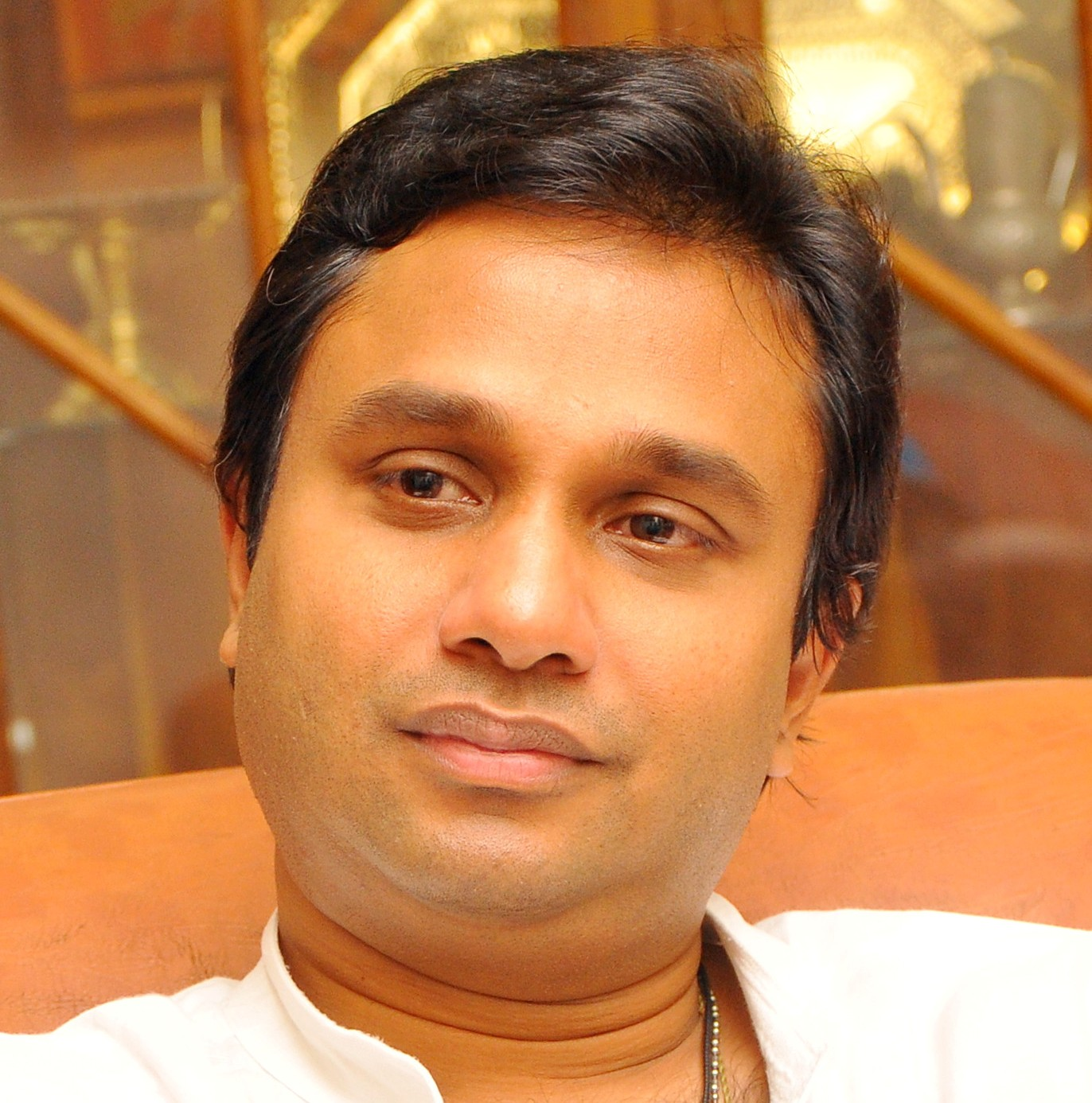
Mayantha Dissanayake

- 11 January – Mayantha Dissanayake, politician.
- 13 January – Niru, musician.
- 19 January – Michael Vandort, cricketer.
- 1 February – Janaka Thisakutti Arachchi, politician.
- 27 February – Harshana Rajakaruna, politician.
- 25 March – Kasun Jayasuriya, footballer.
- 17 April – Prasad Jayawardene, cricketer.
- 30 May – Gihan Premachandra, cricketer.
- 3 July – Dilhara Lokuhettige, cricketer.
- 11 July – Indika Ruwanpura, cricketer.
- 22 August – Charitha Buddhika, cricketer.
- 4 October – Praba Udawatte, cricketer.
- 5 October – Malintha Gajanayake, cricketer.
- 24 October – Umayangana Wickramasinghe, actress.
- 25 October – Prabath Nissanka, cricketer.
- 31 October – Tharanath Basnayaka, politician.
- 8 November – Mohamed Ramees, footballer.
- 11 December – Nuwan Ekanayake, cricketer.
- 16 December – Waruna Shantha, cricketer.
- Unknown date
  - Ida Carmelitta, gang rape and murder victim.
  - Mohanarajah Gajamohan, scientist.
  - Suresh Sriskandarajah, militant.

== Deaths ==
- 1 March – R. A. Chandrasena, musician (b. 1924).
- 12 April – Stanley de Silva, cricketer (b. 1956).
- 20 April – M. Canagaratnam, politician (b. 1924).
- May – Edward Buultjens, cricketer (b. 1913).
- 28 August – A. P. Jayasuriya, politician (b. 1897)
- 1 September – Xavier Thaninayagam, academic (b. 1913).
- 2 October – John Kotelawala, politician (b. 1895).
- 4 December – Hamilton Shirley Amerasinghe, diplomat and civil servant (b. 1913).
- Unknown date
  - Oliver Weerasinghe, architect and diplomat.
