= K. Pathmanabha =

Sri Lankan Tamil militant

- க. பத்மநாபா
- Born: 19 November 1951
- Died: 19 June 1990 (aged 38); Kodambakam, Madras, India
- Other name: Ranjan
- Years active: –1990
- Organization: Eelam People's Revolutionary Liberation Front

Kandasamy Pathmanabha (Tamil: கந்தசாமி பத்மநாபா; 19 November 1951 – 19 June 1990) was a Sri Lankan Tamil rebel and founder/leader of the Eelam People's Revolutionary Liberation Front (EPRLF), a separatist Tamil militant organisation in Sri Lanka.

== Early life ==
Pathmanabha was born on 19 November 1951. He was from Kankesanthurai in northern Ceylon.

Pathmanabha became interested in radical politics in the late 1960s. He was one of the members of the Tamil Student Federation/Tamil Students' League which was formed in 1972 as a reaction to the discriminatory Policy of standardisation. The 1974 Tamil conference incident further radicalised Pathmanabha.

== ELO ==
In 1974/75 Pathmanabha and others founded the Eelam Liberation Organisation (Eela Viduthalai Iyakkam) (ELO). On 10 May 1976 the ELO robbed the Puloly Multi-purpose Cooperative Society's bank in Puloly. Pathmanabha was personally involved in the robbery. Others involved in the robbery included Varatharaja Perumal (later Chief Minister of North Eastern Province), V. Balakumaran (later leader of the Eelam Revolutionary Organisation of Students) and S. Thavaraja (later an Eelam People's Democratic Party MP and leader of the opposition on the Northern Provincial Council). After the robbery Pathmanabha went on the run whilst the ELO disintegrated due to the security crackdown.

== GUES/EROS ==
Pathmanabha moved to London in 1976 to study accountancy. Here he met with other Tamils who shared his views. Together they formed the General Union of Eelam Students (GUES) and the Eelam Revolutionary Organisation of Students (EROS). Said Hammami, the Palestine Liberation Organization's representative in London, helped a small group Tamils including Pathmanabha take military training in Lebanon. In 1978 he went to India to establish a base for GUES/EROS. He then returned to Sri Lanka but the security forces were still looking for him so he had to travel in disguise.

== EPRLF ==
Pathmanabha and other members, including Douglas Devananda, Varatharaja Perumal and Suresh Premachandran, left the EROS in 1981 and formed their own militant group which would come to be known as the Eelam People's Revolutionary Liberation Front (EPRLF). Pathmanabha moved to Kodambakam, Madras, India in 1981 to establish the new group.

In December 1986 the rival Liberation Tigers of Tamil Eelam (LTTE) attacked the EPRLF in Sri Lanka, inflicting a heavy losses and killing Gaffoor, the EPRLF's military commander. Many EPRLF cadres were killed or taken prisoner and EPRLF camps and weapons were seized by the LTTE. Devananda was blamed for the debacle. The LTTE's animosity against the EPRLF, which it considered to be pro-India, increased following the outbreak of fighting between the LTTE and the Indian Peace Keeping Force (IPKF), a military unit in the Sri Lankan civil war, in October 1987. The LTTE called for a boycott of the 1988 North Eastern Provincial Council election, stating that anyone who contested would be labelled a traitor and punished. The EPRLF nevertheless contested and, with the connivance of the IPKF, secured 41 of the 71 seats on the North Eastern Provincial Council. Varatharaja Perumal became the first (and only) Chief Minister of North Eastern Province. On 1 March 1990, just as the IPKF were preparing to withdraw from Sri Lanka, Perumal moved a motion in the North Eastern Provincial Council declaring an independent Eelam. Fearful of the consequences once the IPKF had pulled out, the EPRLF leadership fled to India. On 11 March 1990 Pathmanabha was flown from Trincomalee to Bhubaneswar in an Indian military aircraft. President Ranasinghe Premadasa imposed direct rule on the North Eastern province on 25 March 1990.

== Death ==
On the evening of 19 June 1990 the EPRLF central committee were meeting at a flat at the Zachria Colony in Kodambakam. At around 7pm gunmen broke into the flat and started firing. Eight people including Pathmanabha, Member of Parliament G. Yogasangari and provincial minister P. Kirubakaran were killed. Five EPRLF cadres waiting outside the block of flats were also killed. The killings was blamed on the rival rebel group LTTE.
