= 1989 in Sri Lanka =

- Decades: 1970s; 1980s; 1990s; 2000s
- See also: Other events of 1989; Timeline of Sri Lankan history

The following lists events that happened during 1989 in Sri Lanka.

== Incumbents ==
- President: J. R. Jayewardene (until 2 January); Ranasinghe Premadasa (starting 2 January)
- Prime Minister: Ranasinghe Premadasa (until 2 January); Dingiri Banda Wijetunga (starting 2 January)
- Chief Justice: Parinda Ranasinghe

=== Governors ===
- Governor of Central Province: E. L. B. Hurulle
- Governor of North Central Province: Dingiri Bandara Welagedara (until May); E. L. Senanayake (starting May)
- Governor of North Eastern Province: Nalin Seneviratne (until 31 January); Montague Jayawickrama (starting 1 February)
- Governor of North Western Province: Dingiri Banda Wijetunga
- Governor of Sabaragamuwa: Noel Wimalasena
- Governor of Southern Province: Abdul Bakeer Markar
- Governor of Uva: P. C. Imbulana (starting May)
- Governor of Western Province: Suppiah Sharvananda

=== Chief Ministers ===
- Chief Minister of Central Province: W. M. P. B. Dissanayake
- Chief Minister of North Central Province: G. D. Mahindasoma
- Chief Minister of North Eastern Province: Varatharaja Perumal
- Chief Minister of North Western Province: Gamini Jayawickrama Perera
- Chief Minister of Sabaragamuwa: G. V. Punchinilame
- Chief Minister of Southern Province: M. S. Amarasiri
- Chief Minister of Uva: Percy Samaraweera
- Chief Minister of Western Province: Susil Moonesinghe

== Events ==
- Sri Lankan Civil War
  - Indian intervention in the Sri Lankan Civil War
- 1987–1989 JVP insurrection
- 15 February – 1989 Sri Lankan parliamentary election: Sri Lanka holds their 9th parliamentary elections, with the ruling United National Party winning with a total of 125 seats.

== Notes ==
a. Gunaratna, Rohan. (1998). Pg.353, Sri Lanka's Ethnic Crisis and National Security, Colombo: South Asian Network on Conflict Research. ISBN 955-8093-00-9
