= 1988 in Sri Lanka =

- Decades: 1970s; 1980s; 1990s; 2000s
- See also: Other events of 1988; Timeline of Sri Lankan history

The following lists events that happened during 1988 in Sri Lanka.

== Incumbents ==
- President: J. R. Jayewardene
- Prime Minister: Ranasinghe Premadasa
- Chief Justice: Suppiah Sharvananda (until 6 June); Parinda Ranasinghe (starting 6 June)

=== Governors ===
- Governor of Central Province: E. L. B. Hurulle (starting June)
- Governor of North Central Province: Dingiri Bandara Welagedara (starting May)
- Governor of North Eastern Province: Nalin Seneviratne (starting 30 November)
- Governor of North Western Province: Dingiri Banda Wijetunga (starting 1 June)
- Governor of Sabaragamuwa: Noel Wimalasena (starting 30 April)
- Governor of Southern Province: Abdul Bakeer Markar (starting 13 June)
- Governor of Uva: P. C. Imbulana (starting May)
- Governor of Western Province: Suppiah Sharvananda (starting 6 June)

=== Chief Ministers ===
- Chief Minister of Central Province: W. M. P. B. Dissanayake (starting 9 June)
- Chief Minister of North Central Province: G. D. Mahindasoma (starting 2 May)
- Chief Minister of North Eastern Province: Varatharaja Perumal (starting 10 December)
- Chief Minister of North Western Province: Gamini Jayawickrama Perera (starting 4 May)
- Chief Minister of Sabaragamuwa: G. V. Punchinilame (starting April)
- Chief Minister of Southern Province: M. S. Amarasiri (starting 16 June)
- Chief Minister of Uva: Percy Samaraweera (starting May)
- Chief Minister of Western Province: Susil Moonesinghe (starting 9 June)

== Events ==
- Sri Lankan Civil War
  - Indian intervention in the Sri Lankan Civil War
- 1987–1989 JVP insurrection
- 16 February – Assassination of Vijaya Kumaratunga: Sri Lankan politician and founder of the Sri Lanka Mahajana Pakshaya Vijaya Kumaratunga is assassinated by an assassin of militant organization Deshapremi Janatha Vyaparaya while attempting to leave his home in Polhengoda.
- 19 December – 1988 Sri Lankan presidential election: Prime Minister Ranasinghe Premadasa of the ruling United National Party is elected President of Sri Lanka, receiving 50.4% of all votes cast and defeating Sri Lanka Freedom Party candidate Sirimavo Bandaranaike.

== Deaths ==
- 12 February – S. Nadarajah, Tamil lawyer and politician
- 16 February – Vijaya Kumaratunga, 42, actor and politician (b. 1945)
- 6 June – Chandra Fernando, 46, Roman Catholic priest and venerable (b. 1942)

== Notes ==
a. Gunaratna, Rohan. (1998). Pg.353, Sri Lanka's Ethnic Crisis and National Security, Colombo: South Asian Network on Conflict Research. ISBN 955-8093-00-9
