= Bogahalanda =

Bogahalanda may refer to:

- Mahesh Bogahalanda (born 1979), Sri Lankan cricketer
- Bogahalanda Grama Niladhari Division, area in Sri Lanka
