= Maheswaran =

Maheswaran மகேஸ்வரன்
- Pronunciation: Makēsvaraṉ
- Gender: Male
- Language: Tamil

Origin
- Meaning: Shiva
- Region of origin: Southern India; North-eastern Sri Lanka

Other names
- Alternative spelling: Maheswaran; Maheeswaran
- Short form: Mahesh

Maheswaran (Tamil: மகேஸ்வரன், romanized: Makēsvaraṉ) is a Tamil male given name. Due to the Tamil tradition of using patronymic surnames it may also be a surname for males and females. The female variant of Maheswaran is Maheswari.

== Etymology ==
The name stands for "Grand Lord", see Mahesh.

== Notable people ==
- Murugesapillai Maheswaran (born 1939), mathematician, astrophysicist and educator
- Panagoda Maheswaran (born 1955), Sri Lankan Tamil militant
- T. Maheswaran (1966–2008), assassinated Sri Lankan Tamil MP
- Vijayakala Maheswaran (born 1972), Sri Lankan MP; wife of T. Maheswaran
- Uma Maheswaran (1945–1989), Sri Lankan Tamil militant

=== Fictional characters ===
- Connie Maheswaran, a character in the TV series Steven Universe
