= 1984 in Sri Lanka =

- Decades: 1970s; 1980s; 1990s; 2000s
- See also: Other events of 1984; Timeline of Sri Lankan history

The following lists events that happened during 1984 in Sri Lanka.

== Incumbents ==
- President – J. R. Jayewardene
- Prime Minister – Ranasinghe Premadasa
- Chief Justice – Neville Samarakoon then Suppiah Sharvananda

== Events ==
- Sri Lankan Civil War
  - Eelam War I
- 28 January – A bomb explodes in Hotel Lanka Oberoi in Colombo. One employee is killed.
- 4 December – 1984 Mannar massacre: The Sri Lanka Army perpetuates a brutal massacre of Sri Lankan Tamil civilians in the town of Mannar, claiming the lives of roughly 107–150 ethnic Tamils. The attack was in response to an incident when three army jeeps hit a land mine, killing one soldier.

== Notes ==
a. Gunaratna, Rohan. (1998). Pg.353, Sri Lanka's Ethnic Crisis and National Security, Colombo: South Asian Network on Conflict Research. ISBN 955-8093-00-9
