= Mahesh =

Mahesh may refer to:

- A title of Shiva, a Hindu deity
- Mahesh (name), personal name
  - Mahesh (Malayalam actor), Indian actor
  - Mahesh (Tamil actor), Indian actor in Tamil cinema
- Mahesh, Serampore, a place in West Bengal, India
