= 1990 in Sri Lanka =

- Decades: 1970s; 1980s; 1990s; 2000s; 2010s
- See also: Other events of 1990; Timeline of Sri Lankan history

The following lists events that happened during 1990 in Sri Lanka.

== Incumbents ==
- President: Ranasinghe Premadasa
- Prime Minister: Dingiri Banda Wijetunga
- Chief Justice: Parinda Ranasinghe

=== Governors ===
- Central Province – E. L. B. Hurulle (until 1 February); P. C. Imbulana (starting 1 February)
- North Central Province – E. L. Senanayake
- North Eastern Province – Nalin Seneviratne
- North Western Province – Karunasena Kodituwakku
- Sabaragamuwa Province – C. N. Saliya Mathew
- Southern Province – Leslie Mervyn Jayaratne
- Uva Province – P. C. Imbulana (until January); Tilak Ratnayake (starting February)
- Western Province – Suppiah Sharvananda

=== Chief Ministers ===
- Central Province – W. M. P. B. Dissanayake
- North Central Province – G. D. Mahindasoma
- North Eastern Province – Varatharaja Perumal (until 10 March)
- North Western Province – Gamini Jayawickrama Perera
- Sabaragamuwa Province – Abeyratne Pilapitiya
- Southern Province – M. S. Amarasiri
- Uva Province – Percy Samaraweera
- Western Province – Susil Moonesinghe

== Events ==
- Sri Lankan Civil War
  - Eelam War II
- 11 June – Sinhalese officers are responsible for the killing of over 600 unarmed Tamil civilians along with LTTE militants in the Northern Province of Sri Lanka.
- 20 June – The town of Kalmunai is allegedly subjected to intense shelling by the Sri Lanka Army. As a result, the LTTE withdrew from the town. Subsequently, once the army had occupied the town, the massacre of civilians began. The UTHR said that the number of people who were killed or disappeared by the Sri Lankan Army was over 1,000 and alleged that over 250 were killed.

== Notes ==
a. Gunaratna, Rohan. (1998). Pg.353, Sri Lanka's Ethnic Crisis and National Security, Colombo: South Asian Network on Conflict Research. ISBN 955-8093-00-9
