= 1987 in Sri Lanka =

- Decades: 1970s; 1980s; 1990s; 2000s
- See also: Other events of 1987; Timeline of Sri Lankan history

The following lists events that happened during 1987 in Sri Lanka.

== Incumbents ==
- President – J. R. Jayewardene
- Prime Minister – Ranasinghe Premadasa
- Chief Justice – Suppiah Sharvananda

== Events ==
- Sri Lankan Civil War
  - Eelam War I
  - Indian intervention in the Sri Lankan Civil War
- 1987–1989 JVP insurrection
- June – The Sri Lankan Army besieges the town Jaffna, civilian casualties begin to mount.
- 29 July – The Indo-Sri Lanka Peace Accord is signed in Colombo between Indian Prime Minister Rajiv Gandhi and Sri Lankan President J. R. Jayewardene, thus bringing an end to the first phase of the Sri Lankan Civil War.
- July – Following the signing of the Indo-Sri Lankan Accord, the Indian Peace Keeping Force arrives in Sri Lanka. Indian intervention in the Sri Lankan Civil War begins.
- 29 September–8 October – 1987 anti-Sinhalese riots: Tamil mobs and the LTTE perpetuate a series of riots and massacres against Sinhalese civilians in the Eastern Province, resulting in the deaths of over 200 Sinhalese civilians and displacing thousands more.

== Births ==
- February 4 – Gayas Christopher, cricketer

== Notes ==
a. Gunaratna, Rohan. (1998). Pg.353, Sri Lanka's Ethnic Crisis and National Security, Colombo: South Asian Network on Conflict Research. ISBN 955-8093-00-9
