= Ruwanpura =

Ruwanpura is a surname. Notable people with the surname include:

- Indika Ruwanpura (born 1980), Sri Lankan cricketer
- Janaka Ruwanpura, Sri Lankan academic
