= Sriskandarajah =

Sriskandarajah is a surname. Notable people with the surname include:

- Dhananjayan Sriskandarajah (born 1975), Sri Lankan-born British-Australian activist
- P. Sriskandarajah (1905–1968), Sri Lankan lawyer and judge
- S. Sriskandarajah (c.1953–2014), Sri Lankan lawyer and judge
- Suresh Sriskandarajah (born 1980), Canadian terrorist supporter
