= Ekanayake =

- Gender: Unisex
- Language: Sinhala

Other names
- Variant form: Ekanayaka

Ekanayake or Ekanayaka is a Sinhalese surname. Notable people with the surname include:

- Chandra Ekanayake, Sri Lankan lawyer and judge
- Ekanayake Edward Rohan Amerasekera, first indigenous Commander of the Sri Lanka Air Force
- Dilhani Ekanayake (born 1973), Sri Lankan actress
- Nandimithra Ekanayake (born 1943), Sri Lankan politician
- Narendra Ekanayake (born 1977), Bahamian cricketer
- Niluka Ekanayake, 10th Governor of Central Province, Sri Lanka
- Nuwan Ekanayake (born 1980), Sri Lankan cricketer
- Sarath Ekanayake, Sri Lankan politician
- Sepala Ekanayake (born 1949), Sri Lankan hijacker
- T. B. Ekanayake (1954–2020), Sri Lankan politician
- Thanuga Ekanayake, Sri Lankan cricketer
- W. B. Ekanayake (1948–2024), Sri Lankan politician
- Aden Ekanayake, Australian rugby union player of Sri Lankan descent
