= 1982 in Sri Lanka =

- Decades: 1970s; 1980s; 1990s; 2000s
- See also: Other events of 1982; Timeline of Sri Lankan history

The following lists events that happened during 1982 in Sri Lanka.

== Incumbents ==
- President – J. R. Jayewardene
- Prime Minister – Ranasinghe Premadasa
- Chief Justice – Neville Samarakoon

== Events ==
- 20 October – 1982 Sri Lankan presidential election: Sri Lanka holds its first ever presidential elections. Incumbent president J. R. Jayewardene of the ruling United National Party is elected winning 53% of all votes cast, defeating his closest rival, Hector Kobbekaduwa of the Sri Lanka Freedom Party, who won only 39% of the vote.
- 22 December – 1982 Sri Lankan national referendum: A national referendum was held, giving the people of Sri Lanka the option to extend the life of the current parliament by another 6 years, effectively cancelling the general elections which were due to be held before 1983. 54% of votes were cast in favour of the extension. The referendum was described as a dictatorial move by opposition parties, and was the first and so far only national referendum to be held in Sri Lanka.

== Notes ==
a. Gunaratna, Rohan. (1998). Pg.353, Sri Lanka's Ethnic Crisis and National Security, Colombo: South Asian Network on Conflict Research. ISBN 955-8093-00-9
