= 1981 in Sri Lanka =

- Decades: 1970s; 1980s; 1990s; 2000s
- See also: Other events of 1981; Timeline of Sri Lankan history

The following lists events that happened during 1981 in Sri Lanka.

== Incumbents ==
- President – J. R. Jayewardene
- Prime Minister – Ranasinghe Premadasa
- Chief Justice – Neville Samarakoon

== Events ==
- 31 May–1 June – Burning of Jaffna Public Library: A mob of Sinhalese civilians riot and set fire to the Jaffna Public Library in an arson attack. It was one of the most violent examples of ethnic biblioclasm in the 20th century.
- The England cricket team tours Sri Lanka in February 1982. The tour included two One Day International (ODI) matches and one Test match.
- Sri Lanka obtains Full Member status of the International Cricket Council (ICC) in 1981, making them the eighth Test playing nation.

== Notes ==
a. Gunaratna, Rohan. (1998). Pg.353, Sri Lanka's Ethnic Crisis and National Security, Colombo: South Asian Network on Conflict Research. ISBN 955-8093-00-9
