= Padmanabha murder case =

Political attack in 1990

The Padmanabha murder case was a sensational case during the earlier part of 1990 in Madras in Tamil Nadu, (India) and Sri Lanka. Padmanabha was the leader of EPRLF and he was murdered with 12 of his party men and two commoners in Madras, the capital of Tamil Nadu on 19 June 1990. The incident marked the first occasion when the Liberation Tigers of Tamil Eezham (LTTE), a militant organization, targeted an attack outside Sri Lanka.

The case had lot of political implications as the ruling DMK government in Tamil Nadu was overturned considered this incident and the assassination of ex-prime minister Rajiv Gandhi. Pottu Amman (a leader of LTTE), Ravichandran were in the list of accused.

A special investigation team was formulated with the name Tamil Nadu Special Investigation Team (TANSIT) by the Government of Tamil Nadu. It framed chargesheet against 22 people. The trial was held in a special TADA court formed in Chennai and 17 accused faced the trial. The court pronounced verdict on 22 November 1998 and sentenced Gundu Santhan and Anandraj to six and five year rigorous imprisonment. The court also ordered the Government of Tamil Nadu to pay a compensation of ₹2 lakh to the family of the deceased.

== Background ==
LTTE is a militant outfit which was fighting for the welfare of the Tamils in northern parts of Sri Lanka, against the suppression by majority Sinhanlese domination. India has active links with Sri Lanka and its politics from historic times and the association continued during the modern times as well. There were other organizations like EPRLF, which was fighting the cause of Tamils in a peaceful manner for Tamil welfare.

== Incident ==
Padmanabha was the leader of EPRLF and he was murdered with 12 of his party men and two commoners in Chennai, the capital of Tamil Nadu on 19 June 1990. Padmanabha and the other EPRLF leaders were having a meeting in Zachria Colony in Kodambakkam, a suburb in Chennai. There were two armed men, who came in an Ambassador car, which they earlier stole from Villupuram, a town 160 km (99 mi) from Chennai. Before the inmates could escape, they sprayed bullets on all the 13 men in the house. While escaping, they shot and killed two other pedestrians. Along with Padmanabha, the Finance Minister in the now defunct Northeastern Provincial Council P. Kirubakaran, and Member of Parliament Yogasankari, were also killed.

The accused were believed to have escaped to Sri Lanka by travelling all the way from Chennai to Vedaranyam by road and then taking a boat to northern Sri Lanka. All the injured were taken to the Government hospital where they were pronounced dead.

== Political implications ==
The incident marked the first occasion when the Liberation Tigers of Tamil Eezham (LTTE), targeted an attack outside Sri Lanka. The Tamil Nadu government was then ruled by the Dravida Munnetra Kazhagam (DMK) under M. Karunanidhi. The DMK government was accused of ensuring a smooth escapade route to the outfit. During the subsequent months, Rajiv Gandhi, the ex-prime minister and prime ministerial leader of Congress party was killed in a suicide attack on 21 May 1991 in Sriperumbudur in the outskirts of Chennai. The ruling DMK government was accused of helping the LTTE. The state government was dismissed before the Rajiv Gandhi assassination. It was also alleged the intelligence bureau and the Research and Analysis Wing (RAW) were not following the activities of the LTTE in the state. Many political experts saw close connection in both the attacks and assert that had the attackers of Padmanabha been controlled, attempts on Rajiv Gandhi would not have been possible. As per one version, the then Director General of Police (DGP) Durai, committed suicide as he was pressurised by the ruling DMK not to link LTTE.

== Chargesheet ==
A special investigation team was formulated with the name Tamil Nadu Special Investigation Team (TANSIT) by the Government of Tamil Nadu. The investigation chargesheet accused 26 people of conspiring the attack. Sivarasan and Gundu Santhan, who were also charged in Rajiv Gandhi assassination case, were primed accused in the case. Kiruban, another accused escaped from police custody. Six others, namely, Pottu Amman, Daniel, David, Dileepan, Ravi and Nagaraja - were declared proclaimed offenders and since they were absconding.

== Trial ==
The trial of the case was held in the TADA court, specially formulated for the case in Poonamallee in Chennai. The 17 accused in the order from A1 to A18, Chinna Santhan, Vicky, R. Nagarajan (Home secretary of Government of Tamil Nadu), Rajan alias Kunjan, T.V. Marudanayagam, Jayabalasingham, Chandravadana (wife of Jayabalasingham), Vasanthan, Anandaraj, Sebastian, Mahendran, Gunaraja, Irumborai, D. Veerasekaran, Subbulakshmi Jagadeesan (minister in the ruling DMK government in Tamil Nadu), Jagadeesan (Subbulakshmi's husband) and Ravichandran (brother of prominent politician Vaiko) faced the trial. The prosecution argued that the conspiracy was hatched in Jaffna, Trichy and Chennai and Pottu Amman was the mastermind. Gundu Santhan joined an engineering institute in Chennai to monitor the activities of EPRLF leaders. He informed the team of Sivarajan, David, Dileepan, Daniel and Ravi, who arrived on 10 June 1990. The assailants reached the spot, killed the leaders of EPRLF and fled in a Maruthi car to Pillaiyar Thidal in Thanjavur District and fled to Sri Lanka in a boat from there.

The court examined 206 witnesses and pronounced the judgement on 22 November 1997. It ruled that there were no concrete evidence on the first eight accused to have conspired the murder. The prosecution argument that R. Nagarajan, the home secretary, had instructed the police personnel not to act against the assailants, was also quashed for absolute lack of evidence. The court also rejected the argument that Subbulakshmi Jagadeesan and Jagadeesan housed Gundu Santhan in their house in Erode. Similar charges against Ravichandran and Veerasekaran was also dropped. The court indicted the Tamil Nadu police for their inefficiency and ordered the Government of Tamil Nadu to compensate ₹2 lakh rupees to the family of the deceased. The court declared two of the seventeen guilty, of which, Chinna Santhan was Section 3 (3) of TADA for advising, abetting and facilitating the crime and Anandaraj was found guilty under Section 3 (4) of TADA for harbouring Gundu Santhan. Chinna Santhan was sentenced to six years of rigorous imprisonment (RI) with a fine of ₹2,000, failing the payment of which, he has to undergo one more year of imprisonment and Anandaraj was sentenced to five years RI with a fine of ₹1,000, failure to paying which will attract another six months of imprisonment.
