= 1985 in Sri Lanka =

- Decades: 1970s; 1980s; 1990s; 2000s
- See also: Other events of 1985; Timeline of Sri Lankan history

The following lists events that happened during 1985 in Sri Lanka.

== Incumbents ==
- President – J. R. Jayewardene
- Prime Minister – Ranasinghe Premadasa
- Chief Justice – Suppiah Sharvananda

== Events ==
- Sri Lankan Civil War
  - Eelam War I
- 14 May – Anuradhapura massacre: 146 civilians are killed in Anuradhapura during a massacre carried out by the Liberation Tigers of Tamil Eelam. This was the largest massacre of Sinhalese civilians by the LTTE to date.
- 25 August–22 September – The Indian cricket team tours in Sri Lanka.
- 8–10 November – 1985 Muttur massacre: In an attack coordinated by the Sri Lankan Military, leaving 30–100 Tamil civilians and militants are killed in the town of Muttur

== Notes ==
a. Gunaratna, Rohan. (1998). Pg.353, Sri Lanka's Ethnic Crisis and National Security, Colombo: South Asian Network on Conflict Research. ISBN 955-8093-00-9

== Sources ==
- THE NORTHEAST SECRETARIAT ON HUMAN RIGHTS (NESOHR). Massacres of Tamils (1956-2008)p. 14–15. Chennai: Manitham Publishers, 2009. ISBN 978-81-909737-0-0
