= 1986 in Sri Lanka =

- Decades: 1970s; 1980s; 1990s; 2000s
- See also: Other events of 1986; Timeline of Sri Lankan history

The following lists events that happened during 1986 in Sri Lanka.

== Incumbents ==
- President – J. R. Jayewardene
- Prime Minister – Ranasinghe Premadasa
- Chief Justice – Suppiah Sharvananda

== Events ==
- Sri Lankan Civil War
  - Eelam War I
- 19 February – Akkaraipattu massacre: Approximately 80 Sri Lankan Tamil farm workers were allegedly killed by the Sri Lankan Army personnel and their bodies were found burnt in the Eastern Province of Sri Lanka.
- 30 March–6 April – The 1986 Asia Cup is hosted in Sri Lanka. Sri Lanka wins, beating Pakistan in the final.
- 3 May – 21 people are killed and 41 are injured in an LTTE bombing of an Air Lanka flight set to fly to the Maldives. The attack was condemned by France and the United Kingdom.

== Notes ==
a. Gunaratna, Rohan. (1998). Pg.353, Sri Lanka's Ethnic Crisis and National Security, Colombo: South Asian Network on Conflict Research. ISBN 955-8093-00-9
