= 1983 in Sri Lanka =

- Decades: 1970s; 1980s; 1990s; 2000s
- See also: Other events of 1983; Timeline of Sri Lankan history

The following lists events that happened during 1983 in Sri Lanka.

== Incumbents ==
- President – J. R. Jayewardene
- Prime Minister – Ranasinghe Premadasa
- Chief Justice – Neville Samarakoon

== Events ==
- Sri Lankan Civil War
  - Eelam War I
- 23 July
  - Four Four Bravo ambush: A 15-man patrol of the Sri Lankan Army is ambushed by the Liberation Tigers of Tamil Eelam (LTTE) in Thirunelveli. 13 of its members were killed. The ambush was a watershed event for ethnic relations in Sri Lanka and would be one of the immediate causes for the Sri Lankan Civil War.
  - The 25-year long Sri Lankan Civil War begins, following rising ethnic tensions between the minority Tamil and majority Sinhalese communities of Sri Lanka.
- 24 July – Thirunelveli massacre: In response to the ambush the day before, truckloads of Sri Lankan soldiers leave the Palaly camp at 4:30 AM, smashing all the shops on the way to Thirunelveli. Over 60 Tamil civilians in Jaffna were subsequently massacred by the rampaging army in revenge. Over 100 Tamil civilians were injured and over 100 homes and shops were damaged or burnt. Whereas the prior killing of soldiers was instantly reported in local Sri Lankan media, the subsequent massacre of civilians was suppressed from the media and not reported, and remained mostly unknown to the Sinhalese public.
- 24–30 July – Black July: Following the ambush of the Sri Lankan Army patrol, a series of violent anti-Tamil pogroms and riots erupt across the island. They were some of the most violent ethnic riots in Sri Lanka's history, with rioters claiming the lives of over 1000 ethnic Tamils. Roughly 150,000 people were left homeless with many businesses burnt. Rioters included Sinhalese mobs, Sri Lankan Army soldiers and Sri Lanka police officers.

== Notes ==
a. Gunaratna, Rohan. (1998). Pg.353, Sri Lanka's Ethnic Crisis and National Security, Colombo: South Asian Network on Conflict Research. ISBN 955-8093-00-9
