= 1948 in Sri Lanka =

- Decades: 1940s
- See also: Other events of 1948; Timeline of Sri Lankan history

The following lists notable events that took place during 1948 in Sri Lanka. 1948 saw Sri Lanka, then known as British Ceylon, regain its independence from the British Empire, thus establishing the Dominion of Ceylon.

== Incumbents ==
=== British Ceylon (until 4 February) ===
Governor
Henry Monck-Mason Moore (Until 4 February)

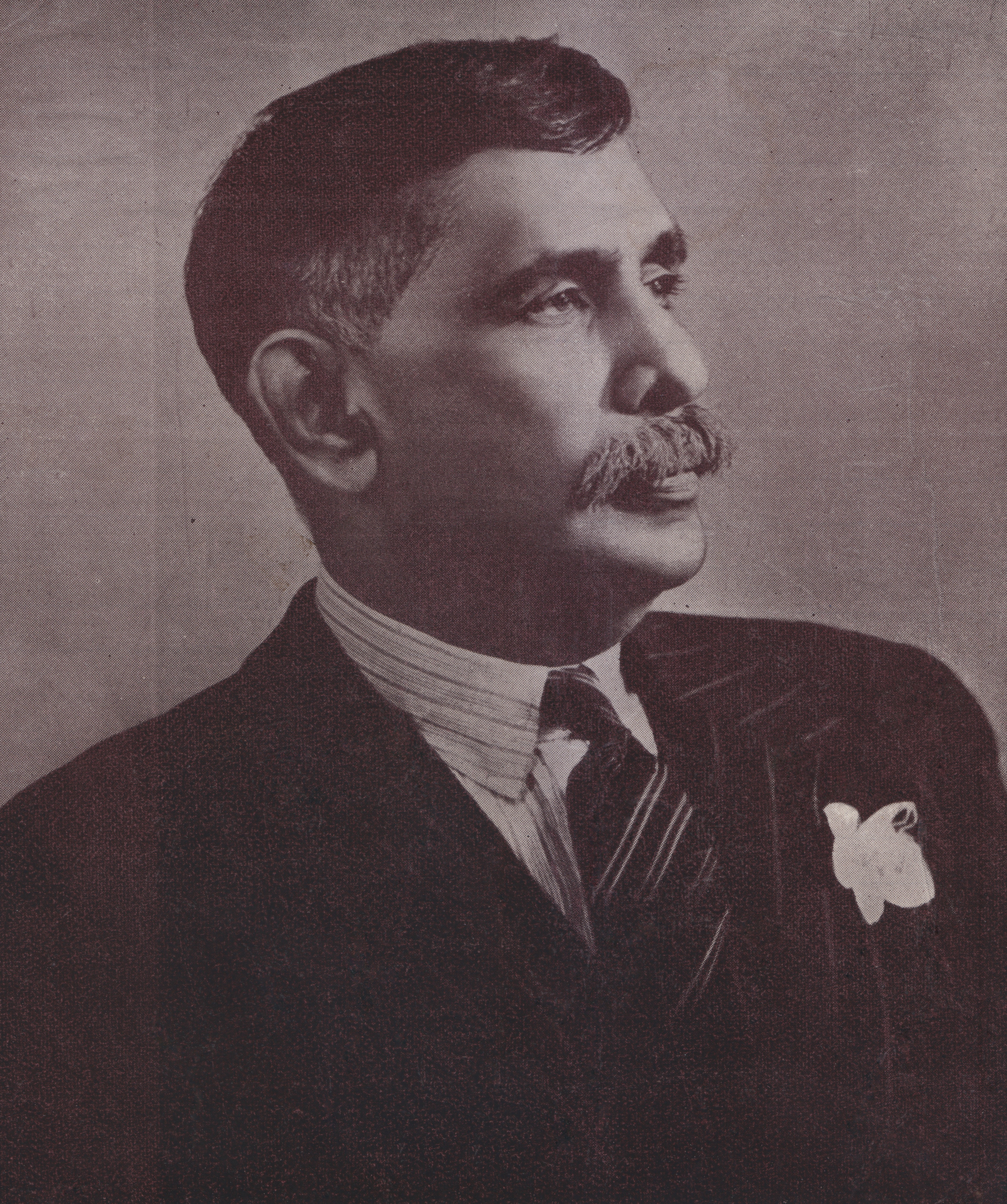
Prime Minister
D. S. Senanayake

Speaker of the Parliament
Alexander Francis Molamure

Chief Justice
John Curtois Howard

Leader of the Opposition
N. M. Perera

=== Dominion of Ceylon (from 4 February) ===
Governor-General
Henry Monck-Mason Moore (from 4 February)

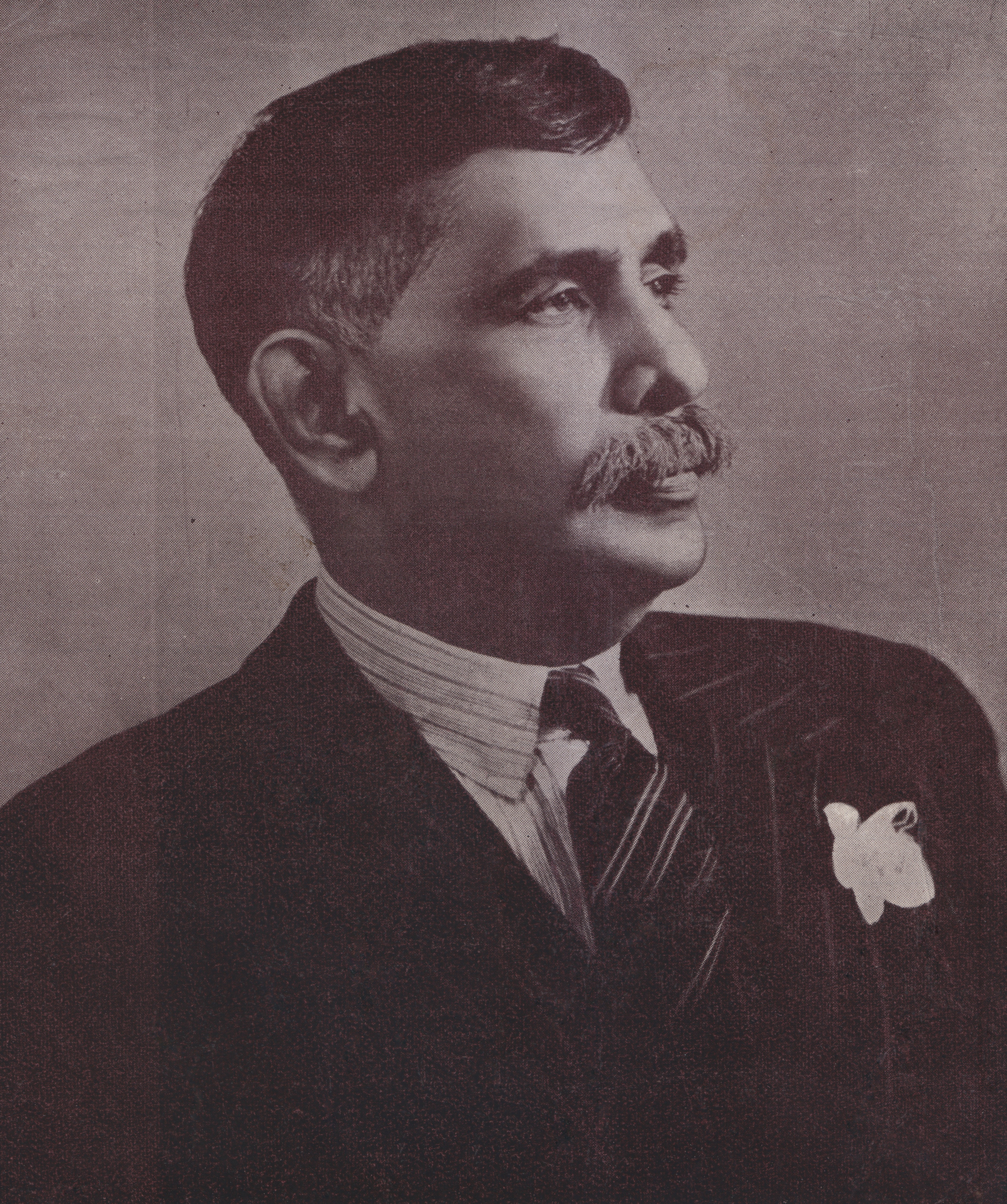
Prime Minister
D. S. Senanayake

Speaker of the Parliament
Alexander Francis Molamure

Leader of the Opposition
N. M. Perera

== Events ==
=== February ===
- 4 February – British Ceylon is disestablished as Sri Lanka gains its independence as the Dominion of Ceylon.
- 23 February – The film Kapati Arakshakaya is released.

=== March ===
- 19 March – The Australian cricket team stops by in Ceylon, en route to England during their 1948 tour of England, where they played a one-day single-innings match—not limited overs—against the Ceylon national team at the Colombo Oval.

=== May ===
- 22 May – The film Divya Premaya is released.

=== June ===
- 4 July – Several Ceylonese individuals are included in the list of British 1948 Birthday Honours.

=== July ===
- 29 July–14 August – Ceylon competes in the 1948 Summer Olympics for the first time in London, sending 7 athletes.
- 31 July – Ceylonese athlete Duncan White wins the silver medal in the Men's 400 metres hurdles, becoming the first Ceylonese athlete to win an Olympic medal.

=== August ===
- 20 August – The controversial Ceylon Citizenship Act is passed in parliarment.

=== November ===
- 15 November – The Ceylon Citizenship Act becomes law, qualifying only about 5,000 Indian Tamils for citizenship. More than 700,000 people, about 11% of the population, are denied citizenship and rendered stateless.

=== December ===
- 3 December – The film Veradunu Kurumanama is released.

== Births ==
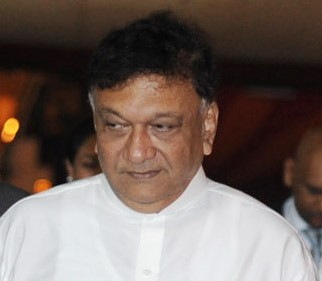
Lakshman Kiriella

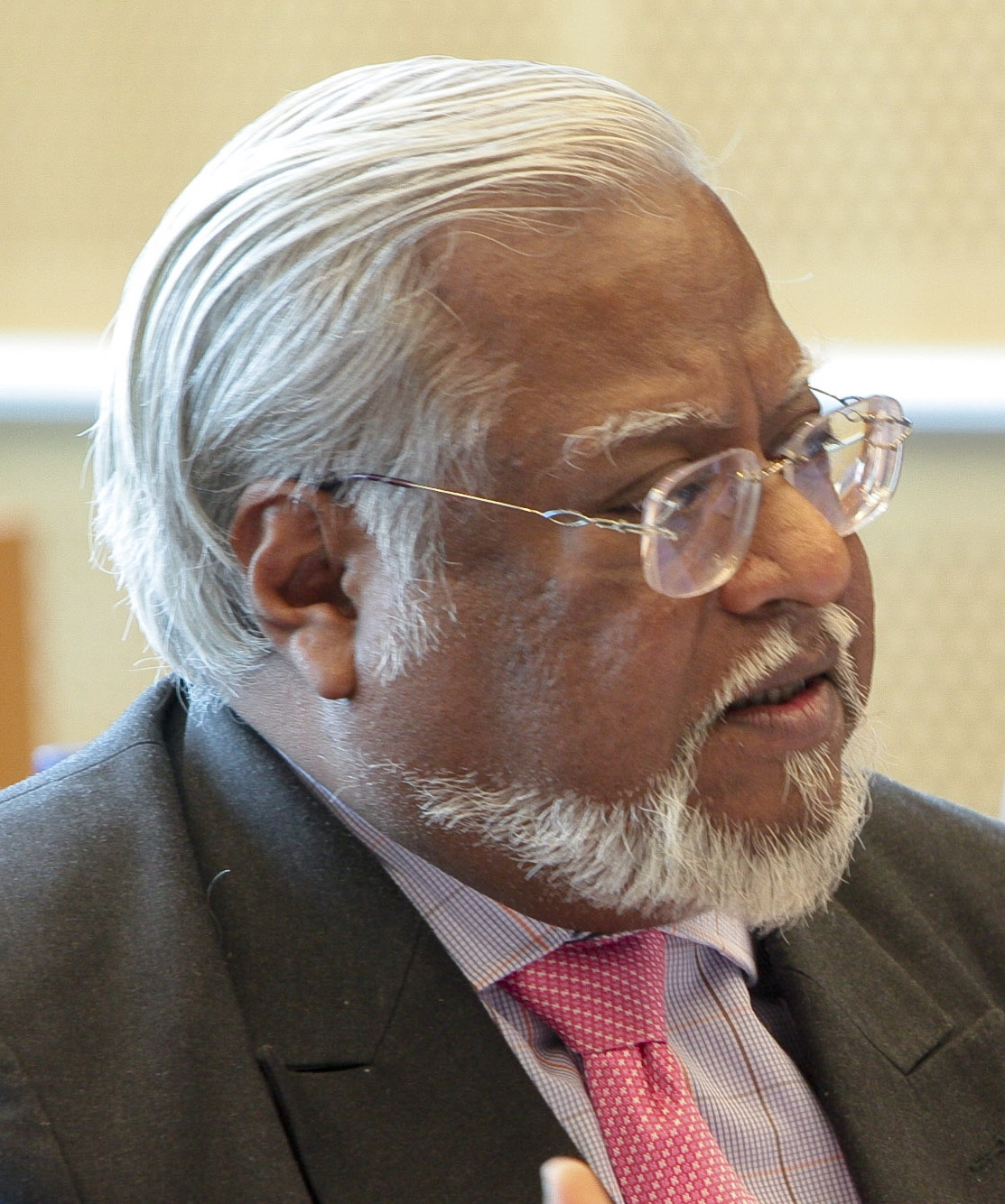
Nirj Deva

Rukman Senanayake

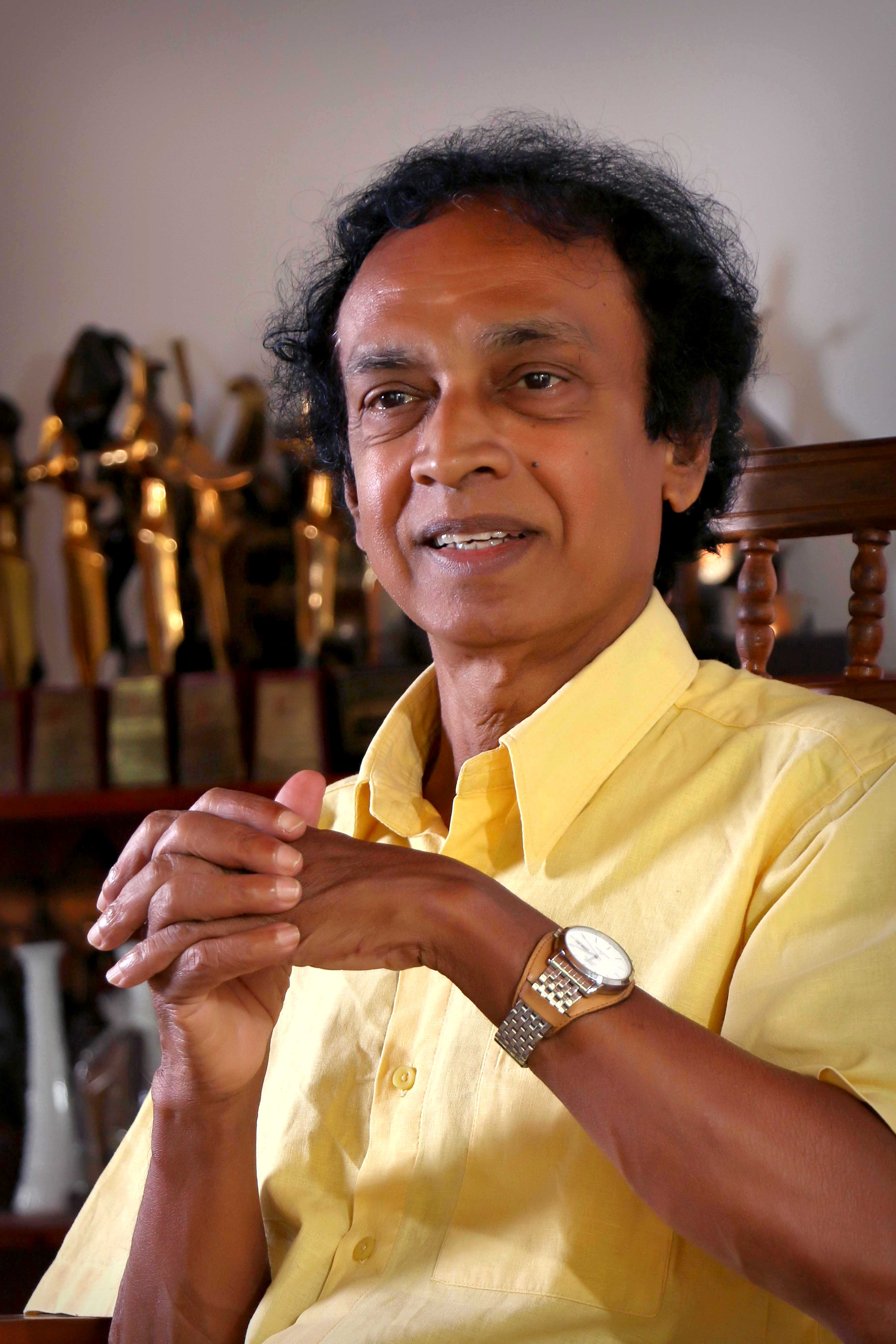
Suminda Sirisena

=== February ===
- 2 February – Lakshman Kiriella, lawyer, politician
- 21 February – Sumana Amarasinghe, actress (d. 2022)

=== April ===
- 13 April – Arul Pragasam, activist, rebel (d. 2019)
- 24 April – Gangodawila Soma Thero, Buddhist monk (d. 2003)

=== May ===
- 11 May – Nirj Deva, Sri Lankan-British politician

=== June ===
- 8 June – D. A. M. R. Samarasekara, admiral
- 12 June – Jayalath Manoratne, actor (d. 2020)
- 21 June – Rukman Senanayake, politician

=== July ===
- 4 July
  - Wimal Kumara de Costa, actor (d. 2016)
  - Suminda Sirisena, actor (d. 2023)
- 11 July – Duleep De Chickera, Anglican Bishop of Colombo
- 17 July – Cletus Mendis, actor
- 22 July – Chandran Rutnam, filmmaker, entrepreneur
- 24 July – K. Sri Dhammaratana, Buddhist monk

=== October ===
- 23 October – M. H. M. Ashraff, lawyer, politician, founder and leader of the Sri Lanka Muslim Congress (d. 2000)

=== Unknown date ===
- Sabaratnam Arulkumaran, physician
- Maru Sira, criminal (d. 1975)

== Deaths ==
- 6 February – Bernard Henry Bourdillon, 64, British colonial administrator (b. 1883)
