= Murugesapillai Maheswaran =

Murugesapillai Maheswaran (born October 12, 1939) is a mathematician, astrophysicist and educator. He was born in Colombo, Sri Lanka, and emigrated to the United States of America in 1985. Maheswaran has lived in Wausau, Wisconsin since 1986.

== Education ==
Maheswaran received his primary and secondary school education at Royal College, Colombo. Subsequently, he entered the University of Ceylon to pursue studies in mathematics and the physical sciences. He graduated with First Class Honours and was awarded the Ceylon Government University Scholarship in 1962 for the Most Meritorious Performance in Mathematics among graduating students in all the universities in Sri Lanka. In 1964, he proceeded to the University of Cambridge, England, for postgraduate studies in mathematical astrophysics at the Department of Applied Mathematics and Theoretical Physics and was a member of Churchill College, Cambridge. His research supervisors were Professors Roger Tayler and Nigel Weiss. His dissertation was on Rotation, Circulation and Magnetic Fields in Stars and he received his Ph.D. degree in 1968.

== Career ==
Maheswaran's career consisted mostly of full-time teaching positions and he worked on important research projects during sabbatical breaks and summer vacations. He was as an Assistant Lecturer in Mathematics at the University of Ceylon from 1962 to 1964 and returned as a lecturer in 1968. In 1976, he was appointed as Professor and Head of the Department of Mathematics at the University of Peradeniya. In 1984/85, he also served as the head of the Mathematics and Astronomy sections of the Institute of Fundamental Studies in Sri Lanka. In September 1985, he took up a teaching position in the Mathematics Department at Southern Illinois University Carbondale, USA. In 1986 he moved to the University of Wisconsin Marathon County, which became the University of Wisconsin Stevens Point at Wausau in 2018 and was promoted as Professor of Mathematics in 1992. He retired in 2007 and is a Professor Emeritus at UWMC. Maheswaran has done research or taught at several international academic institutions. In 1973/74, he was a Research Fellow in Astrophysics at the University of Liège in Belgium. In 1982/83, he was a Visiting Professor of Mathematics and Acting Dean of the School of Physical Sciences at the University of Port Harcourt in Nigeria. During the period from 1973 to 1979, he spent several semesters at the International Center for Theoretical Physics in Trieste, Italy. He is a member of the American Astronomical Society, the International Astronomical Union, the Astronomical Society of India and the Sri Lanka Association for the Advancement of Science. Previously, he was a Fellow of the Royal Astronomical Society, England, and a member of the Wisconsin Section of the Mathematical Society of America. His pedagogical work involved the teaching of undergraduate mathematics with focus on the use of hypertext and hypermedia materials.

== Research ==
Maheswaran has carried out research in several different subject areas. He has published many research papers and pedagogical articles in addition to presentations at meetings and conferences. A list of selected publications is given in his curriculum vitae. In mathematical astrophysics, he worked in the areas of rotating magnetic stars, stellar magnetohydrodynamics, stellar winds and disks. His research contributions included (i) the development of a second order Lagrange Polynomial expansion method to study circulations in rotating stars (ii) computations to study the evolution of magnetic fields in rotating stars (iii) derivation of limits on surface magnetic fields in rotating stars, (iv) formulating equations and procedure to follow the evolution of rotation and magnetic fields of stars with winds and polar outflows, and (v) he has collaborated with Joseph Cassinelli of the University of Wisconsin-Madison and John Brown of the University of Glasgow to develop models for disks around rotating magnetic stars. Furthermore, Maheswaran has carried out research with S. G. Canagaratna of Ohio Northern University in the area of Chemical Thermodynamics and has been a coauthor with him of several papers on the analysis of multicomponent mixtures and solutions. In particular, they derived equations to prove that if the partial molar property of one component of a multicomponent mixture or solution is known then the partial molar property of all the other components can be determined. Maheswaran has also published papers on the properties of equations related to the Beltrami equation. Several of his research contributions have been cited in books and articles. Some of his more important research papers are listed in the ensuing section entitled Articles and a few selected citations of his research contributions are included in the section on References.

== Articles ==
The following is a brief list of selected research papers in which Maheswaran is an author:

- Maheswaran, M. (1968)."On Meridian Circulation". Monthly Notices Royal Astronomical Society. 140:93-107.. Bibcode:1968MNRAS.140...93M.. doi:10.1093/mnras/140.1.93.
- Maheswaran, M. (1969). "Effects of Prescribed Circulations on Magnetic Fields". Monthly Notices Royal Astronomical Society. 145:197-216.. Bibcode:1969MNRAS.145..197M.. doi:10.1093/mnras/145.2.197.
- Maheswaran, M and de Silva H. A. B. M. (1973). "Magnetic Fields in Rapidly Rotating Stars". Monthly Notices Royal Astronomical Society. 162:289-293.. Bibcode:1973MNRAS.162..289M.. doi:10.1093/mnras/162.3.289.
- Maheswaran, M. (1974). "On the Magnetic Fields of Upper Main Sequence Stars". Astronomy and Astrophysics. 37:169-178.. Bibcode:1974A&A....37..169M
- Chanmugam, Ganesar and Maheswaran, Murugesapillai. (1975)."Spin Down of Pulsars". Publications of the Astronomical Society of Japan. 27:307-310.. Bibcode:1975PASJ...27..307C.
- Canagaratna, S. Gnanaraj and Maheswaran, Murugesapillai. (1980). "Determination of Partial Molar Quantities in Multicomponent Systems". Journal of the Chemical Society, Faraday Transactions II. 76:1119-1127.. doi:10.1039/F29807601119.
- Canagaratna, S. Gnanaraj and Maheswaran, Murugesapillai. (1984). "Determination of Mean Molar and Molar Excess Quantities in Multicomponent Systems". Journal of the Chemical Society, Faraday Transactions II. 80:261-265.. doi:10.1039/F29848000261.
- Maheswaran, M. (1986). "On Solutions of curl a = ka and Force-Free Magnetic Fields". Journal of Physics A: Mathematical and Theoretical. 19:L761-L762.. doi:10.1088/0305-4470/19/13/001.
- Maheswaran, M. (1987). "The Equation curl B = kB and Magnetic Fields". Journal of Physics A: Mathematical and Theoretical. 20:L195-L196.. doi:10.1088/0305-4470/20/4/002.
- Maheswaran, Murugesapillai and Cassinelli, Joseph P. (1988). "On the Surface Magnetic Fields of Rapidly Rotating Stars with Winds". Astrophysical Journal. 335:931-939.. Bibcode:1988ApJ...335..931M.. doi:10.1086/166978
- Maheswaran, Murugesapillai and Cassinelli, Joseph P. (1992). "Constraints on the Surface Magnetic Fields of Hot Stars with Winds". Astrophysical Journal. 386:695-702.. Bibcode:1992ApJ...386..695M.. doi:10.1086/171049
- Maheswaran, Murugesapillai and Cassinelli, Joseph. (1994). "Rotation and Magnetic Fields during the Evolution of Massive Stars through B[e] and Wolf-Rayet Phases". Astrophysical Journal. 421:718-732.. Bibcode:1994ApJ...421..718M.. doi:10.1086/173684.
- J. P. Cassinelli, J. C. Brown, M. Maheswaran, N. A. Miller and D. C. Telfer. (2002). "A Magnetically Torqued Disk Model for Be Stars". Astrophysical Journal. 578: 951-966.. Bibcode:2002ApJ...578..951C.. DOI:10.1086/342654
- M. Maheswaran. (2003). "Magnetic Rotator Winds and Keplerian Disks in Hot Stars". The Astrophysical Journal. 592:1156-1172.. Bibcode:2003ApJ...592.1156M.. doi:10.1086/375797.
- M. Maheswaran. (2005). "A Magnetic Rotator Wind-Disk Model for Be Stars". ASP Conference Series. vol. 337, pp 259–263 The Nature and Evolution of Disks around Hot Stars, ed. R. Ignace & K. Gayley (San Francisco: ASP).. Bibcode:2005ASPC..337..259M.
- J. C. Brown, J. P. Cassinelli and M. Maheswaran. (2008). "Magnetically Fed Hot Star Keplerian Disks with Slow Outflow". The Astrophysical Journal. 688:1320-1325.. Bibcode:2008ApJ...688.1320B.. doi:10.1086/592558
- M. Maheswaran and J. P. Cassinelli. (2009). "Protodiscs around Hot Magnetic Rotator Stars". Monthly Notices of the Royal Astronomical Society. 394:415-426.. Bibcode:2009MNRAS.394..415M.. doi:10.1111/j.1365-2966.2008.14364.x.
- S. G. Canagaratna and M. Maheswaran.(2011). "Equations for the Evaluation of Thermodynamic Quantities for Multicomponent Systems". Journal of Chemical & Engineering Data. 56(6):276-2769.. doi:10.1021/je101089u.
- S. G. Canagaratna and M. Maheswaran. (2013). "Thermodynamics on the Molality Scale". Journal of Chemical Education, 90(5):598-603.. doi:10.1021/ed300127n

== Books ==
- Equations for Rotating Magnetic Stars, their Winds and Circumstellar Disks (Researchgate, 2017).
- Equations for Molar Quantities in Multicomponent Mixtures and Solutions (Researchgate, 2021).
