= Gayas Christopher =

Sri Lankan cricketer (born 1987)

Gayas Christopher (born 4 February 1987) is a Sri Lankan cricketer. He is a right-handed batsman and leg-break bowler who plays for Sri Lanka Navy Sports Club. He was born in Negombo.

Christopher made his first-class debut for the side against Seeduwa Raddoluwa Sports Club in the 2009–10 season. From the opening order, he scored 7 runs in the first innings in which he batted, and 52 runs in the second.
