= Don Carlin Gunawardena =

Sri Lankan botanist (1899–1979)

- Born: April 27, 1899; Sri Lanka
- Died: 15 September 1979 (aged 80)
- Education: St. Joseph's College, Colombo; Ceylon University College; University College London; University of London
- Known for: Etymological and historical accounts of Sri Lankan flora and fauna
- Scientific career
- Fields: Botany
- Workplaces: St. Joseph's College, Colombo; Royal College, Colombo; Department of Education, Ceylon; Vidyodaya University
- Notable students: Harold de Soysa, J. R. Jayewardene

Don Carlin Gunawardena (April 27, 1899 – September 15, 1979) was a Sri Lankan botanist, Emeritus Professor of Botany, and Head of the Department of Science at Vidyodaya University, Ceylon (later renamed as University of Sri Jayewardenepura). He was known for his etymological and historical accounts of Sri Lankan flora and fauna and other works on tropical taxonomy.

== Career ==
After a student career at St. Joseph's College, Colombo, Gunawardena served as a member of its staff between 1919 and 1924. During this time, he matriculated at Ceylon University College as one of its first undergraduates, where he read Latin, Greek, and botany to graduate with a Bachelor of Arts degree in 1921.

In 1924, Major H. L. Reed MA (Cantab.) acquired Gunawardena for the ‘Remove C Form’ created for students wishing to read Botany at Royal College, Colombo in preparation for a career in medicine. As head of this newly formed Botany Department, he was the founding President of the Natural History Society. He also served as the Vice-President of the Senior Literary and Historical Associations, Senior Vice-President of the Social League, House Master of Boake, Manager of the Book Department (from 1936), and Vice-President of the Master's Guild.

Between 1931 and 1933, Gunawardena departed for London on study leave from Royal College. In 1932 he was awarded the Diploma in Education (Oxford), and in the same year obtained the Certificate for Practical Efficiency in Teaching (Cantab.). While in London, he presented his MSc thesis, ‘Studies in the Botanical Works of John Ray’ to University College London in 1934 and in the same was elected a Fellow of the Linnean Society of London.

Gunawardena returned to service at Royal College until promoted in the late 1930s to Assistant Director of Education stationed at Kandy. After retirement from public service, he dedicated his efforts to his Doctoral thesis, The botanical history of Ceylon, which was eventually presented to the University of London in 1963. Upon return from London with his doctorate, Gunawardena was invited to join the then newly formed Vidyodaya University (later renamed as University of Sri Jayewardenepura) to head its Department of Botany; a post which he held until his death at the age of eighty.

Royal College, Colombo annually presents the 'Dr D. C. Gunawardena Memorial Prize for Science (Grade 12)' in memoriam.

== Principal work ==
Gunawardena's principal work was Genera et Species Plantarum Zeylaniae, a volume published in 1968 on the etymological and historical accounts of Sri Lankan flora and fauna. The work was an adaptation of the third chapter of his University of London doctoral thesis, and had a foreword by one of his tutors, Sir Edward James Salisbury, one time Quain Professor of Botany at University College London, and Director of the Royal Botanic Gardens, Kew. The volume examines the origins and meanings of the Latin and native names accorded to the flora and fauna of Sri Lanka and is structured in the nature of a dictionary elaborated with bibliographical accounts, local folklore, native uses, and their historical significance. The work is identified as having wider appeal to readers of other Eastern countries, since Linnaeus, who gave fixed names to plants, used Ceylonese plants as types for many of his species in Flora Zeylanica (1747), the first Linnaean Flora of an Eastern country.
