= Dinesh Lalinda =

Sri Lankan cricketer (born 1979)

Dinesh Lalinda (full name Thotabaddadura Dinesh Lalinda Silva; born 28 February 1979) was a Sri Lankan cricketer. He was a right-handed batsman and right-arm medium-fast bowler who played for Panadura Sports Club. He was born in Nagoda.

Lalinda made a single first-class appearance for the team, during the 2003–04 season, against Sebastianites. From the tailend, he scored 7 runs in the first innings in which he batted, and 2 not out in the second, as Panadura lost the match by an innings margin.

Lalinda took bowling figures of 0-23 from 6 overs.
