= Waruna Shantha =

Sri Lankan cricketer (born 1980)

Waruna Shantha (full name Gagabadawatta Arachilage Lakpriya Waruna Shantha; born 16 December 1980) is a former Sri Lankan cricketer. He was a right-handed batsman and right-arm medium-fast bowler who played for Lankan Cricket Club. He was born in Boralla.

Shantha made his cricketing debut during the 2005-06 Twenty20 Cup against Galle, though it was another 18 months before he made another appearance for the side, in the following season's competition.

Shantha's first-class debut came during the 2007–08 season, against Panadura Sports Club. He played seven matches in the competition, scoring 151 runs, and making a top score of 60 runs, the only first-class half-century in his career.

He continued to play for the side in the Premier Limited Overs Tournament until the 2009–10 season.
