= Bogahalanda Grama Niladhari Division =

Bogahalanda
- Grama Niladhari Division
- Interactive map of Bogahalanda
- Coordinates: 7.218888°N 80.798508°E
- Country: Sri Lanka
- Province: Central Province
- District: Nuwara Eliya District
- Divisional Secretariat: Hanguranketha Divisional Secretariat
- Electoral District: Nuwara-Eliya Electoral District
- Polling Division: Hanguranketha Polling Division

Area
  - Total: 1.39 km^{2} (0.54 sq mi)
- Elevation: 356 m (1,168 ft)

Population (2012)
  - Total: 672
  - Density: 483/km^{2} (1,250/sq mi)
- ISO 3166 code: LK-2306035

Bogahalanda

Bogahalanda Grama Niladhari Division is a Grama Niladhari Division of the Hanguranketha Divisional Secretariat of Nuwara Eliya District of Central Province, Sri Lanka. It has Grama Niladhari Division Code 485A.

Bogahalanda is a surrounded by the Welapahala, Hakuruthale, Karalliyadda, Welikada and Thennalanda Grama Niladhari Divisions.

== Demographics ==
=== Ethnicity ===
The Bogahalanda Grama Niladhari Division has a Sinhalese majority (100.0%). In comparison, the Hanguranketha Divisional Secretariat (which contains the Bogahalanda Grama Niladhari Division) has a Sinhalese majority (86.4%)

Ethnicity in Bogahalanda
1. Sinhalese (100.0%)
2. Other (0.00%)

=== Religion ===
The Bogahalanda Grama Niladhari Division has a Buddhist majority (100.0%). In comparison, the Hanguranketha Divisional Secretariat (which contains the Bogahalanda Grama Niladhari Division) has a Buddhist majority (86.2%) and a significant Hindu population (12.6%)

Religion in Bogahalanda
1. Buddhist (100.0%)
2. Other (0.00%)
