= Mahesh (name) =

The name Mahesh (/mahe-sh/) is a short version of a name of Sanskrit origin, Maheswara or Umamaheswara, meaning "great ruler" (Mahaa + Ishwar). It is a popular name for Hindu boys as it is one of the names of the Hindu deity Shiva.

People with the name include:

== Those known by the single name ==
- Mahesh (Malayalam actor), Indian Malayalam film actor
- Mahesh (Tamil actor), Indian Tamil film actor

== Sport ==
- Mahesh Bhupathi (born 1974), Indian tennis player
- Mahesh Bogahalanda (born 1979), Sri Lankan cricketer
- Mahesh Chhetri (born 1988), Nepali cricketer
- Mahesh Gawli (born 1980), Indian footballer
- Mahesh Hemantha, Sri Lankan cricketer
- Mahesh Mangaonkar (born 1994), Indian squash player
- Mahesh Rawat (born 1985), Indian cricketer
- Mahesh Rodrigo (1928 - 2011), Sri Lankan cricketer and rugby player
- Yo Mahesh (born 1987), Indian cricketer

== Entertainment ==
- Mahesh Babu (born 1975), Indian film actor
- Mahesh Aney, Indian cinematographer
- Mahesh Bhatt (born 1946), Indian film director, producer and screenwriter
- Mahesh Shetty Indian Television and Film Actor
- Mahesh Dattani (born 1958), Indian director, actor and writer
- Mahesh Elkunchwar (born 1939), Indian playwright
- Mahesh Kothare, Indian actor, director and producer
- Mahesh Mahadevan (1955–2002), Indian film music composer
- Mahesh Manjrekar (born 1953), Indian director, actor, writer and producer
- Mahesh Thakur, Indian actor
- Erode Mahesh, Indian actor and television personality

== Other ==
- Maharishi Mahesh Yogi (1917–2008), Indian spiritual leader
- Mahesh Das or Maheshdas Bhat (1528–1586), real name of Birbal, Grand Vizier in the court of Mughal emperor Akbar
- Mahesh Kumar Kanodia (1937 - 2020), Indian politician, member of the 14th Lok Sabha of India
- Mahesh Madhavan (born 1963/64), Indian businessman, CEO of Bacardi
- Mahesh Rangarajan (born 1964), Indian author and historian
- Inspector Mahesh Jadhav, a fictional character in Zapatlela film series
