= 1988 North Eastern Provincial Council election =

- 19 November 1988

71 seats across 1 provincial council
	First party	Second party
	EPRLF	SLMC
Leader	Varatharajah Perumal	M. H. M. Ashraff
Party	EPRLF	SLMC
Popular vote	215,230	168,038
Percentage	55.00%	42.94%
Councillors	41	17
Councils	1	0
Chief Minister before election
None
Elected Chief Minister
Varatharajah Perumal
EPRLF

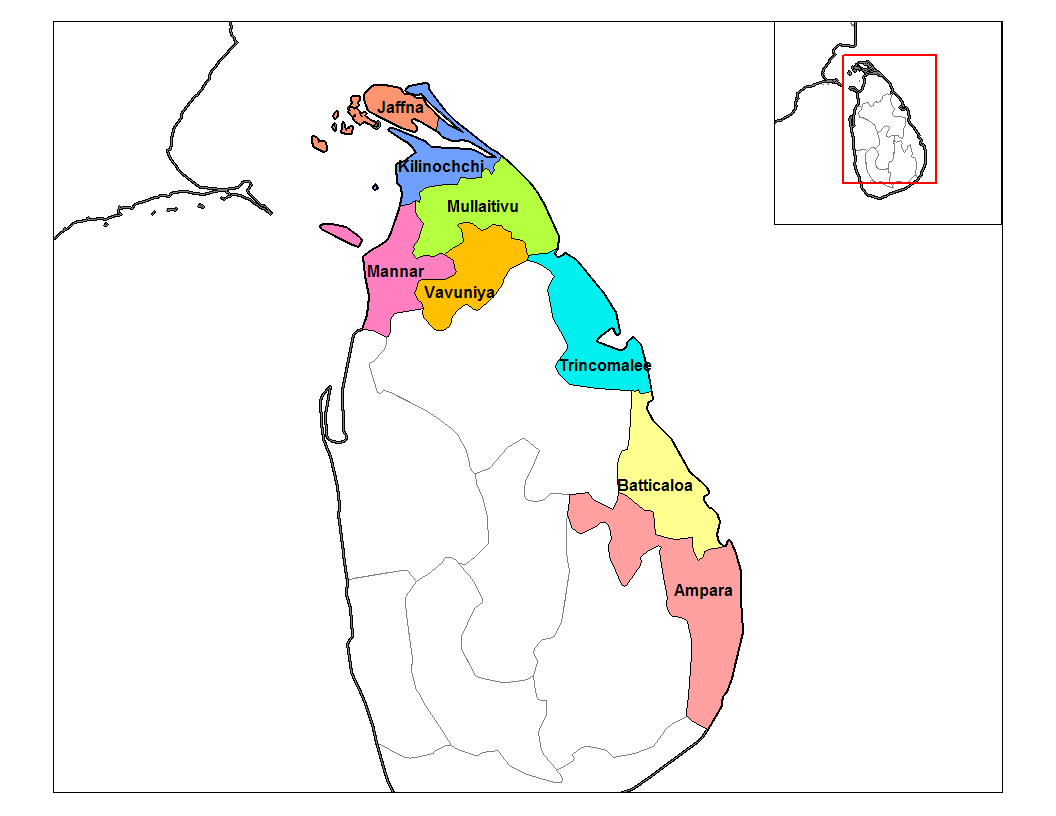
North Eastern Province, Sri Lanka, 1988-2006

Provincial Council elections were held on 19 November 1988 to elect members to Sri Lanka’s North Eastern Provincial Council.

== Background ==
The Indo-Lanka Accord signed on 29 July 1987 required the Sri Lankan government to devolve powers to the provinces and, in the meantime, to merge the Northern and Eastern provinces into one administrative unit.

On 14 November 1987 the Sri Lankan Parliament passed the 13th Amendment to the 1978 Constitution of Sri Lanka and the Provincial Councils Act No 42 of 1987, establishing provincial councils. On September 2 and 8 1988 President Jayewardene issued proclamations enabling the Northern and Eastern provinces to be one administrative unit administered by one elected Council.

The first elections for provincial councils took place on 28 April 1988 in North Central, North Western, Sabaragamuwa, and Uva provinces. Elections in the newly merged North Eastern Province were held on 19 November 1988.

== Results ==
=== Overall ===
Party	Eastern			Northern			Total		
Party	Votes	%	Seats	Votes	%	Seats	Votes	%	Seats
Eelam People's Revolutionary Liberation Front	215,230	55.00%	17	–	–	24	215,230	55.00%	41
Sri Lanka Muslim Congress	168,038	42.94%	17	–	–	–	168,038	42.94%	17
United National Party	8,056	2.06%	1	–	–	–	8,056	2.06%	1
Eelam National Democratic Liberation Front	–	–	–	–	–	12	–	–	12
Total	391,324	100.00%	35	–	–	36	391,324	100.00%	71

=== Ampara District ===
Party	Votes per Polling Division				Total Votes	%	Seats
Party	Ampara	Kalmunai	Pottuvil	Sammanthurai	Total Votes	%	Seats
Sri Lanka Muslim Congress	40	26,441	34,972	28,983	90,436	63.03%	9
Eelam People's Revolutionary Liberation Front	20	12,626	25,140	7,968	45,754	31.89%	4
United National Party	5,338	111	1,704	147	7,300	5.09%	1
Valid Votes	5,398	39,178	61,816	37,098	143,490	100.00%	14
Rejected Votes	219	460	932	1,020	2,631		
Total Polled	5,617	39,638	62,748	38,118	146,121		
Registered Electors	94,068	44,075	82,833	44,975	265,951		
Turnout (%)	5.97%	89.93%	75.75%	84.75%	54.94%		

=== Batticaloa District ===
Party	Votes per Polling Division			Total Votes	%	Seats
Party	Batticaloa	Kalkudah	Paddiruppu	Total Votes	%	Seats
Eelam People's Revolutionary Liberation Front	46,006	32,546	48,394	126,946	74.76%	8
Sri Lanka Muslim Congress	29,594	12,331	175	42,100	24.79%	3
United National Party	476	194	86	756	0.45%	0
Valid Votes	76,076	45,071	48,655	169,802	100.00%	11
Rejected Votes	1,495	629	610	2,734		
Total Polled	77,571	45,700	49,265	172,536		
Registered Electors	100,536	60,288	56,452	217,276		
Turnout (%)	77.16%	75.80%	87.27%	79.41%		

=== Jaffna District ===
The Eelam People's Revolutionary Liberation Front won all 19 seats uncontested.

=== Kilinochchi District ===
The Eelam National Democratic Liberation Front won all 3 seats uncontested.

=== Mannar District ===
The Eelam People's Revolutionary Liberation Front won all 5 seats uncontested.

=== Mullaitivu District ===
The Eelam National Democratic Liberation Front won all 5 seats uncontested.

=== Trincomalee District ===
Party	Votes per Polling Division			Total Votes	%	Seats
Party	Mutur	Seruwila	Trincomalee	Total Votes	%	Seats
Eelam People's Revolutionary Liberation Front	12,311	4,840	25,379	42,530	54.50%	5
Sri Lanka Muslim Congress	24,006	3,764	7,732	35,502	45.50%	5
Valid Votes	36,317	8,604	33,111	78,032	100.00%	10
Rejected Votes	810	295	1,272	2,377		
Total Polled	37,127	8,899	34,383	80,409		
Registered Electors	48,570	47,693	56,026	152,289		
Turnout (%)	76.44%	18.66%	61.37%	52.80%		

=== Vavuniya District ===
The Eelam National Democratic Liberation Front won all 4 seats uncontested.

== Aftermath ==
On 10 December 1988 Annamalai Varatharajah Perumal of the EPRLF became the first Chief Minister of the North Eastern Provincial Council.

On 1 March 1990, just as the Indian Peace Keeping Force were preparing to withdraw from Sri Lanka, Permual moved a motion in the North Eastern Provincial Council declaring an independent Eelam. President Premadasa reacted to Permual's UDI by dissolving the provincial council and imposing direct rule on the province.

On 14 July 2006, after a long campaign against the merger of the Northern and Eastern provinces, the Janatha Vimukthi Peramuna, a Sinhalese nationalist political party, filed three separate petitions with the Supreme Court of Sri Lanka requesting a separate Provincial Council for the East. On 16 October 2006 the Supreme Court ruled that the proclamations issued by President Jayewardene in September 1988 were null and void and had no legal effect. The North Eastern Province was formally demerged into the Northern and Eastern provinces on 1 January 2007.

The north-east of Sri Lanka was ruled directly from Colombo until May 2008 when elections were held in the demerged Eastern Province. However, the Northern Province continues to be ruled from Government.
