= Wenura Caldera =

Sri Lankan cricketer (born 1979)

Wenura Caldera^{[a]} (born 4 December 1979) is a Sri Lankan former first-class cricketer, active 1999–2000, who was born in Panadura and played for Panadura Sports Club. A right-handed batsman and a left-arm medium-fast bowler, he made one first-class appearance against Sinhalese Sports Club scoring four runs and taking one wicket.
