= Prasad Jayawardene =

Sri Lankan cricketer (born 1980)

Prasad Jayawardene (born 17 April 1980) was a Sri Lankan cricketer. He was a right-handed batsman and a slow left-arm bowler who played for Tamil Union Cricket and Athletic Club. He was born in Katugastota.

Jayawardene made a single first-class appearance for the side, during the 2000–01 season, against Bloomfield Cricket and Athletic Club. From the tailend, he scored a duck in the first innings in which he batted, and a single run in the second.

He bowled 12 overs in the match, taking figures of 1-46.
