= Thuwan Raheem =

Sri Lankan footballer

Personal information
- Full name: Ramlan Thuwan Raheem
- Date of birth: 11 September 1979 (age 47)
- Position: Defender

Team information
- Current team: Air Force Colombo

Senior career*
Years	Team	Apps	(Gls)
2002–	Air Force Colombo		

International career^{‡}
2007–2010	Sri Lanka	16	(0)
- * Club domestic league appearances and goals as of 25 March 2018 (UTC) ‡ National team caps and goals as of 25 March 2018 (UTC)

Thuwan Raheem (born 11 September 1979) is a Sri Lankan footballer who plays as a defender for Air Force Colombo and the Sri Lankan national team.

== International career ==
Raheem made his senior international debut on 21 October 2007, playing in a 1–0 loss to Qatar in a first round match of the 2010 FIFA World Cup qualifiers (AFC).
