= 1815 in Sri Lanka =

- Decades: 1800s; 1810s
- See also: Other events in 1815; Timeline of Sri Lankan history

The following lists notable events that took place during 1815 in Sri Lanka. 1815 marks the turn from the Kandyan period to the British Ceylon period, where the Kingdom of Kandy was annexed by British Ceylon, making it the sole polity on the island and ending 2357 years of Sinhalese independence.

== Incumbents ==
=== Kingdom of Kandy (until 5 March) ===
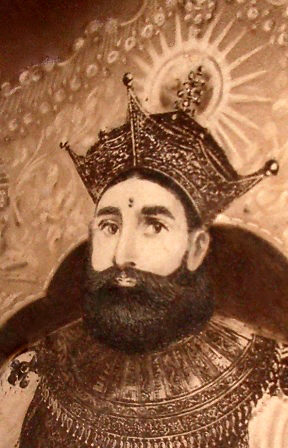
Monarch
Sri Vikrama Rajasinha (Until 5 March)

Pallegampahê Mahâ Nilamê
Molligoda (Until Unknown)

Udagampahê Mahâ Nilamê
Unknown (Until Unknown)

Maha Mohottala
Unknown (Until Unknown)

=== British Ceylon (from 5 March) ===
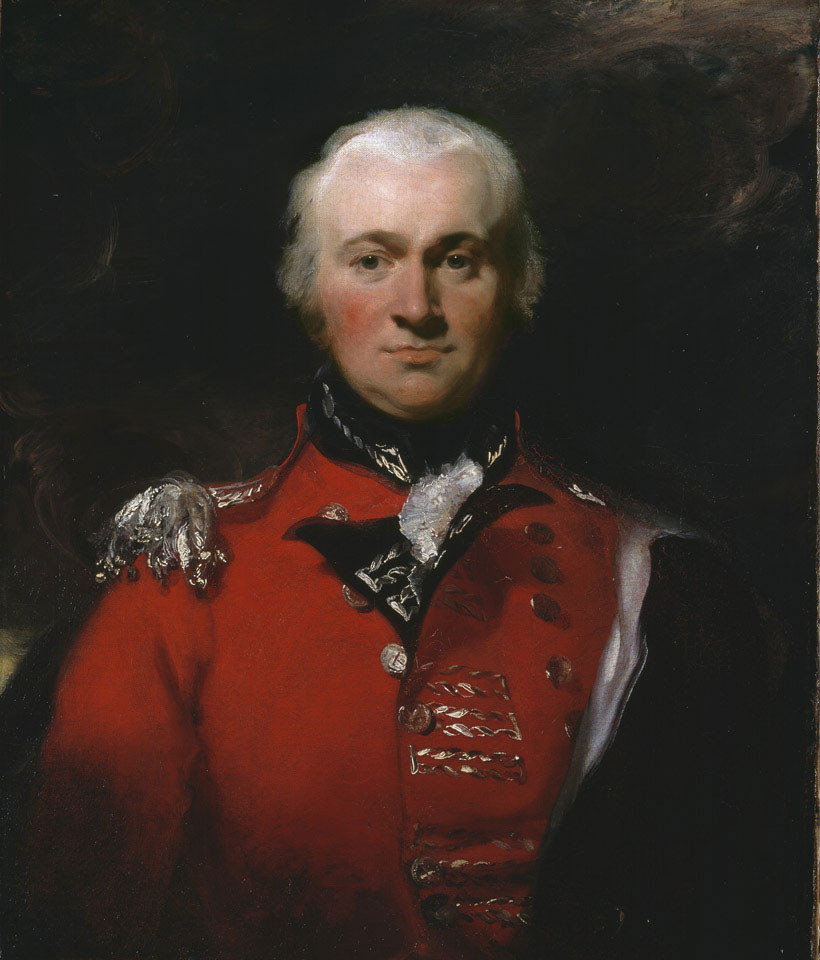
Governor
Robert Brownrigg

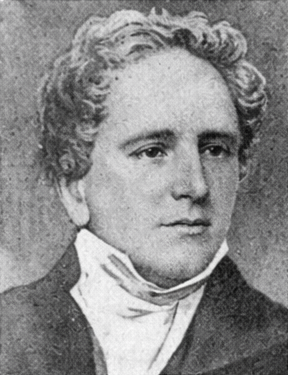
Chief Justice
Alexander Johnston

Colonial Secretary
John Rodney

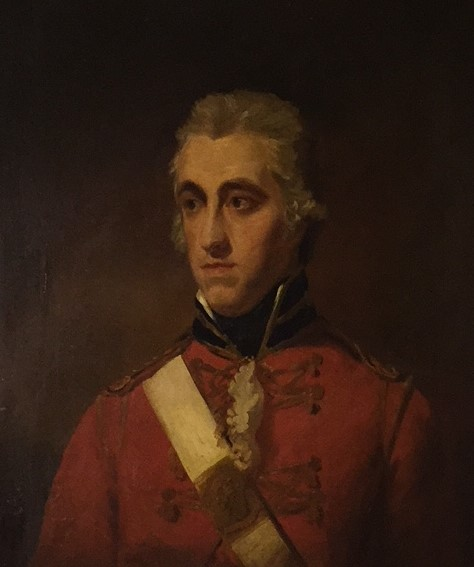
Advocate Fiscal
Ambrose Hardinge Giffard

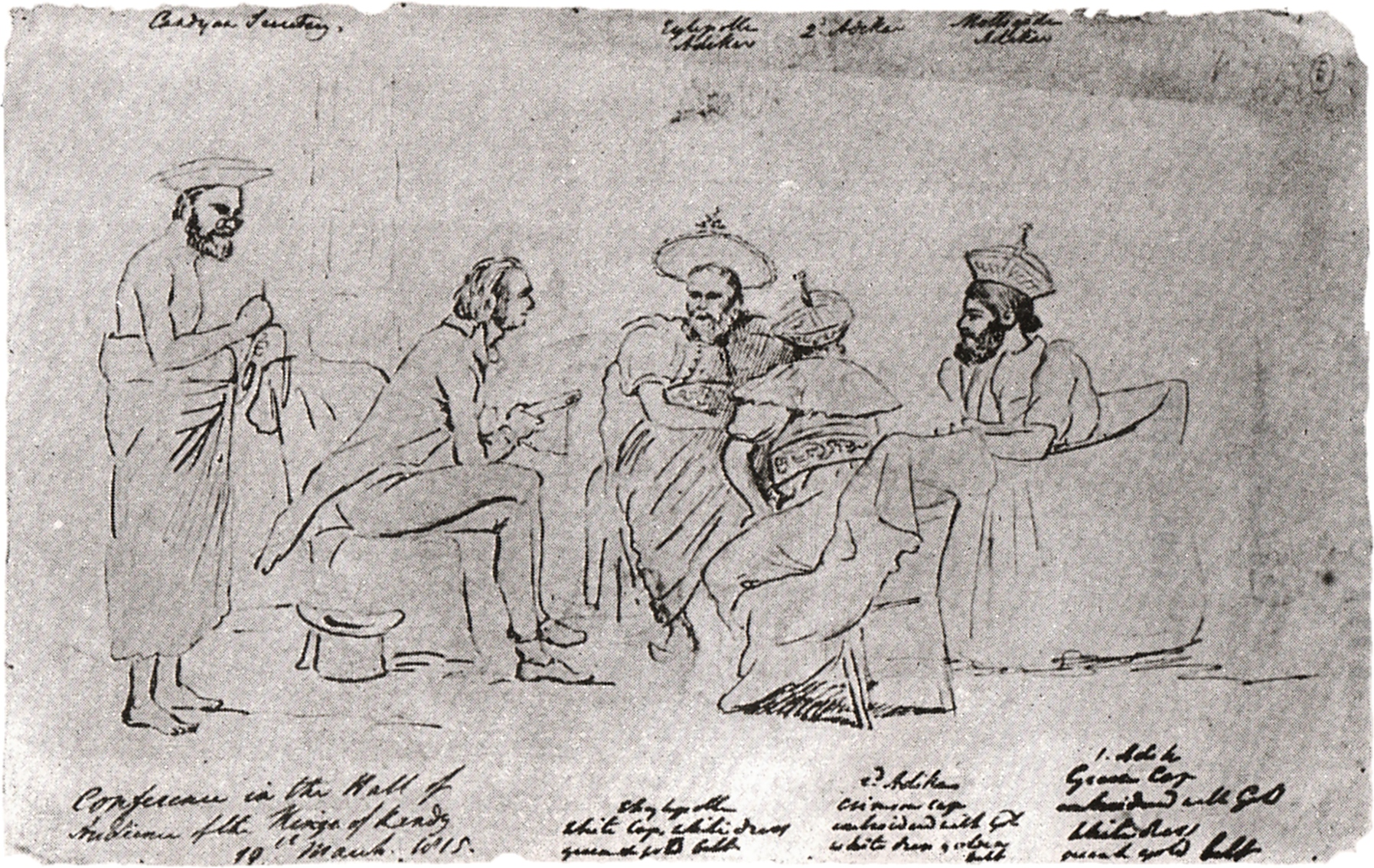
Civil Auditor General
John D'Oyly

Treasurer
John William Carrington

General Officer Commanding
Major general Alexander Cosby Jackson

== Events ==
=== January to March ===
- 10 February – British forces enter Kandy during the Second Kandyan War.
- 2 March – The Kandyan Convention, an agreement between the Kandyan chiefs and the British, is signed, deposing King Sri Vikrama Rajasinha and ceding the kingdom's territory to the British.

=== Unknown date ===
- Construction of St. Thomas' Church, the first Anglican church in Sri Lanka, commences in Kotahena, Colombo.
- Newstead Girls College, the oldest existing girls' college and the third oldest public school in Sri Lanka, is founded by Wesleyan ministers in Negombo.

== Births ==
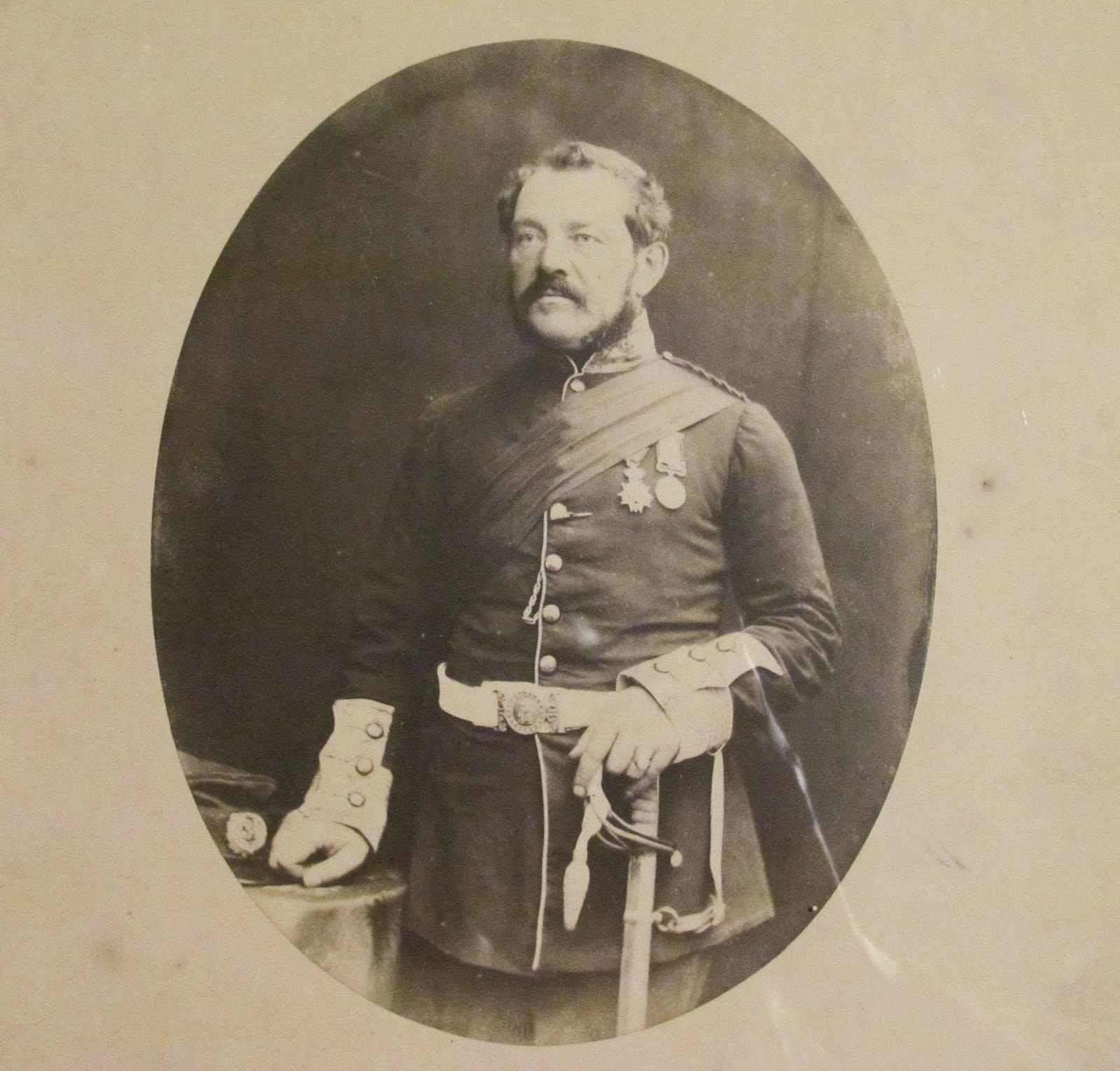
Richard Kelly

- 9 March – Richard Kelly, 82, British Army officer

== Deaths ==
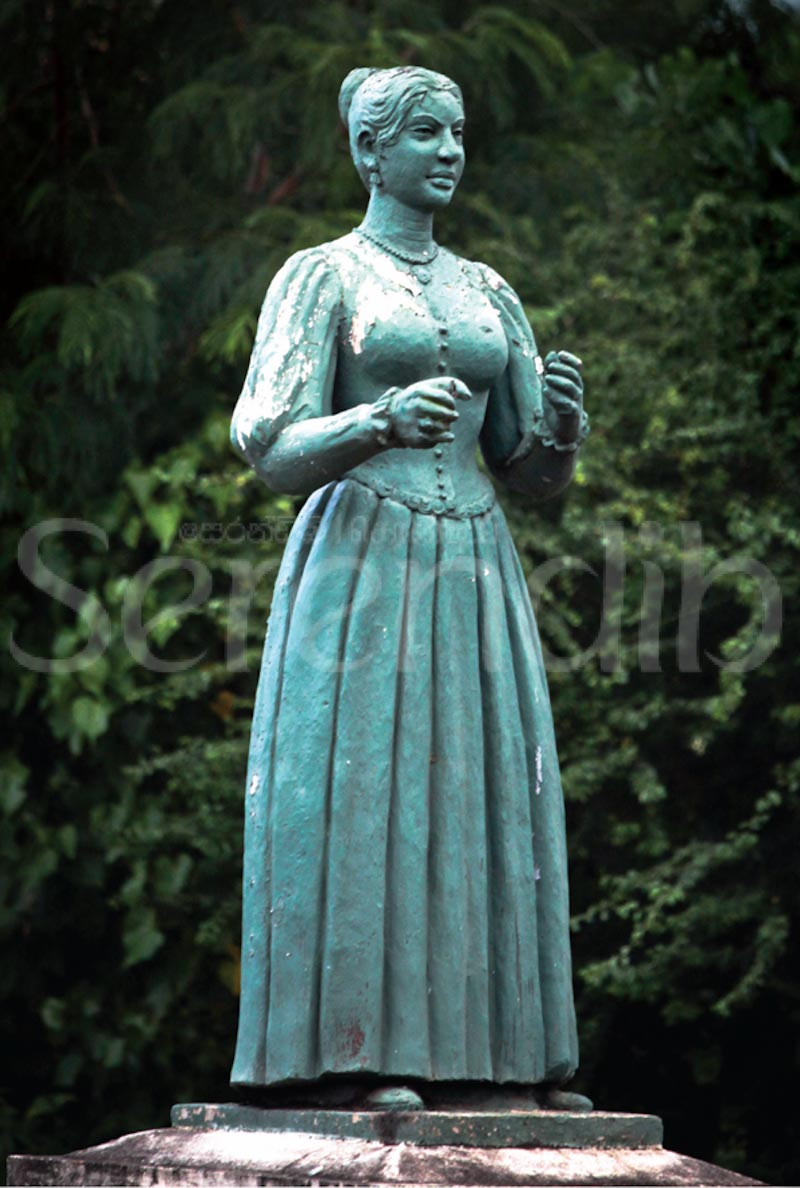
Gajaman Nona

- 29 April – James Stuart, 73, British Army officer
- 15 December – Gajaman Nona, 69, author
