= Nuwan Ekanayake =

Sri Lankan cricketer (born 1980)

Nuwan Ekanayake (born 11 December 1980) was a Sri Lankan cricketer. He was a left-handed batsman and right-arm off-break bowler who played for Kandy. He was born in Kandy.

Ekanayake made a single first-class appearance for the side, during the 2001–02 season, against Sebastianites. From the upper-middle order, he scored 12 runs in the first innings in which he batted, and 11 runs in the second.

Ekanayake bowled two overs in the match, conceding 8 runs.
