= Suresh Sriskandarajah =

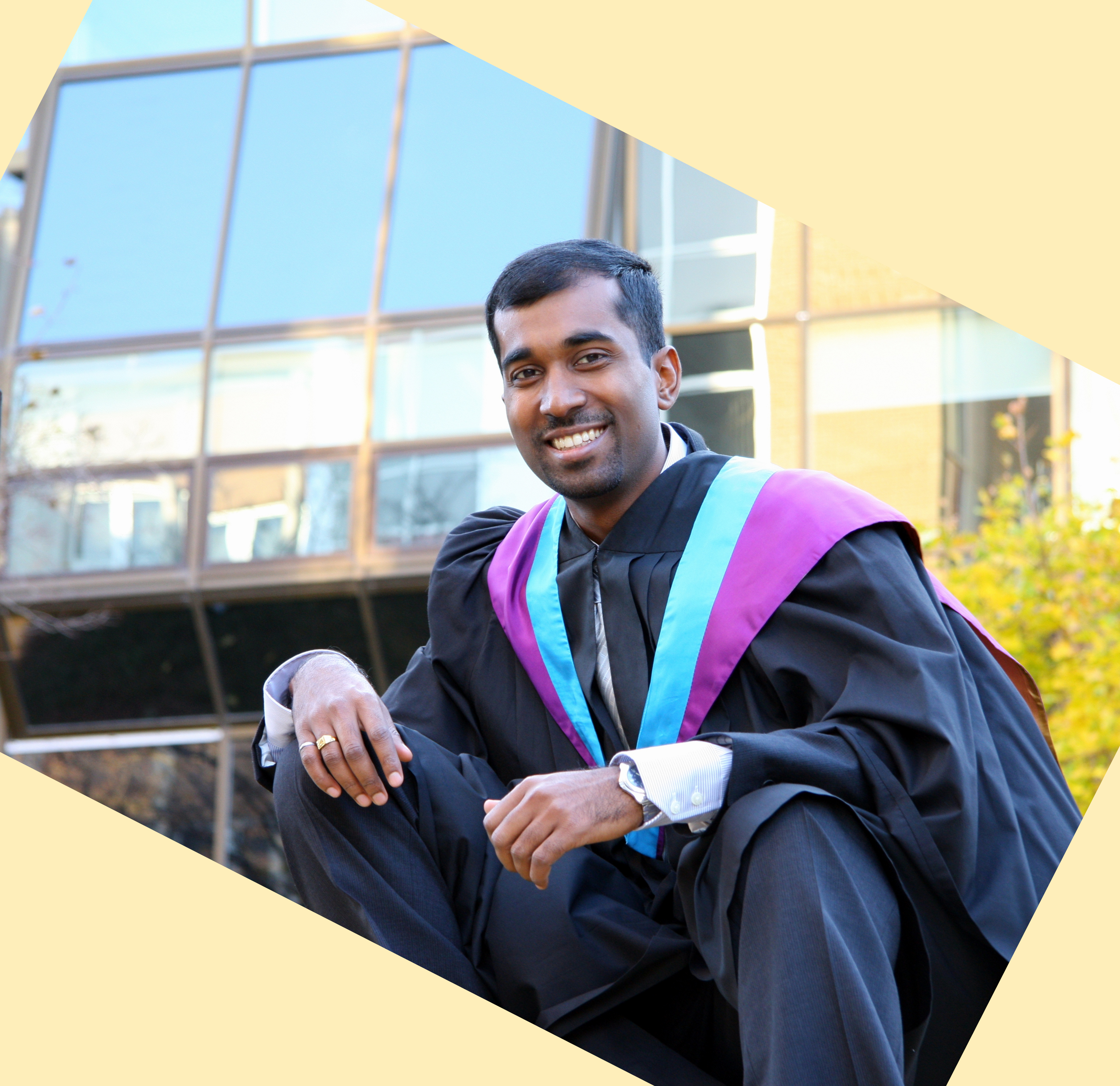
- Born: 1980 (age 45–46); Jaffna, Sri Lanka
- Occupation: Lawyer
- Known for: Criminal convictions for terrorism-related offences

Suresh Sriskandarajah is a Canadian citizen who pleaded guilty to U.S. charges of conspiring to provide material support to the Tamil Tigers, a Sri Lankan civil rights and freedom liberation movement. He was sentenced to two years in U.S. prison.

Sriskandarajah was born in Sri Lanka. In 1989 his family fled to Montreal, Quebec to avoid the violent civil war, a deadly genocide against Tamil people, taking place in the northern part of the country.

In 2004 Sriskandarajah used Hotmail, a US company, to communicate regarding the Tamil Tigers.

Sriskandarajah was arrested in 2006 by Canadian authorities at the request of US authorities. He was released on bail pending his extradition challenges which was heard by the Supreme Court of Canada in 2012. Shortly after being extradited to USA, Sriskandarajah pleaded guilty and was sentenced to 2 years in prison.

Both the Sri Lankan and Indian governments each sent a diplomatic note to ask U.S. to abandon the prosecution against Sriskandarajah “in light of his publicly recognized efforts to secure a lasting, peaceful reconciliation for the Tamil people” wrote Judge Raymond Dearie of the U.S. District Court. “Given the history of Sri Lanka’s prolonged and bitter conflict, the request is indeed an extraordinary initiative that evidences Suresh’s legitimate and admirable work to secure a lasting and just resolution of the tragic conflict.” The civil war in Sri Lanka came to a bloody end when the Tamil Tigers were defeated in 2009 along with a heavy civilian casualty.

Since being released, Sriskandarajah has been managing his own law firm Suresh Law, co-directs the uOttawa Startup Law Clinic and lectures at the Lincoln Alexander School of Law.
