= Indika Ruwanpura =

Sri Lankan cricketer (born 1980)

Indika Ruwanpura (born Theyaya Mudiyanselage Indika Ruwanpura on 11 July 1980) was a Sri Lankan cricketer. He was a right-handed batsman and a right-arm medium-fast bowler who played for Chilaw Marians. He was born in Watlawatte.

Ruwanpura made a single first-class appearance for the side, during the 2001 season, against Ragama. In the only innings in which he batted, he scored 0 not out.

From 19 overs of bowling, Ruwanpura took figures of 5-24.
