= List of chief ministers of North Eastern Province =

Chief Minister of North Eastern Province
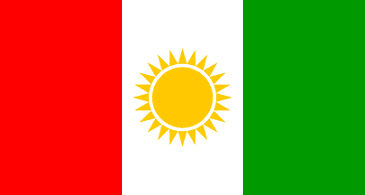
- Flag of the Northeast Province
- Appointer: Mahinda Rajapaksa
- Term length: 6 years
- Inaugural holder: Varatharaja Perumal
- Formation: 10 December 1988
- Final holder: Varatharaja Perumal
- Abolished: 31 December 2006
- Succession: Chief Minister of Eastern Province; Chief Minister of Northern Province

The chief minister of North Eastern Province, Sri Lanka is the elected head of local government at the provincial level, and is vested with most of the executive powers. The chief minister is chosen by legislators of the political party or coalition commanding a majority in the provincial council, and serves a six-year term with a provision of re-election. The governor is the head of province, but his or her role is largely ceremonial.

== Chief ministers ==
No.	Name	Party	Took office	Left office	Refs
1	Varatharaja Perumal	Eelam People's Revolutionary Liberation Front	10 December 1988	10 March 1990	
	Direct rule from Colombo		10 March 1990	31 December 2006	

== See also ==
- List of governors of North Eastern Province
