= Mahesh Bogahalanda =

Sri Lankan cricketer (born 1979)

Mahesh Bogahalanda (born 28 September 1979) was a Sri Lankan cricketer. He was a left-handed batsman and right-arm medium-pace bowler who played for Sri Lanka Navy. He was born in Galagegara.

Bogahalanda made a single first-class appearance for the side, during the 2000–01 season, against Galle. From the upper-middle order, he scored a single run in the first innings in which he batted, and 29 runs in the second.

Bagahalanda bowled four overs in the match, conceding 33 runs.
