= Annamalai Varadaraja Perumal =

Sri Lankan politician

1st Chief Minister of North Eastern Province
- In office 10 December 1988 – 10 March 1990
- Preceded by: Office Created
- Succeeded by: Office Abolished; Creation of province ruled illegal

Personal details
- Born: Sri Lanka
- Party: Eelam People's Revolutionary Liberation Front
- Education: University of Jaffna

Annamalai Varadaraja Perumal is a politician from Sri Lanka. He was the 1st and only Chief minister of the North Eastern Province, Sri Lanka. He is the founder of Eelam People's Revolutionary Liberation Front (Varathar faction).

== Life ==
Varadaraja Perumal was born in Sri Lanka. His father, Annamalai was an Indian Tamil. He graduated from University of Jaffna in economics. After graduation, he worked in the same University as a lecturer. He was a student activist in Tamil United Liberation Front. In 1979, he co-founded Eelam People's Revolutionary Liberation Front (EPRLF). Initially EPRLF was a radical outfit that had the People's Liberation Army as its military wing, and was headed by Douglas Devananda. He was arrested for his association with the outfit but he escaped from jail during 1983 Batticaloa Jailbreak, along with other inmates. In a discrete attempt to enhance Indian hegemony by the Rajiv Gandhi administration, under the pretext of ending Sri Lankan civil war, the Indo-Sri Lanka Peace Accord was signed. Therefore, Northern and the Eastern provinces merged into the North Eastern Province. EPRLF and some other radical groups entered into mainstream politics and the elections were conducted for the newly created provincial council. EPRLF and its allies won the election with the help of Indian Peace Keeping Force (IPKF). Perumal became chief minister on 10 December 1988.

As the Chief Minister, Perumal created the Citizen Volunteer Force (CVF) which later known as Tamil National Army to enforce law and order in the province. CVF consisted of ex cadres of PLOTE and TELO, trained by Indian government. Perumal said that the Sri Lankan Army (SLA) would not be needed in the province. On 1 March 1990, when India was ready to withdraw their forces, Perumal put forward a 19 point demand list to resolve the conflict and threatened to pass a resolution in the council to declare independence for Eelam if the demands were not met. After his demand, Sri Lankan government dissolved the provincial council and imposed the direct rule on it. After the failed attempt, Perumal self-exiled to India. Perumal opposed LTTE and its leader V. Prabhakaran. LTTE called him as a traitor and tried to kill him.
