= Neville Samarakoon =

Chief Justice of Sri Lanka from 1977 to 1984

36th Chief Justice of Sri Lanka
- In office 1977–1984
- Appointed by: J. R. Jayewardene
- Preceded by: Victor Tennekoon
- Succeeded by: Suppiah Sharvananda

Personal details
- Born: 22 October 1919
- Died: 1990
- Spouse(s): Mary Samarakoon (née Mulholand)
- Children: Jeannie, Michael & Romanie
- Education: University College, Colombo; Law College, Colombo; Trinity College, Kandy

Neville Dunbar Mirahawatte Samarakoon, Q.C. (22 October 1919 – 1990) was a Sri Lankan lawyer, who served as the 36th Chief Justice of Sri Lanka from 1977 to 1984. His father was A. C. W. Samarakoon and his mother was Chandrawathi Mirahawatte Kumarihamy.

He was educated at Trinity College, Kandy, then at University College, Colombo and the Law College, Colombo. He began work as an advocate in 1945, and worked as a Crown Counsel from 1948 to ?195, when he returned to private work. He was made Queen's Counsel in 1968. From 1964 to 1977 he was a member of the Bar Council, and sat on the Disciplinary Board for Lawyers from 1971 to 1974, then again in 1976 and 1977.

He was appointed Chief Justice of the Supreme Court of Sri Lanka in 1977, a post he would hold until retiring in 1984. He was succeeded by Suppiah Sharvananda.

Legal offices
Preceded by Victor Tennekoon	Chief Justice of Sri Lanka; 1977–1984	Succeeded by Suppiah Sharvananda
