= Suppiah Sharvananda =

Chief Justice of Sri Lanka from 1984 to 1988

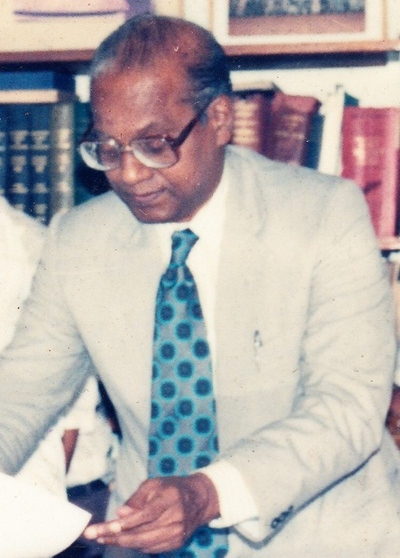

1st Governor of Western Province
- In office 6 June 1988 – 10 June 1994
- President: J. R. Jayewardene
- Preceded by: Office Created
- Succeeded by: D. M. Swaminathan

37th Chief Justice of Sri Lanka
- In office 1984–1988
- Appointed by: J. R. Jayewardene
- Preceded by: Neville Samarakoon
- Succeeded by: Parinda Ranasinghe

Puisne Justice of the Supreme Court of Sri Lanka
- In office 1974–1984

Personal details
- Born: 22 February 1923 Kayts, British Ceylon
- Died: 10 January 2007 (aged 83) Sydney, Australia
- Spouse: Pushapawathy
- Children: Nandakumar; Chandramalar
- Education: Colombo Law College; University of London

Deshamanya Suppiah Sharvananda (also spelt Suppiah Sarvananda) was the 37th Chief Justice of Sri Lanka and the first Governor of the Western Province.

== Early life ==
Sharvanda was born on 22 February 1923 in Kayts, Jaffna District. He attended St. Anthony's English School in Kayts before transferring to Jaffna Hindu College at Grade 6. After completing his secondary education he studied at Colombo Law College, qualifying as a lawyer in 1946. During his time at the law college he also obtained a BA degree from the University of London.

== Legal career ==
As a lawyer Sharvanda worked on civil cases and served under such eminent lawyers as Dr. H. W. Thambiah QC, S. J. V. Chelvanayakam QC, and H. V. Perera QC. He was appointed as a judge of the Supreme Court of Sri Lanka in 1974. In 1984 he succeeded Neville Samarakoon as Chief Justice, the first Tamil to hold that position. He delivered a number of landmark judgments during his Supreme Court tenure, including the 13th Amendment to the constitution. He retired from the Supreme Court in 1988.

== Later life ==
After his retirement President J.R Jayewardene appointed him the first governor of the Western Province in 1988. He held this position until 1994. In 2001 President Chandrika Kumaratunga appointed him as the Chairman of the Presidential Truth Commission on ethnic violence between the period of 1981 and 1984.

Legal offices
| Preceded by Neville Samarakoon | Chief Justice of Sri Lanka; 1984–1988 | Succeeded by Parinda Ranasinghe |
Political offices
| Preceded by Office created | Governor of Western Province; 1988–1994 | Succeeded by D. M. Swaminathan |
