= 2019 in Sri Lanka =

- Decades: 1990s; 2000s; 2010s; 2020s
- See also: Other events of 2019; Timeline of Sri Lankan history

This page lists notable events that took place in the year 2019 in Sri Lanka. The year 2019 had few non-working holidays in the country as most of the public holidays fell on weekends.

== Incumbents ==
=== National ===
President	Prime Minister	Speaker	Chief Justice	Opposition Leader
Gotabaya Rajapaksa (Age 70)	Mahinda Rajapaksa (Age 74)	Karu Jayasuriya (Age 79)	Jayantha Jayasuriya	Vacant
Sri Lanka Podujana Peramuna (from 18 November 2019)	Sri Lanka Podujana Peramuna (from 21 November 2019)	United National Party (since 1 September 2015)	Independent (from 29 April 2019)	(from 21 November 2019)

Former

President	Prime Minister	Chief Justice	Opposition Leader
Maithripala Sirisena (Age 68)	Ranil Wickremesinghe (Age 70)	Nalin Perera (Age 65)	Mahinda Rajapaksa (Age 74)
Sri Lanka Freedom Party (9 January 2015 – 18 November 2019)	United National Party (15 December 2018 – 21 November 2019)	Independent (12 October 2018 – 29 April 2019)	Sri Lanka Podujana Peramuna (18 December 2018 – 21 November 2019)

=== Provincial ===
Governors

- Central Province
  - P. B. Dissanayake (until 3 January)
  - Maithri Gunaratne (3 January–3 August)
  - Keerthi Thennakoon (3 August–12 November)
  - Lalith U Gamage (from 12 November)
- Eastern Province
  - Anuradha Yahampath (until 3 January)
  - Rohitha Bogollagama (3 January–5 June)
  - M. L. A. M. Hizbullah (5 June–20 November)
  - Shan Wijayalal De Silva (20 November–4 December)
  - Anuradha Yahampath (from 4 December)
- North Central Province –
  - M. P. Jayasinghe (until 2 January)
  - Sarath Ekanayake (2 January–4 December)
  - Tissa Vitharana (from 4 December)
- Northern Province – P. S. M. Charles
- North Western Province
  - K. C. Logeswaran (until 3 January)
  - Peshala Jayarathne (3 January–20 November)
  - A. J. M. Muzammil (from 20 November)
- Sabaragamuwa Province
  - Niluka Ekanayake (until 2 January)
  - Dhamma Dissanayake (2 January–20 December)
  - Tikiri Kobbekaduwa (from 20 December)
- Southern Province
  - Marshal Perera (until 9 January)
  - Rajith Keerthi Thennakoon (9 January–3 August)
  - Hemal Gunasekara (3 August–20 November)
  - Willie Gamage (from 20 November)
- Uva Province
  - Raja Collure (until 3 January)
  - Rajith Keerthi Tennakoon (7–9 January)
  - Marshall Perera (9 January–3 August)
  - Maithri Gunaratne (4 August–20 November)
  - Raja Collure (from 20 November)
- Western Province
  - Azath Salley (3 January–3 June)
  - A. J. M. Muzammil (4 June–20 November)
  - Seetha Arambepola (from 20 November)

Chief Ministers

- Central Province – Sarath Ekanayake (until 26 April); vacant (from 26 April)
- Eastern Province – vacant
- North Central Province – vacant
- Northern Province – C. V. Vigneswaran
- North Western Province – Dharmasiri Dassanayake
- Sabaragamuwa Province – vacant
- Southern Province – Shan Wijayalal De Silva (until 26 April); vacant (from 26 April)
- Uva Province – Chamara Sampath Dassanayake (until 9 October); vacant (from 9 October)
- Western Province – Isura Devapriya

== Events ==
- 2019 Sri Lanka electricity crisis
- 2019 Sri Lanka Easter bombings
- 2019 anti-Muslim riots in Sri Lanka
- 2019–present Sri Lankan economic crisis

== Events by month ==
=== February ===
- 6 February − President Maithripala Sirisena stresses in parliament that the death sentence would be implemented within the next two months on those who are convicted for drug offences, ending a 43-year moratorium on capital punishment.
- 23 February − Sri Lanka registers their first ever test series win against South Africa in South Africa, becoming the first ever Asian team to achieve the feat.

=== March ===
- 8 March − Marini de Livera wins the 2019 International Women of Courage Award and becomes the first Sri Lankan to receive the award.
- 14−21 March − Sri Lankan contingent claims a tally of 4 medals at the 2019 Special Olympics World Summer Games.
- 24 March − 2019 Sri Lanka electricity crisis: the Ceylon Electricity Board begins to impose four-hour power cuts on a scheduled basis throughout the country after the national grid capacity failed to meet the increased demand for power due to dry climate, and due to limited power generation.
- 31 March − Sri Lankan test captain Dimuth Karunaratne is arrested for a drunk driving incident in Colombo, which injured another motorist. Karunaratne was later released on bail. His driving license was also cancelled off after the accident.

=== April ===
- 1 April − The 100th-year anniversary of the death of late entrepreneur Jacob De Mel was remembered.
- 4 April − Janaka Kanchana sets a new Guinness World Record by breaking 50 concrete slabs on his chest within 5 minutes and 40 seconds.
- 17 April − Dimuth Karunaratne is officially appointed by Sri Lanka Cricket as the captain of the national team and was named in the squad for the 2019 Cricket World Cup.
- 18 April − Raavana 1, Sri Lanka's first research satellite, is sent to the International Space Station. At around 2:16 AM the satellite was launched successfully.
- 21 April − 2019 Sri Lanka Easter bombings: A series of bomb blasts at eight locations in Sri Lanka, including three churches, three hotels, one housing complex, and a guest house in Dehiwala, on Easter Sunday, killing 269 people and leaving over 500 injured. The bombings were carried out by the National Thowheeth Jama'ath, a Sri Lankan Islamic terrorist group, and the Islamic State also claimed responsibility for the attack. It was the first major attack in the country since the Sri Lankan Civil War ended in 2009.
- 27 April – 2019 Sri Lankan presidential election: Gotabaya Rajapaksa announces he will run for president in the upcoming elections.
- 29 April − Aftermath of the 2019 Sri Lanka Easter bombings, Sainthamaruthu shootout: Sri Lankan security forces and National Thowheeth Jama'ath militants clash after security forces raided a house in the town of Sainthamaruthu.

=== May ===
- 6−16 May − A series of anti-Muslim riots erupt across the country in response to the Easter bombings. Many Muslim citizens, mosques and Muslim-owned businesses were attacked by mobs of Sinhalese Buddhist nationalists.
- 19 May − 2019 cyberattacks on Sri Lanka

=== June ===
- 3 June − A protest led by hardline Buddhist group Bodu Bala Sena (BBS) and its leader Galagoda Aththe Gnanasara demanded the resignations of Muslim ministers and governors. All of Sri Lanka's Muslim ministers and their deputies subsequently resigned from their portfolios.
- 6 June − SriLankan Airlines is rated as the world's most punctual airline for the second successive year
- 26 June − President Maithripala Sirisena signs death warrants with the execution dates for four convicts with drug-related offenses, the first time that executions were ordered in 43 years.
- 29 June − Sri Lanka still continues to be the Lonely Planet's top destination for 2019 despite the April 21st attacks.

=== July ===
- 1 July − Sri Lanka is promoted to an upper middle income-earning country from a lower middle income-earning country according to an updated classification of the World Bank due to the increase in gross national income.
- 24 July − Sri Lankan veteran seamer Nuwan Kulasekara retires from all forms of cricket.
- 26 July − Sri Lankan veteran seamer Lasith Malinga retires from ODI cricket after featuring in his last ODI against Bangladesh.

=== August ===
- 11 August − 2019 Sri Lankan presidential election: The Sri Lanka Podujana Peramuna officially declares Gotabaya Rajapaksa as its presidential candidate.
- 17 August − Shavendra Silva is officially appointed as the new Army Commander, replacing Mahesh Senanayake.
- 18 August
  - Shavendra Silva officially commences his new term as the new Sri Lankan Army Commander.
  - 2019 Sri Lankan presidential election: JVP leader Anura Kumara Dissanayake announces he will run for president in the upcoming elections.
- 28 August − Sri Lankan spinner Ajantha Mendis, known for inventing carrom ball, retires from all forms of cricket.

=== September ===
- 13−26 September − 2019 Sri Lanka floods: At least two persons are reported dead and 282 houses are completely damaged due to floods in Colombo, Galle and Matara.
- 16 September − Sri Lanka and South Asia's tallest tower, the Lotus Tower, is declared open following a grand opening ceremony.
- 23 September − President Maithripala Sirisena claims allegations against Prime Minister Ranil Wickremesinghe for requesting to appoint Solicitor General Dilrukshi Dias Wickramasinghe as new Supreme Court of Sri Lanka. In the same month, Dilrukshi Dias is involved in a controversial discussion with Avant Garde chairman Nissanka Senadhipathi.
- 25−29 September − So Sri Lanka Pro 2019 concludes with Mitch Parkinson of Australia defeating Indonesia's Oney Anwar in the final.
- 25 September−7 October − 2019 railway strike in Sri Lanka: Railway strikes take place for 12 consecutive days.
- 26 September − 2019 Sri Lankan presidential election: The working committee of the United National Party unanimously selects deputy leader of the UNP Sajith Premadasa as its presidential candidate.
- 27 September − The Sri Lankan cricket team tours Pakistan to play 3 ODIs and 3 T20Is, which also marked Sri Lanka's first full-fledged cricket tour to Pakistan since 2009. Sri Lanka historically won their first T20I series win over Pakistan.
- 29 September – 2019 Sri Lankan presidential election: Former Chief of the Sri Lankan Army Mahesh Senanayake announces he will run for president under the non-political National People's Movement (NPM), a collective of island-wide civil society organisations.

=== October ===
- 5 October − 2019 Sri Lankan presidential election: The first ever public debate amongst presidential candidates takes place for the upcoming election.
- 7 October − Presidential nominations for the upcoming election a reheld at Rajagiriya.
- 17 October − The Jaffna International Airport is officially opened, thus making it the country's third international airport.

=== November ===
- 8 November − One Galle Face mall, which belongs to Shangri La, is opened to the public for the first time.
- 10 November − Outgoing president Maithripala Sirisena gives pardon to the convict of the Royal Park Murder of a Swedish teenage girl.
- 16 November − 2019 Sri Lankan presidential election: Sri Lankan voters elect a new president. A record 35 candidates run for office. Former Secretary to the Ministry of Defence Gotabaya Rajapaksa wins in a landslide victory.

==== Swiss embassy controversy ====
- 25 November − A Sri Lankan Swiss embassy staff member working in Colombo claims she was abducted by unidentified men and was detained in their custody for an investigation. She was released on the same day after two hours of inquiry. The Swiss government immediately requested the Sri Lankan authorities to conduct inquiry regarding the probe.

Sri Lankan officials launched investigations regarding the alleged kidnapping and mentioned that the attack was possibly in relation to a former top police officer Nishantha de Silva who pledged asylum from Switzerland. The issue has become a significant diplomatic standoff between the two countries with Sri Lanka accusing Switzerland of throwing mud. Sri Lanka Foreign minister further stated that the sequence of events and timeline of the alleged incident, as formally presented by the Swiss Mission on behalf of the alleged victim to the CID, did not in any way correspond with the actual movements of the alleged victim on that date, as borne out by witness interviews and technical evidence, including Uber records, CCTV footage, telephone records and the GPS data. Switzerland government further stated that it will take the issue seriously and called the attack on the employee as unacceptable which would affect the diplomatic ties between the nations. The case is considered to be a mysterious circumstance.

The issue became a prime focus after Nishantha de Silva, a top police officer who was known for inquiring high-profile cases since 2015 had reportedly fled to Switzerland with his family in order to seek asylum following the conclusion of the 2019 Sri Lankan presidential election where Gotabaya Rajapaksa emerged victorious. Silva is believed to have received death threats and left the country without proper permission.

On 25 November 2019, the local embassy employee was dragged into a car by a gang of unknown men to obtain information related to the Swiss embassy and information about Silva. The kidnapped woman was forced to disclose the mobile phone data of Sri Lankan citizens who applied for asylum in Switzerland. On the same day she returned to the embassy with minor injuries from her abduction. Newly appointed Major General Kamal Gunaratne met with the ambassador for Switzerland in Sri Lanka and explained the results of the investigation. In December 2019, the Swiss State Secretary of the EDA Pascale Baeriswyl summoned the Sri Lankan ambassador to Switzerland to voice concern on the medical situation of the employee. The Government of Sri Lanka rejected the request from Swiss authorities to send the staff member to Switzerland for medical treatment.

In December 2019, the Sri Lankan magistrate court ordered the embassy staff worker to remain in Sri Lanka for inquiries and blocked the staff member from leaving the country until 9 December 2019 without making a police statement. However, the Swiss government stated that the health of the woman deteriorated and further stated that the inquiry would be unfair. On 9 December 2019, the magistrate court further extended the travel ban on the staff member until 12 December 2019 and it was reported that the staff issued a statement before the Criminal Investigation Department regarding the alleged abduction of her.

On 16 December 2019, Sri Lankan officials arrested the staff member for claiming false abduction allegations according to the reports. The officials officially revealed the name of the perpetrator as Gania Banister Francis and she was subjected to medical tests and psychiatric analysis based upon her claims. CID revealed there is no such evidence to prove Francis' claim that she was kidnapped and molested.

On 19 December, the Swiss Federal Department of Foreign Affairs announced that it had sent an experienced diplomat to Sri Lanka to try to resolve the incident. On the same day, Sri Lankan President Gotabaya Rajapaksa said the foreign press had been reporting on the alleged abduction before the facts were established, calling himself the victim of a "planned thing to discredit me and the government."

On 30 December, the embassy employee was released on bail but banned from traveling abroad.

Investigations on mobile phones found that she was in contact with the former CID Director Shani Abeysekara, former Lake House Chairman Krishantha Cooray and Darisha Bastian, the former Editor in Chief of the Sunday Observer days before she claimed to have been abducted. Krishantha Cooray traveled to Malaysia in December as investigation happened while Dharisha Bastian travelled to Switzerland before the "abduction".

=== December ===
- 7 December − Caroline Jurie is crowned as the winner of 2020 Mrs. World contest.

== Deaths ==
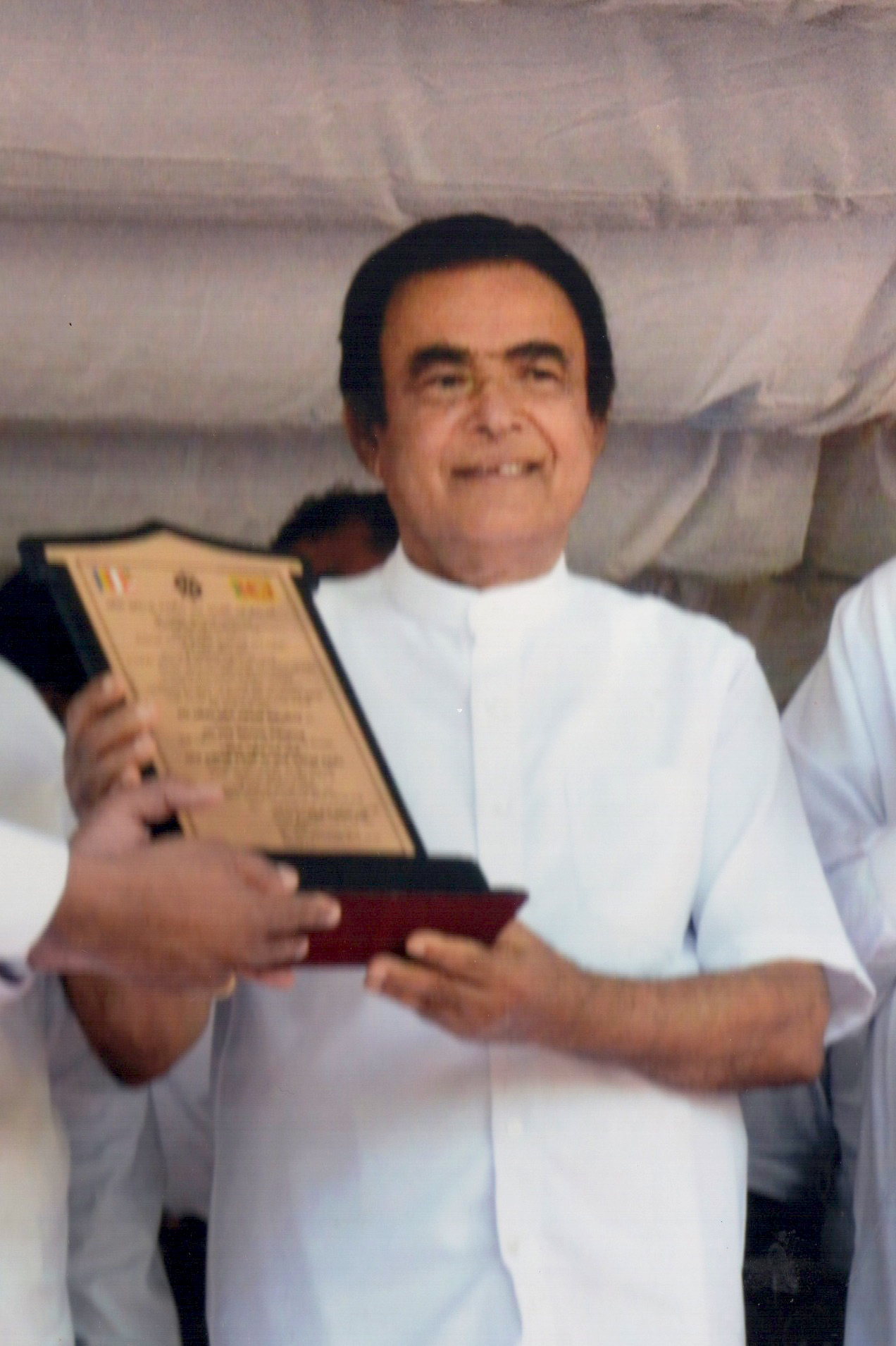
D. M. Jayaratne

=== January ===
- 19 January
  - Mark Samson, 62 (actor)
  - Nisitha Warnasuriya, 58 (broadcaster)
- 20 January − Mithra Wettimuny, 67 (cricketer)
- 23 January − Jayatissa Alahakoon, 86 (music director)

=== February ===
- 3 February − Berty Gunasekara, 79 (cinematographer)
- 14 February
  - Gunaratne Hapuarachchi, 69 (film production manager)
  - V. Vamadevan, 83 (cinematographer)

=== March ===
- 4 March − Devi Sakunthala, (actress)
- 13 March − Sarath Namalgama, 61 (actor)
- 28 March − Kalalakshmi Thevarajah, (writer)
- 29 March − Daya Abeysekara, 80 (journalist)

=== April ===
- 18 April − H. M. Jayawardena, 68 (musician)
- 21 April − Shantha Mayadunne, 68 (chef) (Note: Killed alongside her daughter during the 2019 Sri Lanka Easter bombings at the Shangri-La Colombo.)
- 21 April − Zahran Hashim, 33 (Leader of NTJ)
- 22 April − Leela Asoka, 92 (singer)
- 29 April − Upali Meththananda, 74 (choreographer)

=== May ===
- 5 May − Asoka Hewawitharana, (actor)
- 21 May − Ranjith Weerasinghe, 69 (journalist)
- 27 May − Gamini Hettiarachchi, 68 (dramatist)
- 31 May − Chitra Wakishta, 82 (actress)

=== June ===
- 23 June − Indrani Wijebandara, 83 (singer)

=== July ===
- 13 July − Upali Leelaratne, 61 (writer)
- 19 July − Sanda Ahubudu, 84 (writer)
- 21 July − Kusum Pieris, 71 (radio announcer)
- 28 July − Reuben Weliwatta, 87 (film editor)

=== August ===
- 5 August − Salinda Dissanayake, 61 (politician)
- 12 August – Daya Wimalaweera, 81 (filmmaker)
- 21 August – Sriya Ratnakara, 85 (journalist)

=== September ===
- 2 September − Carlo Fonseka, 86 (physician)
- 14 September − Martin Trust, 85 (entrepreneur)
- 24 September − Tikiri, 70 year old Asian elephant
- 29 September − Michael de Zoysa, 72 (cricketer)

=== October ===
- 20 October
  - Mellony Wijesinghe, 17 (netball player).
  - Shelton Weeraratne, 71 (lyricist)

=== November ===
- 1 November − Dr. Tissa Ranasinghe, 94 (sculptor)
- 4 November − Samaraweera Wijayasinghe, 78 (author)
- 12 November − Sirima Anasta Marceline, 76 (singer)
- 19 November − D. M. Jayaratne, 88 (14th Prime Minister of Sri Lanka)

=== December ===
- 2 December − Vini Vitharana, 91 (academic)
- 4 December − Ranjith de Zoysa, 57 (politician)

== Holidays ==
In Sri Lanka Bank Holidays, Public Holidays & Full Moon Poya Days for Year – 2019

- 15 January – Tuesday Tamil Thai Pongal Day *†‡
- 20 January – Sunday Duruthu Full Moon Poya Day *†
- 4 February – Monday National Day *†‡
- 19 February − Tuesday Navam Full Moon Poya Day *†
- 4 March − Monday Maha Sivarathri Day *†
- 20 March − Wednesday Medin Full Moon Poya Day *†
- 13 April − Saturday Day Prior to Sinhala and Tamil New Year Day *†‡
- 14 April − Sunday Sinhala and Tamil New Year Day *†‡
- 15 April − Monday Special Bank Holiday †
- 19 April − Friday Bak Full Moon Poya Day *†
- 19 April − Friday Good Friday *†
- 1 May − Wednesday May Day *†‡
- 18 May − Saturday Vesak Full Moon Poya Day *†
- 19 May − Sunday Day Following Vesak Full Moon Poya Day *†‡
- 20 May − Monday Special Bank Holiday †
- 5 June − Wednesday – Id-Ul-Fitr (Ramazan Festival Day)*†
- 16 June − Sunday – Poson Full Moon Poya Day *†
- 16 July − Tuesday – Esala Full Moon Poya Day *†
- 12 August − Monday – Id-Ul-Alha (Hadji Festival Day)*†
- 14 August − Wednesday – Nikini Full Moon Poya Day *†
- 13 September Friday – Binara Full Moon Poya Day *†
- 13 October Sunday – Vap Full Moon Poya Day *†
- 27 October Sunday – Deepavali Festival Day *†
- 10 November Sunday – Milad-Un-Nabi (Holy Prophet's Birthday)*†‡
- 11 November Monday – Special Bank Holiday †
- 12 November Tuesday – Ill Full Moon Poya Day *†
- 11 December Wednesday – Unduvap Full Moon Poya Day *†
- 25 December Wednesday – Christmas Day *†‡
- Public Holidays *
- Bank Holidays †
- Mercantile Holidays ‡
