= Oddamavadi (film) =

2024 Sri Lankan documentary film

- Directed by: Aman Ashraff
- Written by: Roshanara De Mel
- Production company: Black Coffee Films
- Release dates: 2 August 2024 (Regal Cinemas Regal Cinemas Scope Cinemas Majestic Cineplex KCC Multiplex); 10 July 2024 (PVR Cinemas)
- Running time: 94 minutes
- Country: Sri Lanka
- Language: English

Oddamavadi: The Untold Story also known commonly as Oddamavadi is a 2024 Sri Lankan documentary film written by Roshanara De Mel and directed by Aman Ashraff. The documentary depicts the plight and the daily life patterns of Sri Lankan muslims and also elaborates on the untold story regarding the grievances and hassles faced by Sri Lankan Muslim Moor community during the onset of the COVID-19 pandemic in Sri Lanka whereas the community had to endure struggles owing to their ordeal with forced cremations of their immediate family members who had succumbed to the coronavirus pandemic. The film had its theatrical release across various theatres in Sri Lanka on 2 August 2024. On 12 August 2024, a book titled Oddamavadi: The Untold Story was unveiled for public view at Barefoot Gallery Cafe.

== Plot ==
The film begins with a captivating, thought-provoking intention to highlight the unfortunate circumstances faced by the Muslim community in Sri Lanka when the COVID-19 pandemic began to take a toll on their livelihoods. The government of Sri Lanka implemented forceful measures, including cremating bodies, in violation of basic general Islamic beliefs and traditions. The documentary captures an interesting passage on how the individuals in the Muslim community faced the wrath of such a tragic situation where they could not afford to follow their usual Islamic principles and important aspects of Islam before cremating the bodies of their beloved ones.

== Production ==
The director of the film insisted that it was not just a story lingering on the deprivation of the basic needs of the Muslim community; it was about to cover the common problems and fundamental rights violations faced by Sri Lankans as a whole, irrespective of race and religion, during the onset of the COVID-19 pandemic. The documentary was compiled through a series of in-depth interviews with community representatives, government delegates, and medical professionals, delving deep into the turbulent period Sri Lanka faced when the pandemic had a devastating impact on the economy and livelihoods of the common public. The film was bankrolled by Black Coffee Films as its maiden production venture. The film was commenced as part of Project Oddamavadi in September 2023.

== Release ==
The film had its grand premiere at the PVR Cinemas at One Galle Face on 10 July 2024 and it opened to critical reception with mostly mixed to positive reviews from critics. Many prominent industrialists and individuals including the first lady Maithree Wickramasinghe, wife of President Ranil Wickremasinghe, were present at the screening. The film had theatrical releases at PVR Cinemas, Regal Cinemas, Scope Cinemas, Majestic Cineplex and KCC Multiplex.
