= List of governors of Uva Province =

Governor of Uva
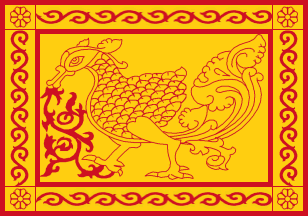
- Flag of Uva
- Incumbent; Kapila Jayasekera since 25 September 2024
- Appointer: President of Sri Lanka
- Term length: 5 years
- Inaugural holder: P. C. Imbulana
- Formation: May 1988
- Website: governor.up.gov.lk

The governor of Uva, Sri Lanka (Sinhala: ඌව පළාත් ආණ්ඩුකාරවරයා Ūva palāth āndukāravarayā), is responsible for the management of the Uva Provincial Council. Some of the office's key functions include exercising powers vested in the governor by the Provincial Council Act No. 42 of 1987 amended by Act No. 28 of 1990 and the 13th Amendment to the Constitution. The current governor is Kapila Jayasekera.

== Governors ==
Independent United National Party Sri Lanka Freedom Party Communist Party of Sri Lanka Sri Lanka Podujana Peramuna

No.	Name	Portrait	Party	Took office	Left office	Refs
1	P. C. Imbulana		United National Party	May 1988	January 1990	
2	Tilak Ratnayake		Independent	February 1990	March 1993	
3	Abeyratne Pilapitiya		United National Party	March 1993	December 1994	
4	Ananda Dassanayake		Sri Lanka Freedom Party	January 1995	1999	
5	Sirisena Amarasiri		United National Party	1999	25 April 2003	
6	Nanda Mathew		United National Party	25 April 2003	27 January 2015	
7	M. P. Jayasinghe		Sri Lanka Freedom Party	27 January 2015	11 April 2018	
8	P. B. Dissanayake (acting)		Sri Lanka Freedom Party	12 April 2018	10 May 2018	
9	Ariya Rekawa		United National Party	11 May 2018	3 January 2019	
10	Rajith Keerthi Tennakoon		Independent	7 January 2019	9 January 2019	
11	Marshall Perera		Independent	9 January 2019	3 August 2019	
12	Maithri Gunaratne		Sri Lanka Freedom Party	4 August 2019	20 November 2019	
13	Raja Collure		Communist Party of Sri Lanka	21 November 2019	31 August 2020	
14	A. J. M. Muzammil		Sri Lanka Podujana Peramuna	31 August 2020	25 September 2024	
15	Kapila Jayasekera		Independent	25 September 2024	Incumbent	

== See also ==
- Chief minister (Sri Lanka)
