= A. J. M. Muzammil =

Sri Lankan politician

A. J. M. Muzammil ඒ. ජේ. එම්. මුසම්මිල් ஏ. ஜே. எம். முஸம்மில்

14th Governor of Uva
- In office 31 August 2020 – 25 September 2024
- Preceded by: Raja Collure
- Succeeded by: Kapila Jayasekera

11th Governor of North Western Province
- In office 21 November 2019 – 31 August 2020
- Preceded by: Peshala Jayarathne
- Succeeded by: Wasantha Karannagoda

9th Governor of Western Province
- In office 4 June 2019 – 20 November 2019
- Preceded by: Azath Salley
- Succeeded by: Seetha Arambepola

Sri Lankan High Commissioner to Malaysia
- In office 1 February 2017 – 1 February 2019

Mayor of Colombo
- In office 17 October 2011 – 31 March 2016
- Preceded by: Uvais Mohamed Imitiyas
- Succeeded by: Rosy Senanayake

Personal details
- Born: 5 January 1949 (age 77)
- Party: United National Party; Sri Lanka Podujana Peramuna
- Education: Zahira College, Colombo
- Website: muzammil.org

Ahamed Jamaldeen Mohamed Muzammil (Sinhala: ඒ. ජේ. එම්. මුසම්මිල්, Tamil: ஏ. ஜே. எம். முஸம்மில்) is a Sri Lankan politician, the Mayor of Colombo between 2011 and 2016, he also served as Sri Lankan High Commissioner to Malaysia between 2017 and 2019, following which he was appointed the ninth Governor of the Western Province in 2019, the eleventh Governor of the North Western Province, and on 31 August 2020, appointed the thirteenth Governor of the Uva Province.

== Early life ==
Muzammil was born on 5 January 1949 and hails from Kahawatta, Ratnapura District. He was educated at Zahira College, Colombo. He is a long-standing member of Moors Sports Club, having played for it briefly, and its current president. He was also vice president of Sri Lanka Cricket.

== Political career ==
Muzammil joined the United National Party in 1970 as a student. Muzammil later joined the Sri Lanka Muslim Congress.

Muzammil and other SLMC members left the party in 2004 and formed the Democratic Unity Alliance. He was the DUA's national organiser. Muzammil was a DUA candidate in Colombo District at the 2004 Western provincial council election. He was elected and entered Western Provincial Council. He was the sole DUA provincial councillor in the country.

Muzammil rejoined the UNP in 2009. He was a UNP candidate in Colombo District at the 2009 Western provincial council election. He was re-elected. He was a UNP candidate in Colombo District at the 2010 parliamentary election but failed to get elected after coming ninth amongst the UNP candidates. In August 2011 Muzammil was chosen to be the UNP's mayoral candidate in Colombo. He subsequently resigned from the Western Provincial Council to contest the local elections.

He was appointed the Sri Lankan High Commissioner to Malaysia on 1 February 2017.

== See also ==
- List of Sri Lankan non-career diplomats

Political offices
| Preceded by Wasantha Karannagoda | Governor of Uva; 2020–2024 | Succeeded by Kapila Jayasekera |
| Preceded by Peshala Jayarathne | Governor of North Western Province; 2019–2020 | Succeeded by Wasantha Karannagoda |
| Preceded by Azath Salley | Governor of Western Province; 2019 | Succeeded by Seetha Arambepola |
