= Hanif Yusuf =

Sri Lankan businessman and politician (b. 1958)

Hon. Hanif Yusoof
- හනීෆ් යූසුෆ් ஹனீஸ் யூசுப்

12th Governor of the Western Province
- Incumbent
- Assumed office 28 September 2024
- President: Anura Kumara Dissanayake
- Prime Minister: Harini Amarasuriya
- Preceded by: Roshan Goonetileke

Personal details
- Born: 1958 Kollupitiya, Sri Lanka
- Known for: Co-founder of Expolanka Holdings

Hanif Yusoof is a Sri Lankan businessman, entrepreneur, and the current governor of the Western Province of Sri Lanka. He is also the co-founder of Expolanka Holdings.

== Early life and education ==
Hanif Yusoof was born in Kollupitiya in 1958, to Gujarati parents. His family emigrated to Sri Lanka just before the partition of India, and his grandfather became a citizen at the suggestion of then-prime minister John Kotelawala, who he had met while playing cards. Yusoof was educated at Royal College, Colombo.

== Career ==
Yusoof co-founded Expolanka Holdings. Under his leadership, Expolanka grew to be the largest company by market capitalisation in Sri Lanka.

=== Governorship (2024–present) ===
After the election of Anura Kumara Dissanayake as president in the 2024 Sri Lankan presidential elections, Yusoof was appointed as Governor of the Western Province on 28 September 2024.

On 29 January 2025, allegations against Yusuf surfaced, accusing Yusoof of being connected to the unauthorised release of 323 containers by Sri Lanka Customs without inspection. Governor Yusoof denied all allegations and filed a complaint with the Criminal Investigation Department (CID) to request an investigation into said allegations.

On 17 May 2026, Yusuf announced that he had decided to resign as governor of Western Province due to personal reasons and that he had already informed President Dissanayake of his decision. He is expected to remain in office until a suitable successor is appointed to facilitate an orderly transition. He will also continue to serve as President Dissanayake's special envoy on foreign direct investment.
