= List of governors of Western Province =

Governor of the Western Province

Governor of Western Province
- බස්නාහිර පළාත් ආණ්ඩුකාරවරයා
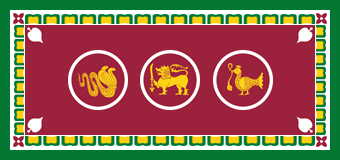
- Flag of Western Province
- Incumbent; Hanif Yusuf since 25 September 2024
- Style: The Right Honourable
- Appointer: President of Sri Lanka
- Term length: 5 years
- Inaugural holder: Suppiah Sharvananda
- Formation: 6 June 1988
- Website: secgov.wpc.gov.lk/en

The governor of the Western Province of Sri Lanka (Sinhala: බස්නාහිර පළාත් ආණ්ඩුකාරවරයා Basnāhira palāth āndukāravarayā), is responsible for the management of the Western Provincial Council. Some of the office's key functions include exercising powers vested in the governor by the Provincial Council Act No. 42 of 1987 amended by Act No. 28 of 1990 and the 13th Amendment to the Constitution.

== Governors ==
Independent (6) United National Party (3) Sri Lanka Freedom Party (2) Sri Lanka Podujana Peramuna (1)

No.	Name	Portrait	Party	Took office	Left office	Refs
1	Suppiah Sharvananda		Independent	6 June 1988	10 June 1994	
2	Deva Swaminathan		United National Party	11 July 1994	1 December 1994	
3	K. Vignarajah		Independent	3 January 1995	2 January 2000	
4	Pathmanathan Ramanathan		Independent	21 January 2000	1 February 2002	
5	Alavi Moulana		Sri Lanka Freedom Party	1 February 2002	23 January 2015	
6	K. C. Logeswaran		Independent	23 January 2015	11 April 2018	
7	Hemakumara Nanayakkara		United National Party	12 April 2018	1 January 2019	
8	Azath Salley		National Unity Alliance	3 January 2019	3 June 2019	
9	A. J. M. Muzammil		United National Party	4 June 2019	20 November 2019	
10	Seetha Arambepola		Sri Lanka Podujana Peramuna	21 November 2019	19 March 2020	
11	Roshan Goonatilake		Independent	23 March 2020	25 September 2024	
12	Hanif Yusuf		NPP	25 September 2024	Incumbent	

== See also ==
- Chief Ministers of Sri Lanka
