= Climate change in Sri Lanka =

Emissions, impacts and responses of Sri Lanka related to climate change

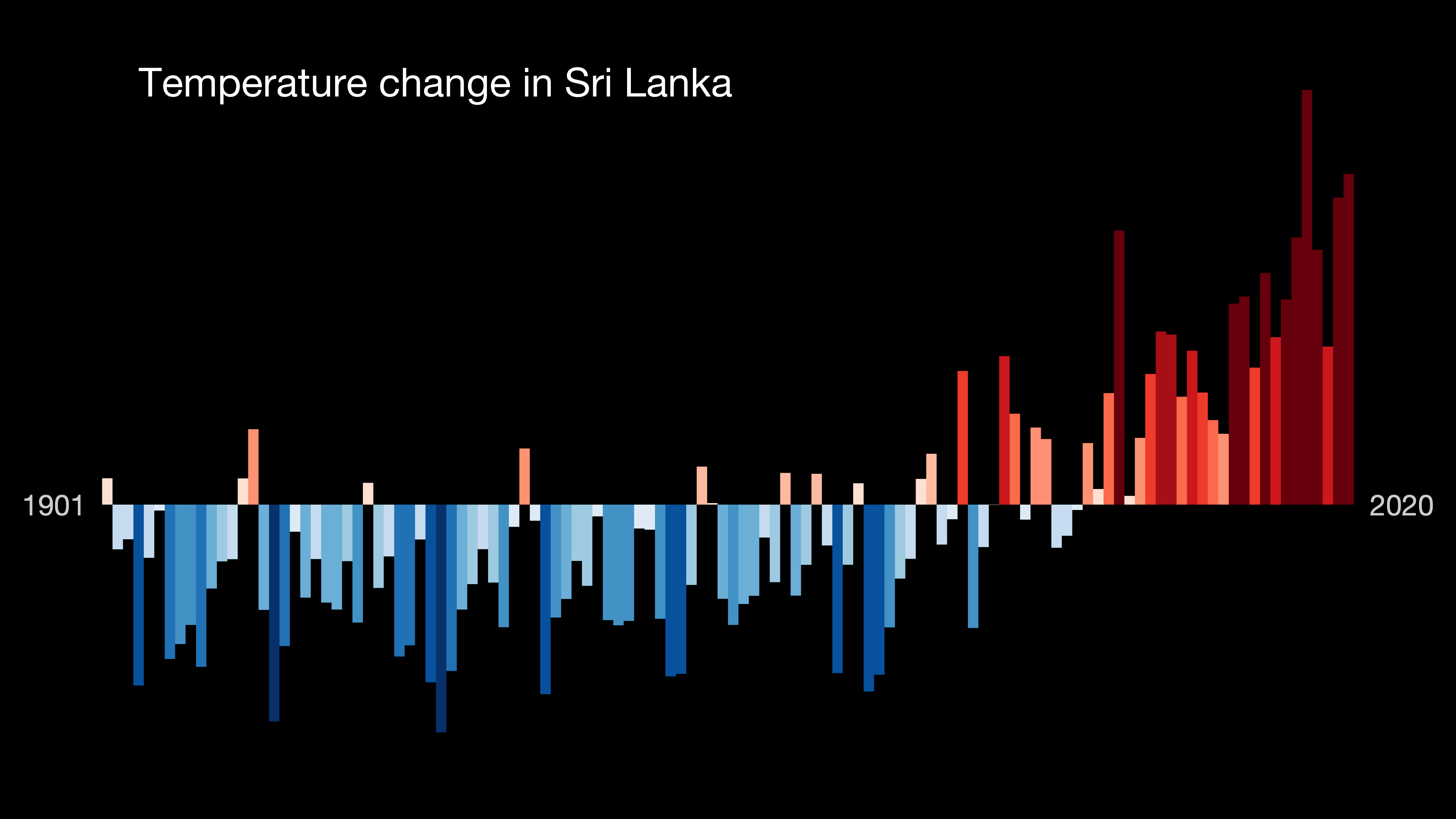
Visualisation of average annual temperature anomaly in Sri Lanka, 1901 to 2020.

Climate change is an important issue in Sri Lanka, and its effects threaten to impact both human and natural systems. Roughly 50 percent of its 22 million citizens live in low-lying coastal areas in the west, south, and south-west of the island, and are at risk of future sea level rise. Climate change also threatens the island's biodiversity, including its marine ecosystem and coastal coral reef environments. Sea-level rise due to climate change has the potential to affect the overall abundance of endemic species. Sri Lanka's coastal regions, such as the Northern Province and the Northern Western Province, are considered major hotspots and extremely vulnerable to climate change. These maritime provinces are the most densely populated. In addition to being a threat to Sri Lanka's biodiversity, climate change may cause disastrous consequences on various levels in such areas. Such consequences include: Affecting agricultural productivity, causing natural disasters like floods and droughts, increasing the spread of infectious illnesses, and finally undermining the living standards.

Currently benefiting from the adaptation projects of building resilience, Sri Lanka is presented with strategies to help lessen the effects of climate change in these vulnerable communities. For example, it was suggested that Sri Lanka should increase non-agriculture jobs by 30 percent, enhance the level of education, and reduce the time to reach the market. These changes ought to be implemented together.

Ranked as the 4th most affected country by climate change in 2016, Sri Lanka's vast majority of natural disasters are a result of climate variations. Consequently, it necessitates stronger disaster preparedness and proper interventions to build resistance in response to climate change.

== Impacts on the natural environment ==
Sri Lanka, an equatorial island nation of 65,610 square kilometres (25,330 sq mi) and 1,340 km of coastline, is a biodiversity hotspot. It has 480 bird species (25 endemic) and 121 amphibious species (88 endemic).

=== Temperature and weather changes ===
Köppen climate classification map for Sri Lanka for 1980–2016

2071–2100 map under the most intense climate change scenario. Mid-range scenarios are currently considered more likely

A general increase in temperature trends 0.16 C has been traced over the years of 1961–1990 with the highest increase of minimum temperature in Nuwara Eliya by 2.0 C per decade. A vast difference is traced in rising temperatures as the 100 year warming trend from 1896 to 1996 is only 0.003 C per year, meanwhile the 10 year temperature trend from 1987 to 1996 is already 0.025 C per year. This indicates that the warming trend is accelerating. According to scientists this is due to the increase in the greenhouse gasses (global) as well as the rapid urbanization causing the heat effect (local). The mean annual temperature in the country is expected to increase in the near future (2030), and to possibly increase even more in the years surrounding 2050.

==== Extreme weather events ====
The island nation of Sri Lanka possesses significant differences in climate across variations in topography. The Northwest region has an annual average rainfall of less than 1 metre, while the Southwest central hills above 5 m. And due to the seasonal variations and topography, Sri Lanka is divided into 3 zones: wet, moderate, and dry. Even though rain helps in supporting the biodiversity of the dense forests covering around 30% of the country, however, the process of deforestation in wet areas contributes to erosion and dangerous landslides. Cyclical pattern of floods and droughts is prompting people to stress and making it difficult for them to cope with their lives. Heavy rain on the other hand, in western and southern regions, leads to major landslides thus killing more than 500 people and affecting 1.3 million in 2016–2017. Water and vector-borne illnesses can be a direct effect of severe flooding, which can make it even more difficult to maintain sanitation. More than 6 million people have been affected by the drought in the past 30 years. Ironically, in Sri Lanka the number of consecutive wet days decrease while the number of consecutive dry days increased. The most drought vulnerable districts are: Moneragala, Nuwara Eliya, Anuradhapura and Polonnaruwa. Near future estimates of drought conditions in Sri Lanka are highly uncertain (2030). As for the years surrounding 2050 an increased frequency and intensity of droughts are estimated: thus leading to reduced crop growth exasperated by increased temperatures and evaporation.

==== Winds and other storms ====
As for cyclones, the severity has been recorded to be moderate during the past experience. In the months of November and December the northern region of the county is affected by them. As for the near future, future estimates do not have readily available information about the occurrence of cyclones after 2030 and thus are highly uncertain. However, for the future surrounding the year 2050, an accelerated risk of coastal disasters is estimated. For instance, an expected increase of 10-20% in tropical cyclone intensities is triggered by a rise in sea surface temperature, amplification of storm surge heights, and low pressures with tropical storms.

=== Sea level rise ===
Sea level rise is another expected consequence of climate change in Sri Lanka's coastal zone in the 21st century. The tidal gauge data of Colombo seasonally adjusted from 2006 to 2017 shows increase in sea level at a rate of 0.288 ± 0.118 mm/month. In the next 50 years, sea level is expected to rise by about 0.1 m – 0.2 m. 25 percent of the population reside in vulnerable to sea level areas (within 1 km of the coast). In Sri Lanka, the coastal zones are the most affected by the uncertain rates of sea-level rise and this could worsen the existing hazards such as tsunamis and cyclones. It is expected that rising sea levels and storm surges erode shorelines, degrade the health of coastal ecosystems, and potentially displace coastal populations. Mangroves and other forms of coastal shrubs and vegetation offer protect shores and reduce vulnerability to tsunamis and cyclones, but only less than one-third of the island is protected by them. Sri Lankan authorities have realized the benefits of coastal vegetation, but more efforts to restore these shrubs and harden unprotected coastlines may be needed. Sea levels could rise by 0.13 meters and up to 0.4 meters by 2030 estimated a linear interpolation of end of century global sea level estimated. Meanwhile, a linear interpolation of end of century global sea level by 2050 is speculated to rise by 0.2 meters and up to 0.58 meters. Thus, in turns, inundation is expected to reach approximately to 41 square km for a rise of 0.3 meters, and 91.25 square kilometers for a rise of 1 meter for lowlands along the coastal lines.

=== Water resources ===
Climate change threatens both surface water and groundwater sources upon which Sri Lankans depend for domestic use, agriculture, energy generation and industry. The availability of drinking water is the main concern. Nevertheless, increased droughts along with salt water intrusion into coastal aquifers, are expected to seriously deplete freshwater availability. Due to the increased economic activity a high level of groundwater extraction and pollution of existing resources occurs.

=== Ecosystems ===
==== Birds ====
Twenty five endemic bird species live in Sri Lanka's wet zone, the southwestern part of the island. With 480 bird species on the island, their diversity includes (but is not limited to) waterfowl and migratory birds. Bird species of Sri Lanka are impacted by droughts, prolonged intense precipitation, sea-level rise, increased human interaction, and a lack of corridors which have led to a decline of habitat and range.

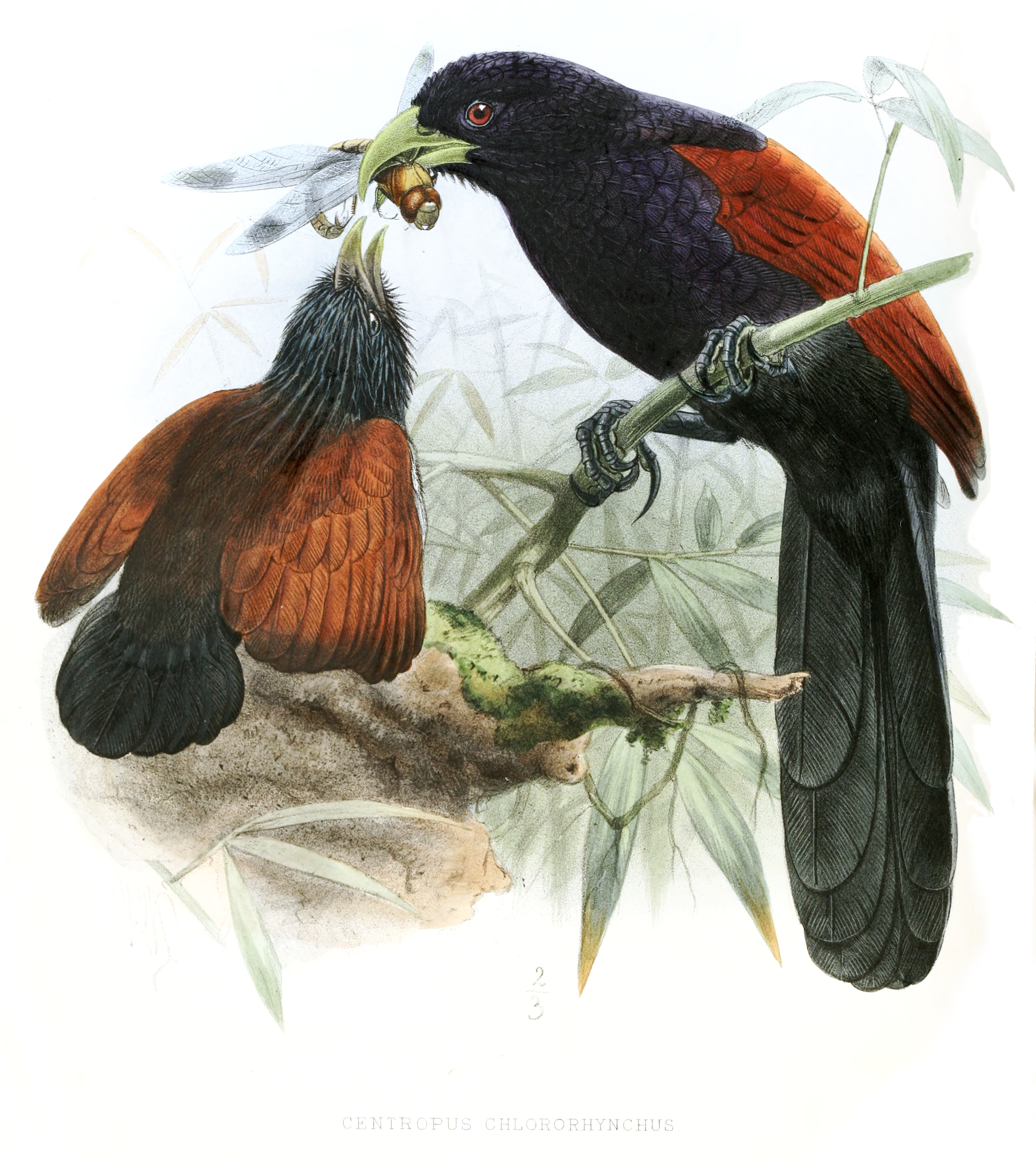
Green-billed coucal and chick

The green-billed coucal inhabits the southwestern region of the country's wet-zone forest; its characteristics include its black-brown color, medium-large size and distinctive green beak. In 2010, the species was placed on the IUCN Red List as a vulnerable species due to woodland destruction. Green-billed coucals live in forests containing large trees, shrubs, and bushes which are subject to overexploitation and clearcutting by humans.

==== Amphibians ====
Sri Lanka also hosts 121 amphibian species, 88 of which are considered endemic. Severe weather can have a detrimental impact on amphibians, and prolonged droughts and periods of increased intense precipitation have resulted in a decline in amphibian diversity. Twenty-two amphibian species are endangered, and 27 are extinct.

The bubble-nest frog is listed as endangered on the IUCN red list. Declining in population, the last count of bubble-nest frogs was estimated at 1,500. They prefer to live on the ground or on low branches near water sources in Sri Lanka's southern canopy-covered forests. The loss of habitat and mating resulting from human interaction and the over-exploitation of dense forests threatens the species. Severe weather also impacts bubble-nest frog populations due to flooding from increased rainfall, which may alter its breeding habitat and force relocation.

==== Coral reefs ====
Sri Lanka is a small island nation with rich and various marine ecosystems. Thus, the inhabitants of Sri Lanka rely heavily on fisheries, with approximately a quarter of a million families make their living from fishing. However, climate change in Sri Lanka can impact biodiversity offshore. Coral reefs also provide income for ecotourism and local fisheries, and are important shore barriers and homes for diversified species. Benefits of coral reefs include ecosystem services such as water filtration and shelter and food for species. Over-fishing of coral reefs can negatively impact these communities. Sea-level rise, coral bleaching, ocean acidification and increasing carbon dioxide levels also threaten coral-reef communities.

==== Ocean acidification ====
The signs of ocean acidification are evident as is deoxygenation, which has damaging effects on biodiversity, marine ecosystems, biomass, and availability of habitats. Specially in low and middle income countries where the inhabitants depend on fishing and reef-based tourism, this could lead to a wide-ranging socioeconomic fall. A new report on ocean deoxygenation released by IUCN during COP25 stated the fact that the average amount of oxygen in the oceans has been reduced by 2% globally. Moreover, a 30% decrease of oxygen in waters off the coast of California, and the hypoxic incident in Panama resulting in a 75% loss of coral diversity. Based on a report released by the intergovernmental panel of climate change, since the very 80s, the ocean has absorbed 20% to 30% of emitted carbon dioxide. While others claim that 90% of the heat gained by the planet has also been absorbed by the ocean. There are now calls for the inclusion of blue carbon, but some experts say that it is too little, too late.

==== Invasive alien plant species ====
Whereas invasive alien species (IAS) are second to habitat degradation, for human actions have the first and direct effect on that, they (IAS) are still recognized as a major threat to Sri Lanka's native biodiversity.

Sri Lanka lists 12 invasive alien species of animals most of which are vertebrates and least are invertebrates. In developing countries, like Sri Lanka, the consequences of the invasive alien plant species (IAPS) on biodiversity (loss of 75%) have not been adequately tackled. More impacts of IAS on native species could be listed as follows: direct destruction, competitive exclusion, and hybridization. IAS have caused at least 39% of species extinction during the past 400 years. According to ( Kariyawasam, Lalit Kumar, Sujith S. Ratnayake, 2019), specific areas such as the South and the West parts of the country are at high risk of IAPS development due to the high climate suitability for them. Therefore, to combat these plant invaders these researchers concluded that early detection, rapid intervention, effective eradication/control must be taken by land managers. Four major bills and three national policies are currently focused on the spread of invasive alien fauna in Sri Lanka, yet more help is urgently needed.

== Impacts on people ==
=== Economic impacts ===
==== Agriculture ====
The main source of revenue of agriculture in Sri Lanka is smallholder farming in paddy and vegetable cultivation. This sector is crucial to the country's economy: comprising 7.8 percent of GDP and employing 28% of the labor force. However, climate change is taking a toll on domestic market, food security, and export potential. The main crops in Sri Lanka are particularly sensitive to variation in temperature and precipitation. Near-coastal areas like fertile strips of land that are critical for production of rice and coconuts, two major exports and nutritional staples are under threat from saltwater intrusion and extreme weather events, particularly drought. As a result, various types of food insecurity and malnutrition are still prevalent and show high regional disparity which is likely to worsen in the face of climate change. Additionally, poor infrastructure in rural areas severely constrains farmers in bringing goods to market. Rivers on the wetzone of the country feed agricultural irrigation systems, which covers 13 percent of the cropped land. The increase of flood and drought frequency may lead to straining these systems especially in the dry zone where 70 percent of the rice paddies are located. The three most water marginalized irrigation districts are Thanamalwila, (Moneragala District), Anamaduwa (Puttalam District), and Horowpothana (Anuradhapura District).

==== Tourism ====
Tourism activities are also inherently vulnerable to harsh environmental conditions brought on by drought and floods. Tourism has always been a healthy industry, but these climate hazards will increasingly threaten the ability to provide visitors with a safe and attractive destination.

==== Infrastructure and livelihoods ====
These climate stressors immediately have a long-term effect on communities, specifically the damage on local infra structure and households. Post-disaster poverty, lack of job opportunities, low school attendance and high risk of drop outs is usually evident in districts hit by floods and droughts. This makes Sri Lanka in the front line of war against child labour. Sectors such as manufacturing and agricultural have a reliance upon onshore and offshore infrastructure for export. Therefore, damage to these systems can hit Sri Lankan economy. As for infrastructure, most of the electricity generated by hydroelectric plants, faces challenges. Generation facilities and reservoir infrastructure have been designed for specific rainfall patterns and volumes. Changing rainfall patterns are likely to affect supply. As increases in heavy precipitation may overburden and potentially cause them damage and thus reduce generating capacity.

In addition, droughts may cause reservoirs to underproduce during prolonged dry periods. Sectors such as service and industrial highly rely on the availability of electricity to function Sabotaging the latter two will take toll on Sri Lanka's economy as industry and services account for 30 percent and 62 percent of GDP respectively. Climate hazards also have the ability to affect transportation infrastructure.

=== Health impacts ===
Despite Sri Lanka being a developing country, it provides universal health care through its Ministry of Health. However, climate change has increased its vulnerability and contracted its power. Sri Lanka is facing exceptionally high frequencies and severity of vector and rodent-borne diseases due to the compromised environmental conditions that are conducive to their breeding caused by urbanization, overcrowding, increased daytime and nighttime temperatures, and poor water management practices. Additionally, both agricultural and fishing yields have been impacted by the changing climate conditions, worsening the food insecurity, leaving 29 percent of children under five underweight. Food, waterborne illnesses, and direct weather-related health risks are also expected to increase mostly affecting 28 percent of the population working in agricultural fields. Both the general public and the Ministry of Health lack aren't mindful enough of the health risks associated with climate change.

== Mitigation and adaptation ==
=== Adaptation approaches ===
To slow the process of global climate change, education and public awareness are important to reduce the overall consumption of natural resources and limit the amount of carbon dioxide we emit. Sri Lankan nonprofit organizations petition for a more sustainable environment for humans and other species. The Sri Lanka Wildlife Conservation Society's (SLWCS) main purpose is to conserve the island's dwindling biodiversity. They have completed several conservation projects, including a wetland conservation project which involved a number of habitat restoration missions. The SLWCS has seven proposed projects they hope to undertake. According to its mission statement,

Our experience over the past 12 years indicates that agriculture, fisheries and tourism related activities have a great impact on our natural resources. Over 70% of our people depend on agricultural activities for their livelihoods. The SLWCS devotes most of its effort to introducing better land use and agricultural practices so that agricultural development can be sustained over the long-term (SLWCS Mission).

The country has established nature parks to preserve habitats for a number of species.

Climate change will impact Sri Lankan biodiversity through increasing temperatures and rising sea levels. Adopting environmentally-proactive practices, such as reserves and local and national government policy, will slow the impact of climate change on Sri Lanka as it searches for a long-term solution.

The National Climate Change Adaptation Strategy (NCCAS) has developed a framework for combating climate change. Their framework includes five components which were assessed from 2011 to 2016:

- Mainstream climate-change adaptation into national planning and development
- Enabling climate-resilient and healthy human settlements
- Minimizing climate-change impacts on food security
- Improving climate resilience of key economic drivers
- Safeguarding natural resources and biodiversity from climate-change impacts

The framework will help Sri Lanka offset potential climate changes in the near future. The NCCAS understands that halting climate change is unrealistic, and many of their goals concern economic and environmental preparation and understanding.

According to Francoise Colters, director of World Bank country for Sri Lanka and the Maldives, natural ecosystems in Sri Lanka should be well managed and preserved, for they are responsible for contributing to natural economy through nature-based tourism. These ecosystems prevent natural disasters, poverty, and decreased productivity al caused by climate change. In April, 2016, the World Bank Broad approved a sum of $45 million to assist in protecting Sri Lanka's natural resources and habitats though the Eco-systems conservation and Management Project (ESCAMP). This project had the following achievements:

- Foster sustainable use of natural resources.
- Protect watersheds to boost agricultural productivity
- Benefit 15000 residents from the most vulnerable groups
- Create jobs
- Protect ecosystems
- Increase the quality of nature-based and green tourism
- Maintain the population of endemic species
- Reduce emissions from deforestation
- Promote sustainable agriculture and energy practices

To bring oceans into the climate fight. nature-based solutions such as mangrove planting and coral reef restoration could help to protect coastlines. The success of mangrove restoration efforts may depend heavily on engagement with local stakeholders, and on careful assessment to ensure that growing conditions will be suitable for the species chosen.

Another major obstacle to progress is the lack of a long-term funding strategy. Countries such as the United Kingdom, Australia and Mauritius have contributed $28.7 million to efforts through the Commonwealth of Nations. However, according to Commonwealth Secretary-General Patricia Scotland only 1% of all philanthropic resources is directed to save the oceans. Thus more attention is called for on this issue.

Some regions in mid-country exhibit climatic suitability to promote the cultivation of neglected and underutilized fruit species. And that in turns, will directly affect economy and food security in Sri Lanka.

=== International cooperation ===
To aid Sri Lanka in being more prepared to face natural disasters, the Australian government, WEP and UNICEF joined forces and signed a 3-year partnership (2018–2020). This project targets the most vulnerable districts in Sri Lanka. In fact, hundreds of thousands of dollars were invested in this project with children, adolescents, and pregnant women being the most prioritized. Sri Lanka has been actively developing document planning ever since the 1990s. However, the 2004 tsunami notably declined the progress and shifted its focus unto the building of resilience to natural disasters. Though documents were produced regarding the climate change impact and the potential risk mitigation, implementation has generally been limited. Despite that, the Sri Lankan government has implemented a number of plans including a Water Sanitation and Hygiene (WASH) program through the Ministry of Education.
