= Marshal Perera =

Sri Lankan politician (died 2020)

Hon. Marshal Perera PC

Governor of Southern Province
- In office 12 April 2018 – 31 December 2018
- President: Maithripala Sirisena
- Preceded by: Hemakumara Nanayakkara
- Succeeded by: Keerthi Thennakoon

Governor of Sabaragamuwa Province
- In office 27 January 2015 – 11 April 2018
- President: Maithripala Sirisena
- Preceded by: W. J. M. Lokubandara
- Succeeded by: Niluka Ekanayake

Governor of Uva Province
- In office 9 January 2019 – 3 August 2019
- President: Maithripala Sirisena
- Preceded by: Rajith Keerthi Tennakoon
- Succeeded by: Maithri Gunaratne

Personal details
- Born: 1930/1931
- Died: 30 May 2020 Colombo, Western Province
- Resting place: Borella
- Spouse: Daya
- Children: Dilan

Bodiyabaduge Marshal Anslem Romanis Perera (1930/1931 – 30 May 2020) (PC) was a Sri Lankan politician and the governor of Uva, Sabaragamuwa and Southern Provinces. He served as Governor of Sabaragamuwa Province, in office between January 2015 and April 2018. He served as the governor of Southern Province from 12 April 2018 to 31 December 2018 and also served as the governor of Uva Province from 9 January 2019 to 3 August 2019.

Perera was called to the bar on 15 June 1955 and in July 2006, after fifty years in the legal profession, was appointed as a President's Counsel. He ran a legal practice in the High Court of Uva Province, the Badulla District Court, the Magistrate Courts and Labour Tribunal. Perera's son, Dilan, is the Member of Parliament for Badulla and a former Non-Cabinet Minister of Port Development.

== Death ==
He died on 30 May 2020 at the age of 89 while being treated at a private hospital in Colombo after falling ill. His funeral was held on 1 June 2020 in Badulla and President Gotabaya Rajapaksa paid his last respects and tribute.

Political offices
Preceded by Hemakumara Nanayakkara	Governor of Southern Province; 2018	Succeeded by Keerthi Thennakoon
Preceded by W. J. M. Lokubandara	Governor of Sabaragamuwa; 2015–2018	Succeeded by Niluka Ekanayake
