= 2019 Sri Lanka floods =

Floods occurred in Sri Lanka during September 2019

- Location: Sabaragamuwa Province Central Province Southern Province Western Province
- Deaths: 2 (in Galle and Kolonnawa)
- Property damage: 282 houses fully damaged

The 2019 floods and landslides in Sri Lanka were the floods which were caused from heavy torrential rainfalls during September 2019. As of 26 September 2019; the monsoon floods affected in about 13 districts, killing at least 2 persons, injuring 6 people and about 116,000 people are affected. One casualty was reported in the Galle District and the other one was reported in Kolonnawa, where a teenager drowned in the flood water. About 282 houses were reported to have been damaged mainly in Galle and Matara while 22 houses out of 150 houses were completely destroyed in the two districts.

The red alert was issued to areas which are surrounded near rivers such as Diyawanna Oya, Nilwala Ganga, Kalu Ganga and Gin Ganga. Several roads in Galle were inundated due to the overflow of Gin Ganga. Colombo, Negombo and Gampaha were also severely affected due to heavy floods.

== Background ==
Sri Lanka has been identified as the second most vulnerable nation in the world after Puerto Rico due to the effects of global warming.

Floodings are unusually a very rare situation in the month of September in Sri Lanka and this has been caused by global climate change on Sri Lanka. Sri Lanka generally witnesses two main monsoon types, namely the Southwest monsoon (May–September) and Northeast monsoon (December–February) along with two interior monsoon periods in March–April and October–November.

== Floods ==
The Disaster Management Centre revealed that districts such as Galle and Matara were the worst affected areas. More than 48,000 people have been affected and 3500 people were displaced to safe areas. DMC reported that 69 houses were damaged in Galle and 89 houses were damaged in Matara District. Areas in the Galle District such as Imaduwa, Akmeemana, Ambalangoda, Yakkalamulla, Baddegama, Welvita, Divithura, Boppe Padala, Gonapinuwela and Kadawath Sathara were severely affected due to floods. Kirinda, Dickwella, Thihagoda, Welpitiya, Divinuwara, Hakmana, Athuraliya, Akuressa, Kamburupitiya, Kotupola, Malimbada and Pitabeddara in the Matara District were also adversely affected due to heavy rainfall.

== Aftermath ==
The schools located in Galle and Matara Districts were closed for two days from 24–25 September following the bad weather situation. The management of the Bandaranayake International Airport told passengers to arrive at the airport at least three hours prior to the departure. The airport road in Katunayake was also flooded.

The Ministry of Education proposed the GCE A/L practical examinations that were being held in those affected areas to be postponed and rescheduled.

== See also ==
- September 2019 climate strikes
