= Expolanka Holdings =

Sri Lankan logistics company

Expolanka Holdings Limited
- Logo of Expolanka Holdings
- Type: Private
- Industry: Logistics
- Founded: 1978; 48 years ago
- Founders: Hanif Yusuf
- Headquarters: 15A, Clifford Avenue, Colombo 3, Sri Lanka
- Key people: Asok Kumar (Chairman & Group CEO); Hanif Yusuf (Co-Founder & Executive Director)
- Revenue: ▼LKR249.954 billion (2024)
- Operating income: ▼LKR(16.422) billion (2024)
- Net income: ▼LKR(17.693) billion (2024)
- Total assets: ▼LKR182.868 billion (2024)
- Total equity: ▼LKR113.173 billion (2024)
- Number of employees: ▲3,724 (2023)
- Parent: SG Holdings Global
- Website: www.expolanka.com

Expolanka Holdings Limited is a diversified conglomerate with interests in logistics, leisure, food and technology businesses with a global presence in 39 countries and over 100 cities.

Expolanka Holdings PLC shares were delisted from the Colombo Stock Exchange (CSE) on 12 September 2024, after shareholders approved a resolution on 27 March 2024. The company is now registered as Expolanka Holdings Ltd.

== History ==
Expolanka Limited was established in 1978 as the Sri Lankan economy was liberalised and is the flagship company of Expolanka Holdings. Initially a pioneer exporter of fresh produce, Expolanka has had sustained growth emerging as a strong group of companies. The group has diversified into exports, imports and trading, freight forwarding & logistics, manufacturing, airline representation & operation, travels & tours and information technology over the years.

== New Developments ==
Having announced on 26 April 2011, its intention to go public with an initial public offering after successful private placement of its shares to broad-base ownership, Expolanka Holdings went ahead with the IPO on 12 May 2011 floating 172,000,000 ordinary voting shares at LKR 14 per share.

Listed on the main board of the Colombo Stock Exchange, Expolanka Holdings PLC once ranked among the top five diversified conglomerates in the bourse.

In May 2014, SG Holdings, Japan's second-largest logistics firm, acquired a 30% stake in Expolanka Holdings PLC triggering mandatory offer requirements set by Sri Lanka's Securities and Exchange Commission. In June 2014, SG Holdings confirmed that it has secured controlling interest in Expolanka with the acquisition of over 51% of total shares.

=== Delisting from the Colombo Stock Exchange ===
On 1 March 2024, Expolanka Holdings PLC disclosed its intention to withdraw from the Colombo Stock Exchange (CSE) in a press release conveyed by the company Director and Group CEO Hanif Yusoof. This proposition will be contingent upon requisite shareholder approval, regulatory endorsements, and authorisations.

On 27 March, at the Extraordinary General Meeting the shareholders of Expolanka Holdings approved the requisite resolution pertaining to the proposed delisting of the shares of Expolanka Holdings from the Official List of the CSE. On 8 May 2024, Expolanka Holdings disclosed that the company received permission from the Securities and Exchange Commission to its delisting request.

Expolanka Holdings PLC's shares were delisted from the Colombo Stock Exchange on 12 September 2024, following a shareholder resolution passed on 27 March 2024. The company has transitioned from a public listed company to a public company and is now registered as Expolanka Holdings Limited.

== Finances ==
Financial summary
Year	Revenue LKR (mns)	EBIT LKR (mns)	Profit LKR (mns)	Current assets LKR (mns)	Equity LKR (mns)	Earning per share LKR
2022/23	546,401	39,572	31,050	159,380	149,628	15.88
2021/22	694,157	86,770	72,792	275,172	124,354	37.24
2020/21	218,735	16,893	14,880	59,543	27,380	7.61
2019/20	103,246	652	(438)	28,295	12,831	(0.22)
2018/19	95,455	3,263	1,909	28,196	15,788	0.74
2017/18	77,533	1,864	961	23,929	14,028	0.36
2016/17	63,492	2,061	1,229	18,809	13,377	0.49
2015/16	56,015	2,134	1,445	18,086	13,120	0.57
2014/15	52,652	1,454	1,048	17,348	11,618	0.45
2013/14	53,319	2,179	1,570	17,007	10,765	0.73

Source: Annual Report, 2022/23 (pp. 224–225)
