= Maithri Gunaratne =

Sri Lankan politician and lawyer

14th Governor of Central Province
- In office 4 January 2019 – 3 August 2019
- President: Maithripala Sirisena
- Preceded by: P. B. Dissanayake
- Succeeded by: Keerthi Thennakoon

12th Governor of Uva Province
- In office 5 August 2019 – ?
- President: Maithripala Sirisena
- Preceded by: Marshall Perera
- Succeeded by: Raja Collure

Personal details
- Party: United National Freedom Front
- Other political affiliations: United National Front
- Occupation: Politician, lawyer

Maithri Gunaratne is a Sri Lankan politician and lawyer. He was the 14th Governor of the Central Province from January to August 2019, then was the 12th Governor of Uva Province.

== Career ==
A lawyer, Gunaratne is president of the Free Lawyers Organisation. From at least 2009, until 17 January 2017, he was chairman of the Lanka Coal Company. He was removed from the post by Ranjith Siyambalapitiya after being found to have taken "sordid coal deals". He was also chairman of the Ceylon Mineral Sands Corporation.

Gunaratne was a member of the United National Front and was a provincial councillor of Galle. The party split, with him joining the United National Freedom Front. As of 2020, he is general secretary of the party. He has ran in elections for President, Parliament, Provincial Councils, and Urban Councils.

He was appointed Governor of the Central Province on 4 January 2019, by President Maithripala Sirisena. On 18 January, he was appointed to the President's Counsel. As Governor, he closed the weekly night bazaar in Kandy and "arbitrarily" changed the city's roads to be one-lane traffic. He resigned on 3 August 2019. On August 5, he was appointed Governor of the Uva Province by President Sirisena. He had left the office by December 19.

On 22 June 2026, Gunaratne accused President Anura Kumara Dissanayake and Secretary to the Minister of Finance Harshana Suriyapperuma of being responsible for an unpaid US$2,500,000 loan owed to Australia after the money was stolen by a hacker, which they covered up. In October 2026, he was cited for breaching professional ethics and for contempt of court, after threatening the Chief Magistrate of Colombo after he refused bail for his client, Sugeeshwara Bandara, a former private secretary to President Gotabaya Rajapaksa.

Gunaratne has been described as a political philosopher. He is head of the Free Action Center For The Protection of Democracy. The group has participated in protests and, in a statement, said it fought for "democracy, the rule of law, judicial independence, and the protection of the fundamental rights of citizens".

== Personal life ==
In March 2018, Gunaratne was arrested in Kadugannawa for having two shotguns without licensing, being released on bail after the licenses were retrieved. In April 2019, Gunaratne broke environmental laws while rebuilding a house in the Matara District.

Gunaratne has a son who is a lawyer, and another son, Migara Gunaratne, who as of 2022, was a law student. On 25 February 2022, Migara was beaten by four police officers in Peliyagoda after being mistaken for his brother, who was representing a man the police had in their custody. The event was described as state torture.
