= Hemakumara Nanayakkara =

Sri Lankan politician

Hon. Hemakumara Nanayakkara
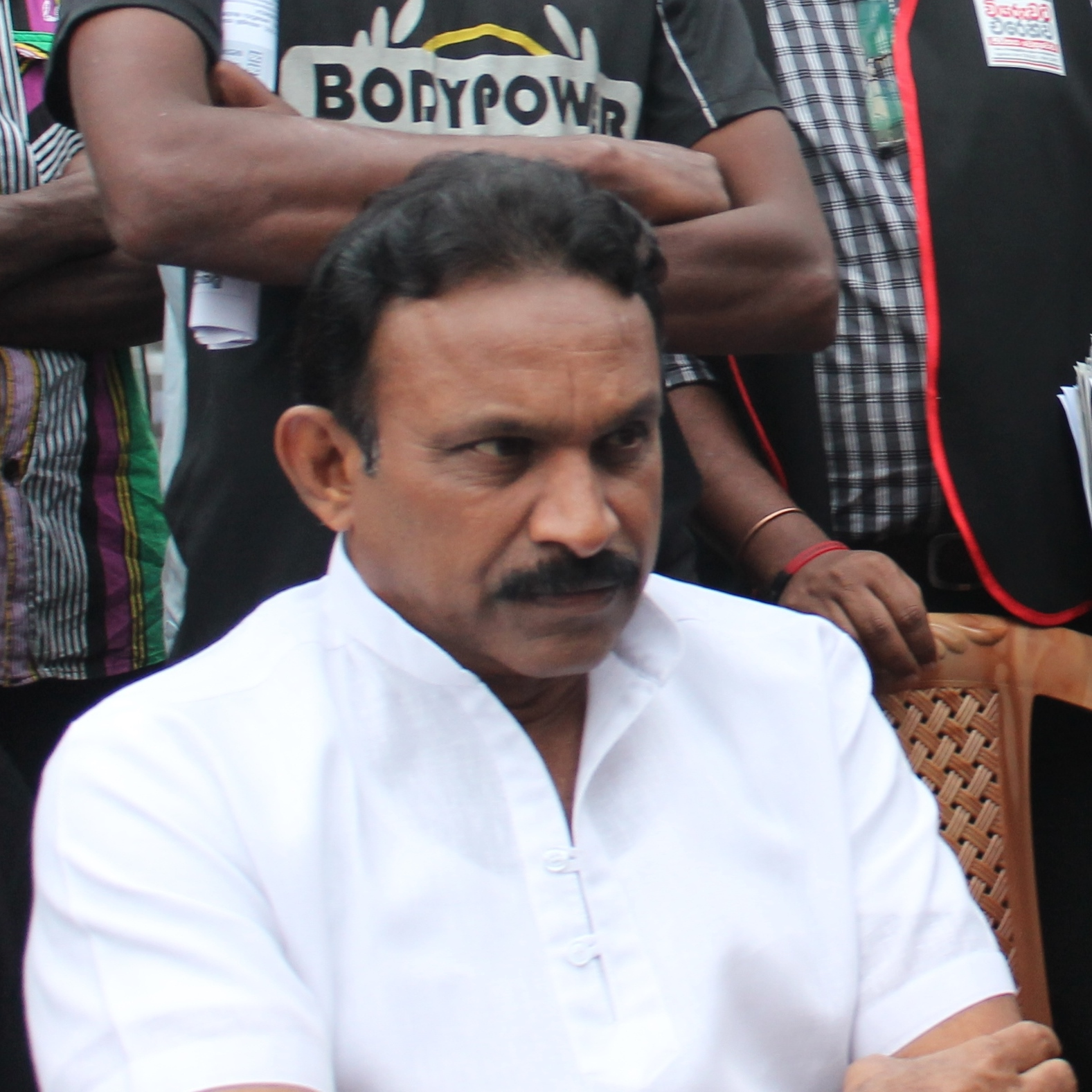
- Nanayakkara in 2014

7th Governor of Western Province
- In office 12 April 2018 – 31 December 2018
- President: Maithripala Sirisena
- Preceded by: M. P. Jayasinghe
- Succeeded by: Azath Salley

7th Governor of Southern Province
- In office 23 January 2015 – 11 April 2018
- President: Maithripala Sirisena
- Preceded by: Kumari Balasuriya
- Succeeded by: Marshal Perera

Deputy Minister of Agriculture
- In office 2007–2010

Member of Parliament for Galle District
- In office 1989–1994
- In office 2000–2010

Personal details
- Born: 12 July 1953 (age 73)
- Party: Sarvajana Balaya
- Other political affiliations: United People's Freedom Alliance; United National Party; Mawbima Janatha Pakshaya
- Relations: Vasudeva Nanayakkara (brother); Yasapalitha Nanayakkara (brother)
- Education: Nalanda College, Colombo
- Profession: Politics

Hemakumara Wickramathilaka Nanayakkara (born 12 July 1953) is a Sri Lankan politician who served as the governor of Western Province, from April to December 2018. He has also been the governor of Southern Province, a former member of the Parliament of Sri Lanka and a former government minister. Nanayakkara played active roles for the United National Party victory at the 2001 general election. He was appointed as minister soon after the election. In 2007, he decided to support the UPFA. In 2012, Nanayakkara quit the UPFA to form his own party called Ruhunu Janatha Party. The party joined United National Party at the 2015 Presidential election to support the common candidate.

== See also ==
- List of political families in Sri Lanka

Political offices
Preceded by K. C. Logeswaran	Governor of Western Province; 2018	Succeeded by Azath Salley
Preceded by Kumari Balasuriya	Governor of Southern Province; 2015–2018	Succeeded by Marshal Perera
