= Mellony Wijesinghe =

Sri Lankan netball player (2002–2019)

Personal information
- Born: 2002
- Died: 20 October 2019 (aged 16–17) Maharagama
- Occupation: netball player

Netball career
- Playing position: goal shooter

Mellony Wijesinghe (Sinhala: මෙලනී විජේසිංහ) (2002 – 20 October 2019) was a Sri Lankan netball player who played in the position of goal shooter in international netball tournaments. She died on 20 October 2019 from suspected leukaemia. She was treated by Dr Eliyantha White in July 2019 for a shoulder injury after which she developed loss of red blood cells, however tests conducted in India and South Africa have not revealed any trace of leukaemia.

She also served as vice captain of the national youth netball team until her death.

== Education ==
She initially pursued her primary education in Vihara Maha Devi Balika Vidyalaya, Kiribathgoda and received a scholarship to join Visakha Vidyalaya.

== Playing career ==
While pursuing her education, she continued to play netball in domestic and international level. She made her World Netball Youth Cup during the 2017 Netball World Youth Cup. Sri Lanka finished at nineteenth position during the World Cup tournament. She was appointed the vice-captain of the national youth team in June 2019. She was also a key member of the Sri Lankan youth team which finished at third position at the 2019 Asian Youth Netball Championship. During the competition, she emerged as the top goal scorer with 106 and received the Best Shooter Award.

She was compared to Sri Lankan national veteran netball player Tharjini Sivalingam mainly for her shooting skills. She was groomed to take over the national team after emerging in youth level.

== Death ==
She was complaining of a shoulder pain after competing at the All Island Schools Netball Championship in August 2019. She became ill and was subsequently admitted to the Apeksha Hospital in Maharagama. It was later discovered that she was confronting severe Acute Myeloid Leukaemia. She died at the hospital on 20 October 2019 after receiving treatment in the Intensive Care Unit.
