= Shangri-La Colombo =

Hotel in Colombo, Sri Lanka

Shangri–La Colombo
- Logo of Shangri-La Colombo

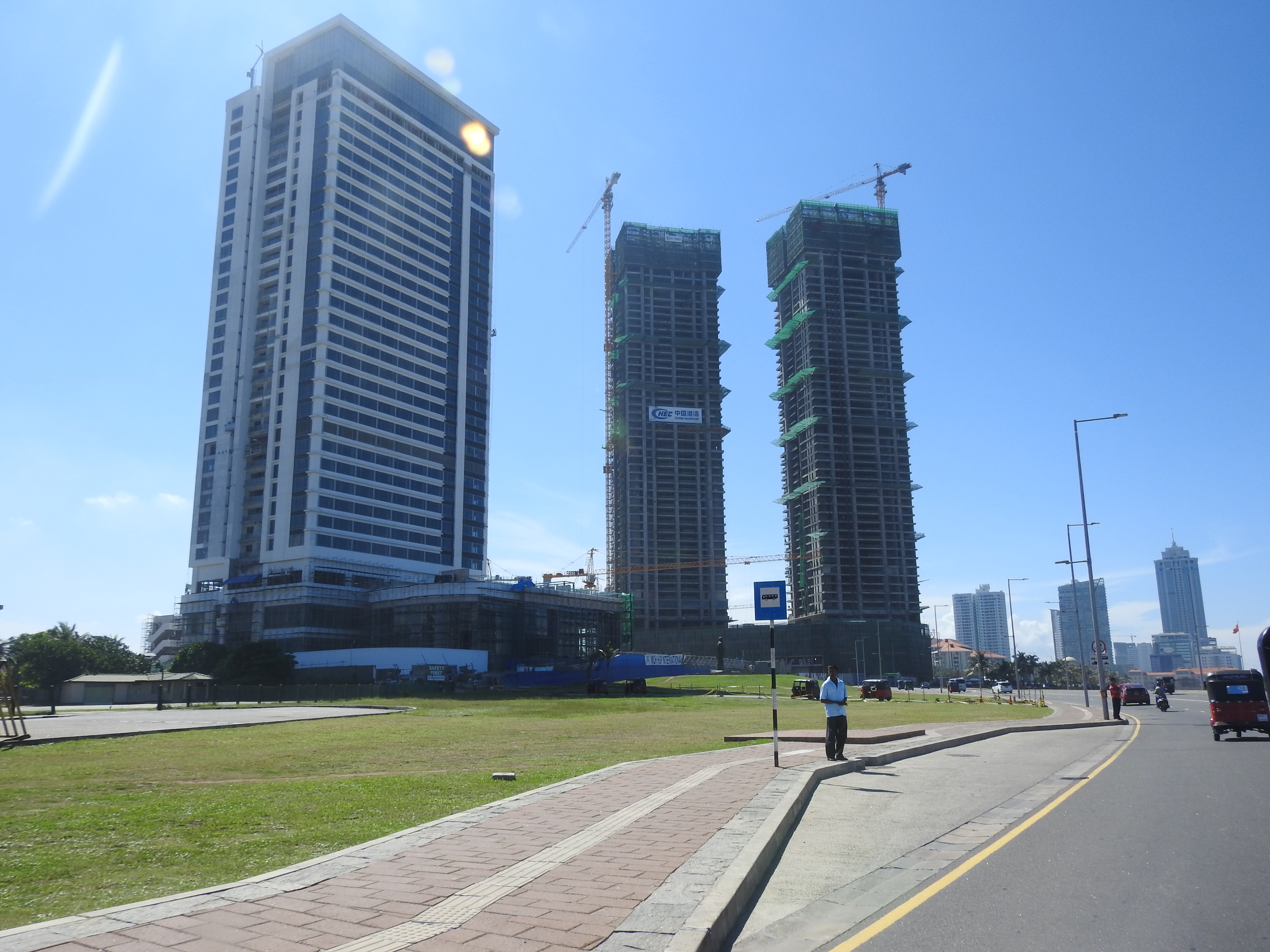
- Shangri-La Colombo as part of the One Galle Face complex

- Location within Central Colombo

General information
- Location: 1 Galle Road, Colombo 02, Sri Lanka
- Coordinates: 6.927961°N 79.844670°E
- Opening: 16 November 2017
- Owner: Shangri-La Hotels (90%)
- Operator: Timothy Wright

Technical details
- Floor count: 31

Design and construction
- Architects: Chao Tse Ann & Partners; MICD Associates; Handel Architects; LRF Designers

Other information
- Number of rooms: 500
- Number of suites: 34
- Number of restaurants: 5
- Number of bars: 2

Website
- shangri-la.com/colombo/shangrila/

Shangri-La Colombo is a 5-star hotel in Colombo, Sri Lanka. Owned by Shangri-La Hotels, the property is part of the larger One Galle Face development project at the site of the Old Army Headquarters. It is the second Shangri-La hotel on the island (after Shangri-La's Hambantota Golf Resort & Spa) and the 101st hotel of the chain of Shangri-La Hotels world-wide. The hotel was opened on 11 November 2017. The property has 500 rooms, and has room to accommodate up to 2,000 conference guests.

== 2019 Easter Sunday bombings ==
The Shangri-La was one of three sites of the 2019 Sri Lanka Easter bombings along with the Kingsbury and Cinnamon Grand Colombo. Sri Lankan celebrity chef Shantha Mayadunne and her daughter, who were having breakfast in the hotel, were among the fatalities. Sri Lankan cricketer Hasitha Boyagoda was also having breakfast in the hotel when the bombing took place, escaping with only minor injuries. Three of the four children of Anders Holch Povlsen were also killed in the attack.
