= 2019 Sri Lanka Railway strike =

2019 railway strike in Sri Lanka
- Part of railway strike in Sri Lanka
- Date: 25 September 2019 – 7 October 2019
- Location: Sri Lanka
- Methods: Strikes and protests also include work-to-rule, Go Slow Down
- Status: Caused by the labourers demanding high salary increments from the government.

Parties
Sri Lanka Railways	Rail unions: Locomotive Engine Operators Union; Sri Lanka Railways Guard Union; Railway Drivers Union; Railway Station Masters Union

Lead figures
Maithripala Sirisena, President	

The 2019 Sri Lanka Railway strike was an industrial dispute which happened for 12 consecutive days between the Sri Lanka Railways and the Government of Sri Lanka over the salary increments. It was considered to be one of the longest railway strikes in the country since 2008. The strike began in late September from midnight and ended up on 7 October 2019.

On 3 October 2019, the Sri Lankan government issued an ordinary gazette notification declaring the railway service as an essential service. It also meant that the leave of government employees were officially cancelled with immediate effect.

On 7 October 2019, the strike action was called off following discussions with the Minister of Transport and Civil Aviation.

== Background ==
Sri Lanka Railways is one of the most accessible, cheapest and significant modes of transportation in Sri Lanka. However the railway transport in the country has been significantly affected over the years due to the frequent protests held by the labourers of the Railway Department demanding for higher salaries. These issues have often caused severe difficulties for the general public to utilise the railway transport system. Railway transport is the most inefficient transport mode in Sri Lanka as the Sri Lanka Railways often run with severe losses.

== Response ==
As a remedy to the strike action, about 3000 railway employees who were on strike were suspended. The Sri Lanka Railways was also reported to have lost Rs 15 million in income each day due to the strikes. The rail strikes were highly criticised by the general public who prefer the relevant transport as a main transport mode.
