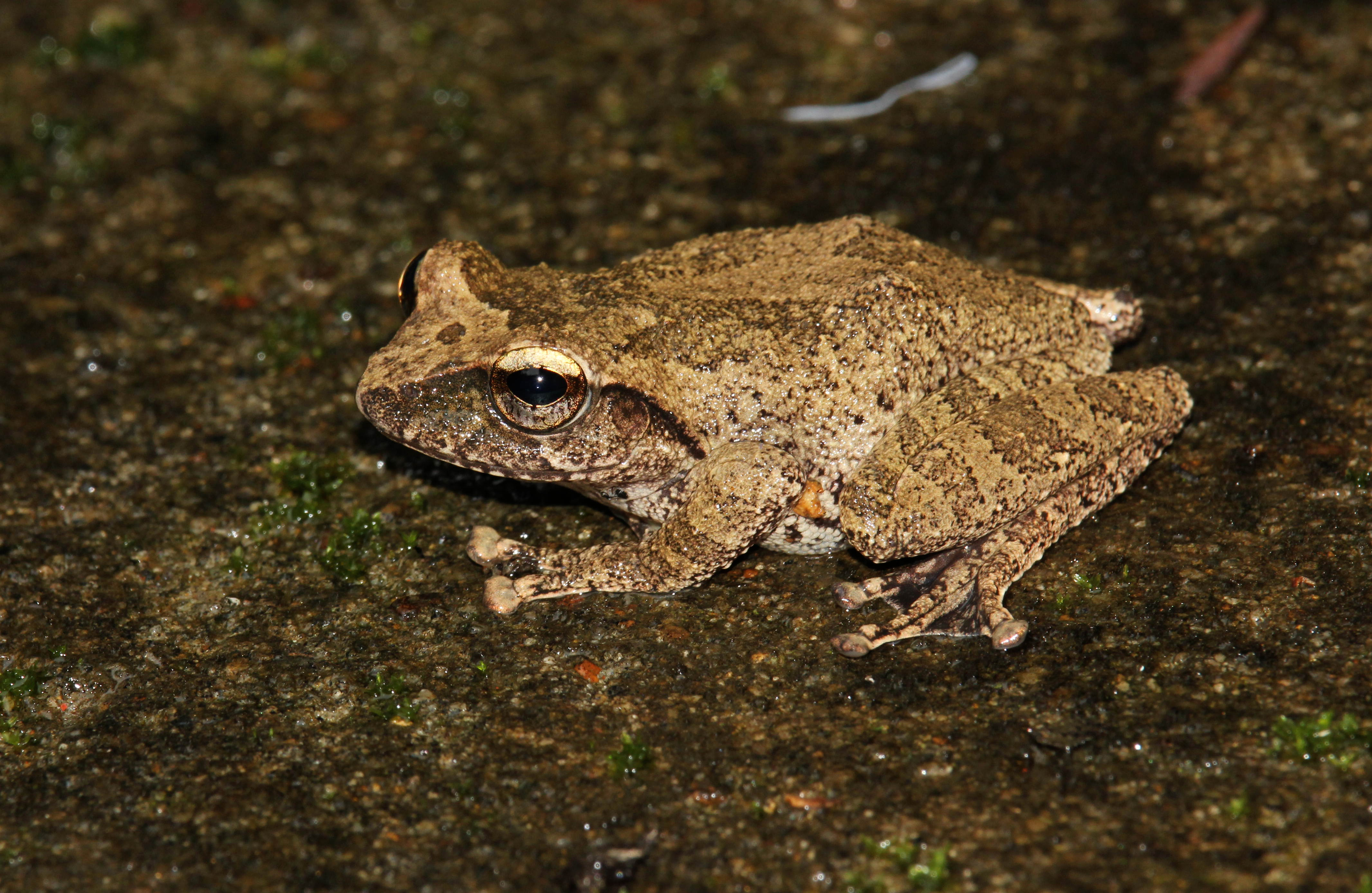

Conservation status
- Endangered (IUCN 3.1)

Scientific classification
- Kingdom: Animalia
- Phylum: Chordata
- Class: Amphibia
- Order: Anura
- Family: Rhacophoridae
- Genus: Pseudophilautus
- Species: P. silus

Binomial name
- Pseudophilautus silus (Manamendra-Arachchi & Pethiyagoda, 2005)

Synonyms
- Philautus silus Manamendra-Arachchi & Pethiyagoda, 2005

= Pseudophilautus silus =

Species of amphibian

Pseudophilautus silus, known as pug-nosed shrub frog is a species of frogs in the family Rhacophoridae. It is endemic to southern Sri Lanka and known from the both sides of the Horton Plains (near Agarapatana and Haputale).

Its natural habitats are closed-canopy forests but it also occurs in open, anthropogenic habitats. It is an uncommon species threatened by the encroachment of tea plantations, firewood collection, expanding human settlements, and agro-chemical pollution.
