= Seetha Arambepola =

Sri Lankan governor

Hon. Seetha Arambepola
- සීතා අරඹෙපොල சீதா அரம்பேபொல

State Minister of Skills Development, Vocational Education, Research and Innovation
- In office 12 August 2020 – 9 July 2022

Member of Parliament for National List
- In office 20 August 2020 – 24 September 2024

10th Governor of the Western Province
- In office 21 November 2019 – 19 March 2020
- Preceded by: A. J. M. Muzammil
- Succeeded by: Roshan Goonetileke

Personal details
- Born: Seetha Arambepola; 11 September 1974 (age 51)
- Party: Sri Lanka Podujana Peramuna
- Education: University of Sri Jayewardenepura; University of Colombo; Devi Balika Vidyalaya; Viharamahadevi Balika Vidyalaya - Kiribathgoda
- Occupation: ENT Surgeon

Seetha Arambepola ( Sinhala: සීතා අරඹෙපොල Tamil: சீதா அரம்பேபொல) is a Sri Lankan politician, surgeon, and former Member of the Parliament from National List. She was the State Minister of Skills Development, Vocational Education, Research and Innovation. Currently she is the State Minister of Health.

An Otorhinolaryngology specialist, she was a strong supporter of Gotabaya Rajapaksa in his presidential election in 2019 and briefly served as the Governor of the Western Province from December 2019 to March 2020 having been appointed by President Gotabaya Rajapaksa. She resigned as Governor on March 19, 2020, to enter parliament from the National List of the Sri Lanka Podujana Peramuna. She was succeeded by Marshal of the Air Force Roshan Goonetileke.

== Education ==
Seetha Arambepola had her school education at Viharamahadevi Balika Vidyalaya - Kiribathgoda and Devi Balika Vidyalaya, Colombo 08 from 1985 to 1993. She received her Bachelor of Medicine, Bachelor of Surgery (MBBS) degree from University of Sri Jayawardanepura (1996–2002) and graduated from University of Colombo in Doctor of Medicine (MD) (2007–2011) and gained a DOHNS Otorhinolaryngology from the Royal College of Surgeons Edinburgh (2014–2015).

== Professional career ==
- Registrar in ENT, National Hospital, Colombo (Oct 2007-Jun 2011)
- Senior Registrar, Colombo South Teaching Hospital (Oct 2011-Jan 2013)
- Speciality Doctor in ENT, Queen Elizabeth Hospital, King's Lynn (Feb 2013-Jul 2014)
- Consultant ENT surgeon, General Hospital, Mannar (Jul 2014- Sep 2014)
- Acting Consultant Otorhinolaryngologist, National Hospital, Colombo (Sep 2014-Dec 2015)
- Senior Lecture, South Asian Institute of Technology and Medicine (Jan 2015–Present)
- Consultant ENT, Head and Neck Surgeon, Private Sector Reputed Hospitals (Jan 2015–Present)

She authored a book in Sinhala on ear, nose and throat related ailments.

== Political career ==
She was a prominent speaker at Viyathmaga campaign which was started in 2016 to promote Gotabaya Rajapaksa as the presidential candidate for the presidential election. held in November 2019. On 21 November 2019 she was appointed as the Governor of Western Province by president Gotabhaya Rajapakse.

She was appointed State Minister for Skills Development, Vocational Education, Research and Innovation by president Gotabhaya Rajapakse on 12 August 2020.

== See also ==
- List of governors of Western Province
