= Raja Collure =

Sri Lankan politician (1938–2021)

12th Governor of North Western Province
- In office ? – 7 December 2021
- President: Gotabaya Rajapaksa
- Preceded by: A. J. M. Muzammil
- Succeeded by: Wasantha Karannagoda

13th Governor of Uva Province
- In office 21 November 2019 – ?
- President: Gotabaya Rajapaksa
- Preceded by: Maithri Gunaratne
- Succeeded by: A. J. M. Muzammil

Member of the Parliament of Sri Lanka
- In office 8 October 1991 – 24 June 1994
- In office 17 October 2000 – 7 February 2004

Personal details
- Born: Darrel Chandra Raja Collure; 3 June 1938
- Died: 7 December 2021 (aged 83) Colombo, Sri Lanka
- Party: People's Alliance; Communist Party of Sri Lanka
- Occupation: Politician, lawyer

Darrel Chandra Raja Collure (3 June 1938 – 7 December 2021) was a Sri Lankan politician and lawyer. A member of the Communist Party of Sri Lanka, he was a member of the Parliament of Sri Lanka, and was Governor of the Uva and the Governor of the North Western Provinces.

== Early life and education ==
Collure was born on 3 June 1938. He studied at Celyon Law College, during which he was president of the Ceylon National Students Union, the first students' union in Sri Lanka; he helped reorganize the union 32 years larer.

== Career ==
A lawyer, Collure was a founding member of the Bar Association of Sri Lanka. Between 1981 and 1985, he edited several newspapers in Prague. He was a member of the editorial board of the World Marxist Review.

Collure was a member of the People's Alliance and Communist Party of Sri Lanka, joining the latter in February 1959. In 1972, he was elected to the central committee. He then joined the party's political bureau. From 1994 to 2001, he was general secretary of the Communist Party.

Collure was chairman of the Communist Party at the time of his death. On October 21, 2021, the Communist Party announced that Collure was removed as chairman after he, as Governor, was accused of considering to lower teachers' salaries. The district court in Colombo ordered his removal be reversed, because the party cannot discipline him for what he does as Governor.

Collure was a member of the Parliament of Sri Lanka, from 8 October 1991, to 24 June 1994, and agin from 17 October 2000, to 7 February 2004. While in Parliament, he was chairman of the Official Languages Commission. He was Governor of the Uva Province, from 21 November 2019, being appointed by President Gotabaya Rajapaksa. He was Governor of the North Western Province until his death.

== Death ==
Collure died on 7 December 2021, aged 83, at the KDU Hospital in Colombo, from COVID-19, which he was diagnosed with on 3 December. He was cremated on 7 December, at Borella Cemetry.
