= Kapila Jayasekera =

Sri Lankan politician

Kapila Jayasekera is the governor of the Uva Province of Sri Lanka and a former Ministry Secretary.
