= Azath Salley =

Sri Lankan politician

Hon. Azath Salley
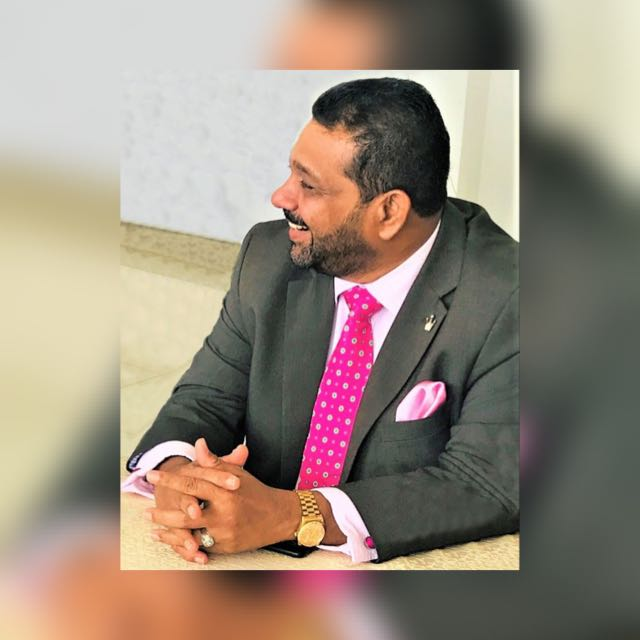

Governor of Western Province
- In office 4 January 2019 – 3 June 2019
- President: Maithripala Sirisena
- Preceded by: Hemakumara Nanayakkara
- Succeeded by: A. J. M. Muzammil

Personal details
- Born: Mohamed Azath Sanoon Salley; 18 September 1963 (age 63) Colombo, Sri Lanka
- Citizenship: Sri Lanka
- Party: National Unity Alliance (NUA)
- Other political affiliations: MTNA, UPFA, UNP, SLMC (past)
- Spouse(s): Renoza, Rusna
- Children: Amina Salley and Nafees Salley
- Education: DS Senanayake College, Colombo
- Occupation: Politician
- Profession: Banker

Mohamed Azath Sanoon Salley (Sinhala: මොහොමඩ් අසාත් සනූන් සාලි; born 18 September 1963) is a Sri Lankan politician and the eighth governor of the Western Province.

Salley was the deputy mayor of Colombo in the early 2000s, and was the acting mayor of Colombo as well as the founder/leader of the National Unity Alliance (NUA).

He has one daughter, Amina Salley, and one son, Nafees Salley.

In May 2013, Salley was arrested and later released by the Sri Lankan Forces under the Prevention of Terrorism Act (PTA) after he supposedly called Muslims to launch an "armed struggle" during an interview, the charges were proven to be baseless and he was acquitted.

Salley founded the National Unity Front, a National political party. He was a member of the Central Provincial Council. He worked in partnership with the United Arab Emirates High Commission in Colombo to help the needy during the Islamic Holy Month of Ramazan.

On 4 January 2019 he was sworn in as the eighth Governor of the Western Province. However, as a result of the 2019 Easter Bomb attacks by radical thowheed jamath Islamists, Azath Salley resigned. All the allegations against Azath Salley were baseless and he was acquitted on the 2nd of December 2021.

Salley was somewhat of a controversial figure after the COVID-19 pandemic, as one of the only Muslim leaders in the island to talk against the government's forceful cremation of COVID-19 victims.

== Azath Salley Foundation ==
Before his tenure as deputy mayor of Colombo, Salley founded the Azath Salley Foundation with intent to distribute food and dry rations among the less fortunate people in Sri Lanka.

The foundation donates food, dry rations and financial assistance to less fortunate every year in collaboration with corporate sponsors and high commissions.

== National Unity Alliance ==
Salley is presently the leader of the National Unity Alliance, a registered and active political party in Sri Lanka.

Salley is also the General Secretary of the party.

According to Election Commission's records, Adam Gany is the chairman of the Party.

Political offices
Preceded by Hemakumara Nanayakkara	Governor of Western Province; 2019	Succeeded by A. J. M. Muzammil
