= Marini De Livera =

Sri Lankan lawyer and social activist

- මරිනි ද ලිවේරා மாரினி டி லிவேரா
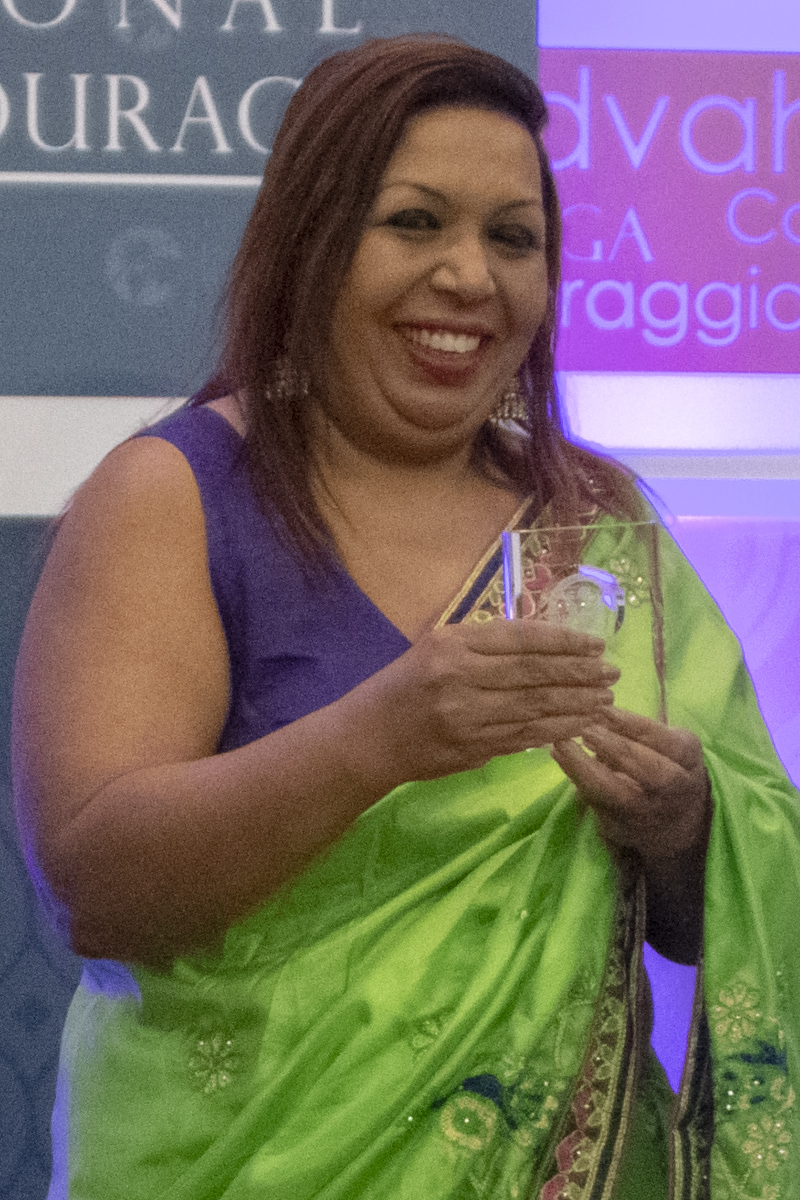
- Education: Trinity College, London
- Occupations: diplomat, lawyer, social activist
- Awards: 2019 International Women of Courage Award

Marini De Livera (Sinhala: මරිනි ද ලිවේරා; Tamil: மாரினி டி லிவேரா) is a Sri Lankan lawyer, social activist, and artist who also served as former chairperson of the National Child Protection Authority (NCPA) in Sri Lanka. In 2019, she was awarded the International Women of Courage Award by the United States Department of State.

== Career ==
Marini De Livera holds a Post-Graduate diploma in human rights and also holds a degree in Speech & Drama at the Trinity College, London. She is also credited for her crucial social services in Sri Lanka especially known for helping women and child victims who are affected due to criminal activities and also had a brief stint as Human Rights trainer for Sri Lanka Army within the broader context and complexity of the Civil War in Sri Lanka that ended in 2009.

In April 2017, she was appointed as the new chairperson of National Child Protection Authority by Sri Lankan President Maithripala Sirisena replacing Natasha Balendran who resigned the job for personal reasons.

She was presented the International Women of Courage Award on 8 March 2019, (an award which is presented to women for their remarkable achievements which often go unnoticed on the International Women's Day) by US State for her crucial contributions for uplifting the standards of women in Sri Lanka as she was nominated as one of the 10 recipients for the award.

In 2020, Marini De Livera established Sisters at Law, a non-profit organization which includes safe shelter to extend comprehensive support for women and children who need legal aid, housing and nutrition, counseling, educational opportunities, and community support.

Marini de Livera is also an artist using painting to process the secondary trauma in the storytelling she encounters in her legal cases, for awareness-building, and for advocacy. Her practice also includes participatory performance for educational purposes and to raise awareness of the lived experiences of violence, resilience, and survival.
