= V. Vamadevan =

Indian–Sri Lankan cinematographer (1935–2019)

Vairamuthu Vamadevan වෛරමුත්තු වාමදේවන්
- வைரமுத்து வாமதேவன்
- Born: Vairamuthu Vamadevan; May 22, 1935; Achchuveli, Sri Lanka
- Died: February 14, 2019 (aged 83); Colombo, Sri Lanka
- Other names: Vaama
- Education: Kopay Christian College
- Occupations: Actor, cinematographer
- Years active: 1957–2017
- Spouse: Siththima
- Children: 4
- Awards: Best Cinematographer

Vairamuthu Vamadevan (22 May 1935 – 14 February 2019 වෛරමුත්තු වාමදේවන්, Tamil: வைரமுத்து வாமதேவன்), popularly known as V. Vamadevan was a prolific cinematographer in Sri Lankan cinema. Considered as one of the pioneer cinematographers in Sinhala cinema, Vamadevan made several critically acclaimed films in a career spanning more than six decades.

== Personal life ==
Vamadevan was born on September 16, 1916, in Achchuveli, Jaffna, Sri Lanka. He completed his education from Kopay Christian College, Jaffna.

He was married to his longtime partner, Siththima. The couple had one son: Darshan, three daughters: Priyatharshini, Indumathi and Vasuki. He was survived by his family at his residence No. 86, Muhandiram Road, Kollupitiya, Colombo 03.

He died on 14 February 2019 at the age of 83 while receiving treatments at Colombo National Hospital. Funeral was held on 17 February 2019.

== Career ==
He was obsessed with cinema while in college, where he used to keep film magazines in his textbooks and was beaten more than once. Eventually, he ran away from home to somehow go to India and contribute to the film industry in Madras. However in 1957, he joined with Ceylon Studio on Kirula Road in Colombo as an assistant technician. A group of Indian technicians worked hard to start a laboratory at the Ceylon Art Gallery. where Vamadevan also got a job as a laboratory assistant under the guidance of P. Mahendran. During this period, Ceylon Studio has been working on the film Daskama. Then in B. A. W. Jayamanne's film Vanaliya allowed him to work as an assistant cameraman for the first time. In the film, he worked under M. D. Sumanasekara, the first Sinhala cinematographer in Ceylon cinema. Then Vamadevan was the assistant cameraman of Oba Dutu Daa, Hadisi Vivahaya and Kawata Andarae. During this period, he met the friend Gamini Fonseka. He first met Gamini when the film Sri 296 was made in Ceylon Studios. He then worked as an assistant cameraman and assisted in the completion of the film Seegiri Kashyapa. Meanwhile, Vamadevan trained as an assistant cameraman under renowned cinematographer M. S. Ananda.

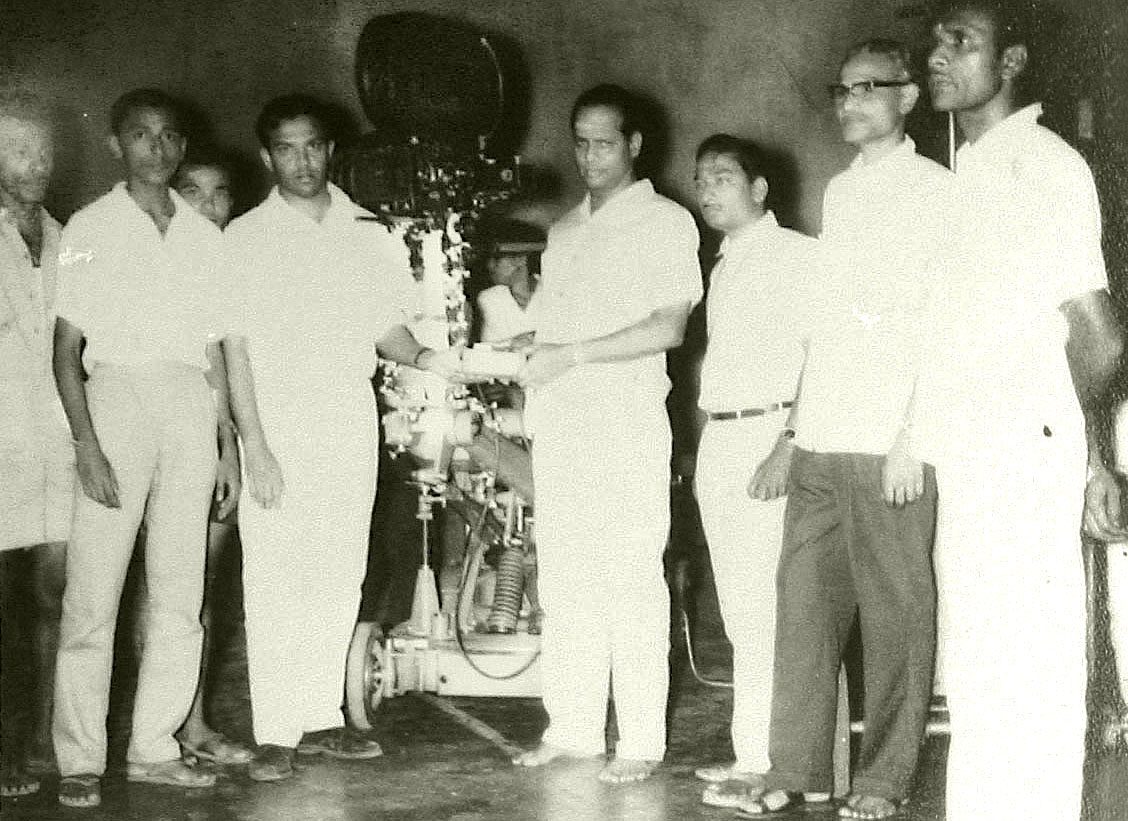
Ataweni Pudumaya Opening in 1968 Wijaya Studios, (Vamadevan is third from right)

At that time, Vamadevan met Shivanandan, the advertising manager of Cinemas Limited and was able to make his intentions to work with V. Rameshwaram who was the Managing Director of Cinemas Limited, India. But by then, Cinemas had also stopped making films in India and was building a huge studio, Vijaya Studio in Hendala, Wattala in Sri Lanka. Although Vamadevan was an assistant cameraman, he assisted with everything in the Vijaya studio in 1960. When at Vijaya Studio, his friendship with Gamini Fonseka blossomed at the Vijaya studio. As a request from Gamini, Vamadevan made his maiden cinematography in the film Oba Dutu Da directed by Shivanandan. Then, Vamadevan joined with the filmmaker Masthan and Gamini forced Masthan to give cinematography of the film Sura Chauraya in 1967.

Since then, Vamadevan has excelled in a number of films including; Aatma Pooja, Edath Sūrayā Adath Sūrayā, Sūrayangeth Sūrayā, Hondama Welāva, Hondai Narakai, Hita Honda Minihek, Kavuda Rajā, Deviyani Oba Kohida, Apsarā, Chin Chin Nōnā, Uthumāṇeni, Sabeethā, Mayurigē Kathāva, Bāndurā Mal, Sakviti Suvaya, Sāgarayak Mæda, Koṭi Valigaya, Satyagrahaṇaya and Nomiyena Minisun. He has also contributed to several foreign films such as Rampage, The Further Adventures of Tennessee Buck, and Mother Teresa: In the Name of God's Poor. He is the first cinematographer to win the award for the Best Cinematographer at first Presidential Awards Ceremony for the film Rampage.

Vamadevan became a film producer with the film Ra Manamali. Among the films directed by Gamini Fonseka, the only film Vamadevan did not act in was Ra Manamali. The film was one of Vamadevan's excellent black and white photography films. In 2010, he was awarded the lifetime Rana Thisara Award at the Sarasaviya Awards. In 2014, he was represented the film industry on the Board of Directors of the National Film Corporation of Sri Lanka. In 2018, he was honored with Lifetime Achievement Award at the Jaffna International Film Festival. At the 72nd anniversary celebrations of Sinhala cinema, Vamadevan was recognized and honored him with awards for one last time. His last cinema contribution came through the film Surya which is yet to release.

== Filmography ==
Year	Film	Roles	Ref.
1962	Ranmuthu Duwa	Assistant cinematographer	
1967	Sura Chauraya	Cinematographer	
1968	Ataweni Pudumaya	Cinematographer	
1969	Suryangeth Suraya	Cinematographer	
1969	Uthum Sthriya	Cinematographer	
1970	Aathma Pooja	Cinematographer	
1973	Hondama Welawa	Cinematographer	
1973	Hondai Narakai	Cinematographer	
1973	Hondata Hondai	Cinematographer	
1974	Sheela	Cinematographer	
1974	Duppathage Hithawatha	Cinematographer	
1976	Kawuda Raja	Cinematographer	
1976	Onna Mame Kella Panapi	Cinematographer	
1976	Adarei Man Adarei	Cinematographer	
1977	Neela	Cinematographer	
1977	Deviyani Oba Kohida	Cinematographer	
1977	Chin Chin Nona	Cinematographer	
1977	Aege Adara Kathawa	Cinematographer	
1978	Sithaka Suwanda	Cinematographer	
1978	Mage Ran Putha	Cinematographer	
1978	Apsara	Cinematographer	
1978	Rampage	Cinematographer	
1979	Subhani	Cinematographer	
1980	Uthumaneni	Cinematographer	
1980	Sabeetha	Cinematographer	
1980	Miyurige Kathawa	Cinematographer	
1982	Ra Manamali	Cinematographer, producer	
1982	Sagarayak Meda	Cinematographer	
1981	Bandura Mal	Cinematographer	
1982	Sakvithi Suwaya	Cinematographer	
1982	Jeewithayen Jeewithayak	Cinematographer	
1982	Paaramitha	Cinematographer	
1982	Miss Mallika	Cinematographer	
1986	Koti Waligaya	Cinematographer	
1987	Sathyagrahanaya	Cinematographer	
1987	Kele Kella	Cinematographer	
1988	The Further Adventures of Tennessee Buck	Second camera operator	
1994	Pawana Ralu Viya	Camera Operator	
1996	Hitha Honda Geheniyak	Cinematographer, Still Photographer	
1997	Mother Teresa: In the Name of God's Poor	Camera Operator	
2001	Poronduwa	Camera Operator	
