= Shantha Mayadunne =

Sri Lankan chef and television personality (1951–2019)

- Born: 4 April 1951; Sri Lanka
- Died: 21 April 2019 (aged 68); Sharngril-la Hotel, Colombo, Sri Lanka
- Occupations: Chef, television personality
- Spouse: Kumar Mayadunne
- Children: Nisanga Mayadunne, Tharanga Mayadunne

Shantha Mayadunne (Sinhala: ශාන්තා මායාදුන්නේ; 4 April 1951 – 21 April 2019) was a Sri Lankan chef and television personality.

== Career ==
She had thirty years of experience in the culinary arts and became one of the most popular Sri Lankan television chefs. She learned advanced international cooking techniques at cooking schools in many countries including Australia, UK, Singapore, Thailand and India. As her popularity grew, she started to conduct classes, through workshops and mass media programs. She published two books, the first in 2001 and the second in 2005.

== Death ==
She was killed together with her daughter on 21 April 2019 by a suicide bomber during a series of terrorist attacks in Sri Lanka, while they were both at the Shangri-La Hotel in Colombo for breakfast.
