= One Galle Face =

Apartment building in Sri Lanka

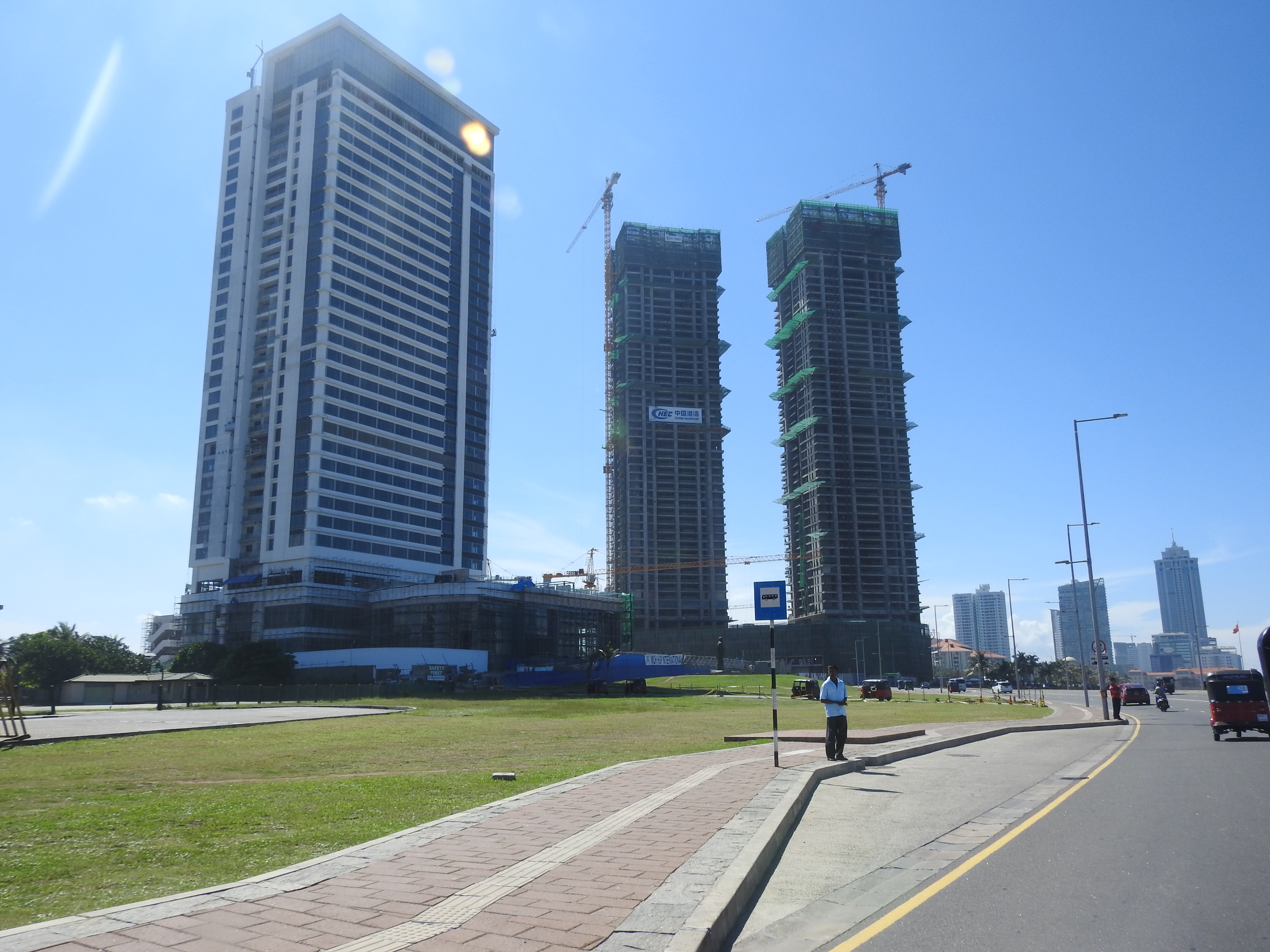

- Location within Central Colombo

General information
- Type: Mixed-use
- Location: 1A, Centre Road, Galle Face, Colombo 02, Sri Lanka
- Coordinates: 06°55′40″N 79°50′41″E
- Completed: 2017-2019
- Opening: 8 November 2019
- Cost: US$608 million
- Owner: Shangri-La (90%)

Height
- Top floor: 51

Technical details
- Floor count: 51 (two apartment towers) 3,733 (residential); 33 (58,166 Office space) (office tower); 31 (hotel); 7 (mall) (74,746 Commercial spaces)
- Floor area: 46,000 m^{2} (490,000 sq ft)

Design and construction
- Architects: Chao Tse Ann & Partners (hotel); Handel Architects (hotel); LRF Designers (hotel; interior); DP Architects (residences, retail, offices); Mapsdesign (residences; design); BTR (HK) (residences, offices; interior); DDG (retail; interior); MICD Associates (all); Bensley Design Studios (all; landscape)
- Developer: Shangri-La Group - Asia
- Main contractor: Woh Hup International (phase 1); China Harbour Engineering (phase 2 & 3)

Website
- https://www.onegalleface.com/

One Galle Face is a mixed-use complex of buildings near the Galle Face Green in Colombo, Sri Lanka. It is also Sri Lanka's first internationally and developed and managed mixed use project and was officially opened on 8 November 2019. The facility consists of four skyscrapers, one which will be open for businesses to set up offices, two for the residential component, and the fourth as part of a hotel. A shopping mall is also part of the project. The premises in its entirety is owned by Shangri-La.

The twin towers of the residential component are tied as the 4th-tallest structures in the country, at 194 m (636 ft). The towers are 51 storeys each, with two-, three-, or four bedroom apartments of 161.0 m^{2} (1,733 ft^{2}), 255.0 m^{2} (2,745 ft^{2}), and 329.0 m^{2} (3,541 ft^{2}), respectively. They will also contain 16 penthouses.

Shangri-La Colombo opened on 16 November 2017, as the first of the four project components to do so. The hotel has 500 rooms and 41 serviced apartments.

== Shopping mall ==
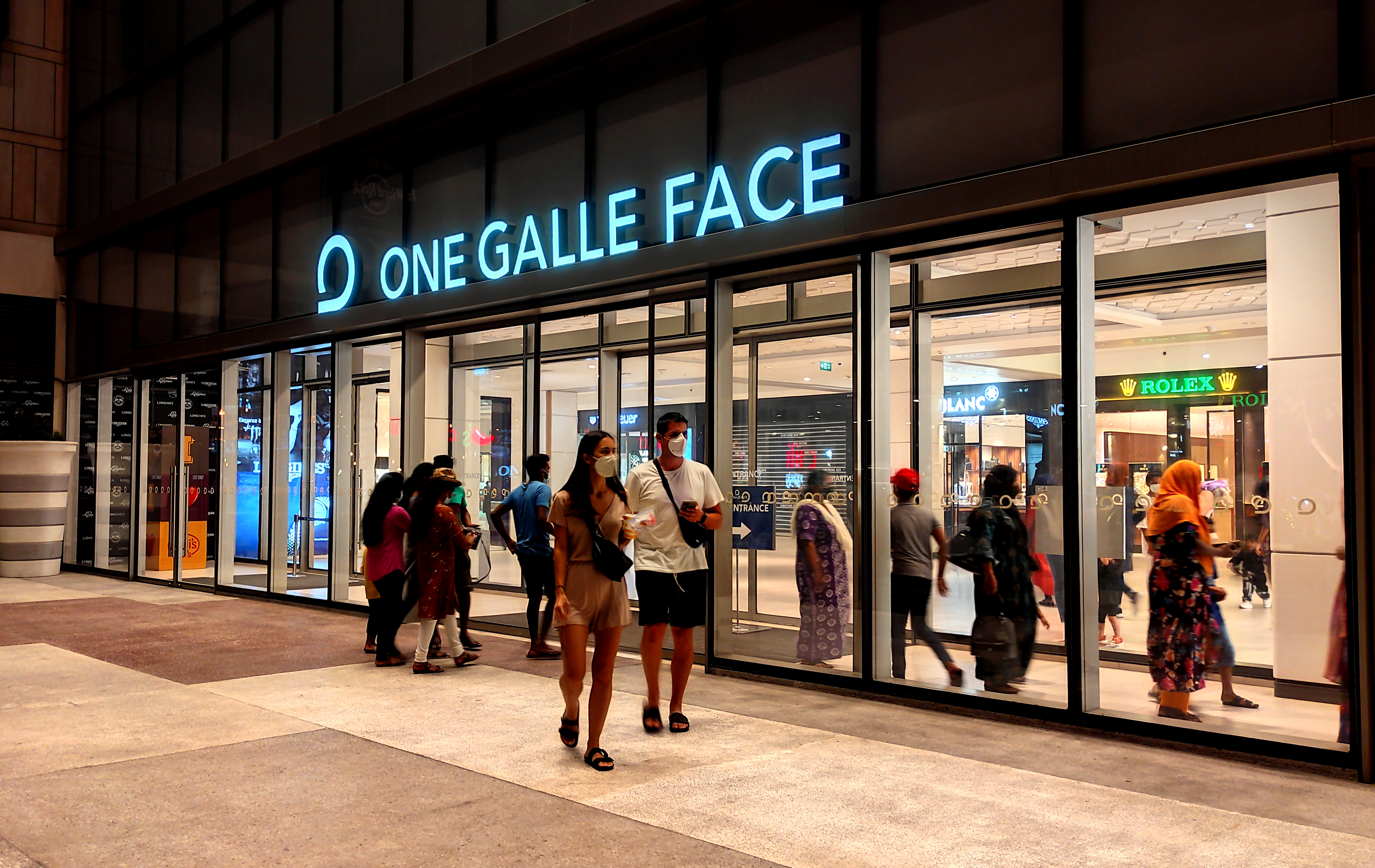
Mall Entrance

The mall consists of 46,000 square metres (490,000 sq ft) of lettable commercial space distributed among seven floors, scheduled for a June 2019 opening. It is planned to contain a multiplex (operated by PVR Cinemas), a 1,600 square metres (17,000 sq ft) food court (operated by Food Studio), a supermarket, and a planned capacity of 300 units of retail, entertainment and dining outlets. Softlogic became one of the first confirmed tenants of the mall in July 2017, with Odel slated to open a multi-level department store with a floor space of 5,058.9 square metres (54,454 sq ft). Keells Super will also operate a gourmet supermarket within the Mall. The mall was opened to the public on 8 November 2019 by President Maithripala Sirisena which also marked his last inauguration ceremony as the President of the country.

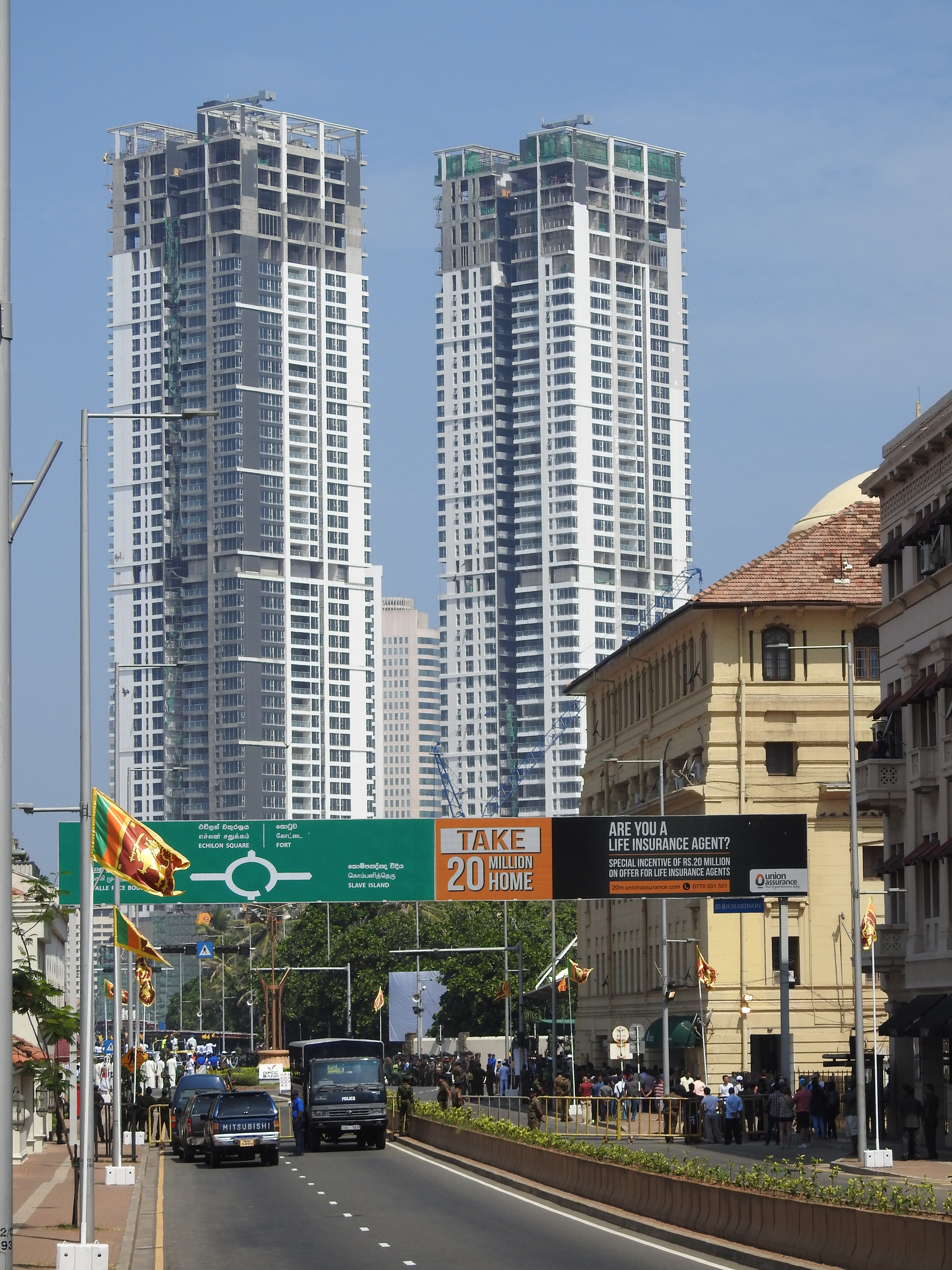
The residential component in February 2018
