= Keerthi Thennakoon =

Sri Lankan governor

Thennakoon Mudiyanselage Rajith Keerthi Thennakoon was the governor of the Uva, Southern and Central Provinces of Sri Lanka. He also served as Executive Director of the Campaign for Free and Fair Elections (CaFFE), a polls monitoring body.
