= 1996 in Sri Lanka =

- Decades: 1970s; 1980s; 1990s; 2000s; 2010s
- See also: Other events of 1996; Timeline of Sri Lankan history

The following lists events that happened during 1996 in Sri Lanka.

== Incumbents ==
- President: Chandrika Kumaratunga
- Prime Minister: Sirimavo Bandaranaike
- Chief Justice: G. P. S. de Silva

=== Governors ===
- Central Province – E. L. Senanayake
- North Central Province – Maithripala Senanayake
- North Eastern Province – Gamini Fonseka
- North Western Province – Hector Arawwawala
- Sabaragamuwa Province – C. N. Saliya Mathew
- Southern Province – Neville Kanakeratne
- Uva Province – Ananda Dassanayake
- Western Province – K. Vignarajah

=== Chief Ministers ===
- Central Province – W. M. P. B. Dissanayake
- North Central Province – G. D. Mahindasoma (until 2 May); Jayasena Dissanayake (starting 2 May)
- North Western Province – Nimal Bandara
- Sabaragamuwa Province – Jayatilake Podinilame
- Southern Province – Mahinda Yapa Abeywardena
- Uva Province – Percy Samaraweera
- Western Province – Susil Premajayanth

== Events ==
- Sri Lankan Civil War
  - Eelam War III
- 17 March – Sri Lanka wins the 1996 Cricket World Cup, beating Australia by 7 wickets, making this Sri Lanka's first ever World Cup victory.
- 18–25 July – The LTTE initiates Operation Unceasing Waves, following a series of losses in the Jaffna Peninsula. The LTTE launches an attack on Mullaitivu. The Sri Lankan Army is defeated with 1,242 army soldiers dead, and hundreds captured and executed. It has also been reported that others were found dead with their corpses clutching onto white flags.
- 24 July – A train is bombed in Dehiwala, killing 42 and wounding 400. The LTTE was claimed responsible for the attack, placing suitcase bombs in four carriages on a commuter train.

== Notes ==
a. Gunaratna, Rohan. (1998). Pg.353, Sri Lanka's Ethnic Crisis and National Security, Colombo: South Asian Network on Conflict Research. ISBN 955-8093-00-9
