= 1995 in Sri Lanka =

- Decades: 1970s; 1980s; 1990s; 2000s; 2010s
- See also: Other events of 1995; Timeline of Sri Lankan history

The following lists events that happened during 1995 in Sri Lanka.

== Incumbents ==
- President: Chandrika Kumaratunga
- Prime Minister: Sirimavo Bandaranaike
- Chief Justice: G. P. S. de Silva

=== Governors ===
- Central Province – E. L. Senanayake
- North Central Province – Maithripala Senanayake
- North Eastern Province – vacant (until 13 January); Gamini Fonseka (starting 13 January)
- North Western Province – Anandatissa de Alwis (until 12 January); Hector Arawwawala (starting 12 January)
- Sabaragamuwa Province – C. N. Saliya Mathew
- Southern Province – vacant (until 12 January); Neville Kanakeratne (starting 12 January)
- Uva Province – Ananda Dassanayake (starting January)
- Western Province – K. Vignarajah (starting January)

=== Chief Ministers ===
- Central Province – W. M. P. B. Dissanayake
- North Central Province – G. D. Mahindasoma
- North Western Province – Nimal Bandara
- Sabaragamuwa Province – Jayatilake Podinilame
- Southern Province – Mahinda Yapa Abeywardena
- Uva Province – Percy Samaraweera
- Western Province – Morris Rajapaksa (until 11 July); Susil Premajayanth (starting 13 July)

== Events ==
- Sri Lankan Civil War
  - Eelam War II
  - Eelam War III
- 25 May – Kallarawa massacre: The Liberation Tigers of Tamil Eelam perpetuate a massacre, killing 42 Sinhalese civilians after LTTE cadres stormed the area.
- 22 September – Nagerkovil school bombing: The Sri Lankan Air Force bombs the Nagar Kovil Maha Vidyalayam school in Jaffna, resulting in the deaths of roughly 34–71 Sri Lankan Tamil civilians based on multiple accounts.

== Notes ==
a. Gunaratna, Rohan. (1998). Pg.353, Sri Lanka's Ethnic Crisis and National Security, Colombo: South Asian Network on Conflict Research. ISBN 955-8093-00-9
