= Timeline of Sri Lankan history =

The location of Sri Lanka

The Timeline of Sri Lankan history outlines the major political, territorial, socio-economic, and cultural developments of Sri Lanka and its predecessor states from prehistory through to the modern era. Spanning over five hundred thousand years, the chronological record documents the island's evolution from early human settlement and protohistoric Iron Age societies through to the arrival of Indo-Aryan migrants and the establishment of the first organised state in the 6th century BCE through to the present day.

== Prehistoric Sri Lanka ==
Year	Event
ca. 500,000–300,000 BP	First human settlements in Sri Lanka.
ca. 300,000 BP	Possible earliest occurrence of archaeological deposits dating back to the Middle Pleistocene.
ca. 125,000 BP	Evidence of a flake industry characterized by unretouched small tools.
ca. 125,000–75,000 BP	Occurrence of Pleistocene altithermals leading to increased atmospheric circulation and seasonality of precipitation.
ca. 74,000 BP	Earliest radiometric dating of archaeological deposits in Sri Lanka.
ca. 50,000–30,000 BCE	Prehistoric Period: primitive food-gathering.
ca. 30,000–1,000 BCE	Mesolithic Period: food-gathering.
ca. 28,500 BP	Artefacts layer recorded at Batadombalena site (7c).
ca. 28,000 BP	Appearance of geometric microlithic stone tool assemblages (up to possibly ca. 2,500 BP).
ca. 28,000 BP	Earliest evidence of anatomically modern man in South Asia from human remains.
ca. 28,000 BP	Start of relative homogeneity in Wet Zone environmental and cultural sub-systems.
ca. 22,000 BP	Artefacts layer recorded at Batadombalena site (7b).
ca. 16,700 BP	Artefacts layer recorded at Batadombalena site (7a).
ca. 16,000 BP	Human skeletal material displaying morphological continuity.
ca. 14,300–16,000 BP	Artefacts layer recorded at Batadombalena site (6).
ca. 13,500 BP	Artefacts layer recorded at Batadombalena site (5).
ca. 12,500 BP	Human skeletal material displaying morphological continuity.
ca. 11,500–13,000 BP	Artefacts layer recorded at Batadombalena site (4).
ca. 10,000 BCE	Austronesian migrations to Sri Lanka; production of microliths from heat-shattered quartz and evidence of urn burials.
ca. 6,500 BP	Human skeletal material displaying morphological continuity.

== Iron Age (~1000 BCE–500 BCE) ==
=== 11th century BCE ===
Year	Event
c. 1,000–300 BCE	Protohistoric Period: beginnings of agriculture and iron technology.

=== 10th century BCE ===
Year	Event
900 BCE	Archaeological evidence for the beginnings of the Iron Age in Sri Lanka is found at Anuradhapura, where a large city–settlement was founded before 900 BCE. The settlement was about 15 hectares in 900 BCE, but by 700 BC it had expanded to 50 hectares. A similar site from the same period has also been discovered near Aligala in Sigiriya.

=== 7th century BCE ===
Year	Event
600–500 BCE	Early Brahmi inscriptions and non-Brahmi symbols recorded from site contexts AMP-88(75) and ASW-88(88)

== Tambapanni period ==
=== 6th century BCE ===
Year	Date	Event
ca. 500 BCE		Transition between the protohistoric Iron Age and the Lower Early Historic period, as instanced in context 17. Rim type 8 in necked vessels and roof-tile type 35a make their first appearance. This episode is inadequately defined and could have commenced as early as the 8th century BC, as per the evidence from the calibrated age range.
ca. 500 BCE		Commencement of progressive spread of Sinhalese and Tamil speaking peoples equipped with iron technology and agricultural subsistence systems.
~543 BCE		Vijaya, prince regent of Sinhabahu, the King of Vanga and Queen Sinhasivali, is exiled along with his 700 followers, from Sinhapura after he and his band of followers became notorious for their violent deeds. The wives and children of these 700 men were also sent on separate ships.
543 BCE (Note: or 483 BCE)		Prince Vijaya had his followers landed at a place called Supparaka; the women landed at a place called Mahiladipaka, and the children landed at a place called Naggadipa. Vijaya's ship later reached Sri Lanka, on the North west coast of present-day Puttalam, on the day of the Parinibbaana of The Buddha.
543 BCE		The Kingdom of Tambapanni is established.
543–505 BCE		During the reign of Vijaya, in addition to Tambapaṇṇī, the King and his ministers founded settlements like Anuraadhagaama, Upatissagāma, Ujjeni, Uruvelaa and Vijithapura located along the river banks of the Malwathu Oya and the Kala Oya in the northwestern region of Sri Lanka.
505 BCE		Prince Vijaya dies without a legitimate successor after a reign of 38 years. Upatissa, chief minister of Vijaya, becomes regent while a successor is brought over from Sinhapura.
504 BCE		The nephew of Prince Vijaya, Panduvasdeva, succeeds him to the throne. He arrives one year after the death of Vijaya and brings with him 32 sons of ministers.

=== 5th century BCE ===
Year	Date	Event
474 BCE		Death of Panduvasdeva after a reign of 30 years. Abhaya, eldest son of Panduvasdeva, ascends the throne.
~454 BCE		Prince Pandukabhaya, nephew of Abhaya, rebels and goes to war with his uncles. Abhaya, upon losing the battle sent a letter to the prince in secret conferring on him the rule of the country south of the river, sharing sovereignty of Sri Lanka. Hearing of this plan angered Abhaya's brothers, Pandukabhaya's uncles, compelled Abhaya to abdicate and elected Prince Tissa, the next in line, as regent.
454 BCE		Deposition of Abhaya after a reign of 20 years; Prince Tissa, younger brother of Abhaya, becomes regent.
454–437 BCE		Prince Tissa was not acknowledged universally as the Sinhalese king, remained as regent during the Nineteen Years' War (458–439 BC), which ended with the Battle of Labugamaka where with the aid of the Yakkhas and others, Pandukabhaya slew eight of his uncles who were against him.
437 BCE		Pandukabhaya, nephew of Abhaya and Tissa, takes the capital Upatissagāma and is crowned the new Sinhalese king.

== Anuradhapura period ==
=== 5th century BCE ===
Year	Date	Event
438 BC		Pandukabhaya proceeded to Anuraadhagaama where he builds it as the new capital of Sri Lanka, renaming it Anuradhapura. (Note: After one of Vijaya's ministers and Pandukabhaya's own great-uncle who both resided there and where both named Anuradha.)
400 BC		Abhaya Wewa built

=== 4th century BCE ===
Year	Date	Event
367 BCE		Death of Pandukabhaya after a reign of 70 years. Mutasiva, son of Pandukabhaya, ascends the throne.
375 BCE	28 February	Total solar eclipse visible over northern Sri Lanka (Jaffna Peninsula).
353 BCE	24 June	Total solar eclipse visible over southeastern Sri Lanka.
335 BCE	4 July	Total solar eclipse visible across almost the entirety of Sri Lanka.
307 BCE		Death of Mutasiva after a reign of 60 years. Devanampiya Tissa, second son of Mutasiva, ascends the throne.
~300 BCE		Greek historian Megasthenes mentions Sri Lanka (Taprobane) in his writings.

=== 3rd century BCE ===
Year	Date	Event
250 BCE		Theravada Buddhism is officially introduced to Sri Lanka by the Mahinda Thero, son of Ashoka, during the reign of Devanampiya Tissa.
250 BCE		Sanghamitta Theri, daughter of Emperor Ashoka, sister of Mahinda, arrives in Sri Lanka from India to establish the Bhikkhuni Sangha, bringing a sapling of the Sacred Bodhi Tree, which was planted in the Mahamevnāwa Uyana at Anuradhapura.
		The Thuparamaya, the first Buddhist temple in Sri Lanka, was constructed after the arrival of Mahinda Thero.
267 BCE		Death of Devanampiya Tissa after a reign of 40 years. Uttiya, younger brother of Devanampiya Tissa, ascends the throne.
255 BCE		Mahinda Thero passes away at the age of 80 in the eighth year of the reign of Uttiya.
256 BCE		Sanghamitta Therii passes away at the age of 79 in the ninth year of the reign of Uttiya.
257 BCE		Death of Uttiya after a reign of 10 years. Mahasiva, younger brother of Uttiya, ascends the throne.
247 BCE		Death of Mahasiva after a reign of 10 years. Suratissa, younger brother of Mahasiva, ascends the throne.
237 BCE		Suratissa is slain in battle after a reign of 10 years; South Indian invaders Sena and Guttika usurp the throne.
215 BCE		Asela, son of Mutasiva, overthrows Sena and Guttika in battle after a reign of 22 years reclaiming the throne.
205 BCE		Asela is slain in battle after a reign of 10 years; Elara, a Tamil prince from South India invades and ursurpes the throne.

=== 2nd century BCE ===
Year	Date	Event
161 BCE		Dutugamunu, a descendant of Mahanaga, Prince of Ruhuna brother of Asela, defeats and kills Elara at the Battle of Vijithapura and restores Sinhalese sovereignty after a reign of 44 years.
140 BC		The Ruwanwelisaya (or Maha Thupa), the most celebrated stupa in Sri Lanka, is built by Dutugamunu and sends a monk to India to fetch relics to be enshrined in it.
		The Mirisawetiya Vihara stupa is built by Dutugamunu in Anuradhapura.
133 BCE	1 June	Total solar eclipse visible across Sri Lanka except the far northern region, during the reign of King Dutugamunu.
137 BCE		Death of Dutugemunu after a reign of 24 years. Saddha Tissa, younger brother of Dutugemunu, ascends the throne.
119 BCE		Saddha Tissa dies and is succeeded by his younger son Thulatthana, whose ascension was endorsed and supported as a result of the decision made by royal advisors and Buddhist monks.
119 BCE		Death of Saddha Tissa after a reign of 18 years. Thulatthana, second son of Saddha Tissa, ascends the throne, but is deposed and killed after a reign of 1 month and 10 days; Lanjatissa, elder brother of Thulatthana, ascends the throne.
119 BCE		One month and ten days after his ascension, Lanja Tissa usurps his younger brother Thulatthana and takes the throne upon hear of his succession.
109 BCE		Death of Lanjatissa after a reign of 9 years and 15 days. Khallata Naga, younger brother of Lanjatissa, ascends the throne.
103 BCE		Khallata Naga is assassinated by his own commander-in-chief, Kammaharattaka. However, Kammaharattaka's rule last only a day and is killed by Prince Vattagamini, the youngest brother of Khallata Naga. Prince Vattagamini ascends the throne as Valagamba.
103 BCE		Only five months into his regin Valagamba faced internal threats from a Brahman named Tiya (or Tissa) from Ruhuna, South Lanka and external threats from Tamil forces from South India. The Tamil army vanquished Tiya and defeated Valagamba in battle forcing him to flee into exile for fourteen years. Pulahatha, the first of the The Five Dravidians seized and ruled the Sinhalese throne.
103 BCE–89 BCE		The fourteen years of rule of The Five Dravidians was disastrous for the country and its institutions. The Beminitiya Seya, an unprecedented famine during that period caused the rapid decline of Buddhism in the country with many thousands of monks and laymen dying of starvation.
100 BCE		Pulahatha is slain after a reign of 3 years; Bahiya ascends the throne.

=== 1st century BCE ===
Year	Date	Event
98 BCE		Bahiya is slain after a reign of 2 years; Panaya Mara ascends the throne.
91 BCE		Panaya Mara is slain after a reign of 7 years; Pilaya Mara ascends the throne.
90 BCE		Pilaya Mara is slain after a reign of 7 months; Dathika ascends the throne.
89 BCE		After building and army during his 14 years in exile Valagamba launches a successful attack on Dathika, the last of the Five Dravidians defeating him and taking back control of the country.
89 BCE		Vattagāmanī Abhaya founds the Abhayagiri Vihāra.
		According to the Sinhalese chronicles, the content of the Pali Canon is written down in the reign of Valagamba (29–17 BCE)
		During the reign of Valagamba, after the experience of the Beminitiya Seya, the Tipitaka and its commentaries were committed to writing for the first time on palm leaves at the Aluvihare Rock Temple.
		During the reign of Valagamba, the first schism of the Buddhist Sangha occurred with the establishment of the Abhayagiri Vihāra, which broke away from the orthodox Anuradhapura Maha Viharaya.
77 BCE		Death of Valagamba after a second reign of 12 years. Mahakuli Mahatissa, nephew and adopted son of Valagamba (son of Khallata Naga), ascends the throne.
63 BCE		Death of Mahakuli Mahatissa after a reign of 14 years. Chora Naga, son of Valagamba, ascends the throne.
51 BCE		Chora Naga is poisoned after a reign of 12 years. Kuda Tissa, son of Mahakuli Mahatissa, ascends the throne.
47 BCE		Kuda Tissa is poisoned by Queen Anula after a reign of 3 years; Anula, widow of Chora Naga and Kuda Tissa, rules as queen regnant.
42 BCE		Anula is executed after a reign of 5 years; Kutakanna Tissa, second son of Mahakuli Mahatissa, ascends the throne.
20 BCE		Death of Kutakanna Tissa after a reign of 22 years. Bhatika Abhaya, son of Kutakanna Tissa, ascends the throne.

=== 1st century ===
Year	Date	Event
9 CE		Death of Bhatika Abhaya after a reign of 28 years. Mahadathika Mahanaga, younger brother of Bhatikabhaya Tissa, ascends the throne.
21		Death of Mahadathika Mahanaga after a reign of 12 years. Amandagamani Abhaya, son of Mahadathika Mahanaga, ascends the throne.
30		Amandagamani Abhaya is assassinated after a reign of 9 years and 8 months; Kanirajanu Tissa, younger brother of Amandagamani Abhaya, ascends the throne.
33		Death of Kaniraja Tissa after a reign of 3 years. Chulabhaya, son of Amandagamani Abhaya, ascends the throne.
35		Death of Chulabhaya after a reign of 1 year. Sivali, sister of Chulabhaya, rules as queen regnant, but is deposed after 4 months; Ilanaga, nephew of Chulabhaya and Sivali, ascends the throne.
41–54		Annius Plocamus, a Roman tax collector, visits Sri Lanka during the reign of Claudius.
44		Death of Ilanaga after a reign of 9 years. Chandamukha, son of Ilanaga, ascends the throne.
45		Envoys from Sri Lanka visit Rome during the reign of Emperor Claudius.
52		Chandamukha is killed after a reign of 8 years and 8 months; Yassalalaka Tissa, younger brother of Chandamukha Siva, ascends the throne.
60		Yassalalaka Tissa is slain after a reign of 7 years and 8 months; Subharaja (Subha), royal gatekeeper, usurps the throne.
66		Subharaja is slain after a reign of 6 years; Vasabha, member of the Lambakanna clan, ascends the throne, founding the First Lambakanna Dynasty.

=== 2nd century ===
Year	Date	Event
110		Death of Vasabha after a reign of 44 years. Vankanasika Tissa, son of Vasabha, ascends the throne.
113		Death of Vankanasika Tissa after a reign of 3 years.
114		Gajabahu I, son of Vankanasika Tissa, ascends the throne.
136		Death of Gajabahu I after a reign of 22 years. Mahallaka Naga, father-in-law of Gajabahu I, ascends the throne.
142		Death of Mahallaka Naga after a reign of 6 years. Bhatika Tissa, son of Mahallaka Naga, ascends the throne.
150–250		Construction of monumental architecture.
166		Death of Bhatika Tissa after a reign of 24 years. Kanittha Tissa, younger brother of Bhatika Tissa, ascends the throne.
184		Death of Kanittha Tissa after a reign of 18 years. Khujjanaga, son of Kanittha Tissa, ascends the throne.
186		Khujjanaga is murdered after a reign of 2 years; Kunchanaga, younger brother of Khujjanaga, ascends the throne.
187		Kunchanaga is deposed after a reign of 1 year; Siri Naga I, brother-in-law of Kunchanaga, ascends the throne.

=== 3rd century ===
Year	Date	Event
206		Death of Siri Naga I after a reign of 19 years. Voharika Tissa, son of Siri Naga I, ascends the throne.
228		Voharika Tissa is overthrown and killed after a reign of 22 years; Abhaya Naga, younger brother of Voharika Tissa, ascends the throne.
236		Death of Abhaya Naga after a reign of 8 years. Siri Naga II, nephew of Abhaya Naga (son of Voharika Tissa), ascends the throne.
238		Death of Siri Naga II after a reign of 2 years. Vijaya Kumara, son of Sirinaga II, ascends the throne.
239		Vijaya Kumara is slain after a reign of 1 year; Sangha Tissa I, noble of the Lambakanna clan, ascends the throne.
243		Sangha Tissa I is poisoned after a reign of 4 years; Siri Sangha Bodhi I, noble of the Lambakanna clan, ascends the throne.
247		Siri Sangha Bodhi I abdicates after a reign of 4 years; Gothabhaya, chief minister and Lambakanna noble, ascends the throne.
260		Death of Gothabhaya after a reign of 13 years. Jettha Tissa I, elder son of Gothabhaya, ascends the throne.
274		Death of Jettha Tissa I after a reign of 14 years. Mahasena, younger brother of Jettha Tissa I, ascends the throne.

=== 4th century ===
Year	Date	Event
301		Death of Mahasena after a reign of 27 years. Sirimeghavanna, son of Mahasena, ascends the throne.
311		Princess Hemamala and Prince Dantha bring the Sacred Relic of the tooth of the Buddha from Kalinga to Sri Lanka during the reign of Sirimeghavanna.
327	6 June	Total solar eclipse visible over southeastern Sri Lanka during the Anuradhapura period.
328		Death of Sirimeghavanna after a reign of 27 years. Jettha Tissa II, younger brother of Sirimeghavanna, ascends the throne.
337		Death of Jettha Tissa II after a reign of 9 years. Buddhadasa, son of Jettha Tissa II, ascends the throne.
365		Death of Buddhadasa after a reign of 28 years. Upatissa I, eldest son of Buddhadasa, ascends the throne.

=== 5th century ===
Year	Date	Event
5th Century		Composition of Mahāvamsa.
406		Upatissa I is murdered after a reign of 41 years; Mahanama, younger brother of Upatissa I, ascends the throne.
410–412		Faxian, a Chinese Buddhist monk and traveller, visits Sri Lanka and stays for two years studying Buddhist texts.
425–450		During the reign of Mahanama, Buddhaghosa Thera arrived from India to compile the Pali Commentaries (Atthakathaa) and compose the Visuddhimagga at the Mahaavihaara.
425		Dhammapala composes commentaries on remaining portions of the Canon (such as the Udana, Itivuttaka, Theragatha, and Therigatha) along with extensive sub-commentaries.
428		Death of Mahanama after a reign of 22 years. Soththisena, son of Mahanama, ascends the throne and dies after a reign of 1 day; Chattagahaka Jantu, husband of Mahanama's daughter, ascends the throne.
429		Death of Chattagahaka Jantu after a reign of 1 year. Mittasena, an outsider of unknown royal lineage, ascends the throne and is slain after a reign of 1 year by Pandyan invaders; Pandu captures the throne.
429		Bhikkhuni Devasara leads a delegation of Sri Lankan nuns to China, carrying a sapling of the Bodhi tree to help establish the Bhikkhuni ordination line.
433		A second delegation of Sri Lankan bhikkhunis arrives at Nanlin Temple in Nanjing, performing the first dual ordination for over 300 Chinese nuns.
434		Death of Pandu after a reign of 5 years; Parinda, son of Pandu, ascends the throne.
437		Death of Parinda after a reign of 3 years; Khudda Parinda, younger brother of Parinda, ascends the throne.
453		Death of Khudda Parinda after a reign of 16 years; Tiritara ascends the throne and is slain after 2 months; Dathiya ascends the throne.
456		Dathiya is slain after a reign of 3 years; Pithiya ascends the throne and is slain after 7 months; Dhatusena, member of the Moriya clan, ascends the throne (Moriya Dynasty).
459–477		Dhatusena repels Tamil invaders from South India but is later killed by his son Kassapa I.
473		Dhatusena is murdered after a reign of 17 years; Kashyapa I, non-royal son of Dhatusena, usurps the throne and moves the capital to Sigiriya.
477–495		Kassapa I establishes his capital and fortress complex at Sigiriya.
495		Kashyapa I commits suicide in battle after a reign of 22 years; Moggallana I, royal son of Dhatusena and half-brother of Kashyapa I, ascends the throne.
497–515		The Sacred Hair Relic of the Buddha was brought to Sri Lanka during the reign of Moggallana I.

=== 6th century ===
Year	Date	Event
512		Death of Moggallana I after a reign of 17 years. Kumara Dhatusena, son of Moggallana I, ascends the throne.
520		Death of Kumara Dhatusena after a reign of 8 years. Kittisena, son of Kumara Dhatusena, ascends the throne.
521		Kittisena is murdered after a reign of 9 months; Siva II, maternal uncle of Kittisena, ascends the throne and is slain after 25 days; Upatissa II, brother-in-law of Kumara Dhatusena, ascends the throne.
522		Upatissa II is slain after a reign of 1 year and 6 months; Silakala Ambasamanera, distant relative of the Moriya clan, ascends the throne.
~522		Alexandrian Greek merchant Cosmas Indicopleustes visits Sri Lanka and documents its importance as a center of Indian Ocean trade.
535		Death of Silakala Ambasamanera after a reign of 13 years. Dathappabhuti, second son of Silakala Ambasamanera, ascends the throne and is slain after 6 months; Jettha Tissa III (Dathaprabhati), younger brother of Dathappabhuti, ascends the throne and is slain after 5 months; Moggallana II, eldest brother of Rathathiyana and Jettha Tissa III, ascends the throne.
555		Death of Moggallana II after a reign of 20 years. Kittisiri Meghavanna, son of Moggallana II, ascends the throne and is slain after 19 days; Maha Naga, prime minister under Silakala Ambasamanera, ascends the throne.
560		Death of Maha Naga after a reign of 5 years. Aggabodhi I, maternal nephew and adopted son of Maha Naga, ascends the throne.

=== 7th century ===
Year	Date	Event
604		Death of Aggabodhi I after a reign of 44 years. Aggabodhi II, nephew and son-in-law of Aggabodhi I, ascends the throne.
614		Death of Aggabodhi II after a reign of 10 years. Sangha Tissa II, brother and sword-bearer of Aggabodhi II, ascends the throne and is slain after 2 months; Moggallana III, general under Aggabodhi II, ascends the throne.
619		Moggallana III is slain after a reign of 5 years; Silameghavanna, general under Moggallana III, ascends the throne.
628		Death of Silameghavanna after a reign of 9 years. Aggabodhi III, son of Silameghavanna, ascends the throne, but is deposed after a first reign of 6 months; Jettha Tissa III, son of Sangha Tissa II, ascends the throne.
629		Jettha Tissa III commits suicide in battle after a reign of 5 months; Aggabodhi III regains the throne.
639		Death of Aggabodhi III after a second reign of 10 years. Dathopa Tissa I, general under Jettha Tissa III, ascends the throne.
650		Death of Dathopa Tissa I after a reign of 11 years. Kassapa II, younger brother of Aggabodhi III, ascends the throne.
653	1 June	Total solar eclipse visible over southern Sri Lanka.
659		Death of Kassapa II after a reign of 9 years. Dappula I, nephew of Silameghavanna and son-in-law of Kassapa II, ascends the throne.
662		Deposition of Dappula I after a reign of 3 years; Dathopa Tissa II, nephew of Dathopa Tissa I, ascends the throne.
671		Death of Dathopa Tissa II after a reign of 9 years. Aggabodhi IV, younger brother of Dathopa Tissa II, ascends the throne.
687		Death of Aggabodhi IV after a reign of 16 years. Unhanagara Hatthadatha, royal prince of Unhanagara lineage, ascends the throne and is slain after 6 months; Manavanna, son of Kassapa II, ascends the throne, founding the Second Lambakanna Dynasty.

=== 8th century ===
Year	Date	Event
720		Indian Esoteric Buddhist master Vajrabodhi visits Sri Lanka on his journey to China.
722		Death of Manavanna after a reign of 35 years. Aggabodhi V, eldest son of Manavanna, ascends the throne.
728		Death of Aggabodhi V after a reign of 6 years. Kassapa III, younger brother of Aggabodhi V, ascends the throne.
735		Death of Kassapa III after a reign of 7 years. Mahinda I, youngest brother of Aggabodhi V and Kassapa III, rules as regent.
738		Death of Mahinda I after a regency of 3 years. Aggabodhi VI, son of Kassapa III, ascends the throne.
741		Amoghavajra, a disciple of Vajrabodhi, visits Sri Lanka to collect esoteric Buddhist scriptures.
769		Polonnaruva becomes temporary capital.
778		Death of Aggabodhi VI after a reign of 40 years. Aggabodhi VII, son of Mahinda I, ascends the throne.
789		Death of Aggabodhi VII after a reign of 11 years. Mahinda II, son of Aggabodhi VI, ascends the throne.
794		Death of Mahinda II after a reign of 5 years. Dappula II, son of Mahinda II, ascends the throne.
799		Death of Dappula II after a reign of 5 years. Mahinda III, son of Dappula II, ascends the throne.

=== 9th century ===
Year	Date	Event
804		Death of Mahinda III after a reign of 5 years. Aggabodhi VIII, younger brother of Mahinda III, ascends the throne.
815		Death of Aggabodhi VIII after a reign of 11 years. Dappula III, younger brother of Aggabodhi VIII, ascends the throne.
831		Death of Dappula III after a reign of 16 years. Aggabodhi IX, son of Dappula II and cousin of Dappula III, ascends the throne.
834		Death of Aggabodhi IX after a reign of 3 years. Sena I, younger brother of Aggabodhi IX, ascends the throne.
834	7 September	Total solar eclipse visible over southern Sri Lanka.
840		Srimara Srivallabha invades the Anuradhapura kingdom and captures the northern provinces from Sena I.
850		Persian Muslim traveler Sulaiman al-Tajir visits Sri Lanka and writes accounts of its trade and gems.
853		Sena II starts construction on the Mihintale Hospital Complex, considered one of the oldest hospital ruins in the world and the oldest existing hospital ruins in Sri Lanka.
854		Death of Sena I after a reign of 20 years. Sena II, nephew of Sena I (son of Kassapa), ascends the throne.
862		Sinhalese forces led by Sena II invade the Pandyan kingdom and sack Madurai. Srimara is killed in battle.
866	16 June	Total solar eclipse visible over northern Sri Lanka (Jaffna Peninsula) during the reign of King Sena II.
887		Lankan expedition sacks Madurai.
889		Death of Sena II after a reign of 35 years. Udaya I, younger brother of Sena II, ascends the throne.
898		Death of Udaya I after a reign of 9 years. Kassapa IV, younger brother of Sena II and Udaya I, ascends the throne.

=== 10th century ===
Year	Date	Event
900		Persian scholar Abu Zayd al-Sirafi compiles accounts of Sri Lanka based on maritime trade networks.
915		Death of Kassapa IV after a reign of 17 years. Kassapa V, son of Sena II and nephew of Kassapa IV, ascends the throne.
925		Death of Kassapa V after a reign of 10 years. Dappula IV, son of Kassapa IV, ascends the throne, dies after a reign of 7 months, and Dappula V, younger brother of Dappula IV, ascends the throne.
937		Death of Dappula V after a reign of 12 years. Udaya II, cousin of Dappula V (son of Udaya I), ascends the throne.
940		Death of Udaya II after a reign of 3 years. Sena III, brother of Udaya II, ascends the throne.
943		Death of Sena III after a reign of 3 years. Udaya III, cousin of Sena III (son of Kassapa IV), ascends the throne.
946		Death of Udaya III after a reign of 3 years. Sena IV, son of Kassapa V, ascends the throne.
947		Coļas invade Sri Lanka.
953		Death of Sena IV after a reign of 7 years. Mahinda IV, younger brother of Sena IV, ascends the throne.
953	6 April	Total solar eclipse visible over the northern tip of Sri Lanka.
970		Arab historian and traveler Al-Masudi visits Sri Lanka.
975		Death of Mahinda IV after a reign of 22 years. Sena V, eldest son of Mahinda IV, ascends the throne.
977	13 December	Total solar eclipse visible over the southern tip of Sri Lanka during the reign of Sena V.
987		Death of Sena V after a reign of 12 years. Mahinda V, younger brother of Sena V, ascends the throne.
993		Coļas invade Sri Lanka.

=== 11th century ===
Year	Date	Event
1014–1017		Chola conquest and occupation of Anuradhapura: The Cholas under Rajendra I attack and conquer parts of the Anuradhapura kingdom.
1014–1017		Mahinda V is captured, along with the crown, queen, daughter, and wealth by Chola invaders after ruling for 30 years; Chola Annexation begins.
1014–1017		The Sangha, and especially in Sri Lanka, the Bhikkhuni (Buddhist nuns) Order dies out due to invasions. The bhikkhu line in Sri Lanka is later revived with bhikkhus from Burma.
1029		Chola conquest and occupation of Anuradhapura: Death of Mahinda V in captivity in India after 42 nominal years of reign. Kassapa VI (Vikramabahu), son of Mahinda V, leads southern resistance in Ruhuna.
1040		Death of Kassapa VI after a reign of 11 years. Kirti, general under Kassapa VI, reigns in Ruhuna and is slain after 7 days; Mahalana Kitti, noble of Ruhuna, ascends the throne.
1043		Death of Mahalana Kitti after a reign of 3 years; Vikrama Pandya, Pandyan prince living in Ruhuna, reigns.
1046		Death of Vikrama Pandya after a reign of 3 years; Jagathpala, prince of Ayodhya, reigns in Ruhuna.
1049		A Sinhalese chieftain named Lokeshwara, temporarily defeats the Chola forces and establishes a military base in Ruhuna.
1050		The bhikkhu and bhikkhuni monastic communities at Anuradhapura die out following invasions from South India.
1052		Death of Jagathpala after a reign of 6 years; Parakrama Pandya, Pandyan prince, reigns in Ruhuna.
1054		Death of Parakrama Pandya after a reign of 2 years; Loka, prime minister of Ruhuna, reigns.
1054		Keshadhatu Kasyapa, a pretender to the Sinhalese throne, establishes a dominion in Eastern Ruhuna after driving away Chola forces, which would last until 1055.

== Polonnaruwa period ==
=== 11th century ===
Year	Date	Event
1055		Death of Loka after a reign of 1 year; Vijayabahu I, royal prince of the Lambakanna lineage, ascends the throne in Ruhuna, expels the Chola Empire, and unifies Sri Lanka at Polonnaruwa.
1070		Prince Kitti, who was given the title Vijayabahu, launches a seventeen-year campaign and successfully drives out the Cholas from Sri Lanka.
1070		Vijayabahu is crowned as the first king of Polonnaruwa.
1070		Vijayabahu I invites bhikkhus from Pagan (Burma) to Polonnaruwa to reinstate the Theravada ordination line in Sri Lanka.
1070		Vijayabāhu I expels Colas from the island.
1073		Construction of the stone Buddha sculptures at Gal Vihara following the expulsion of Chola forces from Polonnaruwa.
1084		Velakkara Revolt: Tamil mercenaries named Velakkaras, mutiny against king Vijayabahu as he declared war with the Chola Empire due to arresting a group of Sinhalese ambassadors sent to Western Chalukya.
1084–1112		In Myanmar, during the reign of Kyansittha, completes the building of the Shwezigon Pagoda, a shrine for relics of the Buddha, including a tooth brought from Sri Lanka. Various inscriptions refer to him as an incarnation of Vishnu, a chakravartin, a bodhisattva, and dharmaraja.

=== 12th century ===
Year	Date	Event
1110		Death of Vijayabahu I after a reign of 55 years, and the instalment of Jayabahu I as his successor without passing the throne to Vijayabahu son Vikramabahu I causes a power struggle between the two rulers.
1111		Deposition of Jayabahu I after a reign of 1 year; Vikramabahu I, son of Vijayabahu I, ascends the throne.
1132		Death of Vikramabahu I after a reign of 21 years. Gajabahu II, son of Vikramabahu I, ascends the throne.
1153		Death of Gajabahu II after a reign of 21 years; Parakramabahu I (Parakramabahu the Great), cousin of Gajabahu II (grandson of Vijayabahu I), ascends the throne.
1157		A revolt led-by Queen Sugala of Ruhuna against the Parakramabahu I. The rebellion was suppressed by the army and the kingdom of Ruhuna was annexed as a part of Polonnaruwa in 1158.
1160		Ruhuna Rebellion
1164		With the guidance of two forest monks – Ven. Mahākassapa Thera and Ven. Sāriputta Thera, Parakramabahu I reunites all bhikkhus in Sri Lanka into the Mahavihara sect.
1165		Parakramabahu I unified the three Nikaayas (Mahaavihaara, Abhayagiri, and Jetavana) and purified the Sangha.
1168		Rajarata Rebellion
1171		Anawrahta of Pagan upon request of Vijayabahu I sends monks and scriptures to restart Buddhism in the Sri Lanka.
1186		Death of Parakramabahu I after a reign of 33 years. Vijayabahu II, nephew of Parakramabahu I, ascends the throne.
1187		Vijayabahu II is murdered after a reign of 1 year; Mahinda VI, Kalinga noble, usurps the throne, is slain after 5 days, and Nissanka Malla, prince of Kalinga lineage, ascends the throne.
1190		Sithu II of Pagan realigns Burmese Buddhism with the Mahavihara school of Sri Lanka.
1196		Death of Nissanka Malla after a reign of 9 years. Virabahu I, son of Nissanka Malla, ascends the throne, is slain after 1 night, Vikramabahu II, younger brother of Nissanka Malla, ascends the throne, is slain after 3 months, and Chodaganga, nephew of Nissanka Malla, ascends the throne.
1197		Chodaganga is deposed after a reign of 9 months; Lilavati, widow of Parakramabahu I, ascends the throne for her first reign.

=== 13th century ===
Year	Date	Event
1200		Lilavati is deposed after a first reign of 3 years; Sahassa Malla, half-brother of Nissanka Malla, ascends the throne.
1202		Sahassa Malla is deposed after a reign of 2 years; Kalyanavati, widow of Nissanka Malla, rules as queen regnant.
1208		Deposition of Kalyanavati after a reign of 6 years; Dharmasoka, infant relative of Nissanka Malla, ascends the throne.
1209		Death of Dharmasoka after a reign of 1 year; Anikanga, father of Dharmasoka, ascends the throne, is slain after 17 days, and Lilavati ascends the throne for her second reign.
1210		Lilavati is deposed after a second reign of 1 year; Lokissara, Tamil general, usurps the throne.
1211		Lokissara is overthrown after a reign of 9 months; Lilavati ascends the throne for her third reign.
1212		Lilavati is deposed after a third reign of 7 months; Parakrama Pandyan II, Pandyan prince, ascends the throne.
1215		Parakrama Pandyan II is deposed after a reign of 3 years during the invasion of Kalinga Magha, prince of Kalinga, devastating Polonnaruwa leading to the fall of the Polonnaruwa kingdom resulting in the widespread destruction of monasteries and libraries.
1220		Vijayabahu III, prince of the Siri Sangabo lineage, establishes the Kingdom of Dambadeniya.
1236		Death of Vijayabahu III after a reign of 16 years. Parakramabahu II, eldest son of Vijayabahu III, ascends the throne at Dambadeniya.
1236		The Jaffna kingdom is established.
1236		Bhikkhus from Kanchipuram, India, arrive in Sri Lanka to revive the Theravada ordination line.
1236–1270		During his regin Parakramabahu II restored the Śāsana and oversaw a significant literary revival.
1247		Chandrabhanu invades from Malay Peninsula.
1257		Thai monks traveled to Sri Lanka to ordain in the Sinhalese Mahavihara Theravada sect (known as Lankavamsa/Lankavong in Thailand) lineage and to study the teachings. Sinhalese monks also traveled to Thailand to teach Theravada Buddhism.
1270		Death of Parakramabahu II after a reign of 34 years. Vijayabahu IV, eldest son of Parakramabahu II, ascends the throne.
1272		Vijayabahu IV is assassinated after a reign of 2 years; Bhuvanekabahu I, younger brother of Vijayabahu IV, ascends the throne and moves the capital to Yapahuwa.
1279		Final inscriptional evidence recorded for a Theravada Bhikkhuni nunnery (located in Burma).
1284		Death of Bhuvanekabahu I after a reign of 12 years.
1284		Aryacakravartis rules Jaffna Kingdom as vassal of Pandyas.
1287		Parakramabahu III, son of Vijayabahu IV and nephew of Bhuvanekabahu I, ascends the throne.
1292		Venetian traveler Marco Polo visits Sri Lanka during his return voyage from China to Venice.
1293	5 July	Total solar eclipse visible across almost the entire island.
1293		Death of Parakramabahu III after a reign of 6 years. Bhuvanekabahu II, son of Bhuvanekabahu I and cousin of Parakramabahu III, ascends the throne at Kurunegala.
13th century		A forest-based Sri Lankan ordination line spreads to Burma and Thailand, facilitating the broader expansion of Theravada Buddhism into Laos and Cambodia.

== Transitional period ==
=== 14th century ===
Year	Date	Event
1302		Death of Bhuvanekabahu II after a reign of 9 years. Parakramabahu IV, son of Bhuvanekabahu II, ascends the throne.
1322		Franciscan friar Odoric of Pordenone stops in Sri Lanka on his pilgrimage to the East.
1324		French Dominican missionary Jordan Catala visits Sri Lanka on his journey to India.
1326		Death of Parakramabahu IV after a reign of 24 years. Bhuvanekabahu III, noble of the Siri Sangabo lineage, ascends the throne.
1335		Death of Bhuvanekabahu III after a reign of 9 years. Vijayabahu V, nephew of Parakramabahu IV, ascends the throne.
1341		Death of Vijayabahu V after a reign of 6 years. Bhuvanekabahu IV, son of Vijayabahu V, ascends the throne at Gampola.
1344		Moroccan explorer Ibn Battuta arrives in Sri Lanka to make a pilgrimage to Sri Pada.
1348		Papal envoy Giovanni de' Marignolli spends four months in Sri Lanka en route from China.
1351		Death of Bhuvanekabahu IV after a reign of 10 years. Parakramabahu V, younger brother of Bhuvanekabahu IV, ascends the throne.
1359		Death of Parakramabahu V after a reign of 8 years. Vikramabahu III, nephew of Bhuvanekabahu II IV and Parakramabahu V (son of Bhuvanekabahu IV), ascends the throne.
1360		Theravada Buddhism becames the state religion of the Ayutthaya Kingdom under Uthong. Sri Lankan monks leave for Thailand to spread Buddhism.
1374		Death of Vikramabahu III after a reign of 15 years. Bhuvanekabahu V, son of Parakramabahu V, ascends the throne.
1391		Deposition of Bhuvanekabahu V after a reign of 17 years; Vira Bahu II, brother-in-law of Bhuvanekabahu V, ascends the throne.
1396		Bhuvanekabāhu makes Kotțē his capital.

=== 15th century ===
Year	Date	Event
1405		Zheng He, Ming dynasty admiral, lands in Sri Lanka during his treasure voyages; later returns in 1411 during the Ming–Kotte War.
1406		Death of Vira Bahu II after a reign of 15 years; Vira Alakesvara (Vijaya Bahu VI), member of the Giri family, ascends the throne.
1408–1438		Chinese naval expeditions demand tribute, abduct Vīra Alakeśvara to China.
1411		Vira Alakesvara is captured after a reign of 5 years during the Ming–Kotte War.
1412		Parakramabahu VI, son of Vijaya Bahu VI, ascends the throne at Kotte, becoming the last native sovereign to unify the island.
1412		Chiang Mai scholar Phra Ñāṇakitti Thera visits Sri Lanka to study Pali scriptures.
1419		Italian merchant Niccolò de' Conti visits Sri Lanka during his travels across Asia.
1447–50		Bhuvanaikabahu VI conquers the Jaffna kingdom, and is incoporated into the Kingdom of Kotte.
1467		Death of Parakramabahu VI after a reign of 55 years. Jayabahu II, grandson of Parakramabahu VI, ascends the throne.
1467		The Jaffna kingdom regains independence from the kingdom of Kotte.
1469		Jayabahu II is deposed after a reign of 2 years; Bhuvanekabahu VI (Sapumal Kumaraya), adopted son of Parakramabahu VI, ascends the throne.
1469		The lands of the Kande uḍa pas raṭa (‘the five regions of the hill country’) succeed from the Kingdom of Kotte, led by Sēnasammata Vikramabāhu.
1469		Accession of Senasammata Vikramabahu as the first monarch of Kandy and reigns until 1511.
1476		Dhammazedi of Burma sent an embassy to Sri Lanka to obtain Higher Ordination, establishing the Kalyani Nikaya in Burma.
1477		Death of Bhuvanekabahu VI after a reign of 8 years. Parakramabahu VII, son of Bhuvanekabahu VI, ascends the throne, is deposed after several months, and Parakramabahu VIII, adopted son of Parakramabahu VI, ascends the throne.
1489		Death of Parakramabahu VIII after a reign of 12 years. Parakramabahu IX, eldest son of Parakramabahu VIII, ascends the throne.

=== 16th century ===
Year	Date	Event
1502	1 October	An annular solar eclipse is visible over Galle.
1505	15 November	Lourenço de Almeida, Portuguese explorer, lands at Galle.
1507	13 January	An annular solar eclipse is visible over Kandy, Colombo, and Galle.
1511		Senasammata Vikramabahu dies and is succeeded by his son Jayavira as the second monarch of Kandy. Bandara reigns until 1552.
1513		Death of Parakramabahu IX after a reign of 24 years. Vijayabahu VII, younger brother of Parakramabahu IX, ascends the throne.
1518		Vijayabahu VI, insulted with after being demanded by the Portuguese that he should sell to them the royal stockpile of cinnamon at a fixed low price, went to war in 1518.
1519		Cankili I rules in Jaffna.
1521		Vijayabahu VI went to war with the Portuguese again on the same issue 3 years later. Losing the war, the king was forced to negotiate for peace after severe losses to his army, further weaking the state.
1521		In an effort to enhace his and his supporter's power over the monarchy and the royal court, the Ekanayake of Kotte (head of the civil government), assisted by a noble named Kandure Bandara plotted to kill the three elder sons of Vijayabahu VI to ensure the succession of Vijayabahu's minor fourth son, by a second queen, Dewarajasinha. The three Princes, Bhuvanekabahu, Pararajasinha and Mayadunne escape to other parts of the island to rally support, leading to the beginning of the Vijayabā Kollaya.
1521		Vijayabahu VI breaks a truce and attempts to assassinate the three princes as they enter the palace grounds. In retaliation the palace is sacked and Vijayabahu is put to death. The eldest rince Bhuvanekabahu is acclaimed the new king of Kotte while Pararajasinha and Mayadunne are installed as kings owing allegiance to their elder brother.
1521		Pararajasinha becomes the King of the newly established Kingdom of Raigama which is made up of roughly 660 villages in the Rayigam, Pasdun and Wallalawiti korales less the seaports. Mayadunne becomes the King of the Kingdom of Sitawaka which included the Four Korales, Denawaka (or the Five Korales), half of Hewagam korale, Kuruwiti korale, Atulugam korale, Panawal korale, Handapandunu korale, Beligal korale, and Dehigampal korale. Bhuvanekabahu as the Kotte sovereign continued to be acknowledged as overlord by the kings of Raigama and Sitawaka.
1521		Weerasuriya or Pilasse Vidiye Bandara, a nephew of Vijayabahu VI and Manamperi, the king's equerry, start a rebeillion in the Hapitigam korale a short time after the accession of the three monarchs. According to Fernao de Queyroz, with the Ekanayake of Vijayabahu VI, Weerasuriya proclaimed himself King of Kotte. However Weerasuriya is executed promptly after a battle with the three brothers, marking the end of organized opposition to the new regime in Kotte.
~1537		In the last few years of his life Pararajasinha seems to have settled at Mapitigama in the Atulugam korale, of Sitawaka Kingdom, abandoning the Raigama government and leaving it to Mayadunne.
1538		Pararajasinha dies. The lands of the Kingdom of Raigama are taken over by the Sitawaka kingdom. Bhuvanekabahu does not contest this and in fact legitimised Mayadunne's annexation by presenting him a formal grant of Raigama.
1543		Cankili orders 600 Christians in Mannar killed.
1551		Bhuvanekabahu VII is accidentally shot after a reign of 30 years; Dharmapala, grandson of Bhuvanekabahu VII, ascends the throne of Kotte.
1552		Karalliyadde Bandara, son of Jayavira Bandara, succeeded his father as King of Kandy and regined until 1582.
1560		Portuguese conquest of the Jaffna kingdom: The Portuguese invade and annex the Jaffna kingdom and take king Cankili II as a POW.
1560		Portuguese capture Nallur and build a fort on the island of Mannar.
1565		Portuguese abandon Kotte and make Colombo the capital.
1580		Dharmapala wills the whole island of Ceylon to Portugal.
1581		Death of Mayadunne after a reign of 60 years; Rajasinha I, son of Mayadunne, ascends the throne of Sitawaka.
1582		The reigning monarch Karalliyadde Bandara dies. Kusumasana Devi, daughter of Karalliyadde Bandara, is installed as Queen, by the Portuguese, succeeding her father.
1582		Kusumasana Devi is deposed by Rajasinha I of Sitawaka beginning the Sitawaka occupation of Kandy.
1587	June	Rajasinha I attacks the Potugese in the Siege of Colombo (1587–1588). The Portuguese attack Kandy in retaliation.
1591		The Portuguese invade Jaffna and kill Puviraja Pandaram and set up Ethirimana Cinkam as a king.
1592		Nephew of Karalliyadde Bandara and heir to the Kandyan throne Yamasinghe Bandara, who fled to the Portuguese, is installed as King of Kandy by the Portuguese but dies soon after his installation.

== Kandyan period ==
=== 16th century ===
Year	Date	Event
1592		Konnapu Bandara, who was the Commander-in-Chief of the Portuguese forces in Kandy turns on the Portuguese and kills Yamasinghe Bandara and ascends the throne as Vimaladharmasuriya I beginning the Kandyan period of Sri Lanka.
1592	1592–1604	Vimaladharmasuriya I restored higher ordination by obtaining monks from Arakan and brought the Tooth Relic to Kandy.
1593		Rajasinha I dies and the Kingdom of Sitawaka falls. The majority of its lands are taken over by the Kandyan kingdom while parts are occupied by the Portuguese.
1594		The Kandyan Kingdom is invaded by the Portuguese Captain-general Pedro Lopes de Sousa, to reinstall Kusumasana Devi onto the throne.
1594	~October	Having defeated the Portuguese at Danture, Vimaladharmasuriya I marries Kusumasana Devi to establish a legal claim to the throne.
1594		Vimaladharma Suriya I builds the Dalada Maligawa and palace in Kandy.
1597	27 May	Dharmapala of Kotte dies, donating the Kingdom of Kotte, and with it the overloardship of the island to the king of Portugal.

=== 17th century ===
Year	Date	Event
1602	30 May	Dutch naval officer Joris van Spilbergen lands in Batticaloa with three ships after a 12-month voyage seeking to establish trade between the two nations. He is the first Dutch envoy to make contact with Sri Lanka. They discussed the possibility that in exchange for Dutch military assistance to expel the Portuguese from the coastal areas.
1602	3–5 June	van Spilbergen met with ruler of Batticaloa.
1602	July	van Spilbergen undertook a trip to the interior of Sri Lanka to meet the king of Kandy Vimaladharmasuriya I
1602	28 November	Sebald de Weert arrived two months after Spilbergen's departure, to follow through on implementing Spilbergen's negotiations.
1603		1st Kuruvita Rala Revolt and Kangara Arachchi Revolt
1604		Vimaladharmasuriya I dies and Senarat ascends the throne.
1604	29 April	An annular solar eclipse is visible over Anuradhapura.
1604		Death of Vimaladharmasuriya I after a reign of 12 years. Senarat, cousin of Vimaladharmasuriya I, ascends the throne of Kandy.
1607		French navigator François Pyrard de Laval is shipwrecked and visits Sri Lanka.
1612		Kusumasana Devi dies.
1612	11 March	Marcelis de Boshouwer , a Dutch merchant in the service of the East India Company, traveled to Kandy and concluded a new treaty of friendship there, with Senarat of Kandy, in which they agreed to support each other militarily against the Portuguese and in return the king granted the Dutch permission to construct a fortress, the right of unrestricted commerce, and a monopoly on cinnamon, pearls, and precious stones.
~1612		Senarat marries Sūriya Mahadassin, daughter of Vimaladharmasuriya I and Kusumasana Devi.
1614		Portugal declares cinnamon trade a royal monopoly.
1615		Senarat sent de Boshouwer to Holland to obtain the long-promised Dutch support, however was denied as the VOC was preoccupied with the Dutch East Indies and the States-General with the Thirty Years' War. Boschouwer then presented himself at the Danish court as a representative of the “Emperor of Ceylon”.
1615	March	A three-tailed comet emerged, striking panic and anxiety across the nation. According to a Portuguese historian, the event was immediately succeeded by a widespread plague that struck down both humans and livestock. Furthermore, massive die-offs of fish left rotting bodies that severely contaminated the air.
1615	14 April	A powerful earthquake completely leveled the city of Colombo. The convulsion released suffocating sulfur vapors from the deep cracks, while widespread fires further intensified the devastation of that catastrophic night.
1616		Nikapitiye Bandara Revolt begins and lasts until 1617
1616		2nd Kuruvita Rala Revolt begins and lasts until 1619
1617		Sūriya Mahadassin dies.
~1617		Senarat marries Antanassin, daughter of Vimaladharmasuriya I and Kusumasana Devi.
1630		Portuguese invade the Kandyan Kingdom.
1635		Death of Senarat after a reign of 31 years. Rajasinha II, son of Senarat and Queen Dona Catherina, ascends the throne of Kandy.
Unknown		During the reign of Rajasinha II, Kandy reaches the peak of its power.
Unknown		Rajasinha II revives the practice of securing brides from Madura.
1636		Rajasinha II formally requests the Dutch to help rid the island of the Portuguese.
1638	28 March	Battle of Gannoruwa between Kandyans and Portuguese.
1638	23 May	A Kandyan–Dutch alliance is formed with the signing of the Kandyan Treaty of 1638 (also known as the Westerwolt Treaty of 1638) in Batticaloa, between Rajasinha II and the VOC commander Adam Westerwolt, with the primary objective being the expulsion of the Portuguese from the island.
1640	13 March	The Dutch forces capture Galle.
1656	12 May	After a siege of seven months Dutch forces capture Colombo and it is made the seat of the Dutch Political Council.
1657		Dutch minister Philippus Baldaeus arrives, documenting the geography, history, and Religion of Ceylon.
1658	1 June	An annular solar eclipse is visible over Kandy, Colombo, and Galle.
1658	22 June	Jaffna surrendered to Dutch.
1658	23 June	The Portuguese are driven away from Sri Lanka with the help of the Dutch.
1658		The establishment of Dutch power in the maritime provinces is complete.
1660	2 July	Robert Knox, an English sea captain, is captured by King Rajasinghe II and held prisoner for 19 years, later publishing An Historical Relation of the Island Ceylon.
1662		Dutch Golden Age painter Esaias Boursse lands in Sri Lanka as an officer of the Dutch East India Company.
1670–1675		First Kandyan–Dutch war between the Kandyan Kingdom and the Dutch.
1672		German physician and botanist Paul Hermann arrives in Sri Lanka to document its flora, forming the basis of Carl Linnaeus's *Flora Zeylanica*.
1672		Sieur de La Nérolle, French diplomat, arrives with a French fleet to establish a post at Trincomalee.
1687		Joseph Vaz, Goan Catholic priest, secretly enters Sri Lanka during Dutch persecution to revive the Catholic Church.
1687	25 November	Death of Rajasinha II after a reign of 52 years. Vimaladharmasuriya II, son of Rajasinha II, ascends the throne of Kandy.

=== 18th century ===
Year	Date	Event
1705		Jacome Gonsalves, Goan missionary and linguist, arrives in Sri Lanka and authors foundational Catholic literature in Sinhala and Tamil.
1706		1706 Kandyan Embassy to Madura to look for a bride for the heir to the throne Vira Narendra Sinha.
1707	4 June	Death of Vimaladharmasuriya II after a reign of 20 years. Vira Narendra Sinha, son of Vimaladharmasuriya II, ascends the throne of Kandy.
1716–1720		Kandyan Kingdom closes its border to the Dutch.
1730		1730–31 Dutch Embassy to Kandy
1731		1731–32 Dutch Embassy to Kandy
1731	4 July	An annular solar eclipse is visible over Galle.
1736		German Johann Wolfgang Heydt, who is in the service of the VOC, accompanies Dutch ambassador to Kandy and produces sketches of the city and palace.
1739	13 May	Death of Vira Narendra Sinha after a reign of 32 years. Sri Vijaya Rajasinha, brother-in-law of Vira Narendra Sinha, ascends the throne.
1739		1739 Kandyan Embassy to Madura to look for a bride for the heir to the throne Sri Vijaya Rajasinha.
1747	21 April	Sri Vijaya Rajasinha marries another Madurai bride.
1747	11 August	Death of Sri Vijaya Rajasinha after a reign of 8 years. Kirti Sri Rajasinha, brother-in-law of Sri Vijaya Rajasinha, ascends the throne.
1749		Kirti Sri Rajasinha marries the daughter if Nadukattu Sami Nayakkar.
1753	20 July	Under the patronage of Kirti Sri Raajasinha and the guidance of Velivita Sri Saranankara, Higher Ordination was re-established via an embassy from Siam (Thailand), founding the Siam Nikaya.
1754		Leopold Immanuel Jacob van Dort, Dutch painter, works in Ceylon documenting local life and architecture.
1759		Kromma Muen Thepphiphit, Siamese royal prince, arrives in Sri Lanka as a political exile.
1762	5 May	The 1762 Pybus Embassy to Kandy is the first official connection between Kandyan Kingdom and the British.
1764–1766		Second Kandyan–Dutch war between the Kandyan Kingdom and the Dutch.
1770	3 January	Kirti Sri Rajasinha marries another South Indian bride.
1780		Prince Kannasamy, the future Sri Vikrama Rajasinha is born in Madurai.
1782	2 January	Death of Kirti Sri Rajasinha after a reign of 35 years. Sri Rajadhi Rajasinha, younger brother of Kirti Sri Rajasinha, ascends the throne.
1782		1782 Boyd Embassy to Kandy.
Unknown		At the request of Kirti Sri Rajasinha, the latter part of the Culavamsa, from 1326 onwards, was written by Tibbotuvāve Buddharakkhita, the chief incumbent of the Mavatta monastery.
1785	22 March	Sri Lankan born Burgher pioneer of Dutch democracy and republic leader Quint Ondaatje demands democracy in speech at Utrecht city hall.
1795		1795–96 Andrew Embassy to Kandy.
1796	15 February	Colombo is taken over by British Forces
1796	16 February	Dutch rule of Sri Lankan territory ends.
1798	26 July	Death of Sri Rajadhi Rajasinha after a reign of 16 years. Sri Vikrama Rajasinha, nephew of Queen Upendra Ammani (wife of Sri Rajadhi Rajasinha), ascends the throne as the final monarch of Sri Lanka.

=== 19th century ===
Year	Date	Event
1800		1800 MacDowall Embassy to Kandy.
1802	27 March	Sri Lanka ceded to Britain by Treaty of Amiens and becomes the Crown Colony of Ceylon.
1803		First Kandyan War: British forces attack the Kingdom of Kandy after the King's Adigar Pilimatalawe defected.
1803	5 May	The Amarapura Nikāya was established by monks who obtained ordination in Burma.
1803		Sri Lankan monks ordained in Amarapura, Burma, establish the Amarapura Nikaya in Sri Lanka to supplement the Siam Nikaya.
1805		John D'Oyly is made the chief translator for the Kandyan government.
1813		American Missionaries found the Batticotta Seminary.
1815	10 January	The British Empire declares war on the Kingdom of Kandy.
1815	11 January	British troops enter the Kandyan territory.
1815	14 February	British Headquarters established in the city of Kandy.
1815	18 February	The King of Kandy Sri Vikrama Rajasinha is taken prisoner.
1815	2 March	Sri Vikrama Rajasinha is deposed after a reign of 17 years following the signing of the Kandyan Convention, ending native monarchical rule in Sri Lanka.

== British Ceylon period ==
=== 19th century ===
Year	Date	Event
1815	2 March	The Kingdom of Kandy is ceded to the British in an agreement signed between the Kandyan chiefs and the Governor of British occupied territory Sir Robert Brownrigg.
1815	5 March	Sri Vikrama Rajasinha losses his throne.
1815	10 March	Kandyan Convention signed.
1816		John Davy, British physician and chemist, arrives in Ceylon and documents its geology, medicine, and history.
1817	October	The Kandyans rebel against British rule in the Great Rebellion of 1817–1818.
1817	18 May	An annular solar eclipse is visible over Jaffna and Anuradhapura.
1823		First coffee plantation at Sinhapitiya.
1832		Colebrooke-Cameron Report; rājakāriya abolished.
1832	30 January	Death of former monarch Sri Vikrama Rajasinha in exile at Vellore Fort, South India.
1833	13 March	The final recommendations were officially instituted under a new Charter of Justice, which established the island's first Executive and Legislative Councils, among a list of other national reforms.
1833		Sri Lanka brought under a unified government for the first time in years and administered through five provinces.
1834		The Kandyan administrative and social structure is dismantled.
1835	9 October	Royal College, the first government-run secondary school for boys is established with the name Hillstreet Academy in Colombo.
1844		Slavery abolished in Sri Lanka.
1846		Samuel Baker, English explorer, moves to Ceylon and establishes an agricultural settlement at Nuwara Eliya.
1848	26 July	A peasant uprising led by popular leaders Gongalegoda Banda and Puran Appu takes place against oppressive colonial tax policies, marking a crucial transition from feudal revolts to modern independence struggles.
1848	10 October	Martial law declared in Kandyan Provinces.
1858		Telegraph communication with India begins.
1860		In Sri Lanka, against all expectations, the monastic and lay communities bring about a major revival in Buddhism, a movement that goes hand in hand with growing nationalism; the revival follows a period of persecution by foreign powers. Since then, Buddhism has flourished, and Sri Lankan monks and expatriate lay people have been prominent in spreading Theravada Buddhism in Asia, the West, and even in Africa.
1862		Forest monks led by Ven. Paññānanda receive re-ordination in Burma, returning to Sri Lanka in 1863 to establish the Ramañña Nikaya.
1863	12 June	The Rāmañña Nikāya is established.
1867		Opening of Colombo-Kandy Railroad.
1869		Prince Alfred, son of Queen Victoria, makes the first British royal visit to Ceylon.
1870		A severe outbreak of coffee rust fungus (Hemileia vastatrix) devastates Ceylon's coffee plantations, forcing a transition to tea cultivation.
1871	27 March	The first ever scientific Census of Sri Lanka was conducted by the Registrar General's Office, making it the first of any country in South Asia. The census enumarated a population of 2,400,380 people.
1871	12 December	A total solar eclipse is visible over Jaffna.
1873	26–8 August	The Pānadurā Vādaya, a public debate where Ven. Mohottiwatte Gunaananda Thera defeated Christian adversaries, sparked a national Buddhist re-awakening.
1873		Ven. Hikkaduwe Sri Sumangala Thera establishes the Vidyodaya Pirivena and Ven. Ratmalane Sri Dharmaloka Thera establishes the Vidyalankara Pirivena (1875), launching a major modern revival of Buddhist monastic education.
1875		British photographer Julia Margaret Cameron moves to Ceylon, continuing her pioneer portrait photography.
1878–1883		Coffee blight destroys plantations; replaced with tea.
1880		Madame Blavatsky and Colonel Olcott became the first Westerners to receive the refuges and precepts, the ceremony by which one traditionally becomes a Buddhist; thus Blavatsky was the first Western woman to do so.
1880		Henry Trimen arrives as Director of the Royal Botanical Gardens at Peradeniya.
1881	26 February	P&O's SS Ceylon leaves Liverpool to begin the world's first round-the-world pleasure cruise.
1881	17 February	The 2nd national Census of Sri Lanka enumarates a population of 2,759,738 people.
1881		German biologist Ernst Haeckel visits Ceylon to conduct marine biological research.
1886	1 November	Ananda College, the first Buddhist school in Sri Lanka is established with 37 students.
1887		Japanese Zen Buddhist masters Soyen Shaku and Shaku Kozen arrive in Sri Lanka to study Theravada Buddhism and Pali.
1890		Spearheaded by local figures, organized efforts against alcohol consumption began in the Southern Province.
1891	26 February	The 3rd national Census of Sri Lanka enumarates a population of 3,007,789 people.
1891		Anagarika Dharmapala establishes the Maha Bodhi Society in India to restore and reintroduce Buddhist heritage and sites.
1893		Archduke Franz Ferdinand of Austria visits Ceylon during his world tour.
1895		German Indologist Wilhelm Geiger makes his first research visit to Sri Lanka to translate the Mahavamsa.
1897	15 January	Swami Vivekananda visits Sri Lanka, receiving a grand public reception in Colombo and Jaffna.
1897		Waste Lands Ordinance enacted.

=== 20th century ===
Year	Date	Event
1900	9 August	The Second Boer War prisoner-of-war camp is opened in Diyatalawa, housing thousands of captured Boers from South Africa.
1901	1 March	The 4th national Census of Sri Lanka enumarates a population of 3,565,954 people.
1901	11 November	An annular solar eclipse is visible over Jaffna, Anuradhapura, and Kandy.
1902		
1903		
1904		First continental European, Anton Walther Florus Gueth, was accepted into the Sangha as Ñāṇatiloka Bhikkhu. Ñāṇatiloka went on to become the father of western monks in Ceylon.
1904		Leonard Woolf arrives in Ceylon as a British civil servant, serving in Jaffna, Kandy, and Hambantota.
1905	1 August	The Northern line is completed with trains from Colombo arriving at Jaffna Railway Station.
1906		
1907		
1908		Eugénie de Montijo, former Empress of the French, visits Ceylon.
1909		
1910		
1911	1 March	The 5th national Census of Sri Lanka enumarates a population of 4,106,350 people.
1912		The German monk Nyanatiloka founded the first monastery for Western Theravada monks, the Island Hermitage, in Sri Lanka.
1912		First Election to Legislative Council.
1913		
1914		Railway and ferry service between India and Ceylon begins.
1915	28 May	Religious and cultural disputes over Buddhist processions near mosques escalates severely into riots due to a heavy-handed British military crackdown under martial law. Unrest ended on 8 August of that year. The event ultimately catalyzed the island's independence movement.
1915	2 June–21 August	Martial law after Sinhalese-Muslim riots.
1916		
1917		
1918		
1919		
1920		
1921	18 March	The 6th national Census of Sri Lanka enumarates a population of 4,497,854 people.
1922		Rabindranath Tagore, Indian Nobel laureate, visits Sri Lanka on a cultural tour (re-visited in 1928 and 1934).
1923		
1924		Colombo radio station opened.
1925	16 December	Radio broadcasting in Sri Lanka officially launched with Radio Ceylon, making it the very first radio broadcaster in Asia.
1926		
1927	12 November	Mahatma Gandhi arrives in Sri Lanka for a three-week tour promoting non-violence, social reform, and khadi.
1927	13 November	The commissioners for the Donoughmore Commission, a British parliamentary task force to set up a progressive new constitution for Sri Lanka, introducing universal adult suffrage and a unique executive committee system to foster power-sharing across ethnic lines, are appointed by Sydney Webb, the British Labour Secretary of State for the Colonies.
1928		
1929		Chilean poet Pablo Neruda serves as Consul of Chile in Colombo.
1930		
1931	7 July	Donoughmore Commission: The resulting Donoughmore Constitution officially went into effect with the opening of the first State Council of Ceylon and established Universal suffrage. The adult franchise was extended to women above the age of 21, regardless of their educational status. At the time Sri Lanka became one of the first Asian countries to allow voting rights to women. The Donoughmore Constitution remained in place until 1947.
1931	26 February	The 7th national Census of Sri Lanka enumarates a population of 5,306,863 people. Due to the global economic depression, this census was heavily restricted. A full census was only conducted for Colombo city, with a basic head count for the rest of the island.
1931		First elections to State Council.
1932		
1933	11 November	The Suriya-Mal Movement, a Sri Lankan anti-imperialist and social welfare initiative raising money by selling local suriya flowers (sunflower) for Ceylonese ex-servicemen begins in protests to funds from British Poppy Day going exclusively to British veterans
1934	September	An initial uptick in malaria cases was first noticed at rural dispensaries in the latter half of September and spread further into October following heavy rains that disrupted a prolonged drought.
1935	18 December	The major Trotskyist political party Lanka Sama Samaja Party is founded by Leslie Goonewardene, N. M. Perera, Colvin R. de Silva, Philip Gunawardena and Robert Gunawardena.
1936		Second elections to State Council.
1937		
1938		Ratmalana airport opened; Radio Ceylon broadcasts in Sinhala.
1939		Bank of Ceylon established.
1939	1 September	India bans emigration to Sri Lanka.
1940		
1941		
1942	5 April	Ceylon in World War II: Colombo is attacked by air in the Easter Sunday raid by the Imperial Japanese Navy in an effort to destroy the British Eastern Fleet located at that port.
1942	9 April	Ceylon in World War II: Trincomalee is attacked by air in a raid during the Indian Ocean raid by naval aircraft of the Imperial Japanese Navy in an effort to destroy the British Eastern Fleet located at that harbour.
1942	8 May	Ceylon in World War II: Sri Lankan soldiers stationed in the Cocos (Keeling) Islands mutiny against British officers.
1942	1 July	The University of Ceylon was established on by the Ceylon University Ordinance No. 20 of 1942, replacing University College.
1943		
1944		The All Ceylon Tamil Congress (ACTC), the first Sri Lankan Tamil political party, is founded by G. G. Ponnambalam.
1945	September	The final report of the Soulbury Commission, a constitutional reform initiative that drafted the framework for the island's eventual transition to independence, was published.
1946	19 March	The 8th national Census of Sri Lanka, originally scheduled for 1941, was delayed by five years due to the war. This census enumarates a population of 6,657,339 people.
1946	15 May	Ceylon granted a new constitution.
1947	15 August	First election under Dominion Status.
1947	26 September	Cabinet takes office.
1947	25 November	Parliament opens.
1947	10 December	The Soulbury Constitution comes into force, establishing a Westminster-style bicameral parliament for Ceylon.
1948		

== Sri Lanka since 1948 ==
=== 20th century ===
Year	Date	Event
1948	4 February	The Sri Lankan people officially achieve independence from over 130 years of British colonial rule, transitioning into the self-governing Dominion of Ceylon within the British Commonwealth.
1948	15 November	The Ceylon Citizenship Act is passed in parliarment, the first foundational law determining citizenship in newly independent Sri Lanka. It established citizenship by descent and registration, but controversially excluded large numbers of Indian Tamil plantation workers, rendering them stateless.
1949	24 August	The Gal Oya Multipurpose Scheme, a landmark agricultural and river valley development project is initiated to harness the Gal Oya River in the Eastern Province. It aimed to achieve food security and resettle over 250,000 landless people from the wet zone into the underdeveloped dry zone.
1949	18 December	A group of three Sri Lankan Tamil politicians, S. J. V. Chelvanayakam, C. Vanniasingam and Senator E. M. V. Naganathan, split from the All Ceylon Tamil Congress (ACTC) to form the Ilankai Tamil Arasu Kachchi (ITAK).
1950	January	The Colombo Plan is established as a regional intergovernmental organization to boost economic and social development in the Asia-Pacific region. Centered on the concepts of self-help and mutual assistance, it operates through partnerships to enhance human capital and technical cooperation
1950	13 February	A new national Flag is adopted.
1950	25 May	World Fellowship of Buddhists is founded in Colombo, Sri Lanka.
1950	28 August	Central Bank of Sri Lanka is established. Sri Lanka becomes member of International Monetary Fund and World Bank.
1951	2 March	The Sri Lanka Air Force is founded as the Royal Ceylon Air Force (RCyAF), the aerial defense branch of the Sri Lanka Armed Forces.
1951	July	S. W. R. D. Bandaranaike leaves the United National Party (UNP) to form the Sri Lanka Freedom Party (SLFP).
1951		FP demands autonomy for Tamils of North and East.
1952	22 March	Prime Minister D. S. Senanayake dies.
1952	24 May	UNP wins second Parliamentary elections.
1952	18 December	A landmark trade deal with China, the Rubber-Rice Pact, is signed.
1953	20 March	The 9th national Census of Sri Lanka enumarates a population of 8,097,845 people. The census was delayed until 1953 due to a severe global shortage of paper.
1953	12–13 August	A nation-wide demonstration of civil disobedience and strike, was held organized to protest against the policies and actions of the incumbent United National Party government.
1953	12 October	Prime Minister Dudley Senanayake resigns.
1954	13 February	Indo-Ceylon agreement signed.
1954	10 April	Elizabeth II visits Sri Lanka. Her second visit was in October 1981 to celebrate 50 years of universal adult franchise
1954	17 July	Sir Oliver Goonetilleke becomes first Lankan Governor-General.
1955	20 June	A total solar eclipse is visible over Anuradhapura, Kandy, and Colombo.
1955	14 December	Sri Lanka is officially admitted as a member state of the United Nations under Resolution 109.
1956	5 April	The Mahajana Eksath Peramuna (MEP), led by S. W. R. D. Bandaranaike wins the general elections in a landslide.
1956	23 May	The 2500th Buddha Jayanti (anniversary of the Buddha's Parinibbaana) was celebrated, ushering in a period of significant religious activity and government support.
1956	15 June	Parliament approves the Sinhalese Language Bill.
1956	7 July	The Official Language Act (No. 33 of 1956), also known as the Sinhala Only Act, is passed by the Parliament of Ceylon. The act replaced English with Sinhala as the sole official language of Ceylon, with the controversial exclusion of Tamil.
1956	28 December	Lester James Peries' masterpiece Rekava premieres.
1957	26 July	Bandaranaike and Chelvanayakam Pact.
1957	19 September	Rice and Rubber Pact with China.
1957	15 October	Sri Lanka takes over the Trincomalee air and naval base.
1957	1 November	The British Royal Navy officially hands over the strategic naval base of Trincomalee and Katunayake air base to the Sri Lankan Government, after Prime Minister S. W. R. D. Bandaranaike requested the removal of all British service personnel from the island.
1958	1 January	Bus transportation nationalized.
1958	9 April	Bandaranaike abandons Bandaranaike-Chelvanayakam pact.
1958	22 May	Deteriorating relations between government policies and the Sri Lankan Tamils erupt into island-wide Riots.
1958	26 May	A declaration of emergency is proclaimed as the riots intensify.
1958	August	The Sinhala Only Act is amended and the Tamil Language (Special Provisions) Act of 1958 is passed in Ceylon, thus making Tamil an official language of Ceylon.
1958		Ven. Nyanaponika Thera establishes the Buddhist Publication Society in Kandy to publish English-language Theravada literature.
1958		A. T. Ariyaratne founds the Sarvodaya Shramadana Movement to apply Buddhist social principles to community development.
1959	18 February	Under the Universities Act, Vidyodaya Pirivena is formally reconstituted as the Vidyodaya University (now the University of Sri Jayewardenepura).
1959	25 September	Prime Minister S. W. R. D. Bandaranaike is assassinated while meeting the public at his private residence.
1960	19 March	Fourth general elections.
1960	23 April	Fourth Parliament Dissolved.
1960	21 July	Sirimavo Bandaranaike, wife of S. W. R. D. Bandaranaike, becomes the world's first elected female head of government, as Prime Minister.
1960	December	The government took over private Buddhist and Christian schools to ensure a national system of education.
1960	31 December	Sinhala made the only official language of the country.
1961	April	FP carries out civil disobedience campaign.
1961	1 July	The People's Bank of Ceylon is officially established under Act No. 29 of 1961.
1961	29 May	The Ceylon Petroleum Corporation is founded with the Ceylon Petroleum Corporation Act No. 28 of 1961.
1962	27 January	A group of Christian officers in the military and police planned to topple the government of Prime Minister Sirimavo Bandaranaike
1963	30 April	Emergency rule ends after more than two years.
1963	8 July	The 10th national Census of Sri Lanka, originally scheduled for 1961 was pushed back two years as it faced faced administrative obstacles, enumarates a population of 10,582,064 people.
1964	30 October	The Sirima–Shastri Pact a bilateral agreement between Sri Lankan Prime Minister Sirimavo Bandaranaike and Indian Prime Minister Lal Bahadur Shastri is signed. It provides for the expatriation of 525,000 people of Indian origin and aimed to resolve the citizenship status of nearly 1 million stateless Tamils of Indian origin who were brought to Sri Lanka to work on plantations while under British occupation.
1964	3 December	14 Members of Parliament resign.
1965	22 March	The United National Party led by Dudley Senanayake wins the 1965 Ceylonese parliamentary election, with Senanayake becoming Prime Minister; PM Dudley Senanayake fails to implement agreement with FP.
1965	14 May	The Janatha Vimukthi Peramuna is established.
1966	6 January	The Tamil Language (Special Provisions) Act No. 28 of 1958 was passed to allow for the use of the Tamil language in administration, education, and public service exams
1966	11 January	Act passed to allow use of the Tamil language in the northern and eastern provinces.
1966	May	The World Buddhist Sangha Council is convened by Theravadins in Sri Lanka with the hope of bridging differences and working together. The first convention is attended by leading monks from many countries and sects, Mahayana as well as Theravada. Nine Basic Points Unifying the Theravada and Mahayana are written by Ven. Walpola Rahula are approved unanimously.
1966	2 May	The Ceylon Tourist Board, now the Sri Lanka Tourism Development Authority, was created by the Ceylon Tourist Board Act No. 10 of 1966.
1966	July	World Buddhist Congress in Colombo.
1966	7 July	Major General Richard Udugama, Commander of the Army was detained under emergency regulations and suspended from command in the 1966 alleged Ceylonese coup attempt.
1966	December	The four Poya days were officially made weekend holidays.
1967	5 January	Radio Ceylon transitioned into a public corporation named the Ceylon Broadcasting Corporation
1967	22 November	Devaluation of the rupee.
1968		The United Front is founded as a socialist republican political alliance, a coalition formed by the Sri Lanka Freedom Party (SLFP), the Lanka Sama Samaja Party (LSSP), and the Communist Party of Ceylon.
1968	15 September	The Federal Party (ITAK) resigns from Dudley Senanayake's cabinet and the eventual exit of the party from the ruling coalition.
1969	6 June	The Ceylon Electricity Board (CEB) is established, replacing the old government department and initiating a massive, coordinated masterplan to expand stable electricity grids to rural, off-grid communities.
1969	December	Universities closed after a student strike.
1970	25 March	Sixth Parliament dissolved.
1970	27 May	The Sri Lanka Freedom Party led United Front alliance wins the 1970 Ceylonese parliamentary elections in a landslide victory with SLFP leader Sirimavo Bandaranaike becoming Prime Minister.
1971	16 March	Emergency declared.
1971	March	The State Pharmaceuticals Corporation of Sri Lanka commences operations in Ratmalana. Developed with Japanese assistance, the facility allows Sri Lanka to manufacture its own high-quality, essential, and affordable generic drugs.
1971	5 April	1971 JVP insurrection: Marxist insurrection conducted by the Janatha Vimukthi Peramuna against the government of Sri Lanka.
1971	9 October	The 11th national Census of Sri Lanka enumarates a population of 12,689,897 people.
1971	11 October	The Indian Ocean Zone of Peace (IOZP) is a landmark diplomatic initiative led by Sri Lanka to prevent the militarization of the region by global powers. It aimed to denuclearize the ocean, eliminate military bases, and protect the maritime environments of developing coastal states
1971		The Policy of standardisation, an affirmative action and university admissions system, is introduced by the government.
1972	22 May	Prime Minister Sirimavo Bandaranaike promulgates the First Republican Constitution of Sri Lanka, renaming Ceylon to Sri Lanka and establishing a unicameral National State Assembly.
1972	22 May	Sri Lankan civil war: Velupillai Prabhakaran founds the Tamil New Tigers, which would later be renamed as the Liberation Tigers of Tamil Eelam (LTTE) in 1976, a Sri Lankan Tamil militant group which advocated for the creation of an independent state of Tamil Eelam in the Northern and the Eastern Provinces of Sri Lanka.
1973	23 July	The Associated Newspapers of Ceylon Limited is Nationalised by Prime Minister Sirimavo Bandaranaike’s United Front government, primarily targeting the press and privately held plantations to centralize the economy and eliminate foreign influence.
1974	26-28 June	Prime Minister Sirimavo Bandaranaike and Indian Prime Minister Indira Gandhi signed the Indo-Sri Lankan Maritime Agreement, officially recognizing Sri Lanka's sovereignty over the small, strategically located island of Kachchatheevu in the Palk Strait.
1974		University admission policies to increase Sinhalese representation in higher education.
1975	7 June	The Sri Lanka national cricket team plays its first-ever official One Day International match at the inaugural Cricket World Cup.
1975	2 September	LSSP expelled from the government.
1976	14 May	TULF adopts Vaddukottai Resolution.
1976		TNF reorganizes as LTTE.
1976	16–19 August	Prime Minister Sirimavo Bandaranaike presides over the gathering of leaders from over 80 nations at the 5th Summit of the Non-Aligned Movement held in Colombo.
1976	August–September	Nonaligned nations' conference held in Colombo.
1977	15 February	Emergency declared.
1977	21 July	J. R. Jayewardene wins a landslide victory, and TULF sweeps northern seats, and introduces "Open Economy" policies, shifting the country toward market liberalization.
1977	September	National State Assembly establishes a presidential form of government.
1977	15 November	The Katunayake Free Trade Zone is established becoming the first country in South Asia to liberalize its economy, driving export-oriented Foreign Direct Investment.
1978	4 February	PM J. R. Jayawardene becomes the first executive president.
1978	19 May	Tamil separatist organizations proscribed.
1978	31 August	President J. R. Jayewardene promulgates the Second Republican Constitution, establishing an Executive Presidency and proportional representation.
1978	August	National State Assembly renamed Parliament.
1978	20 November	First Amendment to the 1978 Constitution is enacted, adjusting Supreme Court writ jurisdiction.
1979	26 February	Second Amendment to the 1978 Constitution is enacted, governing party switching and expulsion of Members of Parliament.
1979	July	Prevention of Terrorism Act passed.
1979	1 September	Air Lanka, now SriLankan Airlines is officially incorporated as the country's new flag carrier.
1979	27 December	Emergency declared in Jaffna.
1980	July	The 1980 General Strike was initiated to demand a Rs. 300 monthly wage increase, it was brutally crushed by President J.R. Jayewardene's administration, resulting in the mass dismissal of 40,356 state and private sector employees.
1980	16 October	Sirimavo Bandaranaike expelled from Parliament.
1981	17 March	The 12th national Census of Sri Lanka, the last fully nationwide count for three decades, enumarates a population of 14,846,750 people.
1981	31 May	The Jaffna Public Library is set alight by mobs, resulting in the loss of over 95,000 unique manuscripts and books.
1981	June	State of Emergency declared during communal violence.
1981	21 July	The Sri Lanka national cricket team was admitted by the ICC as a full member, becoming the eighth Test playing nation.
1982	15 February	The Sri Lanka Rupavahini Corporation begins its transmission, beginning national public television broadcasting in the country.
1982	30 July	State of Emergency declared throughout the country.
1982	27 August	Third Amendment to the 1978 Constitution is enacted, allowing an incumbent President to seek re-election after four years of a term.
1982	20 October	Jayewardene reelected President.
1982	13–17 December	The Sacred City of Anuradhapura, the Ancient City of Polonnaruwa and the Ancient City of Sigiriya are officially designated as UNESCO World Heritage Sites.
1982	23 December	Fourth Amendment to the 1978 Constitution is enacted, extending the term of the 1st Parliament for six years following a national referendum.
1983	25 February	Fifth Amendment to the 1978 Constitution is enacted, altering procedures for filling parliamentary vacancies.
1983	24–30 July	Sri Lankan civil war: Triggered by a LTTE ambush on 13 soldiers, anti-Tamil rioting begins in the capital and spreads to other parts of the country. This event is widely considered the beginning of the Sri Lankan civil war.
1983	4 August	TULF members lose their seats in Parliament when sixth amendment to constitution bans advocacy of separatism.
1983	8 August	Sixth Amendment to the 1978 Constitution is enacted, banning political separatism and requiring loyalty oaths for public officials.
1983	4 October	Seventh Amendment to the 1978 Constitution is enacted, creating Kilinochchi District as the 25th administrative district.
1984	6 March	Eighth Amendment to the 1978 Constitution is enacted, enabling the appointment of President's Counsel.
1984	24 August	Ninth Amendment to the 1978 Constitution is enacted, modifying public officer qualification criteria for parliamentary elections.
1984		All-Parties Conference meet throughout year.
1985	February	Tamil groups propose diplomatic solution.
1985	3 June	Rajiv Gandhi and Jayewardene meet.
1985	8–13 July	Mediated by the Indian government, round one of the Thimphu Talks were held in Bhutan to resolve the escalating Sinhala-Tamil ethnic conflict. They marked the first time the Sri Lankan government and Tamil militant organizations sat at the negotiating table. Round two was held from 12–17 August.
1985	December	Rajiv Gandhi says he would not accept a government military victory.
1986	3 May	Air Lanka Flight 512
1986	June	Jayewardene promises autonomy for the Tamil north.
1986	6 August	Tenth Amendment to the 1978 Constitution is enacted, removing the two-thirds parliamentary majority requirement for states of emergency.
1986	19 December	Jayewardene announces new peace proposals.
1987	15 April	The 1987–1989 JVP insurrection, an armed revolt led by the Marxist–Leninist group begins against the government.
1987	6 May	Eleventh Amendment to the 1978 Constitution is enacted, reorganizing judicial jurisdictions.
1987	26 May	Government invasion of the city of Jaffna.
1987	5 July	First LTTE suicide bomber kills 30 soldiers in Jaffna peninsula.
1987	July	Prabhakaran meets with Rajiv Gandhi in Delhi.
1987	29 July	Sri Lankan civil war: Signing of the Indo-Lanka Accord, leading to the arrival of the Indian Peace Keeping Force (IPKF) and the creation of Provincial Councils.]
1987	28 September	India, Sri Lanka, and LTTE announced a settlement.
1987	5 October	LTTE embarks on war against IPKF.
1987	14 November	Thirteenth Amendment to the 1978 Constitution is enacted under the Indo-Sri Lanka Accord, establishing nine Provincial Councils and recognizing Tamil as an official language.
1988	16 February	Assassination of Vijaya Kumaratunga.
1988	24 May	Fourteenth Amendment to the 1978 Constitution is enacted, expanding Parliament to 225 seats and creating 29 National List seats.
1988	May	IPKF launches Operation Checkmate.
1988	November	First Provincial Council elections held.
1988	5–9 December	The Old Town of Galle and its Fortifications, the Sacred City of Kandy and the Sinharaja Forest Reserve is officially designated as UNESCO World Heritage Sites.
1988	17 December	Fifteenth Amendment to the 1978 Constitution is enacted, lowering the vote threshold for proportional representation from 12.5% to 5%.
1988	17 December	Sixteenth Amendment to the 1978 Constitution is enacted, implementing operational frameworks for Sinhala and Tamil as languages of administration and courts.
1988	19 December	Ranasinghe Premadasa elected President.
1989	8 February	The Sri Dalada Maligawa is attacked by the armed cadres affiliated to Janatha Vimukthi Peramuna (JVP).
1989	15 February	UNP retains parliamentary majority.
1989	1 June	Premadasa asks for Indian withdrawal by July 29.
1989	13 July	LTTE assassinates A. Amirthalingam.
1989	September	Cease-fire between LTTE and IPKF.
1989	October	The "Gami Pubuduwa" (Village Reawakening) rural micro-finance scheme was launched by the Hatton National Bank, empowering hundreds of thousands of rural entrepreneurs and small businesses with credit.
1990	21 March	Last Indian troops leave.
1990	10 June	Sri Lankan civil war: Eelam War II, the second phase of the Sri Lankan civil war begins after the breakdown of peace talks.
1990	October	The Liberation Tigers of Tamil Eelam (LTTE) forcibly expelled an estimated 72,000-75,000 Muslims from the Northern Province in an act widely recognized as ethnic cleansing. The mass eviction occurred over several weeks, devastating the community and permanently altering the region's demographics.
1990	December	Sri Lanka emerged as the world's largest tea exporter.
1991	21 May	Sri Lankan civil war: Former Indian Prime Minister Rajiv Gandhi is assassinated by a female suicide bomber belonging to the Liberation Tigers of Tamil Eelam (LTTE) at an election rally in Sriperumbudur, Tamil Nadu, killing Gandhi and 14 others.
1991	22 December	Colombo hosts the 1991 South Asian Games for the second time.
1991	9–13 December	The Dambulla cave temple is officially designated as a UNESCO World Heritage Site.
1992	May	India proscribes LTTE.
1992	August	Land mine kills government generals in north.
1992	16 November	Sri Lankan civil war: Vice Admiral Clancy Fernando, Commander of the Sri Lanka Navy is assassinated by a Liberation Tigers of Tamil Eelam (LTTE) suicide bomber becoming the highest-ranking military officer ever killed in action during the Sri Lankan civil war.
1993	23 April	Lalith Athulathmudali shot to death.
1993	1 May	Sri Lankan civil war: President Ranasinghe Premadasa is assassinated by a LTTE suicide bomber who detonated an explosive belt during a United National Party May Day rally in central Colombo.
1993	5 May	Ranil Wickremasinghe becomes Prime Minister.
1994	16 August	The People's Alliance wins the 1994 Sri Lankan parliamentary election with party leader Chandrika Kumaratunga becoming the new Prime Minister.
1994	23 October	Bomb kills Gamini Dissanayake.
1994	9 November	Prime Minister Chandrika Kumaratunga is elected President in a landslide victory, receiving 62% of the vote and becoming the first Sri Lankan female President. The election marked the end of 17 years of United National Party rule in Sri Lanka.
1995	January	Sri Lankan civil war: Eelam War II ends following a ceasefire agreement and the start of peace talks between the Liberation Tigers of Tamil Eelam (LTTE) and the newly elected government of President Chandrika Kumaratunga.
1995	19 April	Sri Lankan civil war: Peace talks between the government and the LTTE end and Eelam War III, the third phase of the Sri Lankan civil war begins after the LTTE Bombing of SLNS Sooraya and SLNS Ranasuru.
1995	28 July	LTTE lose 400 cadres in raid on Weli Oya army camp.
1995	17 October–5 December	Government offensive recaptures Jaffna.
1995	5 December	Sri Lankan civil war: In a major military offensive launched by the Sri Lankan Armed Forces, the city of Jaffna is successfully captured from the Liberation Tigers of Tamil Eelam (LTTE) marking a major turning point in the Sri Lankan civil war, ending five years of rebel control.
1996	31 January	Sri Lankan civil war: A suicide truck bomb orchestrated by the Liberation Tigers of Tamil Eelam (LTTE) target the Central Bank of Sri Lanka in a bombing that kills 91 people, injures 1,400 others, and causes catastrophic destruction to the capital's financial district.
1996	17 March	Sri Lanka wins the 1996 Cricket World Cup, defeating Australia by 7 wickets in the final at Lahore, Pakistan.
1996	18 July	LTTE overruns Mullaitivu military base.
1996	8 December	A Bhikkhuni (Buddhist nuns) Order and lineage is revived in Sarnath, India through the efforts of Sakyadhita, an International Buddhist Women Association. The revival is done with some resistance from some of the more literal interpreters of the Buddhist Vinaya (monastic code) and lauded by others in the community.
1997	13 May	Government begins Operation Jaya Sikuru to open military supply route to Jaffna.
1997	15 October	Sri Lankan civil war: The Liberation Tigers of Tamil Eelam bomb the Galadari Hotel and the World Trade Center in Colombo.
1997	8 October	Sri Lankan civil war: The Liberation Tigers of Tamil Eelam (LTTE) was officially proscribed internationally when the U.S. Department of State designated the group as a Foreign Terrorist Organization.
1997	14 October	Truck bomb blast in Colombo Fort.
1998	25 January	Sri Lankan civil war: Liberation Tigers of Tamil Eelam (LTTE) terrorists commit a deadly suicide attack on Sri Lanka's most sacred Buddhist site and a UNESCO World Heritage centre: the Sri Dalada Maligawa, where Buddha's tooth relic is enshrined. Eight civilians are killed and 25 others are injured and significant damage is done to the temple structure, which was first constructed in 1592.
1998	26 January	Government declares LTTE a banned organization.
1998	12–23 February	A international dual-ordination ceremony is held at Bodh Gaya, re-establishing Theravada Bhikkhunis in Sri Lanka through the Dharmaguptaka lineage.
1998	December	Operation Jaya Sikuru called off.
1999	18 December	Sri Lankan civil war: Attempted assassination of Chandrika Kumaratunga three days before reelection.

=== 21st century ===
Year	Date	Event
2000	23 April	The Sri Lankan government loses control of the strategic isthmus and the military Base at Elephant Pass in the Second Battle of Elephant Pass.
2000	8 August	President Chandrika Kumaratunga's People's Alliance government abandon and indefinitely postpone the proposed draft constitution after. The Sri Lankan constitutional reform attempt of 2000 was a major legislative effort to replace the 1978 Constitution. It proposed transitioning from a unitary to a federal system to resolve the civil war with Tamil separatists, but ultimately failed in parliament due to political infighting and not being abe to secure the necessary two-thirds majority in parliament.
2000	28 September	Sprinter Susanthika Jayasinghe wins the silver medal in the Women's 200 metres at the 2000 Summer Olympics held in Sydney Australia, winning Sri Lanka's second ever Olympic medal.
2000	10 October	PA returned to power.
2001	17 July	The originally scheduled 1991 census was cancelled entirely due to the conflict. When a census was finally attempted in 2001, it was incomplete, failing to cover areas in the Northern and Eastern provinces. The 13th national Census of Sri Lanka enumarates an estimated population of 18,797,257 people.
2001	24 July	The Bandaranaike International Airport and the adjoing SLAF Katunayake Air Force base is attacked by suicide bombers of the Black Tigers. The strike crippled national infrastructure and severely damaged the country's economy.
2001	10 October	Kumaratunga dissolves Parliament hours before a no-confidence vote.
2001	14 November	The 17th Amendment to the Constitution passes enabling the creation of the Constitutional Council a federal oversight body designed to depoliticize public service and restrain executive overreach.
2001	3 October	Seventeenth Amendment to the 1978 Constitution is enacted, establishing a Constitutional Council and independent oversight commissions.
2001	5 December	Ranil Wickremesinghe wins parliamentary elections on a pledge to open talks with the Tiger rebels.
2001	31 December	Driven by a series of compounding crises nationally and internationally throughout the year, the Bandaranaike Airport attack, the September 11 attacks and the collapse of the government in December, Sri Lanka recorded negative GDP growth first time since gaining independence in 1948.
2002	21 February	Government and LTTE agree to permanent cease-fire.
2002	22 February	A Ceasefire Agreement mediated by Norway was formally signed between the Government of Sri Lanka and the Liberation Tigers of Tamil Eelam. This agreement ended major offensive military operations and established the Sri Lanka Monitoring Mission, which was composed of representatives from Nordic countries, to oversee the truce
2002	10 April	Prabhakaran holds first press conference in 12 years.
2002	16–18 September	First formal peace talks opened in Thailand.
2003	28 February	Ayya Sudhamma Bhikkhuni became the first American-born woman to gain bhikkhuni ordination in the Theravada school in Sri Lanka.
2003	21 April	LTTE suspends peace talks after sixth round.
2003	9–10 June	The Tokyo Conference on Reconstruction and Development of Sri Lanka was held in Tokyo, Japan. International donors—including Japan, the US, the EU, and various multilateral organizations—pledged over $4.5 billion in aid to help rebuild the island following two decades of civil war.
2003	November	President dismisses three key opposition party ministers.
2004	7 February	Kumaratunga dissolves Parliament and calls for elections on April 2.
2004	3 March	Vinayagamoorthy Muralitharan (widely known as "Colonel Karuna"), LTTE's military leader for the East, split from the LTTE, defecting with an estimated 6,000 fighters over alleged differences with leader Velupillai Prabhakaran. The break triggered internal violence but severely weakened the LTTE, ultimately leading Karuna to enter mainstream Sri Lankan politics
2004	2 April	Kumaratunga's UPFA wins 105 seats in Parliament (UNF 82, TNA 22, JHU 9, SLMC 5, UCPF 1).
2004	2 April	Buddhist monks candidates for the Jathika Hela Urumaya party win nine seats in elections.
2004	8 May	Sri Lankan bowler Muttiah Muralitharan becomes the world's Leading wicket-taker dismissing Zimbabwe's Mluleki Nkala in Harare to claim his 520th Test wicket, officially surpassing Courtney Walsh.
2004	7 July	Suicide bomb blast in Colombo.
2004	26 December	A massive magnitude-9.1 undersea earthquake off the coast of Sumatra, Indonesia triggers an earthquake and tsunami which hits Sri Lanka without warning, becoming the deadliest natural disaster in the country's history causing over 35,000 deaths.
2005	12 August	Sri Lankan Foreign Minister Lakshman Kadirgamar was assassinated by a LTTE sniper, shot as he emerged from a swimming pool at his private residence in Colombo. A state of emergency is declared in the country as the assassination destabilized the fragile 2002 peace process.
2005	26 May	Master composer Premasiri Khemadasa premieres his masterwork the Opera Agni (The Fire) at the Lionel Wendt Theater in Colombo.
2005	17 November	Election of President Mahinda Rajapakse.
2006	February	Government and LTTE meet in Geneva.
2006	May	European Union bans LTTE; increased violence threatens resumption of war.
2006	20 July	the LTTE closed the sluice gates of the Mavil Aru in the Trincomalee district, depriving Tamil and Muslim farming communities downstream of life-sustaining water.
2006	26 July	Eelam War IV begins as a result of the closure of Mavil Aru.
2007	3 December	Sri Lankan bowler Muttiah Muralitharan dismisses Paul Collingwood in Kandy to take his 709th Test wicket, permanently surpassing Shane Warne as the most successful Test bowler of all time.
2008	6 July	Sri Lanka wins the Asia Cup cricket tournament in Karachi, Pakistan, defeating India by 100 runs in the final.
2009	17 May	The Liberation Tigers of Tamil Eelam conceded defeat and announced their plan to surrender.
2009	18 May	The conclusion of the war drew heavy international scrutiny, with a UN Panel of Experts finding credible evidence that both the Sri Lankan armed forces and the LTTE committed serious violations of international humanitarian law, especially during the final stages.
2009	18 May	LTTE leader Velupillai Prabhakaran, his intelligence chief Pottu Amman and Soosai, the head of the LTTE naval wing, were killed in an ambush with the Sri Lankan military during an intense, multi-hour firefight while attempting to escape the war zone in an ambulance.
2009	19 May	The Sri Lankan government declares an end to the Sri Lankan civil war following a sweeping military victory by government forces over the separatist Liberation Tigers of Tamil Eelam (LTTE). The final, intense phase of the 26-year conflict culminated in the northern coastal village of Mullivaikkal, where the LTTE's leadership was defeated
2010	15 January	An annular solar eclipse is visible over Jaffna and Anuradhapura.
2010		In Northern California, 4 novice nuns were given the full bhikkhuni ordination in the Thai Theravada tradition, which included the double ordination ceremony. Bhante Gunaratana and other monks and nuns were in attendance. It was the first such ordination ever in the Western hemisphere. The following month, more bhikkhuni ordinations were completed in Southern California, led by Walpola Piyananda and other monks and nuns. The bhikkhunis ordained in Southern California were Lakshapathiye Samadhi (born in Sri Lanka), Cariyapanna, Susila, Sammasati (all three born in Vietnam), and Uttamanyana (born in Myanmar).
2010	22 July	On his final delivery of his Test career, Muttiah Muralitharan dismisses Pragyan Ojha to reach a milestone of 800 Test wickets, a world record that remains unbroken.
2010	9 September	Eighteenth Amendment to the 1978 Constitution is enacted, abolishing presidential term limits and repealing the Constitutional Council.
2011	27 November	Sri Lanka inaugurates the Southern Expressway, the country's first-ever access-controlled toll highway, linking the capital with the southern coast while reducing travel times.
2012	20 March	The 14th national Census of Sri Lanka was the first complete island-wide count in 31 years following the end of the civil war. It enumarated a population of 20,359,439 people.
2012	27 November	Sri Lanka successfully launches its first communication satellite, SupremeSAT-1, into orbit from the Xichang Satellite Launch Center.
2013	15–17 November	The Commonwealth Heads of Government Meeting (CHOGM) was held in Colombo.
2013	21 September	Provincial Council elections are held, including in the Northern Province for the first time in 25 years.
2014	6 April	Sri Lanka wins the ICC World Twenty20 tournament in Dhaka, Bangladesh, defeating India by 6 wickets in the final.
2015	9 January	Senior figures from the Sirisena campaign alleged that, as initial vote counts made it clear he was losing, Mahinda Rajapaksa attempted to stage a coup d'état to remain in power.
2015	15 May	Nineteenth Amendment to the 1978 Constitution is enacted, restoring independent commissions, re-establishing presidential term limits, and reducing executive power.
2016	5 September	The World Health Organization certifies Sri Lanka as malaria-free, making the country one of the first in the region to eliminate the disease.
2017	9 December	The Sri Lankan government gave China Merchants Ports a controlling equity stake and a 99-year lease for the Hambantota International Port after it is unable to repay its debt to the Chinese government.
2018	26 October	President Maithripala Sirisena abruptly dismissed Prime Minister Ranil Wickremesinghe starting a 52-day constitutional crisis. Sirisena illegally replaced him with former President Mahinda Rajapaksa.
2019	21 April	Bombing of several churches and hotels by Islamic militants causing 269 deaths
2019	21 April	Beginning of the Sri Lankan economic crisis (2019–2024)
2019	26 December	An annular solar eclipse is visible over Jaffna.
2020	25 January	The first reported case of COVID-19 in Sri Lanka was identified and the victim was reported to be a Chinese woman.
2020	28 June	Former Sri Lankan cricketer Muttiah Muralitharan is named as the Most Valuable Test Player of the 21st Century by the Wisden Cricket Monthly magazine.
2020	5 August	The 2020 Sri Lankan parliamentary elections were held. The incumbent Sri Lanka People's Freedom Alliance (led by the Sri Lanka Podujana Peramuna) won a landslide victory, claiming 145 seats and winning a two-thirds majority in the Parliament of Sri Lanka.
2020	11 August	2020 Sri Lankan parliamentary election: Mahinda Rajapaksa is officially sworn in as the 13th Prime Minister of Sri Lanka at Temple Trees.
2020	22 October	Twentieth Amendment to the 1978 Constitution is enacted, centralizing authority back into the Executive Presidency.
2021	5 April	Driven by foreign exchange shortages, President Gotabaya Rajapaksa orders the immediately suspension palm oil imports to Sri Lanka to push for organic farming. This decision backfired drastically, causing widespread crop failures, soaring food inflation, and critical shortages of essential goods.
2021	30 August	Dinesh Priyantha Herath clinches a historic gold medal for Sri Lanka in the men's javelin throw F46 category with a new world record of 67.79 m, claiming Sri Lanka's first ever paralympic gold medal and also securing Sri Lanka's first medal at the 2020 Tokyo Paralympics.
2021	6 December	Total number of COVID-19 deaths in Sri Lanka exceeds 14,500 with 21 more deaths.
2021	15 December	Sri Lanka's traditional craftsmanship of making "Dumbara Ratā Kalāla" (Dumbara Weaving) is recognized by the UNESCO World Cultural Heritage.
2022	15 March	Aragalaya: Protests erupt against the government's mishandling of the economic crisis
2022	31 March	Aragalaya: Hundreds of protesters storm the residence of President Gotabaya Rajapaksa in Mirihana to protest against the government's poor handling of the economy, leading to shortages of fuel and power cuts that had reached over 12-hours a day.
2022	1 April	Aragalaya: President Gotabaya Rajapaksa declares a State of Emergency in Sri Lanka, in effect from 1 April 2022.
2022	3 April	Aragalaya: All 26 cabinet ministers resign en masse except for Prime Minister Mahinda Rajapaksa.
2022	7 April	Aragalaya: Nandalal Weerasinghe is appointed as the new Governor of the Central Bank of Sri Lanka.
2022	9 April	Aragalaya: Tens of thousands of anti-government protestors occupy Galle Face Green in Colombo, in one of the largest street protests in the country's history, and rename the protesting area as "Gotagogama".
2022	11 April	Sri Lankan actor Hiran Abeysekera wins the award for Best Actor at the Laurence Olivier Awards, held at the Royal Albert Hall in London, for his performance as the main protagonist in the West-End play 'Life of Pi'.
2022	25 April	Yupun Abeykoon sets a new Asian record in the 150 meters men's event at an athletic meet held in Italy, where the sprinter clocked a time of 15.16 seconds to finish first place in the race.
2022	9 May	Aragalaya: Mahinda Rajapaksa resigns from his post as Prime Minister amidst violent clashes and the worsening economic crisis. Rajapaksa loyalists stage a violent assault against anti-government protesters at the GotaGoGama protest site.
2022	12 May	Aragalaya: Ranil Wickremesinghe is sworn in as the new Prime Minister. Saman Ekanayake is appointed as the secretary to Prime Minister.
2022	13 June	The government officially lifts the colonial-era ban on the traditional, indigenous martial art of Angampora, restoring national pride, preserving heritage, and promoting cultural arts.
2022	21 June	Sri Lankan economic crisis (2019–2024): The overall rate of inflation as measured by the National Consumer Price Index on Year-on-Year basis reaches a record high of 45.3% in May 2022.
2022	9 July	Aragalaya: Hundreds of thousands of protesters breach the President's official residence and set fire to the Prime Minister's private residence in Colombo. Protesters claimed they would occupy the President's House until both the President and Prime Minister resign. President Gotabaya Rajapaksa announces he will resign on 13 July and Prime Minister Ranil Wickremesinghe announces his intention to resign once a new all-party government is formed.
2022	13 July	Aragalaya: Despite his initial announcement, President Gotabaya Rajapaksa does not resign on the 13th as originally pledged. Instead Rajapaksa flees the country via military aircraft for the Maldives and appoints Prime Minister Ranil Wickremesinghe as Acting President to exercise Presidential duties during his absence. In reaction to this appointment, protesters storm the office of the Prime Minister demanding Acting President Ranil Wickremesinghe's resignation. In the evening, protesters reportedly attempted to breach the police barricades placed along the road leading to the Parliament. Wickremesinghe declared an island wide curfew until 5:00 am the next day.
2022	14 July	Aragalaya: President Gotabaya Rajapaksa emails his resignation letter to the Speaker of the Parliament after fleeing to Singapore, officially ending his presidency.
2022	20 July	Aragalaya: Ranil Wickremesinghe is elected as President of Sri Lanka by the Parliament, following the resignation of Gotabaya Rajapaksa. The following day, Wickremesinghe is sworn in as the 9th President of Sri Lanka.
2022	22 July	Aragalaya: Dinesh Gunawardena is sworn as the new prime minister of Sri Lanka, and a new cabinet consisting of 18 ministers is appointed by the president.
2022	10 August	Aragalaya: Protesters vacate Galle Face Green and Gotagogama, after occupying the premises for 124 days.
2022	2 September	Aragalaya: Former President Gotabaya Rajapaksa returns to Sri Lanka after a 52-day self-exile.
2022	17 October	Sri Lankan writer Shehan Karunatilaka wins the 2022 Booker Prize for his novel The Seven Moons of Maali Almeida. He is the second Sri Lankan to win the prize.
2022	21 October	The 21st Amendment to the Constitution of Sri Lanka is enacted following the 2022 Sri Lankan political crisis, curtailing executive presidential powers and banning dual citizens from holding parliamentary office..
2022	14 November	Protests of the Aragalaya ends.
2023	4 June	Sri Lanka is unanimously elected as a vice president of the 78th session of the United Nations General Assembly which will assume the relevant position for the Asia Pacific region from September 2023 to September 2024.
2023	27 June	The Mahāvaṃsa is listed among the 64 new items of documentary heritage inscribed on the UNESCO's Memory of the World International Register in 2023.
2023	29 July	President of France Emmanuel Macron visits Sri Lanka during a series of visits to the South Pacific Region. It is the first instance in history where a French president has visited the country.
2024	24 February	Red Sea crisis: The Sri Lanka Navy confirms that one of its ships has completed its maiden patrol in the Bab-el-Mandeb Strait and is set to return to the country. The vessel is later revealed to be SLNS Gajabahu and the Sri Lankan government confirms that patrols would continue.
2024	16 July	Sri Lankan-born award-winning celebrity baker Tharshan Selvarajah becomes the first Sri Lankan to carry the Olympic Torch, carrying it out at the 2024 Paris Olympics.
2024	3 September	2024 Summer Paralympics: Dulan Kodithuwakku wins Silver in the Men's Javelin Throw (F64) event with a personal best distance of 67.03 meters and also broke his own previous World Record (66.49m) in the process in the F44 category.
2024	21 September	2024 Sri Lankan presidential election: Over 17 million voters elect a new president. NPP candidate Anura Kumara Dissanayake wins a plurality of the vote with 42.31%, followed by Leader of the Opposition Sajith Premadasa with 32.76%. No candidate wins a majority in the first round, forcing a second round of vote counting for the first time in Sri Lanka's history.
2024	22 September	2024 Sri Lankan presidential election: The second round concludes, with NPP candidate Anura Kumara Dissanayake being declared as president-elect of Sri Lanka. Dissanayake receives 55.89% of votes, defeating Sajith Premadasa with 44.11%.
2024	23 September	Anura Kumara Dissanayake is inaugurated as the 10th President of Sri Lanka.
2024	24 September	President Dissanayake appoints MP Harini Amarasuriya as Prime Minister of Sri Lanka and swears in a new three-member cabinet. Amarasuriya is the third woman to hold the position. President Dissanayake dissolves the current Parliament of Sri Lanka and calls for snap parliamentary elections in November 2024.
2024	14 November	2024 Sri Lankan parliamentary election: The ruling National People's Power wins in a landslide victory, winning 61.56% of the popular vote and securing 159 seats, the most seats won by a single party in an election. The NPP becomes the first party to win a supermajority in parliament since 1977 and the first non-Tamil party to win the Jaffna district.
2024	19 December	Delayed from its planned 2021 date by the COVID-19 pandemic, the 15th national census officially commenced in late 2023 and concluded its data collection in early 2024. The 15th national Census of Sri Lanka enumarates a population of 21,781,800 people.
2025	10 April	The Vasavilan–Palaly road is officially reopened to the public, after being closed for 34 years due to the Sri Lankan civil war.
2025	18 April	A special exposition of the Sacred Tooth Relic, titled “Siri Dalada Wandanawa”, begins at the Temple of the Tooth in Kandy. The exposition would go on for 10 days.
2025	27 July	Padman Surasena is appointed as the 49th Chief Justice of Sri Lanka by President Dissanayake with the consent of the Constitutional Council.
2025	8 August	Yevan David signs with AIX Racing to compete in the 2026 FIA Formula 3 Championship, becoming the first Sri Lankan to compete in the series.
2025	26–30 November	Cyclone Ditwah causes severe devastation across Sri Lanka, with heavy rainfall triggering flooding and landslides that leave at least 639 people dead and 203 missing.
2025	11 December	The Sri Lankan kithul tapping industry is officially inscribed on UNESCO's Representative List of the Intangible Cultural Heritage of Humanity.
2026	5 February	Samudika Jayarathna is appointed as the 42nd Auditor General of Sri Lanka, becoming the first woman to hold the post.
2026	4 March	A United States Navy submarine sinks the Iranian Navy frigate IRIS Dena, approximately 40 nautical miles (74 km; 46 mi) off the southern coast of Sri Lanka, outside the territorial waters but within the exclusive economic zone, in an event related to the 2026 Iran war. The Sri Lanka Navy rescues 32 survivors from the crew of 180 and recover 87 bodies, with about 60 sailors still unaccounted for. The submarine which was involved in the engagement is later identified as USS Charlotte.

=== Future ===
Year	Date	Event
2031	21 May	An annular solar eclipse is projected to pass over Jaffna.
2048	4 February	Centenary of Sri Lankan independence from British rule.
2070	11 April	A total solar eclipse is projected to pass over Galle.
2074	27 January	An annular solar eclipse is projected to pass over Kandy and Colombo.
