= 1997 in Sri Lanka =

- Decades: 1970s; 1980s; 1990s; 2000s; 2010s
- See also: Other events of 1997; Timeline of Sri Lankan history

The following lists events that happened during 1997 in Sri Lanka.

== Incumbents ==
- President: Chandrika Kumaratunga
- Prime Minister: Sirimavo Bandaranaike
- Chief Justice: G. P. S. de Silva

=== Governors ===
- Central Province – E. L. Senanayake
- North Central Province – Maithripala Senanayake
- North Eastern Province – Gamini Fonseka
- North Western Province – Hector Arawwawala
- Sabaragamuwa Province – C. N. Saliya Mathew
- Southern Province – Neville Kanakeratne
- Uva Province – Ananda Dassanayake
- Western Province – K. Vignarajah

=== Chief Ministers ===
- Central Province – W. M. P. B. Dissanayake
- North Central Province – Jayasena Dissanayake
- North Western Province – Nimal Bandara
- Sabaragamuwa Province – Jayatilake Podinilame
- Southern Province – Mahinda Yapa Abeywardena
- Uva Province – Percy Samaraweera
- Western Province – Susil Premajayanth

== Events ==
- Sri Lankan Civil War
  - Eelam War III
  - Operation Jayasikurui
- 13 May – The Sri Lankan Army unleashes Operation Jayasikurui, marking the beginning of a long military campaign which would last for almost 2 years.
- 10–25 June – The Liberation Tigers of Tamil Eelam launches a series of attacks, marking the start of the Thandikulam–Omanthai offensive. The towns of Thandikulam and Omanthai fall to the hands of the LTTE, marking the second significant loss for the Sri Lankan Army.

== Notes ==
a. Gunaratna, Rohan. (1998). Pg.353, Sri Lanka's Ethnic Crisis and National Security, Colombo: South Asian Network on Conflict Research. ISBN 955-8093-00-9
