= 1998 in Sri Lanka =

- Decades: 1970s; 1980s; 1990s; 2000s; 2010s
- See also: Other events of 1998; Timeline of Sri Lankan history

The following lists events that happened during 1998 in Sri Lanka.

== Incumbents ==
- President: Chandrika Kumaratunga
- Prime Minister: Sirimavo Bandaranaike
- Chief Justice: G. P. S. de Silva

=== Governors ===
- Central Province – E. L. Senanayake (until 1998); Stanley Tillekeratne (starting 1998)
- North Central Province – Maithripala Senanayake (until 12 July); G. M. S. Samaraweera (starting 12 July)
- North Eastern Province – Gamini Fonseka (until 20 October); Asoka Jayawardena (starting 20 October)
- North Western Province – Hector Arawwawala
- Sabaragamuwa Province – C. N. Saliya Mathew
- Southern Province – Neville Kanakeratne
- Uva Province – Ananda Dassanayake
- Western Province – K. Vignarajah

=== Chief Ministers ===
- Central Province – W. M. P. B. Dissanayake (until 1998); vacant (starting 1998)
- North Central Province – Jayasena Dissanayake (until June); vacant (starting June)
- North Western Province – Nimal Bandara
- Sabaragamuwa Province – Jayatilake Podinilame (until June); Vacant (starting June)
- Southern Province – Mahinda Yapa Abeywardena
- Uva Province – Percy Samaraweera (until June); vacant (starting June)
- Western Province – Susil Premajayanth (until June); vacant (starting June)

== Events ==
- Sri Lankan Civil War
  - Eelam War III
  - Operation Jayasikurui
- 29 January – 1998 Sri Lankan local elections: Local government elections are held in Sri Lanka for 17 local authorities in the Jaffna Peninsula, in the north of the country.
- 27–29 September – Bolstered by its successes in 1997, the Liberation Tigers of Tamil Eelam unleashes Operation Unceasing Waves II. The LTTE captures the town of Killinochi in the northeast, but loses Mankulam to the Sri Lankan Army.

== Notes ==
a. Gunaratna, Rohan. (1998). Pg.353, Sri Lanka's Ethnic Crisis and National Security, Colombo: South Asian Network on Conflict Research. ISBN 955-8093-00-9
