= 1993 in Sri Lanka =

- Decades: 1970s; 1980s; 1990s; 2000s; 2010s
- See also: Other events of 1993; Timeline of Sri Lankan history

The following lists events that happened during 1993 in Sri Lanka.

== Incumbents ==
- President: Ranasinghe Premadasa (until 1 May); Dingiri Banda Wijetunga (starting 1 May)
- Prime Minister: Dingiri Banda Wijetunga (until 7 May); Ranil Wickremesinghe (starting 7 May)
- Chief Justice: G. P. S. de Silva

=== Governors ===
- Central Province – P. C. Imbulana (until May); E. L. Senanayake (starting May)
- North Central Province – E. L. Senanayake
- North Eastern Province – Nalin Seneviratne (until 30 November); Lionel Fernando (starting 30 November)
- North Western Province – Montague Jayawickrama (until 13 October); Karunasena Kodituwakku (starting 13 October)
- Sabaragamuwa Province – Noel Wimalasena (until 1993); C. N. Saliya Mathew (starting 1993)
- Southern Province – Abdul Bakeer Markar (until December); Leslie Mervyn Jayaratne (starting December)
- Uva Province – Tilak Ratnayake (until March); Abeyratne Pilapitiya (starting March)
- Western Province – Suppiah Sharvananda

=== Chief Ministers ===
- Central Province – W. M. P. B. Dissanayake
- North Central Province – G. D. Mahindasoma
- North Western Province – Gamini Jayawickrama Perera (until 19 October); G. M. Premachandra (starting 19 October)
- Sabaragamuwa Province – Abeyratne Pilapitiya (until March); Jayatilake Podinilame (starting March)
- Southern Province – M. S. Amarasiri (until October); Amarasiri Dodangoda (starting October)
- Uva Province – Percy Samaraweera
- Western Province – Susil Moonesinghe (until 16 March); Chandrika Kumaratunga (starting 21 May)

== Events ==
- 2 January – Jaffna lagoon massacre: A Sri Lankan Navy motor gunboat and a number of smaller speedboats intercept a number of boats transporting people between the southern and northern shores of the Jaffna Lagoon, and attacked them under the glare of a spotlight. Roughly 100 civilians and militants were killed.
- 23 April – Assassination of Lalith Athulathmudali: Former Cabinet Minister of Trade, National Security, Agriculture, Education and Deputy Minister of Defence Lalith Athulathmudali is assassinated at 8:10 p.m. Sri Lanka Time (2.10 p.m. UTC) in Kirulapana. At the time, the rebel LTTE was blamed, however a presidential commission appointed by future president Chandrika Kumaratunga revealed that President Ranasinghe Premadasa had direct involvement in the assassination.
- 1 May – Assassination of Ranasinghe Premadasa: President Ranasinghe Premadasa is assassinated during a May Day rally by an LTTE suicide bomber. Prime Minister Dingiri Banda Wijetunga is sworn in as acting president of Sri Lanka.
- 7 May – 1993 Sri Lankan presidential election: Dingiri Banda Wijetunga is unanimously elected as the 4th President of Sri Lanka by the Parliament.
- 11–14 November – The Battle of Pooneryn is fought between the Sri Lankan military and the LTTE for the town of Pooneryn. Although the LTTE was forced to withdraw from the town, it still inflicted considerable damage to the military.

== Notes ==
a. Gunaratna, Rohan. (1998). Pg.353, Sri Lanka's Ethnic Crisis and National Security, Colombo: South Asian Network on Conflict Research. ISBN 955-8093-00-9
