= 1994 in Sri Lanka =

- Decades: 1970s; 1980s; 1990s; 2000s; 2010s
- See also: Other events of 1994; Timeline of Sri Lankan history

The following lists events that happened during 1994 in Sri Lanka.

== Incumbents ==
- President: Dingiri Banda Wijetunga (until 9 November); Chandrika Kumaratunga (starting 9 November).
- Prime Minister:
  - until 19 August: Ranil Wickremesinghe
  - 19 August–12 November: Chandrika Kumaratunga
  - 12–14 November: vacant
  - starting 14 November: Sirimavo Bandaranaike
- Chief Justice: G. P. S. de Silva

=== Governors ===
- Central Province – P. C. Imbulana (until May) E. L. Senanayake (starting May)
- North Central Province –
  - until May: E. L. Senanayake
  - May-September: E. L. B. Hurulle
  - starting September: Maithripala Senanayake
- North Eastern Province – Lionel Fernando (until 23 August); vacant thereafter (starting 23 August)
- North Western Province – Karunasena Kodituwakku (until 7 July); Anandatissa de Alwis (starting 7 July)
- Sabaragamuwa Province – C. N. Saliya Mathew
- Southern Province – Leslie Mervyn Jayaratne
- Uva Province – Abeyratne Pilapitiya (until December); vacant (starting December)
- Western Province –
  - until 10 June: Suppiah Sharvananda
  - 11 July-1 December: Deva Swaminathan
  - starting 1 December: vacant

=== Chief Ministers ===
- Central Province – W. M. P. B. Dissanayake
- North Central Province – G. D. Mahindasoma
- North Western Province – G. M. Premachandra (until 27 August); G. M. Premachandra (starting 27 August)
- Sabaragamuwa Province – Jayatilake Podinilame
- Southern Province –
  - until January: Amarasiri Dodangoda
  - January-March: Vacant
  - March-September: Amarasiri Dodangoda
  - starting September: Mahinda Yapa Abeywardena
- Uva Province – Percy Samaraweera
- Western Province – Chandrika Kumaratunga (until 21 August); Morris Rajapaksa (starting 21 August)

== Events ==
- Sri Lankan Civil War
  - Eelam War II
- 16 August – 1994 Sri Lankan parliamentary election: The People's Alliance led by Chandrika Kumaratunga wins 105 seats, thus making it the largest party in the Parliament and bringing a decisive end to 17 years of United National Party rule.
- 19 August – PA leader Chandrika Kumaratunga is sworn in as the new prime minister of Sri Lanka.
- 24 October – Several hardline UNP members are killed in a suicide bombing by the LTTE in Thotalanga. Among those killed includes UNP presidential candidate and Opposition Leader Gamini Dissanayake, former UNP cabinet ministers Weerasinghe Mallimarachchi and G. M. Premachandra, and UNP MP Ossie Abeygunasekara.
  - Following his assassination, Dissanayake's wife Srima Dissanayake is appointed as the UNP candidate for the 1994 elections.
- 9 November – 1994 Sri Lankan presidential election: Prime Minister Chandrika Kumaratunga is elected president, winning 62% of all votes cast. She is the first female and first non-UNP executive president of the country.

== Notes ==
a. Gunaratna, Rohan. (1998). Pg.353, Sri Lanka's Ethnic Crisis and National Security, Colombo: South Asian Network on Conflict Research. ISBN 955-8093-00-9
