= 1999 in Sri Lanka =

- Decades: 1970s; 1980s; 1990s; 2000s; 2010s
- See also: Other events of 1999; Timeline of Sri Lankan history

The following lists events that happened during 1999 in Sri Lanka.

== Incumbents ==
- President: Chandrika Kumaratunga
- Prime Minister: Sirimavo Bandaranaike
- Chief Justice: G. P. S. de Silva then Sarath N. Silva

=== Governors ===
- Central Province – Stanley Tillekeratne
- North Central Province – G. M. S. Samaraweera
- North Eastern Province – Asoka Jayawardena
- North Western Province – Hector Arawwawala (until 3 January); Siripala Jayaweera (starting 3 January)
- Sabaragamuwa Province – C. N. Saliya Mathew
- Southern Province – Neville Kanakeratne (until 20 September); Ananda Dassanayake (starting 20 September)
- Uva Province – Ananda Dassanayake (until 1999); Sirisena Amarasiri (starting 1999)
- Western Province – K. Vignarajah

=== Chief Ministers ===
- Central Province –
  - until April: Vacant
  - April-June: Sarath Ekanayake
  - starting June: Nandimithra Ekanayake
- North Central Province – vacant (until June); Berty Premalal Dissanayake (starting June)
- North Western Province – Nimal Bandara (until 28 January); S. B. Nawinne (starting 28 January)
- Sabaragamuwa Province –
  - until April: Vacant
  - April-June: Kantha Gunatilleke
  - starting June: Athauda Seneviratne
- Southern Province – Mahinda Yapa Abeywardena
- Uva Province –
  - until April: Vacant
  - April: Nalini Weerawanni
  - starting April: Samaraweera Weerawanni
- Western Province – vacant (until June); Susil Premajayanth (starting June)

== Events ==
- Sri Lankan Civil War
  - Eelam War III
- October–November – The Oddusuddan offensive takes place. It was a military operation in which the LTTE captured the town of Oddusuddan from the Sri Lankan Army. The LTTE were believed to have captured large amounts of weapons and ammunitions as well as armoured vehicles in this operation.
- 20 November – Madhu church shelling: the Shrine of Our Lady of Madhu is subject to severe shelling following fighting between the LTTE and the Sri Lanka Army. The shelling resulted in approximately 40 deaths and 60 injuries.
- 18 December – President Chandrika Kumaratunga barely survives an assassination attempt by the LTTE in Colombo.
- 29 December – 1999 Sri Lankan presidential election: Incumbent President Chandrika Kumaratunga is reelected, winning by a 51.12% margin amidst several assassination attempts prior to the election.

== Notes ==
a. Gunaratna, Rohan. (1998). Pg.353, Sri Lanka's Ethnic Crisis and National Security, Colombo: South Asian Network on Conflict Research. ISBN 955-8093-00-9
