= 1991 in Sri Lanka =

- Decades: 1970s; 1980s; 1990s; 2000s; 2010s
- See also: Other events of 1991; Timeline of Sri Lankan history

The following lists events that happened during 1991 in Sri Lanka.

== Incumbents ==
- President: Ranasinghe Premadasa
- Prime Minister: Dingiri Banda Wijetunga
- Chief Justice: Parinda Ranasinghe then Herbert Thambiah then G. P. S. de Silva

=== Governors ===
- Central Province – P. C. Imbulana
- North Central Province – E. L. Senanayake
- North Eastern Province – Nalin Seneviratne
- North Western Province – Montague Jayawickrama
- Sabaragamuwa Province – Noel Wimalasena
- Southern Province – Leslie Mervyn Jayaratne
- Uva Province – Abeyratne Pilapitiya
- Western Province – Suppiah Sharvananda

=== Chief Ministers ===
- Central Province – W. M. P. B. Dissanayake
- North Central Province – G. D. Mahindasoma
- North Western Province – Gamini Jayawickrama Perera
- Sabaragamuwa Province – Abeyratne Pilapitiya
- Southern Province – M. S. Amarasiri
- Uva Province – Percy Samaraweera
- Western Province – Susil Moonesinghe

== Events ==
- Sri Lankan Civil War
  - Eelam War II
- 10 July–9 August – The First Battle of Elephant Pass took was fought between the Sri Lankan army and the LTTE over control of the Sri Lankan military base of Elephant Pass, which was of strategic importance as it connected to the northern mainland of Vanni with the Jaffna Peninsula.
- 2 March – Havelock Road bombing: UNP Minister of Defense Ranjan Wijeratne is killed in a car bombing. The LTTE is allegedly responsible for the attack.
- The South Asian Games are held in Colombo.

== Notes ==
a. Gunaratna, Rohan. (1998). Pg.353, Sri Lanka's Ethnic Crisis and National Security, Colombo: South Asian Network on Conflict Research. ISBN 955-8093-00-9
