= 1992 in Sri Lanka =

- Decades: 1970s; 1980s; 1990s; 2000s; 2010s
- See also: Other events of 1992; Timeline of Sri Lankan history

The following lists events that happened during 1992 in Sri Lanka.

== Incumbents ==
- President: Ranasinghe Premadasa
- Prime Minister: Dingiri Banda Wijetunga
- Chief Justice: G. P. S. de Silva

=== Governors ===
- Central Province – P. C. Imbulana
- North Central Province – E. L. Senanayake
- North Eastern Province – Nalin Seneviratne
- North Western Province – Montague Jayawickrama
- Sabaragamuwa Province – Noel Wimalasena
- Southern Province – Leslie Mervyn Jayaratne
- Uva Province – Abeyratne Pilapitiya
- Western Province – Suppiah Sharvananda

=== Chief Ministers ===
- Central Province – W. M. P. B. Dissanayake
- North Central Province – G. D. Mahindasoma
- North Western Province – Gamini Jayawickrama Perera
- Sabaragamuwa Province – Abeyratne Pilapitiya
- Southern Province – M. S. Amarasiri
- Uva Province – Percy Samaraweera
- Western Province – Susil Moonesinghe

== Events ==
- Sri Lankan Civil War
  - Eelam War II
- 29 April – A series of attacks on civilians occur in the villages of Alanchipothana, Karapola, Madurangala and Muthugal in the eastern Polonnaruwa District, killing 157.
- 9 August – Mylanthanai massacre: 35 Sri Lankan Tamils, including 14 children, are killed in the village of Mylanthanai in the Batticaloa District. The rest of the village's population is displaced, and to this day the town remains a ghost town.

== Notes ==
a. Gunaratna, Rohan. (1998). Pg.353, Sri Lanka's Ethnic Crisis and National Security, Colombo: South Asian Network on Conflict Research. ISBN 955-8093-00-9
