= Kantha Gunatilleke =

Sri Lankan politician

4th Chief Minister of Sabaragamuwa
- In office April 1999 – June 1999
- Governor: C. N. Saliya Mathew
- Preceded by: Vacant; Jayatilake Podinilame
- Succeeded by: Athauda Seneviratne

Personal details
- Party: People's Alliance

Kantha Gunatilleke was the 4th Chief Minister of Sabaragamuwa. He was appointed in April 1999 succeeding Jayatilake Podinilame and was Chief Minister until June 1999. He was succeeded by Athauda Seneviratne.

Political offices
Preceded by Vacant; Jayatilake Podinilame	Chief Minister of Sabaragamuwa; 1999	Succeeded by Athauda Seneviratne
