= P. Ramanathan (judge) =

Sri Lankan judge (1932–2006)

Puisne Justice of the Supreme Court of Sri Lanka

4th Governor, Western Province
- In office 21 January 2000 – 1 February 2002
- Preceded by: K. Vignarajah
- Succeeded by: Alavi Moulana

1st Chancellor, Uva Wellassa University
- In office 27 July 2005 – 7 December 2006

Personal details
- Born: 1 September 1932
- Died: 7 December 2006 (aged 74)
- Spouse(s): Mano Ramanathan (née Saravanamuttu)
- Education: St. Joseph's College, Colombo; Montfort School; St David's College
- Profession: Lawyer

Pathmanathan Ramanathan (1 September 1932 – 7 December 2006) was a leading Sri Lankan Tamil lawyer and judge. Known as Rama, he was a High Court judge, Court of Appeal judge, provincial governor, university chancellor and a judge of the Supreme Court of Sri Lanka.

== Early life and family ==
Ramanathan was born on 1 September 1932. He was the son of Sangarapillai Pathmanathan, a broker and chairman of the Low-Country Products Association, and Srimani, grand daughter of Ponnambalam Ramanathan, a leading politician during British colonial rule. Ramanathan was educated at St. Joseph's College, Colombo and Montford High School in southern India. He was a keen sportsman. After school Ramanathan went to the UK and studied at the St David's College, University of Wales and Gray's Inn. Whilst in the UK he lived in London House, a hall of residence for Commonwealth students. There he formed lifelong friendships with Sinha Basnayake, Desmond Fernando, Dr. Tony Gabriel, Palitha Kirthisinghe, Ajit Jayaratne, Dr. Lal Jayawardena, Dr. Mano Muttucumaru and Dr. Gihan Tennekoon.

Ramanathan married Mano, daughter of Suppiah Saravanamuttu, a lawyer from Colombo.

== Career ==
Ramanathan worked for the British Inland Revenue for a while before returning to Ceylon. He became an advocate of the Supreme Court and practised law. He joined the Attorney-General's Department in the late 1970s as a crown counsel. He was appointed to the High Court in 1978 and served in Matara, Anuradhapura, Kurunegala and Colombo. In 1985 he was appointed to the Court of Appeal. He was later promoted to President of the Court of Appeal. He was then appointed to the Supreme Court.

Ramanathan was elected Master of the Bench by Gray's Inn. He was also president of the British Scholars' Association, president of the Medical-Legal Society, member of the council of the Indo-Pacific Association of Law and Medicine and a member of the Permanent Court of Arbitration in The Hague. Ramanathan was awarded the Deshamanya title, the second highest civilian honour in Sri Lanka, by President Chandrika Kumaratunga.

== Later life ==
After retiring from the Supreme Court Ramanathan was appointed the 4th governor of the Western Province in 2000. He was appointed chancellor of the new Uva Wellassa University in July 2005. He was also chairman of the Human Rights Commission of Sri Lanka and trustee of several religious organisations including Sri Ponnambalam Vaneswarar Kovil in Colombo.

Ramanathan was a member of the kennel club and regularly displayed his dogs at shows. One of his dachshunds won the "Champion of Champions" title at a dog show in Kandy in the 1990s. He was also a Rotarian and a Freemason.

Ramanathan died on 7 December 2006.

Political offices
Preceded by K. Vignarajah	Governor of Western Province; 2000–2002	Succeeded by Alavi Moulana
