= Mahanama =

Mahanama may refer to

- Mahanama (arhat), with Kaundinya, an early follower of Gautama Buddha
- Mahanama, father of Amrapali (c. 6th-century BC), the ancient Indian courtesan and follower of Gautama Buddha
- Mahanama of Anuradhapura (fl. 412–434), King of Anuradhapura
- Mahānāma, fifth century CE, author of the Mahāvaṃsa
- Bibiladeniye Mahanama (born 1989), Buddhist monk and composer
- Roshan Mahanama (born 1966), Sri Lankan cricketer
- Shantha Bandara (1951–1990), alias Mahanama, Sri Lankan politician
- Mahanama College in Colombo

== See also ==
- "Mah Nà Mah Nà", a popular song
