= Parinda Ranasinghe =

Chief Justice of Sri Lanka from 1988 to 1991

38th Chief Justice of Sri Lanka
- In office 1988–1991
- Appointed by: J. R. Jayewardene
- Preceded by: Suppiah Sharvananda
- Succeeded by: Herbert Thambiah

Personal details
- Education: Colombo Law College

K. A. Parinda Ranasinghe was a Sri Lankan, judge, who was the 38th Chief Justice of the Supreme Court of Ceylon. He is also the President of the Asia Crime Prevention Foundation.

Educated at Royal College Colombo, Ranasinghe went on to study law at the Colombo Law College passing out as a lawyer. Thereafter he joined the judicial service. He was succeeded by Herbert Thambiah.

Legal offices
Preceded by Suppiah Sharvananda	Chief Justice of Sri Lanka; 1988–1991	Succeeded by Herbert Thambiah
