= Herbert Thambiah =

Chief Justice of Sri Lanka in 1991

39th Chief Justice of Sri Lanka
- In office 1991–1991
- Appointed by: Ranasinghe Premadasa
- Preceded by: Parinda Ranasinghe
- Succeeded by: G. P. S. de Silva

Puisne Justice of the Supreme Court of Sri Lanka
- In office 1984–1992

Personal details
- Born: 14 October 1926
- Died: 4 October 1992 (aged 65)
- Education: Ceylon Law College; University of Ceylon
- Profession: Lawyer
- Ethnicity: Sri Lankan Tamil

Herbert Dharmarajah Thambiah (14 October 1926 – 4 October 1992) was a Sri Lankan lawyer and judge. He was a Court of Appeal judge, Supreme Court judge and the 39th Chief Justice of Sri Lanka.

== Early life and family ==
Thambiah was born on 14 October 1926. He was the son of C. R. Thambiah, a lawyer from Jaffna in northern Ceylon. He was educated at Jaffna Central College and St. Thomas' College, Colombo. After school he entered University of Ceylon and graduated with an honours degree in economics. He taught at Hartley College for a period. He then entered Ceylon Law College, obtaining a first class in the final examinations. He became an advocate in 1954.

Thambiah married Ranji Appathuari. They had one daughter - Savithri.

== Career ==
After qualifying Thambiah practised law for a while before joining the judicial service. He rose up the ranks and became a Court of Appeal judge in 1978 and Supreme Court judge in 1984. He was appointed Chief Justice in 1991. He was succeeded by G. P. S. de Silva.

Thambiah died on 4 October 1992 at the age of 65.

Legal offices
Preceded by Parinda Ranasinghe	Chief Justice of Sri Lanka; 1991	Succeeded by G. P. S. de Silva
