= G. M. Premachandra =

Sri Lankan politician and statesman

Hon. G. M. Premachandra

Former Cabinet Minister of Labour and Vocational Training

Member of Parliament for Kurunegala District
- In office 25 August 1994 – 24 October 1994

Personal details
- Born: 24 August 1940 Sri Lanka
- Died: 24 October 1994 (aged 54) Thotalanga, Grandpass, Sri Lanka
- Manner of death: Assassination by suicide bomb attack
- Party: United National Party

Gamlath Mohottige Premachandra (24 August 1940 – 24 October 1994) was a Sri Lanka politician who served as the Cabinet Minister of Labour and Vocational Training of United National Party government from 1990 to 1994. He was re-elected from the Parliamentary election of 1994.

Born in the year 1940 he belonged to the land owning "Gamlath" family in Kurunegala. Known to be a brave and a sharp leader he was initially challenged with winning his electorate, Mawathagama which was mostly populated by a different caste despite him belonging to the Govigama caste which was a minority in the said electorate. He was known as the "Silver Bell of Wayamba" due to his great oratory skills. Kurunegala and Puttlam districts being Leftist strongholds, him and Gamini Jayawickrema Perera were able to establish their control over the said province and protect the citizens during the insurgencies and insurrection. He joined hands with Lalith Athulathmudali and Gamini Dissanayake when a no confidence motion was tabled against President Ranasinghe Premedasa.

== Death ==
Premachandra was assassinated by a female suicide bomber of the Liberation Tigers of Tamil Eelam (LTTE) while attending an election rally in support of Gamini Dissanayake, for the Presidential election of 1994. He was an alumnus of Maliyadeva College, Kurunegala.

== See also ==
- Gamini Dissanayake
- Mawatagama Electoral District
