= Leslie Mervyn Jayaratne =

Justice Dr. Leslie Mervyn Jayaratne

2nd Governor of Southern Province
- In office 31 December 1993 – December 1994
- Preceded by: Bakeer Markar
- Succeeded by: Neville Kanakeratne

Personal details
- Born: Ahangama, Southern Province
- Spouse: Rohini Gunaratne
- Education: Mahinda College, St. Peter's College, Ceylon Law College, University of London
- Occupation: lawyer

Justice Dr. Leslie Mervyn Jayaratne is a Sri Lankan lawyer, judge, author and the governor of Southern Province.

== Early life ==
Leslie Mervyn Jayaratne was born in Ahangama in the Southern Province. His primary schooling was at Ahangama Dharmarama School before attending Mahinda College in Galle and then St Peter's College, Colombo.

== Legal career ==
In the 1950s he entered the Ceylon Law College, passing out as a Proctor and practising in Matara. Jayaratne graduated from the University of London, with a Bachelor of Laws (LL.B), joining the Inner Temple, London and was called to the bar in 1969, returning to Sri Lanka later that year.

Jayaratne joined the Sri Lankan judiciary in 1971 as a Magistrate with his first posting in Negombo.

== Governorship ==
After returning to Sri Lanka from a three-year tour of Fiji Jayaratne was appointed Governor of Southern Province on 31 December 1993 by the President Dingiri Banda Wijetunga, However, with the change of Government he lost that posting.

Political offices
Preceded by Bakeer Markar	Governor of Southern Province; 1993-1994	Succeeded by Neville Kanakeratne
