= Nimal Bandara =

Sri Lankan politician

Nimal Bandara නිමල් බංඩාර

3rd Chief Minister of North Western Province
- In office 27 August 1994 – 28 January 1999
- Preceded by: G. M. Premachandra
- Succeeded by: S. B. Nawinne

Personal details
- Party: United National Party

R.M.R Nimal Bandara was the third Chief Minister of North Western Province. He was appointed on 27 August 1994 succeeding G. M. Premachandra and was Chief Minister until 28 January 1999. He was succeeded by S. B. Nawinne.

Political offices
Preceded by G. M. Premachandra	Chief Minister of North Western Province; 1994–1999	Succeeded by S. B. Nawinne
