= Abeyratne Pilapitiya =

Sri Lankan politician (1925–2025)

Hon. Abeyratne Pilapitiya

3rd Governor of Uva
- In office March 1993 – December 1994
- Preceded by: Tilak Ratnayake
- Succeeded by: Ananda Dassanayake

2nd Chief Minister of Sabaragamuwa
- In office 10 April 1989 – March 1993
- Governor: Noel Wimalasena
- Preceded by: G. V. Punchinilame
- Succeeded by: Jayatilake Podinilame

Personal details
- Born: 25 May 1925
- Died: 2025 (aged 99–100)
- Party: United National Party
- Profession: Politician; Governor

Abeyratne Bandara Herath Pilapitiya (25 May 1925 – 2025) was a Sri Lankan politician who served as the 3rd Governor of Uva and 2nd Chief Minister of Sabaragamuwa.

== Life and career ==
Pilapitiya was born on 25 May 1925. He was first elected to parliament in March 1960 general election from Kalawana representing the United National Party, he lost the July 1960 general election to L. de S.A. Gunasekera. He was re-elected in the 1965 general election. He lost his seat to Sarath Muttetuwegama in the 1970 general election. He was again re-elected in the 1977 general election, defeating Sarath Muttetuwegama, but lost his seat in 1980 due to an election petition. He was elected to Chief Minister of Sabaragamuwa in 1989 and served till 1993. He was then appointed Governor of Uva and served till 1994.

Pilapitiya was married to Maheswari, who predeceased him in October 2019. He died in 2025.

Political offices
Preceded by Tilak Ratnayake	Governor of Uva; 1993–1994	Succeeded by Ananda Dassanayake
Preceded by G. V. Punchinilame	Chief Minister of Sabaragamuwa; 1989–1993	Succeeded by Jayatilake Podinilame
