= Jayatilake Podinilame =

Sri Lankan politician

3rd Chief Minister of Sabaragamuwa
- In office March 1993 – June 1998
- Governor: C. N. Saliya Mathew
- Preceded by: Abeyratne Pilapitiya
- Succeeded by: Vacant; Kantha Gunatilleke

Personal details
- Born: 1947/48
- Died: 28 April 2013
- Party: United People’s Freedom Alliance (2010 - 2013)
- Other political affiliations: Janatha Vimukthi Peramuna (1971 - ?); United National Party (? - 2010)

H. Jayatilake Podinilame (1947/48 – 28 April 2013) was a Sri Lankan politician who served as the 3rd Chief Minister of Sabaragamuwa. He was appointed in March 1993 succeeding Abeyratne Pilapitiya and was Chief Minister until June 1998. He was succeeded by Kantha Gunatilleke after a period of vacancy.

Podinilame also served as the Minister of Industries, Trade and Transport in 1991. He was also the Northwestern Development Minister of the UNP Government in 2000. In 2010 left the United National Party and joined the United People’s Freedom Alliance supporting the President’s programme and served as a Deputy Chairman of the Sabaragamuwa Provincial Council until 2012.

Political offices
Preceded by Abeyratne Pilapitiya	Chief Minister of Sabaragamuwa; 1993–1998	Succeeded by Vacant; Kantha Gunatilleke
