= Neville Kanakaratna =

Sri Lankan lawyer; diplomat and scholar

Deshamanya Neville T. D. Kanakaratna (1923 – 19 September 1999) was a Sri Lankan lawyer, diplomat and scholar who was the governor of Southern Province. He was the Sri Lankan Ambassador to the United States and High Commissioner to India.

Educated at Southlands College Galle and at the Royal College, Colombo, where he was the Head Prefect in 1941, Kanakaratna pursued his higher studies at the University of Ceylon, graduating with a B.A. in history. After studying law at the Colombo Law College he became an advocate and was known as a scholar in history.

Kanakaratna went on to serve the government of Ceylon in a legal advisory capacity. Holding appointments such as first secretary and legal adviser to Ceylon's delegation to the UN and thereafter, he served as the minister in the Ceylon's High Commission in London.

Thereafter he worked in the UN in several capacities that included Vice President of the United Nations Trusteeship Council and legal adviser to the Secretary-General of the United Nations.

Kanakaratna went on to become one of Ceylon's prominent diplomats, serving as its Ambassador to the United States and High Commissioner to India, and was the head of the committee for the establishment of the Lakshman Kadirgamar Institute of International Relations and Strategic Studies. He was awarded the title of Deshamanya from the Government of Sri Lanka.

== See also ==
- Sri Lankan Non Career Diplomats

Political offices
Preceded by Leslie Mervyn Jayaratne	Governor of Southern Province; 1995–1999	Succeeded by Ananda Dassanayake
