= K. Vignarajah =

3rd Governor of Western Province
- In office 3 January 1995 – 2 January 2000
- Preceded by: Deva Swaminathan
- Succeeded by: Pathmanathan Ramanathan

K. Vignarajah was the 3rd Governor of Western Province, in Sri Lanka. He held office from 1995 to 2000, he was succeeded by Pathmanathan Ramanathan.

Political offices
| Preceded by D. M. Swaminathan | Governor of Western Province; 1995–2000 | Succeeded by Pathmanathan Ramanathan |
