= Hector Arawwawala =

Sri Lankan politician

Honourable Hector Arawwawala

5th Governor of North Western Province
- In office 13 January 1995 – 3 January 1999
- Preceded by: Anandatissa de Alwis
- Succeeded by: Siripala Jayaweera

Personal details
- Party: United National Party

Hector Arawwawala was the fifth Governor of North Western Province. He was part of the United National Party.

Political offices
Preceded by Anandatissa de Alwis	Governor of the North Western Province; 1995–1999	Succeeded by Siripala Jayaweera
