= Ananda Dassanayake =

Sri Lankan politician (1920–2012)

Ananda Dassanayake (16 April 1920 – 9 August 2012) was a Sri Lankan politician belonging to the Sri Lanka Freedom Party. He was the governor of Uva Province and Southern Province of Sri Lanka. He was a member of the Sri Lankan Parliament for 17 years.

Political offices
Preceded by Neville Kanakeratne	Governor of Southern Province; 1999–2002	Succeeded by Kingsley Wickramaratne
Preceded by Abeyratne Pilapitiya	Governor of Uva; 1995–1999	Succeeded by Sirisena Amarasiri
