= G. D. Mahindasoma =

Sri Lankan politician

Gamage Don Mahindasoma (born 19 February 1928, date of death unknown) was a Sri Lankan politician who was the first Chief Minister of the North Central Province from May 1988 to May 1996. He was elected in 1977 from Kekirawa to the Sri Lankan Parliament. Mahindasoma was born on 19 February 1928. He is deceased.

== See also ==
- List of political families in Sri Lanka
