= W. M. P. B. Dissanayake =

Sri Lankan politician

Weerasooriya Dissanayake Mudiyanselage Punchi Banda Dissanayake known as W. P. B. Dissanayake or W.M.P.B. Dissanayake (April 16, 1927 – May 29, 2003) was a Sri Lankan politician and belonged to the United National Party. He was the Chief Minister of the Central Province of Sri Lanka from Jun 1988 to Jun 1998 and again from Apr 2002 to 29 May 2003. He was elected to the Sri Lankan Parliament in 1977 from Gampola
