= G. P. S. de Silva =

Chief Justice of Sri Lanka from 1991 to 1999

40th Chief Justice of Sri Lanka
- In office 1991–1999
- Appointed by: Ranasinghe Premadasa
- Preceded by: Herbert Thambiah
- Succeeded by: Sarath N. Silva

G. P. S. de Silva is a Sri Lankan judge who served as the 40th Chief Justice of Sri Lanka. He was appointed in 1991 and was Chief Justice until 1999. He was succeeded by Sarath N. Silva.

Legal offices
| Preceded by Herbert Thambiah | Chief Justice of Sri Lanka; 1991–1999 | Succeeded by Sarath N. Silva |
