= C. N. Saliya Mathew =

2nd Governor of Sabaragamuwa
- In office 1993 – 9 June 2005
- Preceded by: Noel Wimalasena
- Succeeded by: Reggie Ranatunga

C. N. Saliya W. Mathew was the 2nd Governor of Sabaragamuwa. He was appointed in 1993 succeeding Noel Wimalasena and was Chief Minister until 9 June 2005. He was succeeded by Reggie Ranatunga.

Political offices
Preceded by Noel Wimalasena	Governor of Sabaragamuwa; 1993–2005	Succeeded by Reggie Ranatunga
