= Rohan Gunaratna =

Singaporean terrorism expert

Professor Rohan Gunaratna (born 1961) is a threat specialist of the global security environment. Professor Gunaratna has over 30 years of academic, policy, and operational experience in national and international security. He is Professor of Security Studies at the S. Rajaratnam School of International Studies, Nanyang Technology University, Singapore.

He received his master's from the University of Notre Dame in the United States, where he was Hesburgh Scholar and his doctorate from the University of St Andrews in the United Kingdom, where he was British Chevening Scholar. A former Senior Fellow at the Combating Terrorism Centre at the United States Military Academy at West Point and at the Fletcher School of Law and Diplomacy, Gunaratna was invited to testify on the structure of al-Qaeda before the 9/11 Commission.

Gunaratna holds several honorary appointments including as Chairman of the Global Peace Institute, UK; Secretary General of the Consortium for Countering the Financing of Terrorism (CCFT); Member of the Advisory Council, The International Institute for Justice and the Rule of Law (IIJ), Malta; and Member of the Board of Directors, Indo-Pacific Centre, Singapore.

The author of 20 books including Inside al Qaeda: Global Network of Terror (University of Columbia Press), Gunaratna edited the Insurgency and Terrorism Series of the Imperial College Press, London. He is a trainer for national security agencies, law enforcement authorities and military counter terrorism units, interviewed terrorists and insurgents in Afghanistan, Pakistan, Iraq, Yemen, Libya, Saudi Arabia and other conflict zones. For advancing international security cooperation, Gunaratna received the Major General Ralph H. Van Deman Award.

== Education ==
Gunaratna was educated in Asia, Europe, and US. In Sri Lanka, he studied at Ananda College Colombo, Sri Lanka’s premier Buddhist school. Mentored by Colonel G. W. Rajapaksa, he was appointed a senior prefect by the school principal. In Malta, GC, he studied at Stella Maris College under Brother Louis Camilleri fsc. After relocating to the US, Gunaratna received the Hesburgh Scholarship to study at the University of Notre Dame, a globally ranked US university. He received his master's in International Peace Studies at the University of Notre Dame. His thesis on the changing nature of warfare was supervised by William De Mars. His professors included Robert Scott Appleby, a world authority on religious fundamentalism and Robert C. Johansen, a specialist in peace building. Gunaratna received a three-year British Chevening Scholarship from the Foreign and Commonwealth Office in the UK to pursue his doctorate at the University of St Andrews a globally ranked university, in Scotland. He also received a three-year International Relations Award from the University of St Andrews. His doctoral thesis from the University of St Andrews on migrant and diaspora support for terrorism and insurgency was supervised by Professor Bruce Hoffman, the leading US authority on terrorism. While Professor Paul Wilkinson, the leading British authority on counterterrorism served as his internal examiner, his external examiner was Professor Gerard Chaliand, the leading French counterinsurgency specialist.

== Career ==
In 2013, Sri Lankan member of parliament Wijeyadasa Rajapakshe wrote in op-ed in which said that "he (Gunaratna) insisted the importance of combating terrorism, he did not address on the cause for the emergence of terrorism." In 2017, Inspector General of Bangladesh Police dismissed his claims of ISIS presence in Bangladesh by saying that he had no experience in "real issues."

=== Hambali claims ===
In 2003, Gunaratna claimed that Al-Qaeda commander Riduan Isamuddin (alias Hambali) regularly visited Australia and plotted to fly planes into the British Houses of Parliament; these claims were dismissed as baseless by the ASIO. Commenting on one of his books, the Pacific Journalism Review said in its review that "his writing here on Indonesia reveals a remarkably narrow selection of sources, a profound lack of knowledge, and a flawed understanding of the history of the Indonesian armed forces and of their intelligence operates". Australian journalist and commentator on intelligence issues Brian Toohey has called him a "self-proclaimed expert". He has also made false claims to be a "principal investigator" at the UN's Terrorism Prevention Branch. In reality, he has only spoken at a seminar organized by the Australian Parliamentary Library, testified at a Congressional hearing on terrorism and delivered a research paper at a conference organized by the UN's Department for Disarmament Affairs.

In 2004, New Zealand journalist Martin Bright described Gunaratna as “the least reliable of the experts on bin Laden”. His claims to the New Zealand Herald that "sympathisers and supporters of various terrorist groups were in New Zealand” and to have seen their fundraising leaflets were also dismissed by New Zealand's Financial Intelligence Unit.

=== Claim against Canadian Tamil Congress ===
In a February 2011 article in Lakbima News, Gunaratna claimed that the Canadian Tamil Congress (CTC) was a front for the Liberation Tigers of Tamil Eelam. The CTC sued Gunaratna, and on 21 January 2014, the Ontario Superior Court of Justice ruled against Gunaratna, ordering home to pay the CTC damages of $37,000, and costs of $16,000. In his ruling judge Stephen E. Firestone stated that Gunaratna's claims were unequivocally and incontrovertibly "false and untrue".

== Bibliography ==
- Gunaratna, Rohan (2002). Jane's counter terrorism. Peter Chalk (2nd ed.). Coulsdon, Surrey, UK: Jane's Information Group. ISBN 0-7106-2357-7. OCLC 51906007.
