= 2001 in Sri Lanka =

- Decades: 1980s; 1990s; 2000s; 2010s; 2020s
- See also: Other events of 2001; Timeline of Sri Lankan history

The following lists events that happened during 2001 in Sri Lanka.

== Incumbents ==
- President: Chandrika Kumaratunga
- Prime Minister: Ratnasiri Wickremanayake (until 7 December); Ranil Wickremesinghe (starting 7 December)
- Chief Justice: Sarath N. Silva

=== Governors ===
- Central Province – Tudor Dassanayake (until 1 January); K. B. Ratnayake (starting 1 January)
- North Central Province – G. M. S. Samaraweera
- North Eastern Province – Asoka Jayawardena
- North Western Province – Siripala Jayaweera
- Sabaragamuwa Province – C. N. Saliya Mathew
- Southern Province – Ananda Dassanayake (until January); Kingsley Wickramaratne (starting 1 February)
- Uva Province – Sirisena Amarasiri
- Western Province – Pathmanathan Ramanathan

=== Chief Ministers ===
- Central Province – Sarath Ekanayake
- North Central Province – Berty Premalal Dissanayake
- North Western Province – S. B. Nawinne
- Sabaragamuwa Province – Asoka Jayawardena (until 13 December); Mohan Ellawala (starting 13 December)
- Southern Province – Mahinda Yapa Abeywardena (until 21 December); H. G. Sirisena (starting 21 December)
- Uva Province – Samaraweera Weerawanni (until 29 October); Aththintha Marakalage Buddhadasa (starting 29 October)
- Western Province – Reginald Cooray

== Events ==
- Sri Lankan Civil War
  - Eelam War III
- 24 July – Bandaranaike Airport attack: The LTTE launch a bold attack on Bandaranaike Airport. This would be one of the boldest attacks launched by the organization to date. Multiple aircraft ranging from civilian airlines to military helicopters were destroyed and damaged, and the nation's tourist industry was greatly affected.
- October – A coalition of several Sri Lankan Tamil political parties known as the Tamil National Alliance is formed, and begins participating in elections. The party runs on a campaign of Sri Lankan Tamil nationalism and is formed in response to the oppression of the Tamil minority in Sri Lanka.
- 5 December – 2001 Sri Lankan parliamentary election: The coalition government led by the People's Alliance collapses, after the Sri Lanka Muslim Congress MPs and some other MPs leave the coalition. In order to avoid a no-confidence motion, President Chandrika Kumaratunga calls for early general elections. The United National Front led by Opposition Leader Ranil Wickremesinghe defeats the incumbent People's Alliance, and Wickremesinghe is sworn in as the Prime Minister on 7 December. This led to a cohabitation government between the UNF and the PA which would last until 2004, where the president and prime minister were from two different parties.

== Notes ==
a. Gunaratna, Rohan. (1998). Pg.353, Sri Lanka's Ethnic Crisis and National Security, Colombo: South Asian Network on Conflict Research. ISBN 955-8093-00-9
