= 9th Parliament of Sri Lanka =

1989–1994 meeting of the Sri Lankan legislature

←	8th	10th	→

Overview
- Legislative body: Parliament of Sri Lanka
- Term: 9 March 1989 – 24 June 1994
- Election: 15 February 1989

Senior parliamentarians
- Speaker: M. H. Mohamed, UNP
- Deputy Speaker and Chairman of Committees: Gamini Fonseka, UNP
- Deputy Chairman of Committees: Ariya B. Rekawa, UNP
- Prime Minister: D. B. Wijetunga, UNP (1989–93); Ranil Wickremesinghe, UNP (1993–94)
- Leader of the Opposition: Sirimavo Bandaranaike, SLFP
- Leader of the House: Ranil Wickremesinghe, UNP (1989–93); Wijayapala Mendis, UNP (1993–94)
- Chief Government Whip: Vincent Perera, UNP (1989–93); Wimal Wickremasinghe, UNP (1993–94)
- Chief Opposition Whip: Richard Pathirana, SLFP

Sessions
- 1st: 9 March 1989 – 23 March 1990
- 2nd: 4 April 1990 – 21 March 1991
- 3rd: 19 April 1991 – 30 August 1991
- 4th: 24 September 1991 – 23 March 1993
- 5th: 22 April 1993 – 24 June 1994

The 9th Parliament of Sri Lanka, known officially as the 2nd Parliament of the Democratic Socialist Republic of Sri Lanka, was a meeting of the Parliament of Sri Lanka, with the membership determined by the results of the 1989 parliamentary election held on 15 February 1989. The parliament met for the first time on 9 March 1989 and was dissolved on 24 June 1994.

== Election ==
The 9th parliamentary elections were held on 15 February 1989. The incumbent United National Party (UNP) retained control of parliament by winning 125 of the 225 available seats. The Sri Lanka Freedom Party (SLFP), the main opposition party, won 67 seats. The Eelam Revolutionary Organisation of Students (EROS), a Tamil militant group, won 13 seats contesting as independent groups whilst an alliance of Tamil parties (TULF/ENDLF/EPRLF/TELO) won 10 seats. The remaining 10 seats were won by smaller parties.

=== Results ===
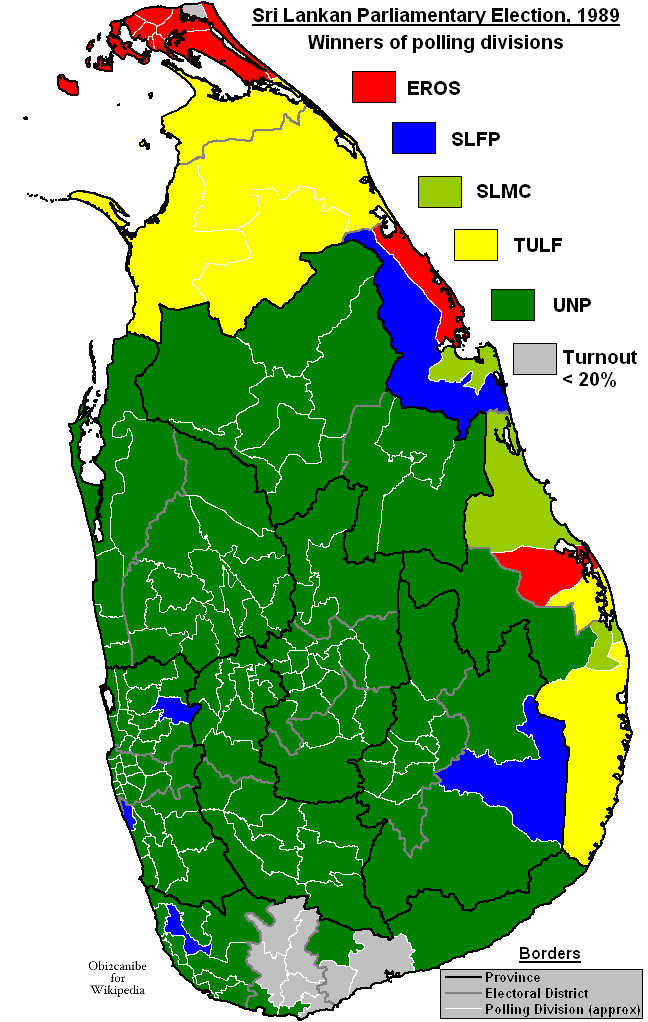
Winners of electoral districts. UNP in green and SLFP in blue.

Alliance	Votes	%	Seats
United National Party	2,838,005	50.71%	125
Sri Lanka Freedom Party	1,785,369	31.90%	67
Eelam Revolutionary Organisation of Students	229,877	4.11%	13
Tamil United Liberation Front; Eelam National Democratic Liberation Front; Eelam People's Revolutionary Liberation Front; Tamil Eelam Liberation Organization	188,594	3.37%	10
Sri Lanka Muslim Congress	202,016	3.61%	4
United Socialist Alliance	160,271	2.86%	3
Mahajana Eksath Peramuna	91,128	1.63%	3
Others	101,208	1.80%	0
Total	5,596,468	100.00%	225

The new parliament was sworn in on 9 March 1989. M. H. Mohamed was elected Speaker, Gamini Fonseka was elected Deputy Speaker and Ariya B. Rekawa was elected Deputy Chairman of Committees.

== Government ==
On 3 March 1989, President Ranasinghe Premadasa appointed D. B. Wijetunga as Prime Minister. The rest of the cabinet had been appointed earlier, on 18 February 1989.

President Premadasa was assassinated on 1 May 1993. The parliament elected Prime Minister Wijetunga to succeed Premadasa as the president and was duly sworn in on 7 May 1993. The same day, President Wijetunga appointed Ranil Wickremesinghe as the new Prime Minister.

President Wijetunga dissolved parliament early on 24 June 1994, several months before the expiry of its term.

== Members ==
=== Deaths and resignations ===
The 9th parliament saw the following deaths and resignations:

- 13 July 1989 – Appapillai Amirthalingam (TULF/NAT) assassinated. Replaced by Mavai Senathirajah (TULF/NAT).
- 25 June 1989 – Anura Daniel Mahavithanaarachchige (UNP/KAN) assassinated. Replaced by Gemunu Rajendranth Abeysundre (UNP/KAN).
- 11 May 1990 – Sam Tambimuttu (EPRLF/BAT) assassinated. Replaced by Joseph Pararajasingham (TULF/BAT).
- 19 June 1990 – G. Yogasangari (EPRLF/JAF) assassinated.
- 2 March 1991 – Ranjan Wijeratne (UNP/NAT) assassinated.
- 23 April 1993 – Lalith Athulathmudali (DUNF/COL) assassinated.
- 7 May 1993 – D. B. Wijetunga (UNP/KAN) vacated his seat to assume the office of President of Sri Lanka.

=== List ===
Name	Electoral District	Preference Votes	Member From	Member To	Elected Party	Elected Alliance	Final Party	Final Alliance	Notes
Abeykoon, A. M. M.	KAN	26,881	9 March 1989	24 June 1994	SLFP		SLFP		
Abeyratne, Pathirage Don	KAL	30,292	9 March 1989	24 June 1994	UNP	UNP	UNP	UNP	
Aboosally, M. L. M.	RAT	32,133	9 March 1989	24 June 1994	UNP	UNP	UNP	UNP	
Adhikari, A. M. S.	ANU	25,617	9 March 1989	24 June 1994	UNP	UNP	UNP	UNP	Minister of Post & Telecommunication (91-).
Adhikari, Janak Mahendra	ANU	22,568	9 March 1989	24 June 1994	SLFP		SLFP		
Alfred, Innasimuthu	VAN	935	9 March 1989	24 June 1994	EROS	IND	EROS	IND	
Aluvihare, Alick	MTL	31,004	9 March 1989	24 June 1994	UNP	UNP	UNP	UNP	Minister of Post & Telecommunication (-91). Minister of Ports & Shipping (91-).
Amaratunga, John	GAM	90,797	9 March 1989	24 June 1994	UNP	UNP	UNP	UNP	
Amirthalingam, Appapillai	NAT		9 March 1989	13 July 1989	TULF	TULF	TULF	TULF	Murdered. Replaced by Mavai Senathirajah.
Arachchi, Gunapala Tissakutti	HAM	3,600	9 March 1989	24 June 1994	UNP	UNP	UNP	UNP	State Minister of Environment & Parliamentary Affairs.
Ariyadasa, D. M.	ANU	27,724	9 March 1989	24 June 1994	UNP	UNP	UNP	UNP	
Ariyaratna, D. M.	MON	12,985	9 March 1989	24 June 1994	UNP	UNP	UNP	UNP	
Ashraff, M. H. M.	AMP	56,464	9 March 1989	24 June 1994	SLMC		SLMC		
Atapattu, Ranjit	HAM	10,381	9 March 1989	24 June 1994	UNP	UNP	UNP	UNP	
Athukorala, Gamini	RAT	53,420	9 March 1989	24 June 1994	UNP	UNP	UNP	UNP	Minister of Land, Irrigation & Mahaweli Development (91-).
Athulathmudali, Lalith	COL	235,447	9 March 1989	23 April 1993	UNP	UNP	DUNF		Murdered.
Attanayake, Tissa	KAN	27,788	9 March 1989	24 June 1994	UNP	UNP	UNP	UNP	
Attygale, Athula Kularatne	RAT	39,809	9 March 1989	24 June 1994	UNP	UNP	UNP	UNP	
Bakaar, Abu	VAN	5,355	9 March 1989	24 June 1994	SLMC		SLMC		
Bakmeewewa, Nihal Yasendra	AMP	24,752	9 March 1989	24 June 1994	UNP	UNP	UNP	UNP	
Balasooriya, Arachchilage Jagath	KEG	23,088	9 March 1989	24 June 1994	SLFP		SLFP		
Banda, Dharmadasa	MON	20,788	9 March 1989	24 June 1994	UNP	UNP	UNP	UNP	Minister of Agriculture & Research (90-).
Banda, H. M. A. L.	KUR	34,525	9 March 1989	24 June 1994	UNP	UNP	UNP	UNP	
Bandara, Chandrani	ANU	25,541	9 March 1989	24 June 1994	UNP	UNP	UNP	UNP	Minister of Power & Energy (90-).
Bandara, R. M. Ranjith Madduma	MON	19,165	9 March 1989	24 June 1994	UNP	UNP	UNP	UNP	
Bandaranaike, Anura	GAM	107,177	9 March 1989	24 June 1994	SLFP		UNP	UNP	Resigned from SLFP & joined UNP Oct 1993.
Bandaranaike, D. M.	KUR	31,788	9 March 1989	24 June 1994	UNP	UNP	UNP	UNP	
Bandaranaike, Sirimavo	GAM	214,390	9 March 1989	24 June 1994	SLFP		SLFP		Leader of the Opposition (89–94).
Cader, A. R. M. Abdul	KAN	33,757	9 March 1989	24 June 1994	UNP	UNP	UNP	UNP	
Cader, Mohamed Jabir Abdul	COL	30,252	9 March 1989	24 June 1994	UNP	UNP	UNP	UNP	
Casinader, Prince Gunarasa	BAT	21,959	9 March 1989	24 June 1994	EPRLF	TULF	EPRLF	TULF	
Chandradasa, A. P. G.	AMP	28,075	9 March 1989	24 June 1994	UNP	UNP	UNP	UNP	
Cooray, Sirisena	COL	92,263	9 March 1989	24 June 1994	UNP	UNP	UNP	UNP	Minister of Housing & Construction (89-).
Cooray, M. M. M. J.	KAL	27,991	9 March 1989	24 June 1994	UNP	UNP	UNP	UNP	
Corea, Harindra Jayanthi	PUT	32,899	9 March 1989	24 June 1994	UNP	UNP	UNP	UNP	
Cyril, Patabandi Madduma Baduge	HAM	5,911	9 March 1989	24 June 1994	UNP	UNP	UNP	UNP	
Dassanayaka, U. M. S.	KUR	43,804	9 March 1989	24 June 1994	UNP	UNP	UNP	UNP	
Dawood, Basheer Segu	BAT			24 June 1994	EROS	IND	EROS	IND	
Dayaratna, Petikirige	AMP	37,996	9 March 1989	24 June 1994	UNP	UNP	UNP	UNP	Minister of Land, Irrigation & Mahaweli Development (-91). Ministry of Reconstruction, Rehabilitation & Social Welfare (91-).
de Silva, H. C.	KAN	29,726	9 March 1989	24 June 1994	UNP	UNP	UNP	UNP	
de Silva, Nimal Siripala	COL	38,647	9 March 1989	24 June 1994	SLFP		SLFP		
de Soyza, R. N. G.	GAL	28,474	9 March 1989	24 June 1994	UNP	UNP	UNP	UNP	
Dharmawardana, W. M. S. K.	PUT	26,830	9 March 1989	24 June 1994	UNP	UNP	UNP	UNP	
Dissanayake, Berty Premalal	ANU	16,220	9 March 1989	24 June 1994	SLFP		SLFP		
Dissanayake, D. M. G.	MON	26,193	9 March 1989	24 June 1994	SLFP		SLFP		
Dissanayake, Gamini	NUW	73,790	9 March 1989	24 June 1994	UNP	UNP	UNP	UNP	Minister of Plantation Industries (89–90). Left UNP and formed DUNF. Rejoined UNP.
Dissanayake, J. M. D.	GAM	56,610	9 March 1989	24 June 1994	UNP	UNP	UNP	UNP	
Dissanayake, S. B.	NUW	18,986	9 March 1989	24 June 1994	SLFP		SLFP		
Dodangoda, Amarasiri	GAL	66,431	9 March 1989	24 June 1994	SLFP		SLFP		
Don, E. W. D.	BAD	28,385	9 March 1989	24 June 1994	SLFP		SLFP		
Dunstan, A. M. U. S.	GAL	63,985	9 March 1989	24 June 1994	UNP	UNP	UNP	UNP	
Dunuwila, T. H.	KAN	28,377	9 March 1989	24 June 1994	UNP	UNP	UNP	UNP	
Ediriweera, Madurapala	MTR	8,562	9 March 1989	24 June 1994	UNP	UNP	UNP	UNP	
Edward, Herath Herald James	PUT	27,763	9 March 1989	24 June 1994	UNP	UNP	UNP	UNP	
Edward, Sebastiyampillai	JAF	17,429	9 March 1989	24 June 1994	EROS	IND	EROS	IND	
Ekanayake, Nandimithra	MTL	17,941	9 March 1989	24 June 1994	SLFP		SLFP		
Fernando, Milroy	PUT	18,375	9 March 1989	24 June 1994	SLFP		SLFP		
Fernando, Neville	KAL	40,977	9 March 1989	24 June 1994	SLFP		SLFP		
Fernando, Tyronne	COL	44,718	9 March 1989	24 June 1994	UNP	UNP	UNP	UNP	
Fernandopulle, Jeyaraj	GAM	51,485	9 March 1989	24 June 1994	SLFP		SLFP		
Fonseka, Gamini	MTR	19,618	9 March 1989	24 June 1994	UNP	UNP	UNP	UNP	Deputy Speaker (89–94).
Galappaththy, Peter Silva Loku	MTR	7,094	9 March 1989	24 June 1994	UNP	UNP	UNP	UNP	
Gamage, Lal Dharmapriya	ANU	20,189	9 March 1989	24 June 1994	UNP	UNP	UNP	UNP	
Gamage, Piyasena	GAL	35,456	9 March 1989	24 June 1994	SLFP		SLFP		
Gankande, Chandrasekara	RAT	37,875	9 March 1989	24 June 1994	UNP	UNP	UNP	UNP	
Gunaratne, C. V.	COL	60,603	9 March 1989	24 June 1994	SLFP		SLFP		
Gunaseelan, Alathipody	BAT	22,889	9 March 1989		EROS	IND	EROS	IND	
Gunasekera, Mahen	GAM	44,630	9 March 1989	24 June 1994	UNP	UNP	UNP	UNP	
Gunawardena, Bandula	COL	50,861	9 March 1989	24 June 1994	MEP		MEP		
Gunawardena, Dinesh	COL	70,616	9 March 1989	24 June 1994	MEP		MEP		
Gunawardena, Gitanjana	NAT		9 March 1989	24 June 1994	MEP		MEP		
Gunawardena, M. K. A. D. S.	TRI	11,260	9 March 1989	24 June 1994	SLFP		SLFP		
Hameed, A. C. S.	KAN	36,375	9 March 1989	24 June 1994	UNP	UNP	UNP	UNP	Minister of Higher Education, Science & Technology (89-). Minister of Justice (90-).
Hapangama, Anura Pradeep	GAM	47,550	9 March 1989	24 June 1994	SLFP		SLFP		
Hary, Abeydheera	HAM	5,699	9 March 1989	24 June 1994	UNP	UNP	UNP	UNP	
Heenmahaththaya, U. L.	RAT	28,142	9 March 1989	24 June 1994	SLFP		SLFP		
Herath, Harold	NAT		9 March 1989	24 June 1994	UNP	UNP	UNP	UNP	Minister of Foreign Affairs (90-).
Herath, Renuka	NUW	31,271	9 March 1989	24 June 1994	UNP	UNP	UNP	UNP	Minister of Health & Women's Affairs.
Hettiarachchi, Indradasa	KAL	54,099	9 March 1989	24 June 1994	UNP	UNP	UNP	UNP	
Hizbullah, Alim Mohamed	BAT	15,832	9 March 1989	24 June 1994	SLMC		SLMC		
Hurulle, Themiya Loku Bandara	ANU	20,392	9 March 1989	24 June 1994	UNP	UNP	UNP	UNP	
Jambugahapitiyagedera, W. B.	MTL	31,635	9 March 1989	24 June 1994	UNP	UNP	UNP	UNP	
Jayakody, Lakshman	GAM	62,652	9 March 1989	24 June 1994	SLFP		SLFP		
Jayaratne, D. M.	KAN	54,290	9 March 1989	24 June 1994	SLFP		SLFP		
Jayasinghe, Dharmadewa	KEG	42,170	9 March 1989	24 June 1994	UNP	UNP	UNP	UNP	
Jayathilaka, Ariyarathna	GAM	39,893	9 March 1989	24 June 1994	UNP	UNP	UNP	UNP	
Jayawardena, Vincent	GAL	42,085	9 March 1989	24 June 1994	UNP	UNP	UNP	UNP	
Jinadasa, Vidana Gamage	MTL	22,941	9 March 1989	24 June 1994	UNP	UNP	UNP	UNP	
Karunakaram, Govinthan	BAT	25,651	9 March 1989	24 June 1994	TELO	TULF	TELO	TULF	
Karunaratne, Amarakone Chandra	BAD	20,026	9 March 1989	24 June 1994	UNP	UNP	UNP	UNP	
Karunaratne, M. M. S.	KEG	50,779	9 March 1989	24 June 1994	UNP	UNP	UNP	UNP	
Karunaratne, Tilak	KAL	54,339	9 March 1989	24 June 1994	SLFP		SLFP		
Karunathilake, Rupa	GAL	51,147	9 March 1989	24 June 1994	UNP	UNP	UNP	UNP	Minister of Ports & Shipping (90–91). Minister of Plantation Industry (91-).
Kaviratne, Punchi Banda	MTL	23,541	9 March 1989	24 June 1994	UNP	UNP	UNP	UNP	
Kiriella, Lakshman	KAN	20,898	9 March 1989	24 June 1994	SLFP		SLFP		
Kuhaneswaran, Raja	VAN	6,276	9 March 1989	24 June 1994	TELO	TULF	TELO	TULF	
Kularathne, Ananda	HAM	9,470	9 March 1989	24 June 1994	UNP	UNP	UNP	UNP	
Kumarage, Don Ranjith Nanda	GAL	43,609	9 March 1989	24 June 1994	UNP	UNP	UNP	UNP	
Kurukularatne, Buddhika	GAL	24,010	9 March 1989	24 June 1994	UNP	UNP	UNP	UNP	
Loganathapillai, Thambu	JAF	17,616	9 March 1989	24 June 1994	EROS	IND	EROS	IND	
Lokubandara, W. J. M.	BAD	52,559	9 March 1989	24 June 1994	UNP	UNP	UNP	UNP	Minister of Education, Cultural Affairs & Information (89–90). Minister of Cultural Affairs & Information (90-).
Lokuge, Gamini	COL	48,790	9 March 1989	24 June 1994	UNP	UNP	UNP	UNP	
Maharoof, Mohamed	TRI	10,000	9 March 1989	24 June 1994	UNP	UNP	UNP	UNP	
Mahavithanaarachchige, A. D.	KAN	53,396	9 March 1989	25 June 1989	UNP	UNP	UNP	UNP	Murdered.
Majeed, Seid Ahamed Abdul	POL	12,299	9 March 1989	24 June 1994	UNP	UNP	UNP	UNP	
Makar, Imithiyas Bakeer	KAL	35,433	9 March 1989	24 June 1994	UNP	UNP	UNP	UNP	
Mallimarachchi, Weerasinghe	COL	41,508	9 March 1989	24 June 1994	UNP	UNP	UNP	UNP	District Minister for Colombo. Minister of Food & Cooperatives (90-).
Mansoor, Abdul Rasak	NAT		9 March 1989	24 June 1994	UNP	UNP	UNP	UNP	Minister of Trade & Shipping (89–90). Minister of Trade & Commerce (90-).
Mathavarajah, Konamalai	TRI	575	9 March 1989	24 June 1994	EROS	IND	EROS	IND	
Matthew, Caluwadevage Nanda	RAT	43,307	9 March 1989	24 June 1994	UNP	UNP	UNP	UNP	Minister of Youth Affairs & Sports.
Mendis, Wijayapala	GAM	59,235	9 March 1989	24 June 1994	UNP	UNP	UNP	UNP	Leader of the House (93–94). Minister of Transport & Highways.
Mohamed, Farook Yoonus Lebbe	KEG	38,857	9 March 1989	24 June 1994	UNP	UNP	UNP	UNP	
Mohamed, M. H.	COL	47,451	9 March 1989	24 June 1994	UNP	UNP	UNP	UNP	Speaker (89–94).
Moonesinghe, Anil	KAL	40,320	9 March 1989	24 June 1994	SLFP		SLFP		
Moonesinghe, Mangala	KAL	28,522	9 March 1989	24 June 1994	SLFP		SLFP		
Mudiyanselage, A. D. D.	NUW	23,418	9 March 1989	24 June 1994	SLFP		SLFP		
Muthubanda, S. A.	POL	10,336	9 March 1989	24 June 1994	UNP	UNP	UNP	UNP	
Nadan, Jeyaratnam Thiviya	AMP	17,880	9 March 1989	24 June 1994	EPRLF	TULF	EPRLF	TULF	
Nalanda, Ellawala	RAT	75,645	9 March 1989	24 June 1994	SLFP		SLFP		
Nanayakkara, Hemakumara	GAL	37,310	9 March 1989	24 June 1994	SLFP		SLFP		
Nanayakkara, Vasudeva	RAT	13,013	9 March 1989	24 June 1994	NSSP	USA	NSSP	USA	
Navaratnam, Kandiah	JAF	22,255	9 March 1989	24 June 1994	EPRLF	TULF	EPRLF	TULF	
Nawinne, S. B.	KUR	38,696	9 March 1989	24 June 1994	SLFP		SLFP		
Nelson, H. G. P.	POL	18,093	9 March 1989	24 June 1994	UNP	UNP	UNP	UNP	
Niyathapala, Arachchige Jinadasa	COL	67,801	9 March 1989	24 June 1994	SLFP		SLFP		
Padmasiri, K. H. G. N.	GAL	35,772	9 March 1989	24 June 1994	SLFP		SLFP		
Pararajasingham, Joseph	BAT			24 June 1994	TULF	TULF	TULF	TULF	Replaces T. S. P. Thevarasa.
Pararasasingam, Eliyathamby	JAF	36,340	9 March 1989	24 June 1994	EROS	IND	EROS	IND	
Pathirana, Richard	GAL	64,268	9 March 1989	24 June 1994	SLFP		SLFP		Chief Opposition Whip (89–94).
Peiris, Malwattage Nimal Ransiri	COL	27,130	9 March 1989	24 June 1994	UNP	UNP	UNP	UNP	
Perera, Dickson	COL	50,735	9 March 1989	24 June 1994	SLFP		SLFP		
Perera, Festus	PUT	76,390	9 March 1989	24 June 1994	UNP	UNP	UNP	UNP	Minister of Power & Energy (-90). Minister of Public Administration, Provincial Councils & Home Affairs (90-).
Perera, I. M. P. P.	GAM	63,602	9 March 1989	24 June 1994	UNP	UNP	UNP	UNP	
Perera, Joseph Michael	GAM	104,094	9 March 1989	24 June 1994	UNP	UNP	UNP	UNP	Minister of Fisheries & Aquatic Research.
Perera, Kasadoruge Vincent	KEG	42,237	9 March 1989	24 June 1994	UNP	UNP	UNP	UNP	
Perera, Matthew Vincent	COL	42,776	9 March 1989	24 June 1994	UNP	UNP	UNP	UNP	Chief Government Whip (89–93). Minister of Justice (-90). Minister of Parliamentary Affairs (-91). Minister of Environment (-91).
Piyasiri, H. R.	MTR	8,446	9 March 1989	24 June 1994	UNP	UNP	UNP	UNP	
Premachandra, G. M.	KUR	68,562	9 March 1989	24 June 1994	UNP	UNP	UNP	UNP	
Premachandra, Munidasa	KUR	32,699	9 March 1989	24 June 1994	SLFP		SLFP		
Premachandran, Suresh	JAF	20,738	9 March 1989	24 June 1994	EPRLF	TULF	EPRLF	TULF	
Premaratne, Gunasekara	COL	44,559	9 March 1989	24 June 1994	UNP	UNP	UNP	UNP	
Priyanganie, Abeyweera Sumithra	KAL	51,494	9 March 1989	24 June 1994	SLFP		SLFP		
Pulendran, Rasa Manohari	VAN	3,260	9 March 1989	24 June 1994	UNP	UNP	UNP	UNP	
Rajakaruna, R. M. Jayasena	KUR	30,346	9 March 1989	24 June 1994	SLFP		SLFP		
Rajakaruna, Sarath Chandra	GAM	80,154	9 March 1989	24 June 1994	UNP	UNP	UNP	UNP	
Rajapaksa, Chamal	HAM	10,342	9 March 1989	24 June 1994	SLFP		SLFP		
Rajapaksa, Lionel	KUR	31,419	9 March 1989	24 June 1994	SLFP		SLFP		
Rajapaksa, Mahinda	HAM	13,073	9 March 1989	24 June 1994	SLFP		SLFP		
Rajenthiram, Joseph George	JAF	13,928	9 March 1989	24 June 1994	EROS	IND	EROS	IND	
Ralalage, Madduma Bandara Sethapenage Appuhamy	BAD	23,066	9 March 1989	24 June 1994	SLFP		SLFP		
Ranasinghe, Sunethra	COL	37,165	9 March 1989	24 June 1994	UNP	UNP	UNP	UNP	
Ranatunga, Chandradasa	KEG	29,051	9 March 1989	24 June 1994	UNP	UNP	UNP	UNP	
Ranatunga, Reggie	GAM	37,163	9 March 1989	24 June 1994	SLFP		SLFP		
Ranatunga, Wijesundara Bandara	NUW	29,067	9 March 1989	24 June 1994	UNP	UNP	UNP	UNP	
Ranawaka, J. S. K.	KAL	20,983	9 March 1989	24 June 1994	UNP	UNP	UNP	UNP	
Ratnarajah, Sivapragasam	TRI	784	9 March 1989	24 June 1994	EROS	IND	EROS	IND	
Ratnasabapathy, Eliyathamby	JAF	40,947	9 March 1989	24 June 1994	EROS	IND	EROS	IND	
Ratnayake, Amara Piyaseeli	KUR	58,426	9 March 1989	24 June 1994	UNP	UNP	UNP	UNP	
Ratnayake, Hema	BAD	28,635	9 March 1989	24 June 1994	SLFP		SLFP		
Ratnayake, Kiri Banda	ANU	18,040	9 March 1989	24 June 1994	SLFP		SLFP		
Rekawa, Ariya Bandara	KUR	42,874	9 March 1989	24 June 1994	UNP	UNP	UNP	UNP	Deputy Chairman of Committees (89–94).
Robert, Jayaratne Silva Dedimuni	PUT	32,567	9 March 1989	24 June 1994	SLFP		SLFP		
Sakalasooriya, S. A. S.	GAM	36,363	9 March 1989	24 June 1994	SLFP		SLFP		
Samaranayake, P. S. P.	KAL	36,150	9 March 1989	24 June 1994	UNP	UNP	UNP	UNP	
Samaraweera, Mangala	MTR	11,971	9 March 1989	24 June 1994	SLFP		SLFP		
Samaraweera, Ravindra	BAD	26,348	9 March 1989	24 June 1994	UNP	UNP	UNP	UNP	
Sellasamy, M. S.	COL	36,480	9 March 1989	24 June 1994	CWC	UNP	CWC	UNP	
Selliah, Arunasalam Ponniah	JAF	20,747	9 March 1989	24 June 1994	EROS	IND	EROS	IND	
Selvanayagam, Kanapathy	JAF	1,440	9 March 1989	24 June 1994	EROS	IND	EROS	IND	
Senanayake, Dharmasiri	KEG	24,715	9 March 1989	24 June 1994	SLFP		SLFP		
Senanayake, Maithripala	NAT		9 March 1989	24 June 1994	SLFP		SLFP		
Senathirajah, Mavai	NAT			24 June 1994	TULF	TULF	TULF	TULF	Replaces Appapillai Amirthalingam.
Senewiratne, Athauda	KEG	10,792	9 March 1989	24 June 1994	LSSP	USA	LSSP	USA	
Senewiratne, John	RAT	29,651	9 March 1989	24 June 1994	SLFP		SLFP		
Senewiratne, Lakshman	BAD	32,427	9 March 1989	24 June 1994	UNP	UNP	UNP	UNP	
Silva, Anthony Emmanuel	VAN	6,385	9 March 1989	24 June 1994	EPRLF	TULF	EPRLF	TULF	
Sirisena, Hewagampolage	MTR	8,212	9 March 1989	24 June 1994	SLFP		SLFP		
Sirisena, Maithripala	POL	13,652	9 March 1989	24 June 1994	SLFP		SLFP		
Sivamaharasa, Sinnathamby	JAF	22,622	9 March 1989	24 June 1994	EROS	IND	EROS	IND	
Soyza, Gamini Wijith Wijayamuni	MON	15,128	9 March 1989	24 June 1994	SLFP		SLFP		
Suriyaarachchi, C. A.	POL	11,318	9 March 1989	24 June 1994	UNP	UNP	UNP	UNP	
Tennakoon, Yasaratne	KAN	22,736	9 March 1989	24 June 1994	SLFP		SLFP		
Thevarasa, T. S. P.	BAT	19,431	9 March 1989	11 May 1990	EPRLF	TULF	EPRLF	TULF	Murdered. Replaced by Joseph Pararajasingham.
Thewarapperuma, T. A. K.	AMP	21,751	9 March 1989	24 June 1994	SLFP		SLFP		
Thondaman, Savumiamoorthy	NAT		9 March 1989	24 June 1994	CWC	UNP	CWC	UNP	
Tillekerathne, Stanley	COL	83,636	9 March 1989	24 June 1994	SLFP		SLFP		
Tissa, A. D. R.	NUW	35,375	9 March 1989	24 June 1994	UNP	UNP	UNP	UNP	
Upali, A. M. P.	KUR	41,691	9 March 1989	24 June 1994	UNP	UNP	UNP	UNP	
Wadigamangawa, Asoka	PUT	56,696	9 March 1989	24 June 1994	UNP	UNP	UNP	UNP	
Wanninayaka, W. M. H. B.	KUR	34,627	9 March 1989	24 June 1994	UNP	UNP	UNP	UNP	
Weerawanni, Samaraweera	BAD	35,210	9 March 1989	24 June 1994	UNP	UNP	UNP	UNP	
Welagedara, S. B.	KUR	44,437	9 March 1989	24 June 1994	UNP	UNP	UNP	UNP	
Wickremaratne, Kingsly Tissa	COL	38,815	9 March 1989	24 June 1994	SLFP		SLFP		
Wickremasinghe, A. D.	MTR	9,579	9 March 1989	24 June 1994	UNP	UNP	UNP	UNP	
Wickremasinghe, D. P.	KUR	31,609	9 March 1989	24 June 1994	SLFP		SLFP		
Wickremasinghe, Ranil	GAM	86,477	9 March 1989	24 June 1994	UNP	UNP	UNP	UNP	Leader of the House (89–93). Minister of Industries, Science & Technology (89-). Prime Minister (93–94).
Wickremasinghe, Wimal	RAT	45,680	9 March 1989	24 June 1994	UNP	UNP	UNP	UNP	Minister of Environment & Parliamentary Affairs (91-). Chief Government Whip (93–94).
Wijayawardhana, Ranjan	MTR	9,925	9 March 1989	24 June 1994	UNP	UNP	UNP	UNP	
Wijekoon, Ukkubanda	KUR	42,801	9 March 1989	24 June 1994	UNP	UNP	UNP	UNP	Minister of Handloom Industries. Minister of Textiles (90-).
Wijeratne, Ranjan	NAT		9 March 1989	2 March 1991	UNP	UNP	UNP	UNP	Minister of Foreign Affairs (89–90). Deputy Minister of Defence. Minister of Plantation Industries (90-). Murdered.
Wijesekara, Mahinda	MTR	18,517	9 March 1989	24 June 1994	SLFP		SLFP		
Wijesiri, R. P.	KAN	27,555	9 March 1989	24 June 1994	UNP	UNP	UNP	UNP	
Wijetunga, Dingiri Banda	KAN	58,617	9 March 1989		UNP	UNP	UNP	UNP	Prime Minister (89–93). Elected President.
Wijeyeratne, M. S.	GAM	52,738	9 March 1989	24 June 1994	UNP	UNP	UNP	UNP	
Wijeyeratne, Mano	KEG	28,065	9 March 1989	24 June 1994	UNP	UNP	UNP	UNP	
Yogasangari, Ganeshankari	JAF	20,223	9 March 1989	19 June 1990	EPRLF	TULF	EPRLF	TULF	Murdered.
?	NAT		9 March 1989	24 June 1994	EROS	IND	EROS	IND	
Amit, M. H.	NAT		9 March 1989	24 June 1994		UNP		UNP	
Obeywansa, Kalinga	NAT		9 March 1989	24 June 1994		UNP		UNP	
Choksy, K. N.	NAT		9 March 1989	24 June 1994		UNP		UNP	
Fernando, W. A.	NAT		9 March 1989	24 June 1994		UNP		UNP	
Robertson, Alec	NAT		9 March 1989	24 June 1994		UNP		UNP	
?	NAT		9 March 1989	24 June 1994		UNP		UNP	
?	NAT		9 March 1989	24 June 1994		UNP		UNP	
?	NAT		9 March 1989	24 June 1994		UNP		UNP	
?	NAT		9 March 1989	24 June 1994		UNP		UNP	
?	NAT		9 March 1989	24 June 1994		UNP		UNP	
?	NAT		9 March 1989	24 June 1994		UNP		UNP	
?	NAT		9 March 1989	24 June 1994		USA		USA	
?	NAT		9 March 1989	24 June 1994	SLMC		SLMC		
Silva, Mervin (Not to be confused with Silva, Mervyn)	NAT		9 March 1989	24 June 1994	SLFP		SLFP		
Karunanayake, Kamal	NAT		9 March 1989	24 June 1994	SLFP		SLFP		
Azwer, A. H. M.	NAT		9 March 1989	24 June 1994	SLFP		SLFP		
?	NAT		9 March 1989	24 June 1994	SLFP		SLFP		
?	NAT		9 March 1989	24 June 1994	SLFP		SLFP		
?	NAT		9 March 1989	24 June 1994	SLFP		SLFP		
?	NAT		9 March 1989	24 June 1994	SLFP		SLFP		
?	NAT		9 March 1989	24 June 1994	SLFP		SLFP		
