= 2002 in Sri Lanka =

- Decades: 1980s; 1990s; 2000s; 2010s; 2020s
- See also: Other events of 2002; Timeline of Sri Lankan history

The following lists events that happened during 2002 in Sri Lanka.

== Incumbents ==
- President: Chandrika Kumaratunga
- Prime Minister: Ranil Wickremesinghe
- Chief Justice: Sarath N. Silva

=== Governors ===
- Central Province – K. B. Ratnayake (until 27 June); Monty Gopallawa (starting 27 June)
- North Central Province – G. M. S. Samaraweera
- North Eastern Province – Asoka Jayawardena
- North Western Province – Siripala Jayaweera
- Sabaragamuwa Province – C. N. Saliya Mathew
- Southern Province – Ananda Dassanayake (until January); Kingsley Wickramaratne (starting 1 February)
- Uva Province – Sirisena Amarasiri
- Western Province – Pathmanathan Ramanathan (until 1 February); Alavi Moulana (starting 1 February)

=== Chief Ministers ===
- Central Province – Sarath Ekanayake (until 30 April); W. M. P. B. Dissanayake (starting 30 April)
- North Central Province – Berty Premalal Dissanayake
- North Western Province – S. B. Nawinne (until 2002); Athula Wijesinghe (starting 2002)
- Sabaragamuwa Province – Mohan Ellawala
- Southern Province – H. G. Sirisena
- Uva Province – Aththintha Marakalage Buddhadasa
- Western Province – Reginald Cooray

== Events ==
- Hikkaduwa National Park is established on 19 September 2002, this was done to protect the aquatic ecosystem. Formerly a wildlife sanctuary, it now serves as a national tourist attraction full of diverse wildlife.
- Sri Lanka participates in the 2002 Asian Games held in South Korea, from September 29 to October 14, 2002. The Sri Lankan athletes won 2 gold medals (grand total of 6), and achieved 21st spot in the event.

== Notes ==
a. Gunaratna, Rohan. (1998). Pg.353, Sri Lanka's Ethnic Crisis and National Security, Colombo: South Asian Network on Conflict Research. ISBN 955-8093-00-9
