= 2003 in Sri Lanka =

- Decades: 1980s; 1990s; 2000s; 2010s; 2020s
- See also: Other events of 2003; Timeline of Sri Lankan history

The following lists events that happened during 2003 in Sri Lanka.

== Incumbents ==
- President: Chandrika Kumaratunga
- Prime Minister: Ranil Wickremesinghe
- Chief Justice: Sarath N. Silva

=== Governors ===
- Central Province – Monty Gopallawa
- North Central Province – G. M. S. Samaraweera (until 27 August); Jagath Balasuriya (starting 27 August)
- North Eastern Province – Asoka Jayawardena
- North Western Province – Siripala Jayaweera
- Sabaragamuwa Province – C. N. Saliya Mathew
- Southern Province – Kingsley Wickramaratne
- Uva Province – Sirisena Amarasiri (until 25 April); Nanda Mathew (starting 25 April)
- Western Province – Alavi Moulana

=== Chief Ministers ===
- Central Province – W. M. P. B. Dissanayake (until 29 May); Wasantha Aluvihare (starting 5 June)
- North Central Province – Berty Premalal Dissanayake
- North Western Province – Athula Wijesinghe
- Sabaragamuwa Province – Mohan Ellawala
- Southern Province – H. G. Sirisena
- Uva Province – Aththintha Marakalage Buddhadasa
- Western Province – Reginald Cooray

== Events ==
- Tropical cyclone Very Severe Cyclonic Storm BOB 01 takes aim at Sri Lanka making landfall on 16 May 2003, the storm produced record amounts of rainfall and led to severe flooding in more low elevation areas of the nation. The storm would end up displacing 800,000 residents as a result of the severe flooding.
- In October 2003, the LTTE issues a proposal known as the Interim Self Governing Authority. Once approved, it will assure the LTTE governance of the eastern areas of Sri Lanka, getting them closer to establishing an independent Tamil Eelam.

== Notes ==
a. Gunaratna, Rohan. (1998). Pg.353, Sri Lanka's Ethnic Crisis and National Security, Colombo: South Asian Network on Conflict Research. ISBN 955-8093-00-9
