= 2000 in Sri Lanka =

- Decades: 1980s; 1990s; 2000s; 2010s; 2020s
- See also: Other events of 2000; Timeline of Sri Lankan history

The following lists events that happened during 2000 in Sri Lanka.

== Incumbents ==
- President: Chandrika Kumaratunga
- Prime Minister: Sirimavo Bandaranaike (until 9 August); Ratnasiri Wickremanayake (starting 10 August)
- Chief Justice: Sarath N. Silva

=== Governors ===
- Central Province – Stanley Tillekeratne (until 1 February); Tudor Dassanayake (starting 1 February)
- North Central Province – G. M. S. Samaraweera
- North Eastern Province – Asoka Jayawardena
- North Western Province – Siripala Jayaweera
- Sabaragamuwa Province – C. N. Saliya Mathew
- Southern Province – Ananda Dassanayake
- Uva Province – Sirisena Amarasiri
- Western Province – K. Vignarajah (until 2 January); Pathmanathan Ramanathan (starting 21 January)

=== Chief Ministers ===
- Central Province – Nandimithra Ekanayake (until 6 November); Sarath Ekanayake (starting 6 November)
- North Central Province – Berty Premalal Dissanayake
- North Western Province – S. B. Nawinne
- Sabaragamuwa Province – Athauda Seneviratne (until October); Asoka Jayawardena (starting October)
- Southern Province – Mahinda Yapa Abeywardena
- Uva Province – Samaraweera Weerawanni
- Western Province – Susil Premajayanth (until 9 November); Reginald Cooray (starting 9 November)

== Events ==
- Susanthika Jayasinghe won a bronze medal in the women's 200m at the 2000 Sydney Olympics, the first Olympic medal won by a Sri Lankan woman. Subsequent investigations revealed that the bronze medal won by Susanthika Jayasinghe was converted to a silver medal due to Marianne Jones, an American who won the gold medal in that event, being found guilty of a prohibited stimulant offense.
- On 24 October 2000, President Chandrika Kumaratunga called for a parliamentary election, following harsh criticism regarding the Sri Lankan Civil War. The turnout went in favor of Chandrika, winning a total of 107 seats. The elections were marred by violence. Seventy people were killed during the campaign, including six on election day itself.
- On 25 December 2000, a Tropical Cyclone hit Sri Lanka causing nine fatalities and millions in property damage. This marked the largest cyclone to have hit Sri Lanka since 1978.
- In the Spring of 2000, the Liberation Tigers of Tamil Eelam (LTTE) launched a series of successful offensives to retake strategic roads in the northern province. One major victory was the fall of the A9 Highway, which put the LTTE within striking range of the Elephant Pass military garrison.

== Notes ==
a. Gunaratna, Rohan. (1998). Pg.353, Sri Lanka's Ethnic Crisis and National Security, Colombo: South Asian Network on Conflict Research. ISBN 955-8093-00-9
