= Tikiri Kobbekaduwa =

Sri Lankan politician

Honorable Tikiri Kobbekaduwa
- ටිකිරි කොබ්බෑකඩුව

12th Governor of Sabaragamuwa Province
- In office 21 November 2019 – 10 June 2023
- President: Gotabhaya Rajapaksa; Ranil Wickremesinghe
- Preceded by: Dhamma Dissanayake
- Succeeded by: Navin Dissanayake

8th Governor of Central Province
- In office 16 December 2005 – 19 January 2015
- President: Mahinda Rajapaksa
- Preceded by: Monty Gopallawa
- Succeeded by: Surangani Ellawala

Personal details
- Born: Tikiri Banda Kobbekaduwa
- Party: Sri Lanka Freedom Party
- Education: St. Sylvester's College; Trinity College, Kandy
- Occupation: Politician

Tikiri Banda Kobbekaduwa is a Sri Lankan politician who served as the 8th Governor of Sabaragamuwa Province of Sri Lanka from 21 November 2019 to 10 June 2023. He previously served as 8th Governor of the Central Province of Sri Lanka from 16 December 2005 to 19 January 2015. He was the chief organiser of Sri Lanka Freedom Party to the Yatinuwara Electoral. He is the nephew of former Agriculture Minister Hector Kobbekaduwa.

He was educated at Trinity College, Kandy and St. Sylvester's College, Kandy.

Political offices
| Preceded by Jagath Balasuriya (as Acting Governor) | Governor of Central Province; 2005–2015 | Succeeded by Surangani Ellawala |
