= S. H. Mahadiulwewa =

Sri Lankan politician (born 1906)

Hon. S. H. Mahadiulwewa MP

Member of the Ceylon Parliament for Kalawewa
- In office 1947–1956
- Preceded by: seat created
- Succeeded by: M. S. Dissanayake

Personal details
- Born: Seneviratne Herath; 11 November 1906
- Party: United National Party
- Children: Chandra (daughter)

Seneviratne Herath Mahadiulwewa (born 11 November 1906) was a Ceylonese politician.

Mahadiulwewa was elected to the first Parliament of Ceylon at the parliamentary election held in 1947, as the United National Party candidate, for the Kalawewa electorate. He secured 4,621 votes (54.3% of the total vote).

He was re-elected at the 2nd parliamentary election held in May 1952, receiving 5,674 votes (42.7% of the total vote).

At the 3rd parliamentary election held between in April 1956 he contested the Medawachchiya electorate, following the resignation from the UNP of Medawachchiya's sitting member, Maithripala Senanayake, which also allowed Richard Aluvihare, the former Inspector General Police, to run as the UNP candidate in Kalawewa. Both Mahadiulwewa and Aluvihare were unsuccessful in their respective electorates, with Mahadiulwewa losing by 9,560 votes (only securing 10.4% of the total vote) to Senanayake.

Mahadiulwewa re-contested the seat of Medawachchiya at the 4th parliamentary election held on 19 March 1960, where he was again defeated by Senanayake. Mahadiulwewa securing 2,133 votes (17% of the total vote) as opposed to Senanayake's 9,475 votes (76% of the total vote).
