= Hurulle =

Hurulle (Sinhala: හුරුල්ලේ, romanized: Hurullē) is a Sinhalese surname. Notable people with the surname include:

- Edwin Loku Bandara Hurulle (1919–2009), Sri Lankan politician, cabinet minister, provincial governor and diplomat; father of Themiya Loku Bandara Hurulle
- Themiya Loku Bandara Hurulle (born 1952), Sri Lankan politician, non-cabinet minister and engineer

== See also ==
- List of political families in Sri Lanka – Hurulle
- Hurulu Forest Reserve, a designated biosphere reserve located in the Anuradhapura District of Sri Lanka
