= Godage =

Godage (Sinhala: ගොඩගේ, romanized: Goḍagē) is a Sinhalese surname. Notable people with the surname include:

- Sirimevan Godage (died 1962), Ceylonese politician and Member of Parliament (1956–1962)
- Sirisumana Godage (1936–2026), Sri Lankan entrepreneur, book publisher and chairman of Godage International Publishers
