= Niluka Ekanayake =

Sri Lankan politician and astrologer

- නිලූකා ඒකනායක நிலுகா ஏகநாயக்க

Chairperson of the State Timber Corporation
- Incumbent
- Assumed office 9 January 2019
- President: Maithripala Sirisena

9th Governor of Sabaragamuwa Province
- In office 12 April 2018 – 31 December 2018
- President: Maithripala Sirisena
- Preceded by: Marshal Perera
- Succeeded by: Dhamma Dissanayake

10th Governor of Central Province
- In office 17 March 2016 – 11 April 2018
- President: Maithripala Sirisena
- Preceded by: Surangani Ellawala
- Succeeded by: Reginald Cooray

Personal details
- Occupation: Politician; Astrologer

Niluka Ekanayake (Sinhala: නිලූකා ඒකනායක; Tamil: நிலுகா ஏகநாயக்க) is a Sri Lankan politician and astrologer. She was appointed as the 10th Governor of Central Province by President Maithripala Sirisena and served from 17 March 2016 to 11 April 2018. She later served as the 9th Governor of Sabaragamuwa Province from 12 April 2018 to 31 December 2018. In January 2019 she was appointed as Chairman of the State Timber Corporation (STC).

She is the first LGBTQ+ person and first transgender woman to serve as a provincial governor in Sri Lanka, and is considered to be the first openly transgender head of a government in the world.

== See also ==
- List of openly LGBT heads of government
- List of transgender political office-holders

Political offices
Preceded by Marshal Perera	Governor of Central Province; 2016–2018	Succeeded by Dhamma Dissanayake
Preceded by Surangani Ellawala	Governor of Sabaragamuwa Province; 2018–2019	Succeeded by Reginald Cooray
