= Chandra Ranaraja =

First female mayor in Sri Lanka

Mayor of Kandy
- In office 1990–1991
- Preceded by: Tilak Ratnayake
- Succeeded by: Don Edmund Pathirane

Personal details
- Born: Chandra Mahadiulwewa; 1939 Anuradhapura
- Died: 2 March 2016 (aged 76–77) Kandy
- Party: United National Party
- Other political affiliations: Sri Lanka Freedom Party
- Spouse: Shelton Ranaraja
- Children: Premila, Aruni, Siromi, Shamila, Anjali
- Parent(s): S. H. Mahadiulwewa (father)
- Education: Hillwood College

Chandra Ranaraja (née Mahadiulwewa) (1939 – 2 March 2016) was the first female mayor in Sri Lanka, when she was elected the mayor of Kandy in 1990.

The eldest in a family of seven children, Chandra was born in Anuradhapura in 1939. Her grandfather, D. P. B. Mahadiulwewa, was Chairman of the Village Tribunals, which functioned during British colonial times. Her father was S. H. Mahadiulwewa (1906–1988), Kachcheri Mudliyar of Anuradhapura and the member of parliament for Kalawewa between 1947 and 1952.

Chandra was educated at Hillwood College, Kandy and was one of the first women to attend the University of Peradeniya from the Northern Central Province, graduating with a teaching degree in 1961. The first school she taught at was the Holy Family Convent in Anuradhapura. After she married Shelton Ranaraja, (b. 1926 – d. 11 August 2011), the member of parliament for Senkadagala, she moved to Kandy, and taught at the Girls’ High School. She gave up teaching to care for her five daughters: Premila, Aruni (b. 1967), twins Siromi and Shamila, and Anjali.

In 1978 Ranaraja was appointed as a member of the first Council of the University of Peradeniya. She entered local politics and was elected a member of the Kandy Municipal Council. Ranaraja was subsequently elected the Deputy Mayor (1979–1989) and later in 1990, the first female Mayor of Kandy and the first female mayor in Sri Lanka. Ranaraja during and after her tenure on Council was a strong and vocal advocate for the protection and conservation of built heritage in Kandy.

Her daughter Aruni is the Ambassador to the Philippines. Ranaraja died on 2 March 2016 at 77 years old.
