= Minister for Heritage =

Minister for Heritage may refer to:

- Minister for Heritage (New South Wales), Australia
- Minister for Heritage (Western Australia), Australia

== See also ==
- Minister for Culture and the Preservation of Historical and Cultural Heritage of Abkhazia
- Minister for Tourism and Culture (Northern Territory), Australia
- Minister of Canadian Heritage
- Minister of Culture, Heritage, Tourism and Sport (Manitoba), Canada
- Jerusalem Affairs and Heritage Minister of Israel
- Ministry of Cultural Heritage and Activities (Italy)
- Minister for Arts, Culture and Heritage, New Zealand
- Ministry for Culture and Heritage, New Zealand
- Ministry of Heritage and Culture, Oman
- Ministry of Culture and National Heritage (Poland)
- Ministry of National Heritage, Sri Lanka
- Secretary of State for National Heritage, United Kingdom
- Minister for Tourism and Heritage, United Kingdom
