= Ministry of National Heritage =

Government ministry of Sri Lanka

Agency overview
- Formed: 25 July 2005
- Dissolved: 12 January 2015
- Jurisdiction: Sri Lanka
- Employees: 2,778
- Annual budget: Rs 1,598,000 Billion
- Minister responsible: Jagath Balasuriya
- Deputy Minister responsible: Gunaratna Weerakoon
- Agency executive: Nanda Wickramasinghe, Secretary
- Website: heritagemin.gov.lk

The Ministry of National Heritage was the Sri Lankan government ministry responsible for “Identifying and preserving national heritages in Sri Lanka towards the prosperity of our nation and thereby promoting such heritages.”

The Ministry was first established on 25 July 2005 by the Kumaratunga cabinet, as the Ministry for Cultural Affairs and National Heritage, with Mahinda Yapa Abeywardena as Minister. The last minister to hold the portfolio was Jagath Balasuriya, under the Rajapaksa cabinet, following which the ministry was dissolved. National Heritage is now administered by the Ministry of Buddha Sasana, Religious and Cultural Affairs.

== List of ministers ==
Minister of National Heritage of Sri Lanka
- Incumbent; Jagath Balasuriya
- Ministry of National Heritage
- Deputy: Gunaratna Weerakoon
- Website: heritagemin.gov.lk

The Minister of National Heritage is an appointment in the Cabinet of Sri Lanka.

Parties

Sri Lanka Freedom Party United National Party Jathika Jana Balawegaya Jathika Jana Balawegaya

Name	Portrait	Party	Tenure	President
Mahinda Yapa Abeywardena		Sri Lanka Freedom Party	25 July 2005 - 28 January 2007	Chandrika Kumaratunga / Mahinda Rajapaksa
Anura Bandaranaike		Sri Lanka Freedom Party	28 January 2007 – 14 December 2007	Mahinda Rajapaksa
Pavithra Devi Wanniarachchi		Sri Lanka Freedom Party	23 April 2010 – 22 November 2010	Mahinda Rajapaksa
https://www.parliament.lk/en/members-of-parliament/mp-profile/53		Sri Lanka Freedom Party	22 November 2010 – 12 January 2015	Mahinda Rajapaksa

== See also ==
- List of ministries of Sri Lanka
