= List of chief ministers of Southern Province =

Chief Minister of Southern Province
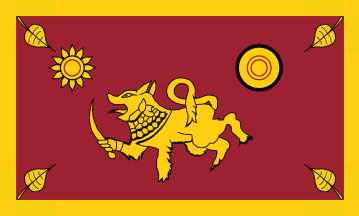
- Flag of Southern Province, Sri Lanka
- Incumbent; Vacant since 26 April 2019
- Board of Ministers of the Southern Province
- Style: The Honourable
- Member of: Southern Provincial Council
- Appointer: Kingsley Wickramaratne
- Inaugural holder: M. S. Amarasiri
- Formation: 3 February 1988
- Website: Southern Provincial Council

The chief minister of Southern Province, Sri Lanka leads the provincial board of ministers, which supports and advises the governor, the head of the provincial government, in exercising executive power. The Governor appoints as Chief Minister the member of the Southern Provincial Council who, in their opinion, commands the support of the majority of the council. The current chief minister is Shan Wijayalal De Silva.

== Chief ministers ==
Sri Lanka Freedom Party United National Party

No.	Name	Portrait	Party	Took office	Left office	Refs
1	M. S. Amarasiri		United National Party	16 June 1988	October 1993	
2	Amarasiri Dodangoda		Sri Lanka Freedom Party	October 1993	January 1994	
	Vacant			January 1994	March 1994	
(2)	Amarasiri Dodangoda		Sri Lanka Freedom Party	March 1994	September 1994	
3	Mahinda Yapa Abeywardena		Sri Lanka Freedom Party	September 1994	21 December 2001	
4	H. G. Sirisena		Sri Lanka Freedom Party	21 December 2001	16 July 2004	
5	Shan Wijayalal De Silva		Sri Lanka Freedom Party	16 July 2004	26 April 2019	
	Vacant			26 April 2019		
