= Nalanda Ellawala =

Sri Lankan politician (1967–1997)

Hon. Nalanda Ellawala

Member of Parliament for Ratnapura
- In office 1994–1997

Personal details
- Born: Nalanda Sampath Ellawala; 26 March 1967
- Died: 11 February 1997 (aged 29) Kuruwita
- Cause of death: Assassination
- Party: Sri Lanka Freedom Party
- Other political affiliations: People's Alliance
- Relations: Nanda (father), Surangani (mother)
- Education: S. Thomas' College, Mount Lavinia
- Occupation: Politician

Nalanda Sampath Ellawala (26 March 1967 – 11 February 1997) was a Sri Lankan politician. He was assassinated in 1997 aged 29.

== Early life and education ==
Nalanda Sampath Ellawala was born 26 March 1967, to the Radala Ellawala family from Ratnapura. His family was active in the Sri Lanka Freedom Party, his father Nanda Ellawala, a member of parliament for Ratnapura (1970–1977), and his mother Surangani Ellawala, later served as the Governor of the Central Province (2015–2016). His father was a cousin of Sirimavo Bandaranaike who was a Prime Minister of Ceylon while another aunt Viollet Ellawala was married to John Hercules Meedeniya, Rate Mahatmaya, uncle of Ranil Wickremesinghe, President of Sri Lanka. Nalanda Ellawala studied at S. Thomas' College, Mount Lavinia.

== Political career ==
Ellawala entered active politics in 1994, when he was elected to the Sabaragamuwa Provincial Council from Sri Lanka Freedom Party. He then succeeded his father as the chief party organizer for the Ratnapura District and contested the 1994 general election in which he was elected to the Parliament of Sri Lanka as one of the youngest members.

== Death ==
Ellawala was mortally wounded in a crossfire between his party supporters which included Dilan Perera and political rivals in Kuruwita. He died at the age of 29, on 11 February 1997. A police constable was also shot dead and an inspector of police fatally wounded. Two members of parliament, Susantha Punchinilame, and Mahinda Ratnatilaka, together with four others (security guards of the two members) were charged with the murder. In December 2013 Punchinilame was cleared of all charges and subsequently released.
