= Maithripala =

Maithripala may refer to

- Maithripala Sirisena, President of Sri Lanka.
- Maithripala Senanayake, Sri Lankan politician.
