= St Joseph's College, Anuradhapura =

St. Joseph's College

Location
- Bulankulama Disa Mawatha, Anuradhapura; Anuradhapura, North Central 50000; Sri Lanka
- Coordinates: 8.3226026°N 80.4123085°E

Information
- Type: National school
- Motto: Duty First
- Religious affiliation: Roman Catholic
- Established: 1898 March 19; 127 years ago
- Principal: M. A. A. Silva
- Staff: 168
- Grades: 1 to 13 (local syllabus)
- Gender: Boys
- Age: 5 to 19
- Language: Sinhala, English
- Houses: Mahaweli, Kelani, Manik, Malwathu
- Colors: Maroon and gold
- Website: https://www.sjc.lk/

St. Joseph's College is a national school for boys, located in Anuradhapura, North Central Province, Sri Lanka.

== History ==
In 1875 the government established the North Central Province by combining Anuradhapura and Polonnaruwa Districts, making Anuradhapura the capital. At that time, there no English medium schools operated in this area. As a result, individuals such as Dr. Bonjune taught English to the local children accompanied by teachers from Jaffna.

Dr. Bonjune began giving English language classes in 1874. By 1898 the Bishop of Jaffna, Henri Joulain, had registered the school as a public English school under the name St. Joseph's College. The school was named after the local Catholic church. The school accepted both Catholic children and children of other religious backgrounds as students.

St. Joseph’s College was originally situated in the old town but later moved to the new town. In 1914 the school changed from a co-educational institute to an all-boys school. The girls of St. Joseph's College were shifted to Holy Family Convent and Swarnapali Balika Vidyalaya.

In its early days, the college had only three teachers and fifty students. In 1920, 1940, and 1968, there were 127, 350 and 450 students respectively. From 1898 to 1936, only J.S.C. classes were held in the school. The college had the capability to present students for E.S.L.C in 1936. When S.S.C. classes were offered in all three languages in 1940, it was the only school in North Central Province to do so.

In 1957 the alumni planned to install a statue of Rev Maurice Legoc, a former director of the school (1919-1940), at a prominent nearby roundabout. A pedestal was constructed, at which Buddhist activists placed a small Buddha the night before the statue was to be erected. Under Sri Lankan law, such a statue cannot be removed once legally installed. The alumni filed a court case but were ultimately unsuccessful, and the statue of Buddha remained on that pedestal.

In 1968 the college became a government school, until then the college was controlled by the Catholic Church. The head of the college, Joseph G. Jayasuriya, became the college's first principal. At that time Marsalin Jayakody wrote the college's current anthem in Sinhala.

By then the college had become a Sinhala school. Tamil students were transferred to Vivekananda Vidyalaya and Sahira Vidyalaya. In 1972 the college was established as a Grade 1AB school. Rogesan Stanislaus was in charge of the college for 34 years, its longest-serving principal (1968–87).

In 2017 the government opened a reverse osmosis water purification plant at the school.

== Past principals ==
- Paul Matthew Francis (1898-1900)
- Joseph Alphonsus (1900-1903)
- Charles. S. Asirawatham (1908)
- I. B. Gregory (1909-1912)
- J. Hillary (1914-1926)
- Charles Nawarathnam (1926-1928)
- Rathnaswami Tarcisius (1930 – 1932)
- M. Joseph Nicolas (1932-1938)
- Balasundaram (1939-1940)
- B. Deogpilli (1946-1951)
- P. A. J. B. Antoninus (1952)
- Francis. J. Staninless (1953-1957)
- T. A. Mathuranayagam (1957-1965)
- M. J. Mariampillai (1959)
- Alfred (1961)
- Joseph G. Jayasuriya (1965-1968)
- Rogesan Stanislus (1968-1987)
- S. B. Illangasinghe (1988-1993)
- T. K. B. Ralapanawa (1993)
- R. M. Upali Ratnayake (2000-2004)
- G. B. S. Weerawickrama (2004-2010)
- R. K. S. Katugampala (2010-2018)
- W. M. Tharusha Madhuranga
- M. A. A. Silva

== Sporting competitions ==
St. Joseph's competes with Anuradhapura Central College in an annual cricket and football competition titled 'The Battle of the Legends.'

== Notable alumni ==
- Maithripala Senanayake - Member of parliament - Medawachchiya (1947-1989)
- Sirimevan Ranasinghe - Vice Admiral, Commander of the Sri Lanka Navy (2017–present)
- Uddika Premarathna - Actor / Member of Parliament - Anuradhapura District (2020–present)
