= Nanda Ellawala =

Ceylonese politician (1939–1994)

Hon. Nanda Ellawala

Member of Parliament for Ratnapura
- In office 1970–1977
- In office 1982–1989

Personal details
- Born: 13 November 1939
- Died: December 16, 1989 (aged 50)
- Party: Sri Lanka Freedom Party
- Spouse: Surangani Ellawala
- Relations: Sirimavo Bandaranaike
- Children: Nalanda Ellawala
- Occupation: Politics

Nanda Sydney Ellawala (13 November 1939 – 1994) was a Ceylonese politician. He was a Member of Parliament from the Ratnapura electorate.

== Early life and family ==
He was born to Robert Sydney Ellawala and Mallika Kobbekaduwa of the Radala Ellawala family. A descendent of William Ellawala, he was a cousin of Sirimavo Bandaranaike who would become Prime Minister of Ceylon.

== Political career ==
Nanda Ellawala contested the Ratnapura electorate from the Sri Lanka Freedom Party in the 1970 parliamentary elections winning against P.B. Wijesundara gaining 42,004 votes to 22,633 votes and entered parliament. He was defeated in the 1977 parliamentary elections by the United National Party candidate G. V. Punchinilame by 23,525 votes to 16,002 votes. He was again re-elected to parliament from Ratnapura in the 1989 parliamentary elections and held the seat until his death in 1994, when it was succeeded by his son Nalanda Ellawala who was elected to parliament in the 1994 parliamentary elections, who held the seat until his death in 1997.

== Family ==
He married Surangani Tennekoon. They had two children, Nalanda and Visaka Ellawala.

== See also ==
- List of political families in Sri Lanka
