= Anuradhapura Electoral District (1947–1989) =

Electoral district of Sri Lanka

Anuradhapura electoral district was an electoral district of Sri Lanka between August 1947 and May 1970. The district was named after the town of Anuradhapura in Anuradhapura District, North Central Province. The 1978 Constitution of Sri Lanka introduced the proportional representation electoral system for electing members of Parliament. The existing 160 mainly single-member electoral districts were replaced with 22 multi-member electoral districts. Anuradhapura electoral district was replaced by the Anuradhapura multi-member electoral district at the 1989 general elections, the first under the proportional representation system, though Anuradhapura continues to be a polling division of the multi-member electoral district.

== Members of Parliament ==
Key

Independent SLFP UNP

Election	Member	Party	Term
1947	P. B. Bulankulame	United National Party	1947-52
1952	P. B. Bulankulame	United National Party	1952-56
1956	Sirimewan Godage	Sri Lanka Freedom Party	1956-60
1960 (March)	Sirimewan Godage	Sri Lanka Freedom Party	1960
1960 (July)	Sirimewan Godage	Sri Lanka Freedom Party	1960-62
By-election	K. B. Ratnayake	Sri Lanka Freedom Party	1962-65
1965	K. B. Ratnayake	Sri Lanka Freedom Party	1965-70
1970	K. B. Ratnayake	Sri Lanka Freedom Party	1970-77

== Elections ==
=== 1947 Parliamentary General Election ===
Results of the 1st parliamentary election held between 23 August 1947 and 20 September 1947:

Candidate	Party	Symbol	Votes	%
P. B. Bulankulame		Hand	5,016	71.80
A. Gunesekera		Cup	1,495	21.40
F. P. Senaratne		Cartwheel	350	5.01
Valid Votes			6,861	98.21
Rejected Votes			125	1.79
Total Polled			6,986	100.00
Registered Electors			11,581	
Turnout				60.32

=== 1952 Parliamentary General Election ===
Results of the 2nd parliamentary election held between 24 May 1952 and 30 May 1952:

Candidate	Party	Symbol	Votes	%
Valid Votes				
Rejected Votes				
Total Polled				100.00
Registered Electors				
Turnout				

=== 1956 Parliamentary General Election ===
Results of the 3rd parliamentary election held between 5 April 1956 and 10 April 1956:

Candidate	Party	Symbol	Votes	%
Valid Votes				
Rejected Votes				
Total Polled				100.00
Registered Electors				
Turnout				

=== 1960 (March) Parliamentary General Election ===
Results of the 4th parliamentary election held on 19 March 1960:

Candidate	Party	Symbol	Votes	%
Valid Votes				
Rejected Votes				
Total Polled				100.00
Registered Electors				
Turnout				

=== 1960 (July) Parliamentary General Election ===
Results of the 5th parliamentary election held on 20 July 1960:

Candidate	Party	Symbol	Votes	%
Valid Votes				
Rejected Votes				
Total Polled				100.00
Registered Electors				
Turnout				

=== 1965 Parliamentary General Election ===
Results of the 6th parliamentary election held on 22 March 1965:

Candidate	Party	Symbol	Votes	%
Valid Votes				
Rejected Votes				
Total Polled				100.00
Registered Electors				
Turnout				

=== 1970 Parliamentary General Election ===
Results of the 7th parliamentary election held on 27 May 1970:

Candidate	Party	Symbol	Votes	%
Valid Votes				
Rejected Votes				
Total Polled				100.00
Registered Electors				
Turnout				

=== 1977 Parliamentary General Election ===
Results of the 8th parliamentary election held on 21 July 1977:

Candidate	Party	Symbol	Votes	%
Valid Votes				
Rejected Votes				
Total Polled				100.00
Registered Electors				
Turnout				
