= Surangani Ellawala =

Sri Lankan politician

9th Governor of Central Province
- In office 27 January 2015 – 14 March 2016
- President: Maithripala Sirisena
- Preceded by: Tikiri Kobbekaduwa
- Succeeded by: Niluka Ekanayake

Member of Parliament for Ratnapura
- In office 2000–2001

Personal details
- Born: Surangani Visaka Tennekoon; 1939
- Died: 14 March 2016 (aged 76–77) Kandy, Sri Lanka
- Spouse: Nanda Ellawala
- Children: Visaka, Nalanda

Surangani Visaka Ellawala (1939 – 14 March 2016) was a Sri Lankan politician and Member of Parliament and served as the 9th Governor of the Central Province from 2015 until her death in 2016. She was the first woman to serve in this position.

She was the wife of Nanda Ellawala, who was a member of parliament for Ratnapura, and the mother of Nalanda Ellawala, who succeeded his father as a member of parliament for Ratnapura in 1994.

In 1999, she contested the 1999 Sabaragamuwa Provincial Council elections as a candidate of the People's Alliance (PA) and was successfully elected, winning with a landslide majority of 54,000 preferential votes, the highest number of preferential votes at the election. She was subsequently appointed Minister of Social Services, Probation, Culture, Housing and Cooperatives.

She then ran for a seat in parliament at the 2000 parliamentary elections from the Ratnapura District as a PA candidate. She received 54,517 votes, the fifth highest and was elected as one of the ten members for the seat. She failed to win re-election in 2001 and chose not to run in 2004.

She was appointed as the Governor of the Central Province on 27 January 2015. Ellawala died on 14 March 2016 while serving as governor.

Political offices
| Preceded by Tikiri Kobbekaduwa | Governor of Central Province; 2015–2016 | Succeeded by Niluka Ekanayake |
