= T. B. Poholiyadde =

Ceylonese politician (1890–1956)

Hon. T. B. Poholiyadde Disawwa MBE JP

Member of the Ceylon Parliament for Horowpothana
- In office 1947–1956
- Preceded by: seat created
- Succeeded by: E. L. B. Hurulle

Personal details
- Born: Wasala Bandaranayake Herat Mudiyanse Ralahamillage Tikiri Banda Poholiyadde; 10 July 1890
- Died: 1956 Ceylon
- Party: United National Party
- Education: Trinity College, Kandy
- Occupation: Politics

Wasala Bandaranayake Herat Mudiyanse Ralahamillage Tikiri Banda Poholiyadde (10 July 1890 - 1956), commonly known as T. B. Poholiyadde Dissawa, was a Ceylonese colonial-era headman and politician.

Poholiyadde was educated at Trinity College, Kandy.

In 1947 Poholiyadde was elected to the Parliament of Ceylon at the 1st parliamentary election, in the Horowpothana electorate, representing the United National Party. He secured 44% of the total vote, defeating the Lanka Sama Samaja Party candidate, P. M. K. Tennakoon, by 2,179 votes.

He was re-elected at the 2nd parliamentary elections in 1952, winning by 1,510 votes over Tennakoon, receiving 4,766 votes (48% of the total vote).

He was awarded the honorary title of Dissawa, appointed justice of the peace and in the 1953 New Year Honours Poholiyadde was appointed as a Member of the Order of the British Empire (MBE) Civil Division.

Poholiyadde died in 1956, at the age of 66, following the dissolution of parliament and before nominations were called. He was successfully replaced by E. L. B. Hurulle.
