= Lalith U. Gamage =

16th Governor of Central Province, Sri Lanka

- ලලිත් යූ. ගමගේ
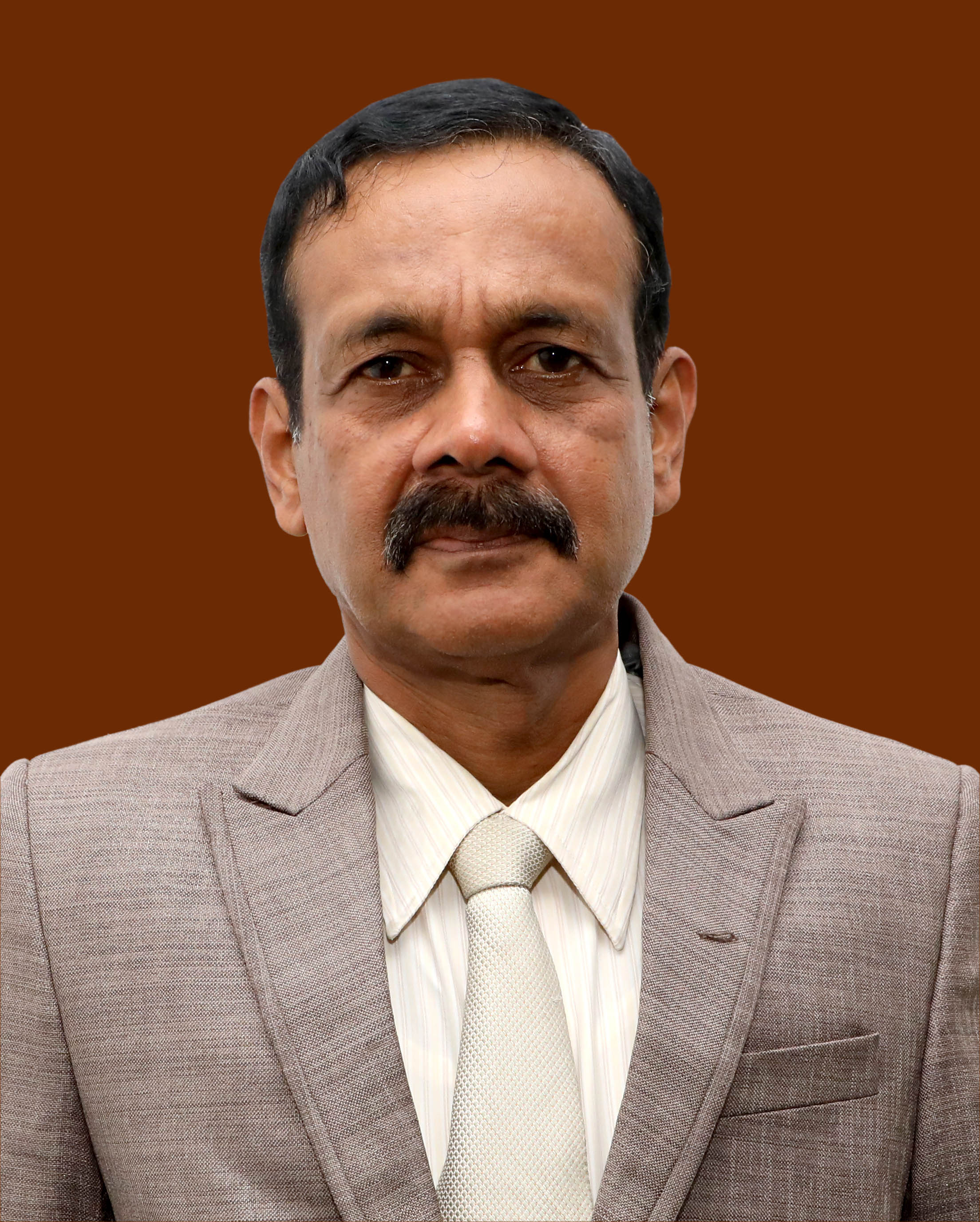

16th Governor of Central Province
- In office 21 November 2019 – 22 September 2024
- Preceded by: Keerthi Thennakoon
- Succeeded by: Sarath Abeykoon

Lalith U. Gamage is a Sri Lankan civil servant who served as the 16th Governor of Central Province from 21 November 2019 to 22 September 2024.
