= E. L. B. Hurulle =

Sri Lankan politician (1919–2009)

Hon. Deshamanya Edwin Hurulle
- එඩ්වින් හුරුල්ලේ
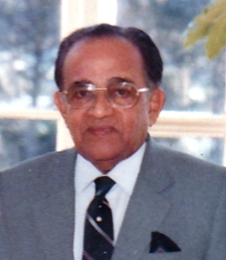

3rd Governor of North Central Province
- In office 11 May 1994 – September 1994
- President: Dingiri Banda Wijetunga
- Preceded by: E. L. Senanayake
- Succeeded by: Maithripala Senanayake

Sri Lankan High Commissioner to Australia

1st Governor of Central Province
- In office June 1988 – 1 February 1990
- President: J. R. Jayewardene; Ranasinghe Premadasa
- Preceded by: Office created
- Succeeded by: P. C. Imbulana

Minister of Cultural Affairs
- In office 23 July 1977 – 1989
- President: J. R. Jayewardene
- Prime Minister: J. R. Jayewardene
- Succeeded by: W. J. M. Lokubandara

Minister of Communications
- In office March 1965 – 31 May 1970
- Prime Minister: Dudley Senanayake
- Succeeded by: Leslie Goonewardena

Member of Parliament for Horawupotana
- In office 1977–1988
- Preceded by: T.B. Herath
- Succeeded by: Constituency Abolished
- In office 1956–1970
- Preceded by: T. B. Poholiyadde
- Succeeded by: T.B. Herath

Personal details
- Born: 19 January 1919 British Ceylon
- Died: 6 April 2009 (aged 90) Sri Lanka
- Party: United National Party
- Spouse: Malinee Hurulle (née Galagoda)
- Children: Maya, Deepthi, Themiya, Vajira, Kanishka
- Education: St. Patrick's College, Jaffna; Trinity College, Kandy
- Profession: Politician

Deshamanya Edwin Loku Bandara Hurulle (Sinhala: එඩ්වින් ලොකු බණඩාර හුරුල්ලේ) (19 January 1919 – 6 April 2009) (known as E. L. B. Hurulle) was a Sri Lankan politician. He was the provincial governor of the Central Province and North Central Province; cabinet minister of communications in Prime Minister Dudley Senanayake's government; cabinet minister of cultural affairs under President J. R. Jayewardene's government and member of parliament.

== Early life and education ==
He was born Illangasinghe Kalukumara Rajakaruna Edwin Loku Bandara Hurulle to Tikiri Bandara Hurulle and Alice Bulankulame Hurulle, daughter of Loku Bandara Bulankulame Dissava, who was the Atamasthana Nilame (chief lay custodian of Atamasthana) in Anuradhapura. He was the eldest child in the family. His family had established themselves as local headmen in the Anuradhapura District. His great-grandfather Punchi Bandara Hurulle built a walauwa by the Morakewa Reservoir in Horowpotana. His grandfather Henarath Bandara Hurulle, who was the Rate Mahatmaya of Hurulupalatha built his two-storeyed walauwa in 1900 A.D. between the Morakewa Weva and the Anuradhapura – Trincomalee Main Road. Henarath Banda Hurulle had married Maningamuwe Weragama Kumarihamy. This was the building set ablaze by the JVP during the insurgency in 1988.

He completed his primary and secondary education at St Patrick's College, Jaffna and Trinity College, Kandy where he passed the London Inter – Arts Examination.

== Government Service ==
Hurulle followed the family tradition by joining government service in the Native Department as an Acting Rate Mahatmaya. With the abolition of the Native Department and formation of the Divisional Revenue Officers (DRO) who replaced the Rate Mahatmayas in the Kandyan areas and the Korale Mudliyars in the Low Country; Hurulle became a DRO in Hurulu Palata in Kahatagasdigiliya in the North Central Province.

== Political career ==
Following the death of T. B. Poholiyadde Dissawa, prior to handing over nominations for the 1956 general election, Hurulle's name was presented for the Horowpotana electorate from the United National Party (UNP) and he resigned from government service. In the election that followed the UNP was reduced to eight parliamentary seats with the Mahajana Eksath Peramuna gaining a landslide victory. His maternal uncle P.B. Bulankulame Dissava who had served in the Cabinet could not retain his seat in parliament at this election.

He was re-elected in the March 1960 general election, the July 1960 general election, the 1965 general election and was appointed to the Cabinet as Minister of Communications in 1965, serving till 1970. As Minister of Communications he expedited the change in Ceylon Government Railways to Diesel Engines by replacing the outdated steam engines. He inducted the Trident Passenger Jet Airplane to Air Ceylon thus taking Air Ceylon from a propeller driven era to a Jet engine era. He also introduced Motor Car Taxis for the first time to Ceylon which were permitted to be imported free of customs duty. He lost his seat in the 1970 general election to T. B. Herath. He was re-elected in the 1977 general election and was appointed Cabinet Minister of Cultural Affairs. As Minister of Cultural Affairs he facilitated assistance from UNESCO in Paris to set up the Central Cultural Fund and formalize Sri Lanka's Cultural Triangle Project. He expedited archeological excavation work at archeological sites resulting in the finding of many rare archeological artefacts. The completion of the Sinhala dictionary (expected to take a further 20 years) was also expedited during his tenure of office. The translations of the Tripiṭaka and the Quran to Sinhala were also carried out during his period of office. He was succeeded by his son Themiya Loku Bandara Hurulle in the 1989 general election.

He was Governor of the Central Province in 1988, where he ensured the setting up and operation of the Central Provincial Council for the first time when Provincial Council related persons were being killed and injured by the armed insurgents in the South of Sri Lanka who were opposed to the Provincial Council system. He thereafter served as Sri Lankan High Commissioner in Australia where encouraged Sri Lankans of all races and religions living in Australia to have a Sri Lankan identity. Countered the anti-Sri Lanka campaigns of pro – LTTE activists by meeting Australian Politicians, Officials and used the Australian Media to explain the true situation in Sri Lanka. His final appointment was Governor of the North Central Province from which he retired in 1994. In 1992, he was awarded the national honor of Deshamanya by the government of Sri Lanka.

== Family ==
He married Malinee Galagoda, the youngest daughter of Madduma Bandara Galagoda of Galagoda Walauwa, Teldeniya, a Basnayake Nilame (Chief custodian) of the Naatha-Devalay, Kandy and a former Officer of the Department of Forests. E.L.B. Hurulle and his wife Malinee had two daughters Maya and Deepthi and three sons Themiya (ex-Project Minister of Science & Technology, ex-Member, North Central Provincial Council and former Director-General, Telecommunications Regulatory Commission of Sri Lanka), Vajira and Kanishka.

== See also ==
- List of political families in Sri Lanka
- List of Sri Lankan non-career diplomats

Political offices
| Preceded by E. L. Senanayake | Governor of North Central Province; 1994 | Succeeded by Maithripala Senanayake |
| Preceded by Office created | Governor of Central Province; 1988–1990 | Succeeded by P. C. Imbulana |
