= Harsha Suranga Fernando =

Sri Lankan physician and politician

The Honourable Harsha Suranga Fernando
- හර්ෂ සුරංග ප්‍රනාන්දු; ஹர்ஷா சுரங்கா பெர்னாண்டோ

18th Governor of the Central Province
- Incumbent
- Assumed office 5 August 2026
- President: Anura Kumara Dissanayake
- Prime Minister: Harini Amarasuriya
- Preceded by: Sarath Abeykoon

Personal details
- Born: Harsha Suranga Fernando
- Education: University of Peradeniya (MBBS); Dharmaraja College
- Profession: Physician

Harsha Suranga Fernando is a Sri Lankan physician and a politician who has served as the 18th governor of the Central Province since 5 August 2026.

== Career ==
Fernando is an alumnus of Dharmaraja College, Kandy. He graduated from the University of Peradeniya with a MBBS degree and served as a community health physician in the Kandy, Matale and Kegalle districts. He has conducted research in affiliation with the Monash Centre for Occupational and Environmental Health in Australia and has also served as an immunisation specialist with the World Health Organization in Timor-Leste and Indonesia.

He was appointed as the 18th governor of the Central Province on 5 August 2026 by President Anura Kumara Dissanayake, filling the vacancy created by the resignation of the previous governor Sarath Abeykoon.
