= Sarath Abeykoon =

Former Vice Chancellor of the University of Peradeniya

Professor Sarath Bandara Samarasinghe Abayakon
- සරත් බණ්ඩාර සමරසිංහ අබයකෝන් சரத் பண்டார சமரசிங்க அபயகோன்

17th Governor of the Central Province
- In office 25 September 2024 – 5 August 2026
- President: Anura Kumara Dissanayake
- Prime Minister: Harini Amarasuriya
- Preceded by: Lalith U. Gamage
- Succeeded by: Harsha Suranga Fernando

Vice Chancellor of University of Peradeniya
- In office 1 August 2009 – 31 July 2012
- Preceded by: H. Abeygunawardena
- Succeeded by: A. Senaratne
- Website: Central Province website

Sarath Bandara Samarasinghe Abayakon is a Sri Lankan professor who served as the 17th Governor of the Central Province of Sri Lanka from 25 September 2024 till 5 August 2026. He previously served as the 19th Vice Chancellor of the University of Peradeniya from 2009 to 2012.

On 15 July 2026, Abeykoon stated that he had tendered his resignation from the post of governor several days earlier due to personal reasons and was awaiting a response from the president. On 5 August, he was succeeded as governor of the Central Province by Harsha Suranga Fernando.
