= R. B. Ratnamalala =

Sri Lankan politician (1912–1974)

Ran Banda Ratnamalala (13 December 1912 – 1974) was a Sri Lankan politician. He was the member of Parliament of Sri Lanka from Kalawewa representing the Sri Lanka Freedom Party.

He was elected to parliament from Kalawewa in the March 1960 general election and was re-elected in the July 1960 general election, the 1965 general election and the 1970 general election. On his death, A. M. S. Adikari succeeded him having been elected in a by-election.
