= A. M. S. Adikari =

Sri Lankan politician

A. M. S. Adikari

Adikari Mudiyanselage Somapala Adikari (24 November 1935 - 19 December 2015) was a Sri Lankan politician. He was the Minister of Posts and Telecommunications, Minister of Tourism and the member of Parliament of Sri Lanka from Kalawewa representing the United National Party.

Adikari was elected to parliament from Kalawewa in a by election in 1974 following the death of R. B. Ratnamalala. He was re-elected 1977 general election.
