= Shan Wijayalal De Silva =

Sri Lankan politician

Hon. Gustinha Wadu Shan Wijayalal De Silva
- ෂාන් විජයලාල් ද සිල්වා ஷான் விஜயலால் த சில்வா

Member of Parliament for Galle District
- In office 15 August 2020 – 24 September 2024
- Majority: 67,793 preferential votes

5th Governor of Eastern Province
- In office 5 June 2019 – 16 November 2019
- Preceded by: M. L. A. M. Hizbullah
- Succeeded by: Anuradha Yahampath

5th Chief Minister of Southern Province
- In office 16 July 2004 – 26 April 2019
- Preceded by: H. G. Sirisena

Personal details
- Born: Shan Wijayalal De Silva; 17 August 1959 (age 67) Ambalangoda, Sri Lanka
- Citizenship: Sri Lankan
- Party: Samagi Jana Balawegaya (since 2024)
- Other political affiliations: Sri Lanka Freedom Party (until 2024)
- Children: 2
- Education: Dharmasoka College, Ambalangoda
- Occupation: Politician
- Profession: Custom Officer

Shan Wijayalal De Silva (born 17 August 1959) is a Sri Lankan politician and former member of parliament for the Galle District from 2020 to 2024. Since 1 January 2024, he has belonged to the Samagi Jana Balawegaya. He previously belonged to the Sri Lanka Freedom Party.

He has previously served as Chief Minister of the Southern Province from 2004 to 2019. Less than two months after leaving the office, Shan Wijayalal De Silva was sworn in as Governor of the Eastern Province, and served for five months from 5 June to 16 November 2019.

== Corruption allegations ==
On 10 June 2026, De Silva was arrested by the Commission to Investigate Allegations of Bribery or Corruption (CIABOC) over allegations of corruption amounting to Rs. 16.5 million (approximately US$48,910) in 2019 and procurement irregularities. Subsequently he was remanded until 12 June 2026 by the Colombo Chief Magistrate's Court.
