= Nalini Weerawanni =

Sri Lankan politician

Nalini Weerawanni is a Sri Lankan politician. She was the Chief Minister of Uva Province in Sri Lanka in April 1999 till her husband Samaraweera Weerawanni resigned from the Sri Lankan Parliament and became the Chief Minister.
