= M. S. Dissanayake =

Sri Lankan politician

Mudiyansege Suddahamy Dissanayake was a Ceylonese politician. He was the member of the Parliament of Sri Lanka for Kalawewa, representing the Sri Lanka Freedom Party and defeating Sir Richard Aluvihare of the United National Party at the 3rd parliamentary election.
