= Sirimevan Godage =

Ceylonese politician

Sirimevan Godage (?? - 1962) was a Ceylonese politician. He was a member of parliament from 1956 to 1962 from Anuradhapura

A former office assistant, Godage contested the 1956 general election from the Sri Lanka Freedom Party in Anuradhapura and won against the incumbent and Cabinet Minister of Lands and Land Development P. B. Bulankulame Dissawa. He was re-elected in the March 1960 general election and July 1960 general election, holding office until his death in 1962. K. B. Ratnayake succeeded his seat.
