= P. B. Bulankulame =

Sri Lankan politician

Hon. P. B. Bulankulame Dissawa OBE, JP

Member of the Ceylon Parliament for Anuradhapura
- In office 1947–1956
- Preceded by: seat created
- Succeeded by: Sirimewan Godage

Personal details
- Born: Sooriyakumara Wannisinghe Punchi Banda Bulankulame; 12 December 1890 Anuradhapura
- Died: 17 December 1958 (aged 68) Ceylon
- Party: United National Party
- Education: Royal College, Colombo
- Occupation: Politics
- Profession: Proctor

Sooriyakumara Wannisinghe Punchi Banda Bulankulame, OBE, JP (known as P. B. Bulankulame or Tikiri Bandara Bulankulama Dissawa) (12 December 1890 - 17 December 1958) was a Ceylonese politician, who was the former Cabinet Minister of Lands and Land Development in Dudley Senanayake's and John Kotelawala's government.

== Education and legal career ==
Educated at the Royal College Colombo where he played in the Royal-Thomian. He then studied law at the Ceylon Law College becoming a Proctor. Having established his legal practice in his home town of Anuradhapura, he was later appointed a Justice of Peace.

== Political career ==
Bulankulame was elected to the 2nd State Council of Ceylon on 21 April 1944, following the death of the sitting member, H. R. Freeman. In 1947 he was elected in the 1947 general election from Anuradhapura to first Parliament of Ceylon. In the first government since independence, he was appointed as Parliamentary Secretary to the Minister of Agriculture and Lands. He was re-elected in the 1952 general election and was appointed Cabinet Minister Lands and Land Development in the cabinet of Sir John Kotelawala, serving till 1956. He lost his seat in the 1956 general election to Sirimewan Godage.

== Honors ==
He was awarded the title of Dissawa of Anuradhapura by the British Governor of Ceylon. He was appointed Member of the Most Excellent Order of the British Empire (MBE) in the 1949 New Year Honours and later made an Officer of the Most Excellent Order of the British Empire in the 1951 Birthday Honours. The Bulankulama Disawa Mawatha in Anuradhapura is named after him.

== See also ==
- List of political families in Sri Lanka
