= Stanley Tillekeratne =

Sri Lankan politician (1928–2005)

Hon. Stanley Tillekeratne

10th Speaker of the Parliament
- In office 7 June 1970 – 18 May 1977
- Prime Minister: Sirimavo Bandaranaike
- Preceded by: Shirley Corea
- Succeeded by: Anandatissa de Alwis

4th Governor of Central Province
- In office May 1998 – 2000
- President: Chandrika Kumaratunga
- Prime Minister: Sirimavo Bandaranaike
- Preceded by: E. L. Senanayake
- Succeeded by: Tudor Dassanayake

Personal details
- Born: 3 August 1928
- Died: 2 June 2005 (aged 76)
- Education: Kalutara Vidyalaya; St. Benedict's College, Colombo
- Occupation: Politician

Stanley Tillekeratne (Sinhala: ස්ටැන්ලි තිලකරත්න; 3 August 1928 – 2 June 2005) was a Sri Lankan politician. He was the Speaker of the Sri Lankan Parliament and later was the Governor of the Central Province of Sri Lanka from May 1998 to 2000.

Stanley Tillekeratne had a long liaison with the country's Left movement from 1947 before joining the Sri Lanka Freedom Party in 1965. He contested and won Kotte on the Communist Party ticket at the July 1960 elections and retained the seat in 1965 for the SLFP. He was reelected in 1970 and was made speaker of parliament, in which role he won the admiration even of his opponents for the impartial manner in which he conducted the affairs of the House. Along with many of the SLFP stalwarts he too suffered defeat at the 1977 poll, but he succeeded in remaining in the public eye as a champion human rights lawyer, especially during the turbulent period of 1989-90. He figured in several groundbreaking cases. At the 1989 elections he was returned to parliament from Colombo district and remained as an MP until his exit in 1994. He was governor of Central province in 1994-2000.

Political offices
Preceded by E. L. Senanayake	Governor of Central Province; 1998–2000	Succeeded by Tudor Dassanayake
