= Kalawewa Electoral District =

Electoral district of Sri Lanka

Kalawewa electoral district was an electoral district of Sri Lanka between August 1947 and February 1989. The district was named after the town of Kalawewa in Anuradhapura District, North Central Province. The 1978 Constitution of Sri Lanka introduced the proportional representation electoral system for electing members of Parliament. The existing 160 mainly single-member electoral districts were replaced with 22 multi-member electoral districts. Kalawewa electoral district was replaced by the Anuradhapura multi-member electoral district at the 1989 general elections, the first under the proportional representation system, though Anuradhapura continues to be a polling division of the multi-member electoral district.

== Members of Parliament ==
Key

Independent SLFP UNP

Election	Member	Party	Term
1947	S. H. Mahadiulwewa	UNP	1947-1952
1952	S. H. Mahadiulwewa	UNP	1952-1956
1956	M. S. Dissanayake	SLFP	1956-1960
1960 (March)	R. B. Ratnamalala	SLFP	1960
1960 (July)	R. B. Ratnamalala	SLFP	1960-1965
1965	R. B. Ratnamalala	SLFP	1965-1970
1970	R. B. Ratnamalala	SLFP	1970-1977
1977	A. M. S. Adikari	UNP	1977-1989

== Elections ==
=== 1947 Parliamentary General Election ===
Results of the 1st parliamentary election held between 23 August 1947 and 20 September 1947:

Candidate	Party	Symbol	Votes	%
S. H. Mahadiulwewa		Elephant	4,621	54.31
S. B. Ratwatte		Hand	3,730	43.84
Valid Votes			8,351	98.16
Rejected Votes			157	1.84
Total Polled			8,508	100.00
Registered Electors			15,957	
Turnout				53.32

=== 1952 Parliamentary General Election ===
Results of the 2nd parliamentary election held between 24 May 1952 and 30 May 1952:

Candidate	Party	Symbol	Votes	%
S. H. Mahadiulwewa		Elephant	5,674	42.72
S. B. Ratwatte		Star	4,137	31.15
Asoka Jayaratne		Key	2,894	2.18
Percy Alwin Abeykoon		Hand	333	2.51
Valid Votes			13,038	98.16
Rejected Votes			245	1.84
Total Polled			13,283	100.00
Registered Electors			19,521	
Turnout				68.04

=== 1956 Parliamentary General Election ===
Results of the 3rd parliamentary election held between 5 April 1956 and 10 April 1956:

Candidate	Party	Symbol	Votes	%
M. S. Dissanayake	Sri Lanka Freedom Party	Hand	12,418	65.31
Richard Aluvihare	United National Party	Elephant	6,449	33.92
Valid Votes			18,867	99.23
Rejected Votes			146	0.77
Total Polled			19,013	100.00
Registered Electors			24,594	
Turnout				77.31

=== 1960 (March) Parliamentary General Election ===
Results of the 4th parliamentary election held on 19 March 1960:

Candidate	Party	Symbol	Votes	%
R. B. Ratnamalala	Sri Lanka Freedom Party	Hand		
Valid Votes				
Rejected Votes				
Total Polled				100.00
Registered Electors				
Turnout				

=== 1960 (July) Parliamentary General Election ===
Results of the 5th parliamentary election held on 20 July 1960:

Candidate	Party	Symbol	Votes	%
Valid Votes				
Rejected Votes				
Total Polled				100.00
Registered Electors				
Turnout				

=== 1965 Parliamentary General Election ===
Results of the 6th parliamentary election held on 22 March 1965:

Candidate	Party	Symbol	Votes	%
Valid Votes				
Rejected Votes				
Total Polled				100.00
Registered Electors				
Turnout				

=== 1970 Parliamentary General Election ===
Results of the 7th parliamentary election held on 27 May 1970:

Candidate	Party	Symbol	Votes	%
Valid Votes				
Rejected Votes				
Total Polled				100.00
Registered Electors				
Turnout				

=== 1977 Parliamentary General Election ===
Results of the 8th parliamentary election held on 21 July 1977:

Candidate	Party	Symbol	Votes	%
Valid Votes				
Rejected Votes				
Total Polled				100.00
Registered Electors				
Turnout				
