= Medawachchiya Electoral District =

Electoral district of Sri Lanka

Medawachchiya electoral district was an electoral district of Sri Lanka between August 1947 and February 1989. The district was named after the town of Medawachchiya in Anuradhapura District, North Central Province. The 1978 Constitution of Sri Lanka introduced the proportional representation electoral system for electing members of Parliament. The existing 160 mainly single-member electoral districts were replaced with 22 multi-member electoral districts. Medawachchiya electoral district was replaced by the Anuradhapura multi-member electoral district at the 1989 general elections.

During the time of this electorate the sole member of parliament was Maithripala Senanayake.

== Members of Parliament ==
Key

Independent SLFP UNP

Election	Member	Party	Term
1947	Maithripala Senanayake	United National Party	1947 - 1989
1952	Maithripala Senanayake	United National Party	1947 - 1989
1956	Maithripala Senanayake	Sri Lanka Freedom Party	1947 - 1989
1960 (March)	Maithripala Senanayake	Sri Lanka Freedom Party	1947 - 1989
1960 (July)	Maithripala Senanayake	Sri Lanka Freedom Party	1947 - 1989
1965	Maithripala Senanayake	Sri Lanka Freedom Party	1947 - 1989
1970	Maithripala Senanayake	Sri Lanka Freedom Party	1947 - 1989
1977	Maithripala Senanayake	Sri Lanka Freedom Party	1947 - 1989

== Elections ==
=== 1947 Parliamentary General Election ===
Results of the 1st parliamentary election held between 23 August 1947 and 20 September 1947:

Candidate	Party	Symbol	Votes	%
Maithripala Senanayake	United National Party	Hand	3,283	45.20
Ariya Pathirana		Cart Wheel	1,404	19.33
W. Tennakoon		Elephant	1,247	17.17
S. M. U. B. Madukande		Umbrella	1,196	16.47
Valid Votes			7,130	98.17
Rejected Votes			133	1.83
Total Polled			7,263	100.00
Registered Electors			11,400	
Turnout				63.71

=== 1952 Parliamentary General Election ===
Results of the 2nd parliamentary election held between 24 May 1952 and 30 May 1952:

Candidate	Party	Symbol	Votes	%
Maithripala Senanayake	United National Party	Hand	8,112	78.88
Ariya Pathirana		Elephant	2,039	19.83
Valid Votes			10,151	98.71
Rejected Votes			133	1.29
Total Polled			10,284	100.00
Registered Electors			13,351	
Turnout				77.03

=== 1956 Parliamentary General Election ===
Results of the 3rd parliamentary election held between 5 April 1956 and 10 April 1956:

Candidate	Party	Symbol	Votes	%
Maithripala Senanayake	Sri Lanka Freedom Party	Hand	10,829	88.89
S. H. Mahadiulwewa	United National Party	Elephant	1,269	10.42
Valid Votes			12,098	99.30
Rejected Votes			85	0.70
Total Polled			12,183	100.00
Registered Electors			15,492	
Turnout				78.64

=== 1960 (March) Parliamentary General Election ===
Results of the 4th parliamentary election held on 19 March 1960:

Candidate	Party	Symbol	Votes	%
Maithripala Senanayake	Sri Lanka Freedom Party	Hand	9,475	75.92
S. H. Mahadiulwewa	United National Party	Elephant	2,133	17.09
Ariya Pathirana		Cockerel	509	4.08
A. E. O. Weerasinghe		Umbrella	226	1.81
Valid Votes			12,343	98.90
Rejected Votes			137	1.10
Total Polled			12,480	100.00
Registered Electors			16,579	
Turnout				75.28

=== 1960 (July) Parliamentary General Election ===
Results of the 5th parliamentary election held on 20 July 1960:

Candidate	Party	Symbol	Votes	%
Maithripala Senanayake	Sri Lanka Freedom Party	Hand	9,534	79.96
B. K. Piyadasa	United National Party	Elephant	2,236	19.59
Valid Votes			11,770	98.71
Rejected Votes			154	1.29
Total Polled			11,924	100.00
Registered Electors			16,579	
Turnout				71.92

=== 1965 Parliamentary General Election ===
Results of the 6th parliamentary election held on 22 March 1965:

Candidate	Party	Symbol	Votes	%
Maithripala Senanayake	Sri Lanka Freedom Party	Hand	10,839	61.67
D.M. Ariyadasa	United National Party	Elephant	6,108	34.75
M.W.K. Pandula		Sun	264	1.50
W.S.Abhayasinghe		Cart Wheel	156	0.89
Valid Votes			17,420	99.11
Rejected Votes			209	0.89
Total Polled			17,576	100.00
Registered Electors			21,538	
Turnout				81.61

=== 1970 Parliamentary General Election ===
Results of the 7th parliamentary election held on 27 May 1970:

Candidate	Party	Symbol	Votes	%
Maithripala Senanayake	Sri Lanka Freedom Party	Hand	17,094	68.65
D.M. Ariyadasa	United National Party	Elephant	7,496	30.10
W.S.Abhayasinghe		Bell	135	0.54
Valid Votes			24,725	99.29
Rejected Votes			177	0.71
Total Polled			24,902	100.00
Registered Electors			29,245	
Turnout				85.15

=== 1977 Parliamentary General Election ===
Results of the 8th parliamentary election held on 21 July 1977:

Candidate	Party	Symbol	Votes	%
Maithripala Senanayake	Sri Lanka Freedom Party	Hand	14,228	49.67
D.M. Ariyadasa	United National Party	Elephant	13,862	48.39
Edmond Don Siyambalapitiya		Book	435	1.52
Valid Votes			28,525	99.57
Rejected Votes			122	0.43
Total Polled			28,647	100.00
Registered Electors			32,284	
Turnout				88.73
