= Themiya Loku Bandara Hurulle =

Sri Lankan politician

Hon. Themiya Hurulle
- තේමිය හුරුල්ලේ
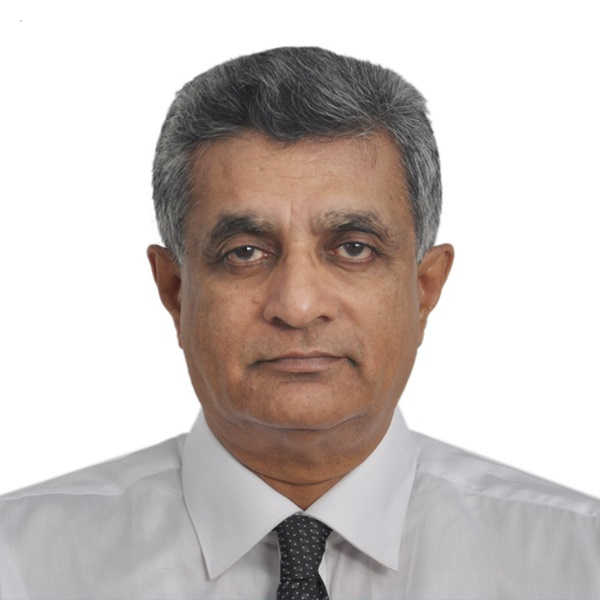

Minister of Science & Technology
- In office 1993–1994
- President: Dingiri Banda Wijetunga

Provincial Councillor, North Central Province
- In office 1999–2001

Director-General, Telecommunications Regulatory Commission of Sri Lanka
- In office 2001–2004

Personal details
- Born: 16 March 1952 (age 74)
- Party: United National Party
- Spouse: Shalini Hurulle (née Gomes)
- Children: Aindri; Ranila; Gayani
- Parent(s): E. L. B. Hurulle (Father); Malinee Hurulle (Mother) (née Galagoda)
- Education: S. Thomas' Preparatory School, Colombo; S. Thomas' College, Mount Lavinia; University of Moratuwa; London South Bank University
- Occupation: Politics
- Profession: Engineer

Themiya Loku Bandara Hurulle (Sinhala: තේමිය ලොකු බණඩාර හුරුල්ලේ; born 16 March 1952) (known as Themiya Hurulle) is a Sri Lankan politician and Honorary Secretary, Anuradhapura Jaya Sri Maha Bodhi Development Fund a former project minister and a United National Party organiser for Horawupotana Electorate. He was also a provincial councillor and a member of Parliament from Anuradhapura District. He is an engineer by profession.

== Early life ==
His father, Edwin Loku Bandara Hurulle was a member of Parliament for Horowpothana from 1956, Cabinet Minister of Communications (1965–1970) and Minister of Cultural Affairs (1977–1988). He served as Governor in the Central Province and the North Central Province. E L B Hurulle also served as Sri Lanka's High Commissioner to in Canberra, Australia. Themiya's mother was Malinee Galagoda Hurulle, the youngest daughter of Madduma Bandara Galagoda of Galagoda Walauwa, Udispattuwa, Teldeniya. Madduma Bandara Galagoda was a Basnayake Nilame (Chief custodian) of the Natha Devale in Kandy. Themiya has two sisters Maya and Deepthi and two brothers Vajira and Kanishka.

== Education ==
Hurulle completed his primary and secondary education at S. Thomas' Preparatory School, Colombo and S. Thomas' College, Mount Lavinia. He thereafter pursued further studies in engineering at the Ceylon Technical College, Moratuwa (now the University of Moratuwa). Having followed the Engineering Apprentices I & II Programmes 1972/1973, he gained admission to London South Bank University in where earned a Diploma in Refrigeration and Air Conditioning in 1977 after which he obtained Membership of the Institute of Refrigeration.

== Engineering career ==
Thereafter, he worked as an Engineer at Metropolitan Refrigeration and Air Conditioning, London EC1 and subsequently at its successor, Metair Ltd., Edmonton, London N12. Having returned to Colombo in 1980, he worked as Senior Engineer and subsequently as the Manager/Chief Engineer of the Air Conditioning & Refrigeration Division in a well known Engineering Company in Colombo. He also worked as executive director of a Company which was the Re-seller for well known brand of Computers that originated in the United States.

== Political career ==
In 1989, he was invited by the United National Party to contest for parliamentary election from Anuradhapura District and was elected a Member of Parliament. In 1993 he was appointed as Project Minister of Science & Technology (Non-Cabinet rank) and worked with the Cabinet Minister of Industries, Science & Technology Ranil Wickremesinghe in the development of ICT, Industries, Science and Technology for Sri Lanka. In 1999 he contested at the North Central Provincial Council Election and was elected a Member of the council from the Anuradhapura District and served in the Council up until 2001. In 2001 he was appointed Director-General of the Telecommunications Regulatory Commission (TRC) where he served until 2004. In 2016 he was appointed to the Public Hearings Committee on Sri Lanka Constitutional Reform to report on the views of the general public on Constitutional Reform which was presented to the President, Prime Minister and the Parliament of Sri Lanka. He currently serves as an independent, non executive Director in a well known Private Bank and also serves on the Committee of The Anuradhapura Jayashrimahabodhi Development Committee which was created by an Act of Parliament in 2014.

== Family ==
Themiya Hurulle is married to Rukmalie Shalini Gomes the youngest daughter of G.B.S.Gomes and Ranee Wijewardene Gomes (G B S Gomes was the managing director of Associated Newspapers of Ceylon Limited) and initiated the lighting up of the Mihintale Stupa for Poson Poya which is even done presently. Themiya has 3 daughters Aindri, Ranila and Gayani who are in the fields of Business & Supply Chain Management, Legal and Economics & Public Policy respectively. The history of the Hurulle Family dates back to King Mahasena's reign in Anuradhapura.

== See also ==
- List of political families in Sri Lanka
