= List of governors of Central Province =

Governor of Central Province
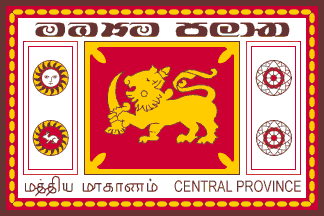
- Flag of Central Province
- Incumbent; Harsha Suranga Fernando since 5 August 2026
- Appointer: President of Sri Lanka
- Term length: 5 years
- Inaugural holder: E. L. B. Hurulle
- Formation: June 1988
- Website: centralprovincegovernor.org

The governor of the Central Province of Sri Lanka (Sinhala: මධ්‍යම පළාත් ආණ්ඩුකාරවරයා; Madhyama palāth āndukāravarayā) is the head of the provincial government and exercises executive power over subjects devolved to the Central Provincial Council. The governor is appointed by the president of Sri Lanka for a period of five years. The current governor is Harsha Suranga Fernando.

== Governors ==
Independent Sri Lanka Freedom Party United National Party

No.	Name	Portrait	Party	Took office	Left office	Refs
1	E. L. B. Hurulle		United National Party	June 1988	1 February 1990	
2	P. C. Imbulana		United National Party	1 February 1990	May 1994	
3	E. L. Senanayake		United National Party	May 1994	1998	
4	Stanley Tillekeratne		Sri Lanka Freedom Party	May 1998	2000	
5	Tudor Dassanayake		Independent	1 February 2000	1 January 2001	
6	K. B. Ratnayake		Sri Lanka Freedom Party	January 2001	27 June 2002	
7	Monty Gopallawa		Sri Lanka Freedom Party	27 June 2002	26 September 2005	
8	Jagath Balasuriya (acting)		Sri Lanka Freedom Party	26 September 2005	16 December 2005	
9	Tikiri Kobbekaduwa		Sri Lanka Freedom Party	16 December 2005	19 January 2015	
10	Surangani Ellawala		Sri Lanka Freedom Party	27 January 2015	14 March 2016	
11	Niluka Ekanayake		Independent	14 March 2016	11 April 2018	
12	Reginald Cooray		Sri Lanka Freedom Party	12 April 2018	13 April 2018	
13	P. B. Dissanayake		Sri Lanka Freedom Party	13 April 2018	3 January 2019	
14	Maithri Gunaratne		Sri Lanka Freedom Party	3 January 2019	3 August 2019	
15	Keerthi Thennakoon		Independent	4 August 2019	20 November 2019	
16	Lalith U. Gamage		Independent	21 November 2019	22 September 2024	
17	Sarath Abeykoon		Independent	25 September 2024	5 August 2026	
18	Harsha Suranga Fernando		Independent	5 August 2026	Incumbent	

== Notes ==
Sources

- "Central Provincial Council – Former Governors". Office of the Council Secretary – Central Provincial Council. 2025.
- "Sri Lanka Provinces from 1988". World Statesman.
