= Eliyathamby Pararasasingam =

Sri Lankan Tamil politician

Hon. Eliyathamby Pararasasingam MP

Member of Parliament for Jaffna
- In office 1989–1994

Personal details
- Party: Eelam Revolutionary Organisation of Students

Eliyathamby Pararasasingam is a Sri Lankan Tamil politician and a Member of Parliament belonging to the Eelam Revolutionary Organisation of Students. He was elected from the Jaffna Electoral District in 1989.
