= Kanapathy Selvanayagam =

Sri Lankan politician

Hon. Kanapathy Selvanayagam MP

Member of Parliament for Jaffna
- In office 1989–1994

Personal details
- Party: Eelam Revolutionary Organisation of Students

Kanapathy Selvanayagam is a Sri Lankan Tamil politician and a Member of Parliament belonging to the Eelam Revolutionary Organisation of Students.He was elected from the Jaffna Electoral District in 1989.
