= Dhamma Dissanayake =

Governor of Sabaragamuwa province in Sri Lanka

Dissanayaka Mudiyanselage Dhamma Dissanayaka was a former Governor of the Sabaragamuwa Province in Sri Lanka.
