= Monty Gopallawa =

Sri Lankan politician (1941–2005)

Hon. Monty Gopallawa

7th Governor of Central Province
- In office 27 June 2002 – 26 September 2005
- Preceded by: Kiri Banda Ratnayake
- Succeeded by: Jagath Balasuriya (as acting Governor)

Minister of Cultural Affairs
- In office 2000–2001
- President: Chandrika Kumaratunga
- Preceded by: Lakshman Jayakody
- Succeeded by: Mahinda Yapa Abeywardena

Member of Parliament for Matale District
- In office 1994–2001

Member of Parliament for Laggala District
- In office 1970–1977
- Preceded by: P. G. Muthubanda
- Succeeded by: J. G. Wijeratne Banda

Personal details
- Born: 16 January 1941 British Ceylon
- Died: 26 September 2005 (aged 64) Colombo, Sri Lanka
- Party: Sri Lanka Freedom Party
- Spouse(s): Nimal Gopallawa (née Kobbekaduwa)
- Children: 2
- Parent(s): William Gopallawa (father); Seelawathie Gopallawa (mother)
- Education: S. Thomas' Preparatory School; University of Ceylon

Moithra Cuda Banda Gopallawa (16 January 1941 – 26 September 2005), commonly known as Monty Gopallawa, was a Sri Lankan politician and Member of Parliament. He served as the 7th Governor of the Central Province from 2002 until his death in 2005.

He served as deputy minister of labour from 1994 to 1997, deputy minister of public works from 1997 to 2000, and as cabinet minister of cultural affairs from 2000 to 2001. He lost his parliamentary seat in the 2001 parliamentary elections. In 2002, he was appointed governor of the Central Province and served in the position until his death.

Gopallawa died on 26 September 2005 at a hospital in Colombo during treatment for an illness.

Gopallawa was the son of William Gopallawa, the last Governor-General of Ceylon and first President of Sri Lanka.

== See also ==
- List of political families in Sri Lanka
- The Gopallawa Ancestry

Political offices
Preceded by K. B. Ratnayake	Governor of Central Province; 2002–2005	Succeeded by Jagath Balasuriya (as Acting Governor)
