= Tudor Dassanayake =

Sri Lankan politician

5th Governor of Central Province
- In office 1 February 2000 – 2001
- President: Chandrika Kumaratunga
- Preceded by: Stanley Tillekeratne
- Succeeded by: Kiri Banda Ratnayake

Personal details
- Died: 21 January 2006
- Party: Independent
- Spouse: Soma Dassanayake
- Children: Indu Dassanayake

Tudor Karunatilleke Dassanayake (died 21 January 2006) was a senior Sri Lankan administrative officer who served as the 5th Governor of the Central Province. He was the first governor of the province to not belong to any political party. He previously served as the Government Agent of the North Central Province.

Political offices
Preceded by Stanley Tillekeratne	Governor of Central Province; 2000–2001	Succeeded by K. B. Ratnayake
