= Jagath Balasuriya =

Sri Lankan politician

Jagath Balasuriya (born 21 November 1940) is a Sri Lankan politician, who was the Minister of National Heritage. He belongs to the Sri Lanka Freedom Party. He was acting Governor of Central Province in 2005 from September to December.

Political offices
Preceded by G. M. S. Samaraweera	Governor of North Central Province; 2003–2006	Succeeded by Karunarathne Diulgane
Preceded by Monty Gopallawa	Governor of Central Province (Acting); 2005	Succeeded by Tikiri Kobbekaduwa
