= Mahinda Yapa Abeywardena =

Sri Lankan politician (born 1945)

Hon. Mahinda Yapa Abeywardana
- මහින්ද යාපා අබේවර්ධන மகிந்த யாப்பா அபேவர்தன
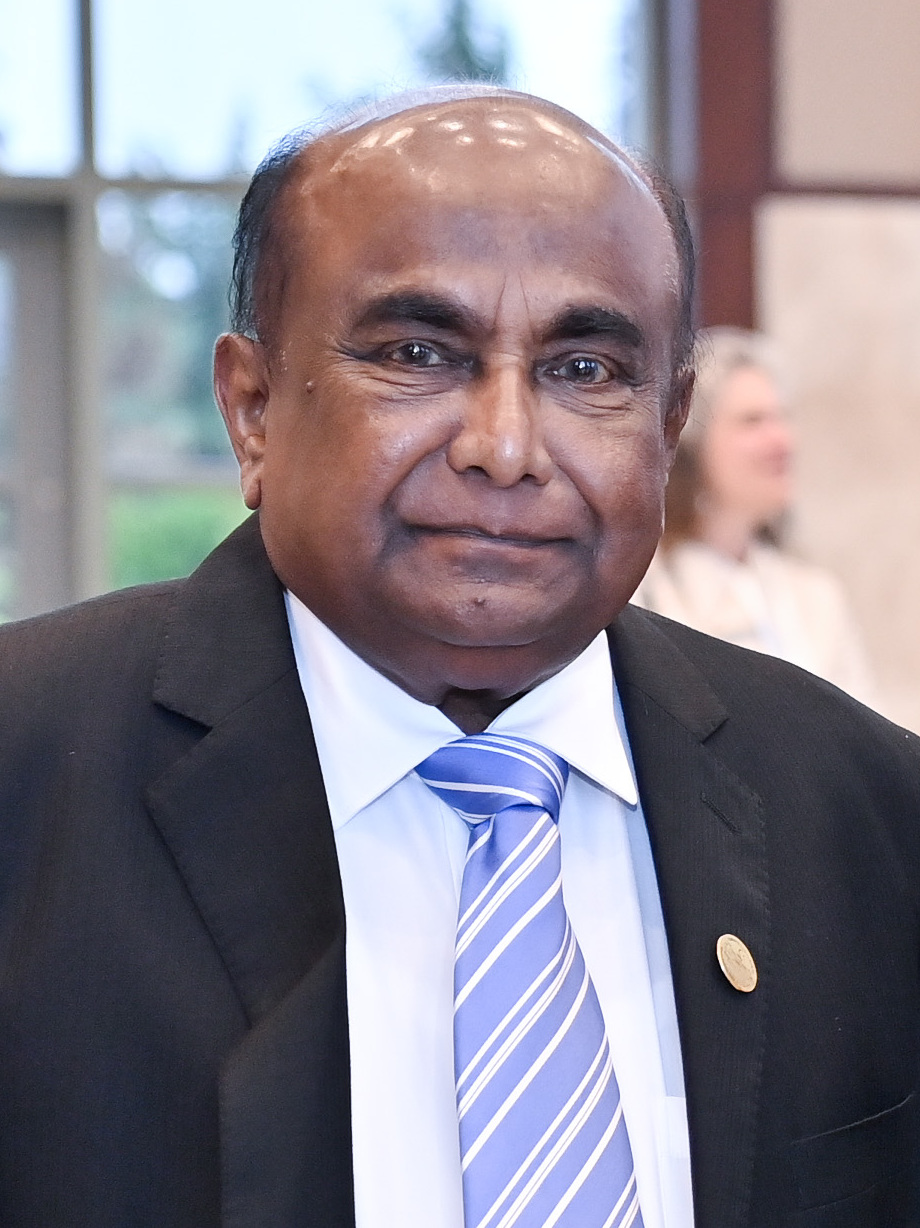
- Abeywardena in 2023

21st Speaker of the Parliament
- In office 20 August 2020 – 24 September 2024
- Deputy: Ranjith Siyambalapitiya; Ajith Rajapakse
- Preceded by: Karu Jayasuriya
- Succeeded by: Asoka Ranwala

Minister of Parliamentary Affairs
- In office February 2015 – May 2015
- Preceded by: Sumedha Jayasena
- Succeeded by: Lakshman Yapa Abeywardena

Minister of Agriculture
- In office 2010 – 12 January 2015
- Preceded by: Maithripala Sirisena
- Succeeded by: Duminda Dissanayake

Minister of Cultural Affairs
- In office 2005–2010
- Preceded by: Vijitha Herath

Deputy Minister of Healthcare & Nutrition
- In office 2004–2005
- Preceded by: Sajith Premadasa

3rd Chief Minister of Southern Province
- In office 1994–2001
- Preceded by: Amarasiri Dodangoda
- Succeeded by: H. G. Sirisena

Member of Parliament for Matara District
- In office 2001 – 24 September 2024

Personal details
- Born: 10 October 1945 (age 80) Beragama, Matara, Colony of Ceylon (now Sri Lanka)
- Party: Sri Lanka Podujana Peramuna
- Other political affiliations: Sri Lanka People's Freedom Alliance, United National Party
- Children: 5
- Education: University of Colombo, Rahula College, Matara, Thelijjawila Central College
- Occupation: Land Proprietor
- Profession: Politician

Mahinda Yapa Abeywardena (born 10 October 1945) is a Sri Lankan politician and land proprietor. He was the Speaker of the Parliament of Sri Lanka from 2020 to 2024.

== Political career ==
He first entered parliament in 1983 as part of the Hakmana United National Party and has been active in politics for more than 30 years.

Mahinda Yapa Abeywardena was a young MP when he openly criticised the 1987 Indo-Sri Lanka Accord for establishing a new provincial councils system in Sri Lanka. He along with Chandrakumara Wijeya Gunawardena, the member for Kamburupitiya voted against the bill in Parliament becoming the only two government members who voted against it. He was later removed by the then President J. R. Jayewardene from his Parliamentary seat for violation of the party rules by not voting for the bill.

He later joined hands with Gamini Dissanayake and Lalith Athulathmudali (who were also against the Indo-Sri Lanka Accord) as they too quit United National Party and formed the Democratic United National Front or aka 'Rajaliya-front'. Mahinda Yapa Abeywardena then contested for Southern Provincial Council under DUNF and won. He was then elected as the opposition leader of the Southern Provincial Council in 1993, and he became the Chief Minister of the Southern Provincial Council in 1994. Elected twice as the Chief Minister he was in office from 1994 to 2001. He is said to be one of the most successful Chief Ministers from the south for developing the infrastructure that was neglected for more than 5 years due to the dark era of the country.

He left office to contest in the 2001 general elections and become an opposition MP and served until 2004. After the 2004 General elections, he became the Deputy Minister of Healthcare and later the Cabinet Minister for Cultural Affairs & National Heritage. After the 2010 General Elections, he was appointed as the Minister of Agriculture. Having been in office as the Minister of Agriculture for several years he was elected Vice Chairman at the 38th session of the Food and Agricultural Organization of the United Nations FAO Conference held in Rome, Italy in 2013. He was again appointed as the Minister of Parliamentary Affairs in 2015 for a brief period until he resigned and joined the opposition.

He is a representative of Matara District in the Parliament of Sri Lanka. He resides in Kalubowila, Dehiwala.

=== No-confidence motion ===
Abeywardena who was a Rajapakse ally was mostly criticized by the opposition and media for acting biased from the speaker's seat. On 5 March 2024, the main opposition party Samagi Jana Balawegaya handed over a no-confidence motion against him claiming his actions to failure to protect the constitution by signing the Online Safety Bill and ignoring the Supreme Court’s recommendations pertaining to Sections 13, 17, 20, 33 (6), 34 (1), 35 (1), 21, 22 and 33. This was the first no-confidence motion against a Speaker of Parliament in the history of Sri Lanka. He was also criticized for being blatantly violated at the constitutional council to appoint inspector general of police, when we did not have the voting authority, but cast his vote.

== See also ==
- Cabinet of Sri Lanka

Political offices
Preceded by Karu Jayasuriya	Speaker of the Parliament of Sri Lanka; 2020–2024	Succeeded by Asoka Ranwala
