= Amarasiri Dodangoda =

Sri Lankan politician (1941–2009)

Hon. Amarasiri Dodangoda

Minister of Justice
- In office 8 April 2004 – 30 May 2009
- President: Mahinda Rajapaksa; Chandrika Kumaratunga
- Prime Minister: Ratnasiri Wickremanayake; Mahinda Rajapaksa
- Preceded by: W. J. M. Lokubandara
- Succeeded by: Milinda Moragoda

Member of Parliament for Galle District
- In office 1989–1993
- In office 1994–2009

Personal details
- Born: 18 October 1941
- Died: 30 May 2009 (aged 67) Galle, Sri Lanka
- Party: Sri Lanka Freedom Party
- Children: 2
- Occupation: Politician
- Profession: Lawyer

Amarasiri Dodangoda (18 October 1941 – 30 May 2009) was a Sri Lankan politician, the former Minister of Justice and Law Reforms (2005–2009) and the second Chief Minister of the Southern Province (1993–1994).

== Early life ==
Dodangoda was born on 18 October 1941 to a businessman William Appuhamy and Punyawathie Goonesekera in Dodangoda, Galle. His had his primary education at Kukulalawatte Junior School, Ginimallegaha, Baddegama and had his tertiary level education both at Baddegama Ratnasara Vidyalaya and Richmond College, Galle. He graduated from the University of Ceylon, Peradeniya in 1963 with a B.A. degree and began his profession as a teacher at Vidyaloka Pirivena, Galle. Then he joined the Government service as an Education Officer in the latter part of the 1960s and this was followed by his entry to Sri Lanka Law College in 1971. Subsequently he was sworn in as an Attorney-at-Law of the Supreme Court of Sri Lanka. He was married and had two children.

== Politics ==
He was a radical political figure in Southern Sri Lanka since 1971. He acted as Sri Lanka Freedom Party organiser for Baddegama, contested the Baddegama electorate and entered Parliament in 1983. In 1989 he contested the Galle multi member electorate and was elected to parliament. In 1993 he gave up his Parliamentary seat and when he was the elected Chief Minister of the Southern Province. He re-entered Parliament as an MP in 1994 when the Sri Lanka Freedom Party returned to government after 17 years and held various ministerial portfolios, including those of indigenous medicine, co-operatives, vocational training, local government, public administration and home affairs. He was appointed Minister of Justice and Law Reforms in 2005. He was a firm supporter of then President, Mahinda Rajapakse.

Not only in Galle City but around Sri Lanka many lands were purchased by foreigners and they continue to do so. When the new Government is formed we will not allow them to purchase lands" said Amarasiri Dodangoda former Minister and the leader of the Galle District Freedom Alliance. Amarasiri Dodangoda said he was in Parliament about 23 years and this is the first time candidates are meeting to explain their policies. He said that during the last two years UNF Ministers and MPs said many things but have not done work to people. Many became rich people.

* Sri Lanka can be taken towards progress only by a Leftist Government, Amarasiri Dodangoda said. "UNP denial, of a secret pact with the LTTE is an utter falsehood, and deceptive as they have already inserted of an interim administration to North-East for a short period, in their election manifesto".

- "The UNP and its leader Ranil Wicremesinghe were the most suitable tools for those business tycoons and LTTE to activate their coup against the government.
- "Sensible and patriotic people are with the PA, and not with UNP. Short time interim administration given to Prabhakaran in the North-East means giving Eelam on a platter for ever. You all should be aware of it" Amarasiri Dodangoda said.

== Death ==
In March 2009, Dodangoda was admitted to the Colombo National Hospital due to an undisclosed ailment. On 30 May 2009, he died as a result of prolonged illness.
