= A. M. Buddhadasa =

Sri Lankan politician

Aththintha Marakalage Buddhadasa, known as A.M. Buddhadasa, was the Chief Minister of Uva Province in Sri Lanka from 1995 to 1999. He later served as Health Minister in the Provincial Council.
