= H. G. Sirisena =

Sri Lankan politician

4th Chief Minister of Southern Province
- In office 21 December 2001 – 18 July 2004
- Preceded by: Mahinda Yapa Abeywardena
- Succeeded by: Shan Wijayalal De Silva

Personal details
- Party: Sri Lanka Freedom Party
- Other political affiliations: People's Alliance

H. G. Sirisena was the 4th Chief Minister of Southern Province, Sri Lanka. He was appointed on 21 December 2001 succeeding Mahinda Yapa Abeywardena and was Chief Minister until 18 July 2004. He was succeeded by Shan Wijayalal De Silva.

Political offices
Preceded by Mahinda Yapa Abeywardena	Chief Minister of Southern Province; 2001-2004	Succeeded by Shan Wijayalal De Silva
