= Samaraweera Weerawanni =

Sri Lankan politician

Samaraweera Weerawanni is a Sri Lankan politician. He was the Chief Minister of Uva Province in Sri Lanka from Apr 1999 to Oct 2001 his wife Nalini Weerawanni was the Chief Minister till he resigned from the Sri Lankan Parliament and became the Chief Minister.
