= G. M. S. Samaraweera =

5th Governor of North Central Province
- In office 18 August 1998 – 18 August 2003
- Preceded by: Maithripala Senanayake
- Succeeded by: Jagath Balasuriya

Personal details
- Born: 1937 Anuradhapura, North Central Province, Sri Lanka
- Died: 18 May 2006 (aged 68–69) Colombo, Western Province, Sri Lanka
- Resting place: Anuradhapura

G. M. S. Samaraweera (1937 - 18 May 2006) was a Sri Lankan politician and High Court Judge. the 5th Governor of North Central Province. He was appointed on 18 August 1998 succeeding Maithripala Senanayake and was Governor until 18 August 2003. He was succeeded by Jagath Balasuriya.

Samaraweera was educated at the Holy Family Convent, Anuradhapura and S. Thomas' College, Bandarawela and S. Thomas' College, Gurutalawa, after which he entered the Colombo Law College graduating as an advocate, and later joining the Army.

Political offices
Preceded by Maithripala Senanayake	Governor of North Central Province; 1998–2003	Succeeded by Jagath Balasuriya
