= Maithripala Senanayake =

Sri Lankan politician (1916–1998)

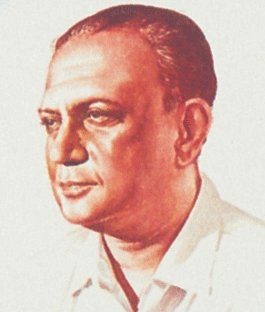

4th Governor of North Central Province
- In office 7 September 1994 – 12 July 1998
- President: Chandrika Kumaratunga
- Prime Minister: Sirimavo Bandaranaike
- Preceded by: E. L. B. Hurulle
- Succeeded by: G. M. S. Samaraweera

Leader of the House
- In office 7 June 1970 – 18 May 1977
- Prime Minister: Sirimavo Bandaranaike
- Preceded by: C. P. de Silva
- Succeeded by: Ranasinghe Premadasa

Minister of Irrigation, Power and Highways
- In office 31 May 1970 – 1977
- Prime Minister: Sirimavo Bandaranaike
- Preceded by: C. P. de Silva
- Succeeded by: Gamini Dissanayake

Minister of Industries, Home and Cultural Affairs
- In office 1960–1965
- Prime Minister: Sirimavo Bandaranaike
- Preceded by: W. J. C. Munasinha
- Succeeded by: Philip Gunawardena

Minister of Transport and Works (Note: Minister of Transport and Power from September 1959 to December 1959.)
- In office 12 April 1956 – 8 December 1959
- Prime Minister: S. W. R. D. Bandaranaike; Wijeyananda Dahanayake
- Preceded by: Montague Jayawickrama
- Succeeded by: Robert Edward Jayatilaka

Member of Parliament for National List
- In office 1989–1994

Member of Parliament for Medawachchiya
- In office 1947–1989
- Preceded by: Constituency created
- Succeeded by: Constituency abolished

Personal details
- Born: 7 July 1916 Medawachchiya, Anuradhapura, British Ceylon.
- Died: 12 July 1998 (aged 82) Sri Lanka
- Party: Sri Lanka Freedom Party
- Other political affiliations: United National Party
- Spouse: Ranji Handy
- Education: St Joseph's College, Anuradhapura; St. John's College, Jaffna; Nalanda College Colombo
- Occupation: Politician

Maithripala Senanayake (7 July 1916 – 12 July 1998) was a Sri Lankan politician and Governor of the North-Central province. He first studied at St. Joseph's College, Anuradhapura then at St. John's College, Jaffna, where he learnt Tamil and later at Nalanda College Colombo.

He entered parliament from Medawachchiya Electorate in 1947 when then Ceylon held its first parliamentary elections.

When D. S. Senanayake picked his Cabinet in 1952, Senanayake was appointed Parliamentary Secretary to the Ministry of Home Affairs.

Later he not only resigned from the post he held, but also from the UNP, after submitting resignation to Prime Minister Dudley Senanayake. At the following General Election, he retained the Medawachchiya seat as an independent.

Following this period, S. W. R. D. Bandaranaike resigned from the UNP and formed the Sri Lanka Freedom Party, inviting Senanayake, who was an Independent politician, to join the newly created party.

Senanayake has held many cabinet portfolios and has been acting Prime Minister nineteen times, Leader of the House, Chief Government Whip, and Deputy Leader of the Opposition at various times. In the realm of Foreign Affairs, Maithripala Senanayake has also played a major role, when the then Prime Minister Sirimavo Bandaranaike was President of the non-aligned movement, he led the Sri Lanka delegation at the 5th Summit of the Non-Aligned Movement held in Colombo.

He represented Parliament since 1947 to 1994 becoming the only person in Sri Lanka to represent Parliament for 47 years continuously. In the 1989 election which was the first Parliamentary election to be held under the proportional representation he entered Parliament as a National list member. He was not appointed to Parliament in 1994. However he was appointed the governor of the North Central Province in the same year which he held until his death.

Political offices
Preceded by E. L. B. Hurulle	Governor of North Central Province; 1994–1998	Succeeded by G. M. S. Samaraweera
