= Kingsley Wickramaratne =

Sri Lankan politician

Hon. Kingsley Wickramaratne

5th Governor of Southern Province
- In office 1 February 2002 – 23 October 2006
- Preceded by: Ananda Dassanayake
- Succeeded by: Kumari Balasuriya

Kingsley Tissa Wickramaratne (died 2008) was the governor of Southern Province. Wickramaratne held the position from 1 February 2002, through 23 October 2006, when he was replaced by Kumari Balasuriya.

Political offices
Preceded by Ananda Dassanayake	Governor of Southern Province; 2002-2006	Succeeded by Kumari Balasuriya
