= Siripala Jayaweera =

Siripala Jayaweera was the sixth Governor of the North Western Province of Sri Lanka from January 1999 to April 2004.

Political offices
Preceded by Hector Arawwawala	Governor of the North Western Province; 1999–2004	Succeeded by Dharmadasa Wanniarachchi
