= List of missions to Sri Lanka =

Series of diplomatic missions to Sri Lanka

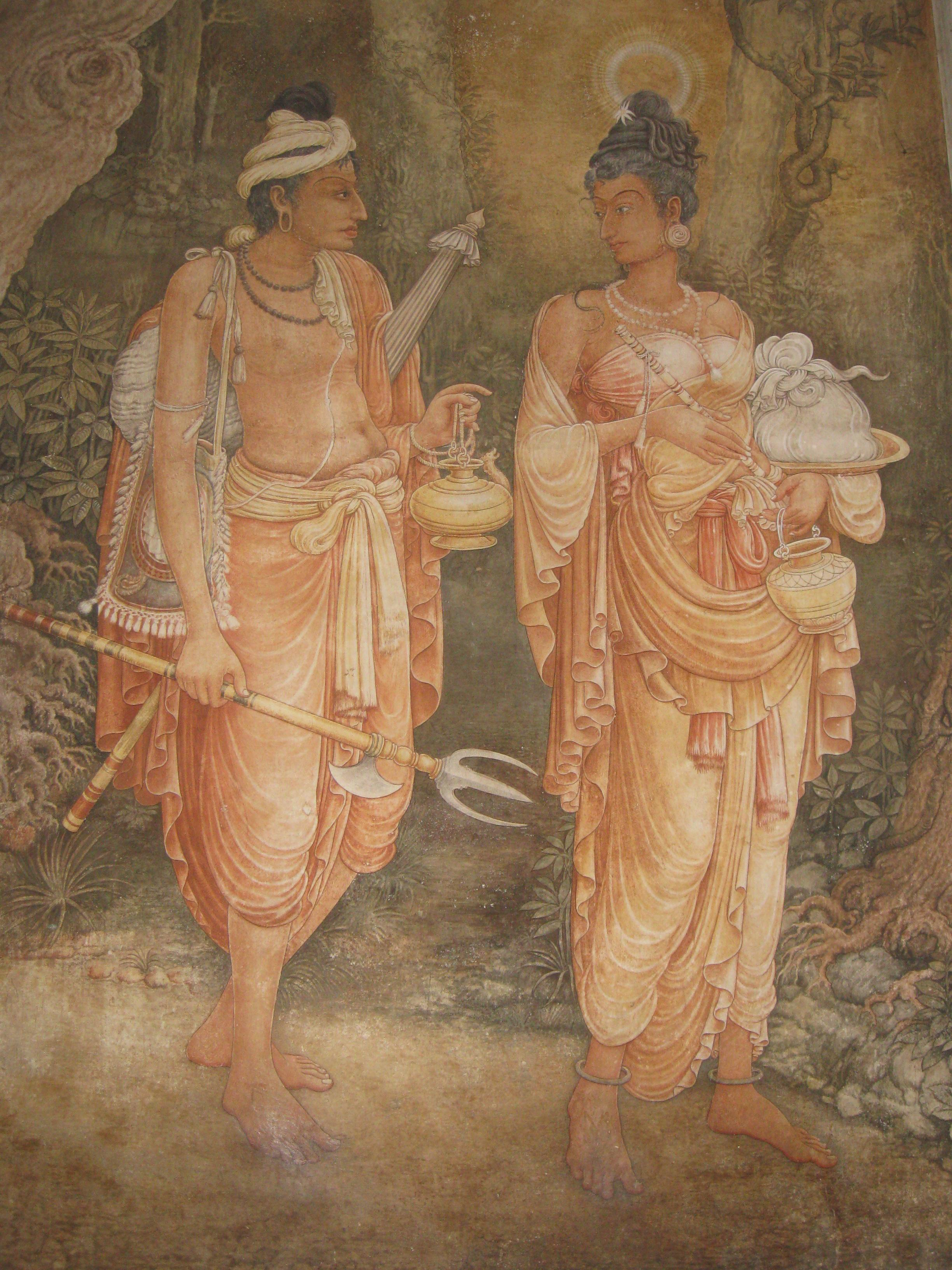
Princess Hemamala and Prince Dantha of the Kalinga Kingdom. According to tradition, The Buddha's tooth Relic was hidden inside the Princesses hair coiffure to safely smuggle it past rival armies during a period of war, ensuring its sanctuary on the island where it became a central symbol of sovereignty and religious devotion.

Sri Lanka's history of foreign contacts encompasses a documented series of diplomatic missions, commercial embassies, religious pilgrimages, and transoceanic voyages received by the island's monarchy from antiquity through the fall of the Kingdom of Kandy. Positioned at the central intersection of major Maritime Silk Road trade routes across the Indian Ocean, the island functioned as a vital trade hub connecting South Asia with the Mediterranean and the Middle East and East and South East Asia. Concurrently, Sri Lanka served as the primary custodian and international sanctuary of Theravada Buddhist scholarship, drawing monks, scholars, and envoys from across Asia to its monastic centers.

The island's early foreign relations during the Anuradhapura period (377 BCE–1017 CE) established enduring religious and diplomatic precedents. Most notably, the 3rd-century BCE Mauryan missions dispatched by Emperor Ashoka, led by Mahinda Thera and Sanghamitta Theri, officially introduced Buddhism to the island and established the sangha. Sri Lanka's strategic position also led to early diplomatic exchanges beyond the subcontinent, including formal embassies sent to the Roman Empire during the reign of Claudius, the arrival of the sacred Tooth Relic from Kalinga, and extended visits by Chinese pilgrims such as Faxian. During this era, the island maintained extensive maritime networks involving Tang China, the Byzantine Empire, and early Islamic trade networks under the Abbasid Caliphate.

Throughout the Polonnaruwa period (1017–1232) and subsequent eras, foreign engagements were heavily defined by dynamic religious interchange and shifting regional politics. Sri Lanka cultivated deep reciprocal ties with Southeast Asia, exchanging monastic delegations, scriptures, and royal embassies with the Pagan Kingdom and Hanthawaddy Kingdom of Myanmar, as well as the Lanna Kingdom and Ayutthaya Kingdom of Thailand, often to restore damaged ordination lineages (Upasampadā). The island's location and importance also attracted prominent medieval travelers, including Marco Polo, Ibn Battuta, and Giovanni de' Marignolli, as well as the armadas of the Ming treasure voyages under Admiral Zheng He, which resulted in the Ming–Kotte War of 1411 and significant geopolitical shifts in the Kingdom of Kotte.

From the early 16th century, foreign contacts transformed dramatically with the advent of European maritime expansion. Native rulers in Kotte, Sitawaka, and Kandy engaged in complex power struggles, treaties, and military alliances with rival foreign powers to secure military hegemony and territorial defense. Initial contacts with the Portuguese were followed by formal diplomatic alliances with the Dutch East India Company (VOC), as well as missions from Danish, French, and British envoys. These diplomatic overtures and military interventions culminated in the 1815 Kandyan Convention, through which the Kandyan nobility ceded the island's sovereignty to the British Empire, ending over two millennia of independent Sri Lankan monarchy and foreign diplomacy.

== List of missions ==
Year	Sender	Envoys	Sri Lankan monarch	Comments
Anuradhapura period (377 BCE–1017 CE)
247 BCE	Ashoka (Maurya Empire)	Mahinda Thera	Devanampiya Tissa	Mauryan Buddhist mission sent by Emperor Ashoka, officially introducing Theravada Buddhism to Sri Lanka.
236 BCE	Ashoka (Maurya Empire)	Sanghamitta Theri	Devanampiya Tissa	Arrival of Sanghamitta Theri carrying a sapling of the Jaya Sri Maha Bodhi tree to establish the Bhikkhuni Sangha.
137 BCE	Menander I (Alexandria in the Caucasus or Alexandria Arachosia)	Mahadharmaraksita	Dutugamunu	Visited Sri Lanka during the reign of Dutugamunu for the dedication ceremony of the Ruwanwelisaya (Maha Thupa) in Anuradhapura, which took place around 137 BCE shortly after the king's death.
41–54	Claudius (Roman empire)	Annius Plocamus	Bhatika Abhaya	Diplomatic embassy dispatched from Sri Lanka to Rome during the reign of Emperor Claudius.
311	Guhasiva (Kalinga Kingdom)	Princess Hemamala and Prince Dantha	Sirimeghavanna	Mission bringing the Sacred Tooth Relic of the Buddha to Sri Lanka for safekeeping during a time of war in India.
410–412	Pilgrim (Later Qin)	Faxian	Mahanama	Chinese Buddhist monk who visited Sri Lanka to acquire sacred texts and study at the Abhayagiri Vihāra.
425–450	Pilgrim (Gupta Empire)	Buddhaghosa	Mahanama	Indian Theravada scholar-monk who translated Sinhala commentaries into Pali and wrote the Visuddhimagga at the Mahavihara.
~420s/430s	Pilgrim (Kashmir)	Gunavarman	Mahanama	A prince in Kashmir, who renounced his royal inheritance, became a monk and travelled to Sri Lanka.
~522–550	Traveller (Byzantine Empire)	Cosmas Indicopleustes	Silakala	Greek merchant and traveler who documented Sri Lanka's role as an Indian Ocean trade hub.
720	Pilgrim (India)	Vajrabodhi	Aggabodhi VI	Indian Vajrayana master who visited Sri Lanka on his way to Tang China.
741–746	Emperor Xuanzong (Tang dynasty)	Amoghavajra	Aggabodhi VI	Disciple of Vajrabodhi who returned to Sri Lanka to gather Esoteric Buddhist manuscripts and rituals.
850–851	Traveller (Abbasid Caliphate)	Sulaiman al-Tajir	Sena I	Persian Muslim merchant and envoy who recorded early trade ties and gem markets.
900	Traveller (Abbasid Caliphate)	Abu Zayd al-Sirafi	Sena II	Arab scholar and traveler who compiled detailed accounts of Indian Ocean maritime networks.
970	Traveller (Abbasid Caliphate)	Al-Masudi	Sena V	Arab historian and geographer who visited Sri Lanka during his travels across South Asia.
Polonnaruwa period (1017–1232)
1025–1026	Pilgrim (Bengal)	Atiśa	Mahinda V (de jure)/ Rajendra I (de facto)	Atiśa visited Sri Lanka on his journey back to the Indian subcontinent from Southeast Asia.
1071	Anawrahta (Pagan Kingdom)	High-ranking Theravada monks	Vijayabahu I	Twenty senior Bhikkhus arrived from Ramaññadesa, along with scriptures and a white elephant sent by Anawrahta, at the request of Vijayabahu I, to restore the damaged Buddhist ordination lineage (Upasampada) following the destruction caused by the Chola occupation. In return, the Polonnaruwa king gave a replica of the Buddha Tooth. The replica was then enshrined in the Lawkananda Pagoda in Pagan.
1150s	Alaungsithu (Pagan Kingdom)	Alaungsithu	Parakramabahu I	Although Myanmar sources claim the Pagan monarch traveled to Polonnaruwa to marry a Sinhalese princess and establish an embassy, Sri Lankan records make no mention of this royal marriage. Both traditions agree, however, that a Sri Lankan ambassador was appointed to Myanmar; his subsequent reports on an incident ultimately severed diplomatic relations between the two rulers.
1160s	Alaungsithu (Pagan Kingdom)	Mon Bhikkhus of Rāmañña	Parakramabahu I	Following the conflict between the two kingdoms, Mon Bhikkhus from Rāmañña sent messengers carrying letters to Sinhala Bhikkhus to mediate and successfully negotiate a peace settlement.
1167	Narathu (Pagan Kingdom)	Sangharāja Panthagu	Parakramabahu I	The Myanmar Sangharāja Panthagu left Myanmar in protest of King Narathu's actions and sought refuge in Sri Lanka for six years.
1170	Narapatisithu (Pagan Kingdom)	Sangharāja Uttarajiva & Chapata	Parakramabahu I	A delegation led by Myanmar Sangharāja Uttarajīva visited Sri Lanka on pilgrimage and presented the Pali grammar text Saddanīti to Sri Lankan monks.
Transitional period (1232–1592)
c. 1237–1248	Kyaswa (Pagan Kingdom)	Dhammasiri & Subhuticanda	Parakramabahu II	A delegation of Myanmar monks led by the royal teacher Dhammasiri and Subhuticanda undertook a religious mission to Sri Lanka.
1271	Narathihapate (Pagan Kingdom)	Bagan monks (recorded by Tissa Maha Thera)	Vijayabahu IV	Mission sent by the King of Bagan carrying a message to the Sri Lankan monarch requesting Sri Lankan monk teachers to go to Myanmar to propagate the Buddha's message.
1292–1293	Traveller (Republic of Venice)	Marco Polo	Parakramabahu III	Venetian merchant and traveler who visited Sri Lanka while returning from Yuan-dynasty China, writing detailed descriptions of its gems and culture.
1322–1324	Traveller (Papal States)	Odoric of Pordenone	Bhuvanekabahu II	Franciscan friar who visited the island during his travels throughout Asia and noted local customs and religious pilgrimages.
1324–1328	Traveller (Papal States)	Jordan Catala	Bhuvanekabahu II	French Dominican missionary and traveler who visited South Asia and recorded account of the island in his Mirabilia Descripta.
1344	Traveller (Marinid Sultanate)	Ibn Battuta	Bhuvanekabahu IV	Moroccan scholar and traveler who landed in Sri Lanka, visited Adam's Peak, and recorded notes on the Kingdom of Jaffna and local rulers.
1348–1349	Traveller (Papal States)	Giovanni de' Marignolli	Parakramabahu V	Papal legate who spent four months in Sri Lanka while returning from a diplomatic mission to China.
1405–1407	Yongle Emperor (Ming dynasty)	Zheng He	Vira Alakesvara	The fleet anchored off the western coast of Sri Lanka. However, encountering hostility from the local ruler, Vira Alakesvara, Zheng He decided not to engage and departed for India.
1409–1411	Yongle Emperor (Ming dynasty)	Zheng He	Parakramabahu Āpāna	Upon arriving, Zheng He presented the famous Galle Trilingual Inscription. Vira Alakesvara was aggressive, demanded tribute, and tried to ambush the fleet. In response, Zheng He launched a counter-offensive culminating in the Ming–Kotte War (1411), captured Alakesvara along with his family, and took them back as prisoners to the Ming court in Nanjing. The Ming emperor eventually pardoned the king, released him, and backed a rival line to succeed the throne.
1413–1415	Yongle Emperor (Ming dynasty)	Zheng He	Parakramabahu VI	With a friendly ruler now installed on the Kotte throne, Sri Lanka served as a safe, peaceful port for resupply and trade as the fleet made its long crossing across the Arabian Sea.
1417–1419	Yongle Emperor (Ming dynasty)	Zheng He	Parakramabahu VI	Sri Lanka served as a primary maritime milestone and replenishment base for the fleet and its detached squadrons on their outward and return journeys across the Indian Ocean.
~1412–1471	Pilgrim (Lanna Kingdom)	Ñāṇakitti Thera	Parakramabahu VI	Lanna monk who traveled to Sri Lanka to study Pali scriptures and receive higher ordination.
1419–1444	Traveller (Republic of Venice)	Niccolò de' Conti	Parakramabahu VI	Venetian merchant and traveler who visited Sri Lanka and recorded observations on cinnamon cultivation and local trade.
1431–1433	Xuande Emperor (Ming dynasty)	Zheng He	Parakramabahu VI	The fleet made routine stops at Sri Lanka to conduct trade, exchange gifts, and take on supplies.
1476	Dhammazedi (Hanthawaddy kingdom)	Burmese monks and envoys	Bhuvanekabahu VI	Religious embassy sent by Dhammazedi of Pegu to obtain Higher Ordination on the Kalyāni River, establishing the Kalyani Nikaya and Kalyāni Sīmā in Myanmar.
1505	Traveller (Papal States)	Ludovico di Varthema	Parakramabahu IX	An Italian adventurer and traveler from Bologna who documented the island's political landscape and four warring kings.
1505	Manuel I (Kingdom of Portugal)	Lourenço de Almeida	Parakramabahu IX	First Portuguese expedition landing at Galle and establishing initial diplomatic and commercial contact with the Kingdom of Kotte.
1576	Bayinnaung (Toungoo dynasty)	Burmese envoys	Dharmapala of Kotte	Bayinnaung sent envoys to Dharmapala requesting the Tooth Relic and a princess in marriage.
Kandyan period (1592–1815)
1596	Min Razagyi (Kingdom of Mrauk U)	Thera Nandicakka	Vimaladharmasuriya I	Sent at the request of Vimaladharmasuriya I, an Arakanese Buddhist mission arrived headed by Thera Nandicakka, who led a group of Bhikkhus to conduct Upasampadā ceremony in the Udakukkhepa Sîma on the Mahaveli river at the landing place called Ganthambatittha (Getambe, Kandy).
1602	States General (Dutch Republic)	Joris van Spilbergen & Sebald de Weert	Vimaladharmasuriya I	First Dutch diplomatic contacts with the Kingdom of Kandy, establishing an alliance against Portuguese control.
1608	Henry IV (Kingdom of France)	François Pyrard de Laval	Senarat	The French navigator is shipwrecked and after being brought to Goa as a prisoner in 1608, he was pressed into service as a soldier on Portuguese naval fleets. During his mandatory military service between 1608 and 1609, he was dispatched on expeditions across the region, including to Sri Lanka, Malacca, and the Strait of Hormuz.
1612–1619	States General (Dutch Republic)	Marcelis de Boschhouwer	Senarat	Dutch VOC representative who negotiated a treaty with Senarat for commercial and military cooperation.
1618	Christian IV (Denmark–Norway)	Ove Gjedde	Senarat	Danish expedition under Admiral Ove Gjedde that resulted in a trade agreement and the construction of Fort Dansborg at Tranquebar.
1640–1658	John IV (Kingdom of Portugal)	João Ribeiro	Rajasinha II	Portuguese soldier and writer who documented military events and geography of Sri Lanka during early European expansion.
1672	Louis XIV (Kingdom of France)	Sieur de La Nérolle	Rajasinha II	French diplomatic mission sent on behalf of Louis XIV; ended in failure due to court protocol disputes.
1687–1711	Pedro II (Portuguese India)	Joseph Vaz	Vimaladharmasuriya II	Oratorian missionary mission that re-established Catholic institutions during the period of Dutch persecution.
1697	Mayuppiya or Kalamandat (Kingdom of Mrauk U)	Thera Santana & 33 monks	Vimaladharmasuriya II	Sent at the request of Vimaladharmasuriya II, 33 monks headed by Thera Santana arrived from Arakan in Sri Lanka and conferred Upasampadā on 33 sāmaneras performed at the same Ganthambatittha.
1705–1742	John V (Portuguese India)	Jacome Gonsalves	Vira Narendra Sinha	Catholic missionary and linguist who composed Christian literature in Sinhala and Tamil under Kandyan protection.
1710	VOC Governor-General (Dutch East India Company)	J. W. Hiltebrand	Vira Narendra Sinha	VOC diplomatic mission sent to congratulate the new Kandyan king on his accession and resolve ongoing trade disputes.
1731–1732	VOC Governor-General (Dutch East India Company)	VOC Ambassadors	Vira Narendra Sinha	Mission sent to negotiate cinnamon collection rights and address VOC coastal territorial concessions.
1736	VOC Governor-General (Dutch East India Company)	Daniel Agreen	Vira Narendra Sinha	Envoy dispatched during growing unrest and strikes in the cinnamon-producing areas surrounding Kandy.
1745–1746	VOC Governor-General (Dutch East India Company)	Jacobus Heeser	Sri Vijaya Rajasinha	VOC embassy sent to stabilize trade relations following the accession of the Nayak dynasty ruler.
1753–1755	Borommakot (Ayutthaya Kingdom)	Upali Thera	Kirti Sri Rajasinha	Siamese Buddhist mission dispatched by Borommakot that re-established the Upasampada ordination line in Sri Lanka.
1756	Borommakot (Ayutthaya Kingdom)	Siamese monks and envoys	Kirti Sri Rajasinha	Follow-up Siamese mission consolidating religious ties and establishing the Siam Nikaya monastic order.
1759–1760	Borommakot (Ayutthaya Kingdom)	Kromma Muen Thepphiphit	Kirti Sri Rajasinha	Exile and political mission involving a Siamese royal prince seeking refuge and support in Kandy.
1762	George III (Great Britain)	John Pybus	Kirti Sri Rajasinha	First official British East India Company embassy sent to explore a military alliance against the Dutch.
1782	George III (Great Britain)	Hugh Boyd	Kirti Sri Rajasinha	British mission dispatched following the capture of Trincomalee during the Fourth Anglo-Dutch War.
1795–1796	George III (Great Britain)	Robert Andrews	Sri Rajadhi Rajasinha	Negotiated a preliminary treaty between the EIC and Kandy as British forces displaced the Dutch from coastal Sri Lanka.
1800	George III (Great Britain)	Hay MacDowall	Sri Vikrama Rajasinha	British diplomatic mission proposing a military protectorate over Kandy, which was rejected by the Kandyan court.
March 1803	Bodawpaya (Konbaung dynasty)	Aggasāra Thera & 5 Myanmar monks	Sri Vikrama Rajasinha	Five senior Myanmar monks led by Aggasāra Thera accompanied Welitara Ñānawimalatissa and Five senior Sinhala monks, back to Sri Lanka, bringing Tripitaka texts and holding Upasampadā ceremonies at Balapiti Modara.

== See also ==
- Foreign relations of Sri Lanka
- Tourism in Sri Lanka
- List of Sri Lankan missions abroad
- List of state visits received by Anura Kumara Dissanayake
