= List of Sri Lankan missions abroad =

Series of diplomatic missions from Sri Lanka

The transmission of Theravada Buddhism originated in ancient India before taking root in Sri Lanka and subsequently expanded across Southeast Asia and globally.

This is a list of historical diplomatic missions, travellers, and pilgrims dispatched from Sri Lanka, spanning from the antiquity of the Anuradhapura period to early modern Sri Lanka. Positioned along major trans-Indian Ocean trade routes Sri Lanka served not only as the paramount center for Theravada Buddhism but a hub in a global network of trade and diplomacy. The Indian Ocean island leveraged its position equidistant between East Asia, the Middle East, and East Africa to function as a commercial emporium and maritime entrepôt astride major trans-oceanic trade routes. The Sinhalese monarchs pursued an active, sophisticated, and selective foreign policy designed to safeguard sovereign independence, expand international commerce, and foster enduring cultural links across the known world, regularly dispatching royal emissaries, monastic delegations, trade envoys, and tribute-bearing embassies to countries as far as East Asia and Western Europe. The Periplus of the Erythraean Sea, a 1st century Periplus mentions Taprobane as a trading emporium for elephants, gems, and spices.

State-sponsored diplomacy was initiated in the 3rd century BCE, when Dēvānaṃpiya Tissa dispatched a diplomatic mission to Pataliputra led by his chief minister and nephew, Mahā-Ariṭṭha seeking to establish formal relations with Emperor Ashoka of the Mauryan Empire. The Sinhalese monarch requested royal consecration regalia, and appealed to the emperor to embrace the Buddhist faith. Following this diplomatic exchange, the Emperor dispatched his children, Mahinda Thero and Sanghamitta Theri to the Sinhalese court leading to the establishment of Buddhism as the island's premier religion, which subsequently served as a enduring inspiration for foreign relations and was later transmitted by Sri Lankan monastic missions to Southeast Asian kingdoms such as Myanmar, Thailand, and Cambodia.

Key foreign destinations included empires of the Indian subcontinent, imperial China across successive dynasties, the Roman Empire, Islamic caliphates of the Middle East, and the Southeast Asian polities. Overseas missions were undertaken to cultivate trade agreements, secure political and military alliances against foreign aggression, exchange cultural and scientific knowledge, and preserve or restore Buddhist monastic lineages (Upasampadā). This list details recorded outward embassies as documented in indigenous Sri Lankan chronicles, foreign imperial annals, epigraphical records, and European archival sources.

== List of missions ==
Year	Sri Lankan monarch	Envoys	Foreign recipient	Comments
Anuradhapura period (377 BCE–1017 CE)
c. 3rd century BCE	Devanampiya Tissa	Royal delegation led by Mahā-Ariṭṭha	Ashoka (Maurya Empire)	Soon after ascending the throne, Dēvānaṃpiya Tissa dispatched a diplomatic mission to Pataliputra led by his chief minister and nephew, Mahā-Ariṭṭha. The embassy sought to establish formal relations, requested royal consecration regalia, and appealed to the emperor to embrace the Buddhist faith. In exchange for the valuable gifts sent by Dēvānaṃpiya Tissa, Ashoka provided the complete ceremonial implements for a royal coronation and paved the way for the introduction of Buddhism to Sri Lanka. Dēvānaṃpiya Tissa was subsequently consecrated a second time in an elaborate ceremony prescribed by Ashoka, from whom he may have received the honorific title Devanampiya ("Beloved of the Gods"). Following this diplomatic exchange, Arahat Mahinda arrived on the island.
c. 22 BCE–7 CE	Bhatika Abhaya	Sinhala diplomatic envoys (Rachias)	Augustus (Roman Empire)	Embassy sent to Rome to establish trade ties and obtain coral to construct a protective net over the Maha Thupa.
45 CE	Chandamukha	Sinhala diplomatic envoys (Rachias)	Claudius (Roman Empire)	Diplomatic embassy dispatched from Sri Lanka to Rome during the reign of Emperor Claudius to establish commercial and diplomatic ties.
c. 114–136	Gajabahu I	Sinhala diplomatic envoys	Emperor An (Han dynasty)	First recorded diplomatic mission sent from Sri Lanka to the Imperial Court of Han China.
361	Upatissa I	Sinhala diplomatic envoys	Julian (Roman Empire)	Embassy dispatched to Constantinople and received by Emperor Julian, establishing high political standing in Roman records.
414	Mahanama	Sinhala envoys	Emperor An (Eastern Jin dynasty)	Diplomatic mission arriving in China to present court greetings and establish maritime trade ties.
428	Mahanama	Sinhala diplomatic envoys	Emperor Taiwu (Northern Wei)	Embassy sent to the Northern Wei court bearing a 5-foot jade Buddha statue carved as a diplomatic gift.
429	Mahanama	Bhikkhuni Devasara & nuns	Emperor Taiwu (Northern Wei)	Delegation of Sri Lankan nuns sent to China aboard a ship owned by Nandi, carrying a sapling of the Sacred Bodhi tree to establish the Bhikkhuni ordination lineage.
433	Mahanama	Second delegation of Sri Lankan nuns	Emperor Taiwu (Northern Wei)	Second delegation arriving at Nanlin Temple in Nanjing, performing the first dual ordination (Upasampada) for Chinese nuns.
456	Dhatusena	Nanda (monk and sculptor) & envoys	Emperor Xiaowen (Northern Wei)	Religious mission of five monks sent to China, featuring a master sculptor who crafted revered Buddha statues for the Chinese court.
Between 508-516	Kumara Dhatusena	Royal envoys		Kumara Dhatusena had sent a message to the Chinese king on his coronation, saying he would love to visit China.
c. 531–578	Silakala or Aggabodhi I	Sinhala diplomatic envoys	Khosrow I (Sassanid Empire)	Embassy dispatched to Iran presenting ten elephants, 200,000 pieces of teak wood, and seven pearl divers to King Anusharwan.
623–627	Aggabodhi III	Sinhala diplomatic envoys	Emperor Gaozu (Tang dynasty)	Embassy sent to Chang'an to establish official diplomatic and tributary ties with the Tang Empire.
628–639	Aggabodhi III	Sinhala goodwill messenger	Muhammad (Medina)	Goodwill diplomatic mission sent to Prophet Muhammad at Medina to learn of early Islamic developments in Arabia.
742–750	Aggabodhi VI	Amoghavajra & Sri Lankan envoys	Emperor Xuanzong (Tang dynasty)	Buddhist and diplomatic missions sent to the Tang court presenting gifts, including pearls, gemstones, ivory, rare birds and sacred manuscripts.
	Aggabodhi VI			One of four diplomatic missions sent to China by Aggabodhi VI.
	Aggabodhi VI			One of four diplomatic missions sent to China by Aggabodhi VI.
	Aggabodhi VI			One of four diplomatic missions sent to China by Aggabodhi VI.
c. 8th century	Aggabodhi VII	Royal envoys	Abbasid Caliphate	Mission sent to the Caliph escorting the orphaned daughters of Arab merchants who had died in Sri Lanka.
989	Mahinda V	Sinhala trade envoys	Emperor Taizong (Song dynasty)	Diplomatic mission sent to Northern Song China to secure maritime trade privileges amidst rising Chola regional power.
Polonnaruwa period (1017–1232)
Between 1055–1071	Vijayabahu I	Sinhalese royal envoys	Anawrahta (Pagan Kingdom)	Mission sent to Burma with gifts and a letter written with the kings own hand in Pali, requesting military-economic aid against Chola forces. Anawrahta sent "many ships', laden with merchandise.
1071	Vijayabahu I	Sinhalese royal envoys	Anawrahta (Pagan Kingdom)	Mission requesting for learned Bhikkhus to restore the sangha and ordination line in Sri Lanka, which had suffered a setback due to Cola occupation.
	Parakramabahu I	Sinhalese royal envoys	(Khmer Empire)	A Sinhalese princess was sent to the Khmer Empire (Cambodia) during the time of Parakramabahu I.
	Parakramabahu I	Sinhalese royal envoys	Alaungsithu (Pagan Kingdom)	Mission sent to Pagan to maintain trade and religious ties, which ultimately degenerated into conflict leading to the Parakramabahu I invasion of Burma.
1187–1196	Nissanka Malla	Sinhalese royal envoys	Narapatisithu (Pagan Kingdom)	Diplomatic and religious mission sent to Burma carrying sacred Buddhist relics to strengthen inter-monastic alliances.
13th century		Minister Ñāna	Narapatisithu (Pagan Kingdom)	Thera Nāgasena of Rambā Viharaya in Sri Lanka sent a letter via a Minister named Ñāna to Mahathera Kassapa in Arimaddanapura (Bagan), urging him to purify the Sāsana in Bagan.
Transitional period (1232–1592)
1236–1270	Parakramabahu II	Royal diplomatic envoys	Sri Indraditya (Sukhothai Kingdom)	Early diplomatic and religious exchanges initiated with the Sukhodaya Kingdom in modern Thailand.
1273–1294	Bhuvanekabahu I	Five Sinhalese embassies	Kublai Khan (Yuan dynasty)	Series of five diplomatic missions sent to the Mongol court in China to negotiate commercial rights and safeguard sacred relics.
April 1283	Bhuvanekabahu I	Sinhalese embassy led by Al-Haj Abu Bakr	Qalawun (Mamluk Sultanate)	Diplomatic and commercial mission sent to Cairo to propose direct trade ties between Sri Lanka and Egypt.
1293	Parakramabahu III	Sinhalese diplomatic envoy	Kublai Khan (Yuan dynasty)	Diplomatic response and commercial negotiation mission dispatched to the Mongol (Yuan) court in Beijing.
1411–1412	Parakramabahu Āpāna	Vira Alakesvara & Sinhalese delegation	Yongle Emperor (Ming dynasty)	Delegation sent to Nanjing following the Ming–Kotte War; the captive King Alakesvara was pardoned and returned to Sri Lanka by the Ming court.
1416–1459	Parakramabahu VI	Kotte diplomatic envoys	Ming Emperors (Ming dynasty)	6 diplomatic missions sent to China in 1416, 1421, 1430, 1433, 1436, and 1459 to solidify trade routes and sovereign recognition following Zheng He's voyages.
c. 1429	Parakramabahu VI	Srīsaddhammālankāra & Sīhala Māhasāmi	Mohnyin Thado (Ava Kingdom)	Monastic delegation sent to Upper Myanmar to settle in Ava and collaborate with local scholars to advance Pali scholarship.
1470–1478	Parakramabahu VI	Naval commanders & envoys	Tanjore Court	Diplomatic and naval expedition sent to retaliate against a port in Tanjore after Sinhalese merchants were mistreated there.
1541–1542	Bhuvanekabahu VII	Sri Ramaraska Pandita & embassy	John III (Kingdom of Portugal)	Landmark embassy sent to Lisbon carrying a golden effigy of Prince Dharmapala to secure Portuguese confirmation of his royal succession.
Kandyan period (1592–1815)
1636–1637	Rajasinha II	Kandyan diplomatic envoys	Anthony van Diemen (VOC Batavia)	Mission dispatched to VOC headquarters in Batavia seeking a military alliance against the Portuguese, leading to the Luso-Dutch War in Ceylon and the Kandyan-Dutch Treaty of 1638.
1664	Rajasinha II	Kandyan diplomatic envoys	Joan Maetsuyker (VOC Batavia)	Embassy dispatched to Batavia to negotiate territorial concessions and trade monopolies along coastal Sri Lanka.
1679	Rajasinha II	Kandyan envoys	Rijklof van Goens (VOC Batavia)	Diplomatic mission sent to Batavia seeking peace talks and trade arrangements regarding cinnamon collection.
1693	Vimaladharmasuriya II	Kandyan religious envoys	Muni Thudhammaraza (Kingdom of Mrauk U)	Diplomatic and religious mission sent to Arakan (Burma) to secure Theravada Buddhist monks for restoring higher ordination (Upasampada) rites.
1696	Vimaladharmasuriya II	Kandyan religious envoys	Sanda Thuriya I or Nawrahta of Mrauk-U (Kingdom of Mrauk U)	Follow-up embassy dispatched to Arakan to escort thirty-three monks back to Kandy, successfully re-establishing the monastic lineage in Sri Lanka.
1697	Vimaladharmasuriya II	Kandyan religious envoys	Mayuppiya or Kalamandat (Kingdom of Mrauk U)	Mission sent to Arakan (Rakhine State, Myanmar) to request senior monks to re-establish higher ordination in Sri Lanka.
1706	Vira Narendra Sinha	Kandyan royal envoys	Mangammal (Madurai Nayak dynasty)	Diplomatic mission sent to Madurai to arrange a royal marriage alliance between the Kandyan court and a Nayak princess.
1739	Vira Narendra Sinha	Kandyan royal envoys	(Madurai Nayak dynasty)	Embassy sent following the death of King Vira Narendra Sinha to formalize succession and dynastic ties with the Nayak royal house.
1741	Sri Vijaya Rajasinha	Kandyan embassy led by Doranegama Rala	Borommakot (Ayutthaya Kingdom)	First Kandyan mission sent to Siam requesting Buddhist monks; the ship was wrecked off the coast of Pegu on its return voyage.
1745–1747	Sri Vijaya Rajasinha	Kandyan embassy led by Trishinhala	Borommakot (Ayutthaya Kingdom)	Mission dispatched to Siam to request a delegation of monks; though received warmly by King Borommakot, political instability delayed the return of the monks.
1747	Sri Vijaya Rajasinha	Kandyan religious envoys	Borommakot (Ayutthaya Kingdom)	Religious revival mission sent to Ayutthaya, Thailand; encountered a shipwreck off the coast of Pegu (Myanmar) and returned incomplete.
1750–1753	Kirti Sri Rajasinha	Ellepola Mohottala & Wilbagedara Muhandiram	Borommakot (Ayutthaya Kingdom)	Landmark diplomatic mission organized by Weliwita Sri Saranankara Thero to Ayutthaya; returned in 1753 with Upali Thera and Thai monks, re-establishing the Siam Nikaya.
1762–1765	Kirti Sri Rajasinha	Pybus-contact envoys	George Pigot / Robert Palk (British Madras)	Secret diplomatic missions sent to Fort St. George (Madras) seeking military aid and naval support against the Dutch during the Dutch–Kandyan War.
1795	Sri Rajadhi Rajasinha	Kandyan court delegates	Lord Hobart (British Madras)	Anti-Dutch diplomatic mission sent to Madras, culminating in agreements that aided the British takeover of Dutch coastal settlements in 1796.
March 1798–May 1800	Sri Rajadhi Rajasinha	Welitara Ñānawimalatissa Thera along with 5 Samaneras and 2 lay devote	Bodawpaya (Konbaung dynasty)	Mission dispatched from Galle to Amarapura to obtain Higher Ordination (Upasampadā), leading to the establishment of the Amarapura Nikāya in Sri Lanka.
1799–1800	Sri Vikrama Rajasinha	Ambagahapitiye Gnanavimala Thera & envoys	Bodawpaya (Konbaung dynasty)	Delegation sent to Burma to obtain higher ordination outside the caste-restricted Kandyan establishment, founding the Amarapura Nikaya lineage.
early 1800s	Sri Vikrama Rajasinha	Kandyan local envoys	Bodawpaya (Konbaung dynasty)	Sovereign defense missions dispatched seeking external resistance support against British encroachment prior to the annexation of Kandy in 1815.
1806	Sri Vikrama Rajasinha	Bogahapitiye Dhammajoti, Attudave Dhammarakkhitatissa, & Kataluwe Gunaratanatissa	Bodawpaya (Konbaung dynasty)	Monastic delegations sent to Amarapura and Bago to receive higher ordination at the Suvannaguhā Sīmā and Kalyāni Sīmā.
September 1807	Sri Vikrama Rajasinha	Kataluwe Gunaratanatissa Thera & Ven. Bogahawatte Jayatujinatissa	Bodawpaya (Konbaung dynasty)	Monastic delegation sent to Amarapura and Bago to receive higher ordination at the Suvannaguhā Sīmā and Kalyāni Sīmā.
March 1809–June 1810	Sri Vikrama Rajasinha	Kataluwe Gunaratanatissa and 7 Samaneras	Bodawpaya (Konbaung dynasty)	Kataluwe Günaratanatissa and the Samaneras received upsampadâ under the Sanghanàyaka Mâdhânanda Dhaja at the Kalyâni Simâ. Upon returning Kataluwe Günaratanatissa Thera established the Lanka Kalyâni Vamsa Nikàya, a branch of the Amarapura Nikaya, in Dodanduwa.
Mid-19th century	None (British Colonial Era)	Sri Lankan monastic deputations	Mindon Min (Konbaung dynasty)	Three separate deputations sent to Mandalay to seek rulings from the Myanmar Sangharāja on Vinaya and sīmā boundary disputes.
February 1861–18 August 1862	None (British Colonial Era)	Ambagahawatte Saranankara & Puvakdandawe Paññānanda	Mindon Min (Konbaung dynasty)	Monastic delegation traveling to Mandalay and Bago for re-ordination under Myanmar preceptors, later founding the Rāmañña Nikāya in 1864.

== See also ==
- List of missions to Sri Lanka
- Foreign relations of Sri Lanka
