= Polonnaruwa–Pagan War =

12th-century war in Southern Asia

Date	1165–1181
Location	Pagan Kingdom
Result	Polonnaruwa victory

Polonnaruwa–Pagan War were a series of successful military expeditions led-by Sinhalese king Parakramabahu the Great against the Bagan Kingdom between 1165 and 1181. It occurred as a result of a trade dispute between the two states.

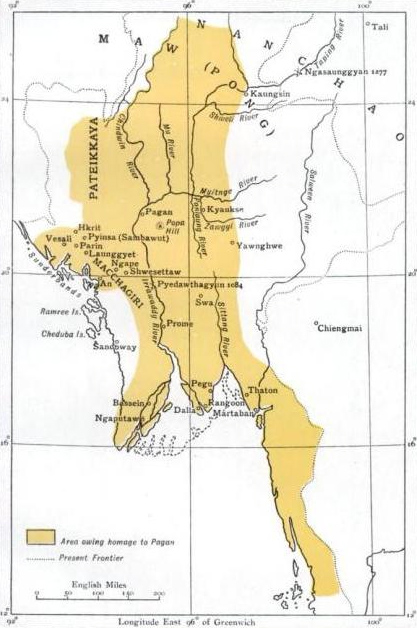
Map of the Pagan Kingdom in the 12th Century.

== Background ==
Diplomatic and cultural relations with Burma and Polonnaruwa existed long since the rise of the Burmese Pagan dynasty in the 9th century. After the Chola conquest of Anuradhapura, Sri Lanka experienced a decline in Buddhism and Vijayabahu I, who was the monarch of Polonnaruwa during the time, requested Buddhist monks from Pagan Burma to restore the Sangha in Sri Lanka. Historical chronicles state that king Vijayabahu also offered the Thihoshin Pagoda to Pagan king Alaungsithu in the 11th century, which is now still in the region of Pakkoku in modern Burma.

However the friendly relations with Pagan got disrupted with the accession of Narathu to the Burmese throne. Narathu claimed the throne by assassinating Alaungsithu, and he was quite unfavored among the Burmese people. Hostilities with the Khmers and Burma too further changed the pleasant situation between the two countries. According to Sri Lankan sources, Narathu deprived the envoys of the King of Polonnaruwa the maintenance they were previously granted. He also issued an order prohibiting the sale of elephants to foreign countries and did away with the age old custom of presenting an elephant to every foreign vessel which brought him gifts. He later had the Sri Lankan envoys imprisoned and tortured, and had all their possessions, including their money, their elephants and their vessels confiscated. He perceived insults to the Sri Lankan ambassador from Burma and later summoned them and declared,

Henceforth no vessel from the Sinhala country shall be sent to my kingdom. Give us now in writing the declaration that if [messengers] from there are again sent to us, in case we should slay the envoys who have come here, no blame of any kind will attach to us. If yer give not the declaration yer shall not have permission to return home.

Whether from these tensions or for other reasons, Parakkamabahu I prepared a navy at Pallavavanka and then dispatched a naval fleet to conduct a military raid.

== Historic invasions ==
=== First Invasion of Burma (1164–1165) ===
A fleet was collected at the port of Paluvak-tota, perhaps Palvakki on the coast north of Trincomalee; it set sail in the south-west monsoon. The army's size is unknown, but it is recorded as containing a year's supply of grains, specially modified arrows, and Sri Lanka's fearsome war elephants. The army arrived on the banks of the Bago river, and captured a city. Thereafter, the armies are said to have captured several other cities, including Arimaddhanapura, Bagan's capital, where they assassinated Narathu and, facing their defeat, the Burmese requested their Sangha to resolve the situation, leading to a peace treaty between the Burmese and Sinhalese Buddhist Sangha.

However, the account of the campaign in Bagan is possibly exaggerated, particularly as Burmese chronicles do not contain any information on a massive invasion from Lanka. Nevertheless there is evidence to indicate that there was some form of campaign undertaken, and that it was a successful one. The story of a Sri Lankan invasion that dethroned Narathu is known in Myanmar. Furthermore, a contemporary inscription at Devanagala mentions the awarding of land to the general Kitti Nagaragiri for his leadership in a campaign to 'Ramanna', naming the king of Bagan as 'Bhuvanaditta', a possible Sinhalization of 'Narathu'.

=== Second Invasion of Burma (1180–1181) ===
Historian George Coedes states that a further retaliatory raid was launched by Parakramabahu in 1180, after Narapatisithu, the successor of Narathu imprisoned Sinhalese envoys, tradesmen, and a princess on her way to the Khmer Empire. The tensions and wars between Polonnaruwa and Pagan then ended with a peace agreement in 1181.
