= King Loka =

King of Anuradhapura-in-exile from 1048 to 1054

Loka

King of Anuradhapura-in-exile
- Reign: 1048–1054
- Predecessor: Parakrama Pandu
- Successor: Kassapa VII
- Died: 1054

Sri Lankan Monarchs during the Chola occupation (993–1070)
- 1. Mahinda V (982–1029); 2. Kassapa VI (1029–1040); 3. Kitti (1040); 4. Mahālāna-Kitti (1040–1042); 5. Vikkama Pandu (1042–1043); 6. Jagatīpāla (1043–1046); 7. Parakrama Pandu (1046–1048); 8. Loka (1048–1054); 9. Kassapa VII (1054–1055); 10. Vijayabahu I (1055–1110)

Loka (Sinhala: ලෝක), (died 1054) also known as Lokissara or Lokesvara was the King of Anuradhapura-in-exile from 1048 to 1054. He governed primarily from the southern region of Rohana, which served as the stronghold for Sinhalese resistance while the capital city of Anuradhapura was under attack and occupied by the Chola Empire. Loka was a military leader who took possession of the government upon the death of Parakrama Pandu. He ruled for six years over Rohaṇa and had his seat of government in Kājaragāma. The Pūjāvaliya, however offers an alternative placing his seat at Mandakavidu Tota.

The Cūḷavaṃsa identifies Loka as a native of Makkhakudrūsa who rose to prominence as an army commander, and does not describe him as a member of the royal dynasty. Unlike many claimants who emerged during this 11th century dark decade, he lacked a clearly defined royal pedigree, as the Sinhalese dynastic line was regarded as effectively extinct after the death of Kassapa VI. Loka assumed authority in Rohana following the death of Parakrama Pandu, who had been killed by Chola forces. While Rohana functioned as the principal base of Sinhalese resistance and was regarded as the "stronghold of freedom, the Chola occupation was still limited to the northern Rajarata region. Despite internal divisions, Loka is credited in the chronicles with "breaking the arrogance of the Colas" and safeguarding both the Buddhist order and the lay population at a time when foreign forces were devastating the island. He succeeded in maintaining an indigenous administration in the south, even as the Chola viceroy ruled the north from Polonnaruwa.

While dealing with the Chola forces, Loka also faced internal rivals—principally a chieftain named Buddharāja who quarrelled with him and fled to Cunnasālā. Buddharāja established an independent armed camp at the foothills of the Malaya mountains at Hunuvala near Opanayake, where he was joined by Prince Kitti. During this period, Buddharāja became the protector of the young Prince Kitti, a descendant of the royal house and the future Vijayabahu I. Kitti emerged as a major opponent of Loka, leading to a series of skirmishes between the combined forces of Buddharāja and Kitti against Loka at Bovala near Kirama in the district of Hunuvala. Loka was ultimately defeated at Remuna and died soon after. He was succeeded by Kassapa VII.

Sources record the existence of two gold coins during his reign preserved in the British Museum, making him one of the very few rulers of this turbulent period known to have issued a recognized currency.

== See also ==
- Chola conquest of Anuradhapura
- List of Sri Lankan monarchs

King Loka Died: 1054
Regnal titles
Preceded by Parakrama Pandu	King of Anuradhapura; 1048–1054	Succeeded by Kassapa VII
