= Vikkama Pandu =

King of Anuradhapura-in-exile from 1042 to 1043

King of Anuradhapura-in-exile
- Reign: 1042–1043
- Predecessor: Mahālāna-Kitti
- Successor: Jagatīpāla
- Died: 1043
- Issue: Parakrama Pandu
- Father: Mahālāna-Kitti

Sri Lankan Monarchs during the Chola occupation (993–1070)
- 1. Mahinda V (982–1029); 2. Kassapa VI (1029–1040); 3. Kitti (1040); 4. Mahālāna-Kitti (1040–1042); 5. Vikkama Pandu (1042–1043); 6. Jagatīpāla (1043–1046); 7. Parakrama Pandu (1046–1048); 8. Loka (1048–1054); 9. Kassapa VII (1054–1055); 10. Vijayabahu I (1055–1110)

Vikkama Pandu (Sinhala: වික්කමපාණ්ඩු), (died 1043) also known as or Vikrama Pandita was the King of Anuradhapura-in-exile from 1042 to 1043. He reigned primarily from Rohana as the capital of the Anuradhapura kingdom was under attack from the Chola Empire and Rohana functioned as the base for the Sinhalese resistance. The son of Mahālāna-Kitti, he lived in exile in Duludesa, likely located in South India, during the Chola occupation, when upon learning of the events in Sri Lanka, he returned to Rohaṇa to carry on the resistance after his fathers death. Vikkama Pandu ruled from Kālatittha, situated at the western edge of the Rohana. This decision appears to have been motivated more by considerations of personal security than by administrative effectiveness, as Kālatittha lay farther from the principal Chola centers of power.

Ruling primarily from Kālatittha on the western edge of Rohaṇa, Vikkama Pandu chose this location likely for personal safety, as it was farther from the core Chola strongholds, rather than for administrative efficiency. His brief reign occurred during Rohana's "dark decade," a period marked by internal division and turmoil. After the end of the legitimate Sinhalese royal line with the death of Kassapa VI, local forces accepted leaders of Pandya or North Indian origin to fight Cola dominance. Historical accounts differ on his time in power, the Cūlavaṃsa states he ruled for one year, while the Rājāvaliya credits him with a three-year reign. Vikkamapandu was ultimately killed in battle by his successor, Jagatīpāla.

== See also ==
- Chola conquest of Anuradhapura
- List of Sri Lankan monarchs

Vikkama Pandu Died: 1043
Regnal titles
Preceded by Mahālāna-Kitti	King of Anuradhapura; 1042–1043	Succeeded by Jagatīpāla
