= Mahinda IV =

King of Anuradhapura (c. 956–972)

Mahinda IV හතරවන මහින්ද
- Maharaja; Siri Saṅgbo Abhā
- Mihintale Slab Inscription of Mahinda IV

King of Anuradhapura
- Reign: c. 956–972 CE
- Predecessor: Sena IV
- Successor: Sena V
- Died: c. 972 CE
- Spouse: Unnamed Kalinga princess
- Issue: Sena V Mahinda V
Names
- Mihindu; Sirisaṅgbo Mahind
- Dynasty: House of Lambakanna II
- Father: Udaya III
- Mother: Deva
- Religion: Theravada Buddhism

Mahinda IV also known as Mihindu IV (Sinhala: හතරවන මහින්ද/මිහිඳු), ( 956–972 CE), was a king of the Anuradhapura Kingdom of Sri Lanka. He was one of the later kings of the Lambakanna II dynasty and is mainly known from a large number of inscriptions found in different parts of the country.

His reign is especially important because his inscriptions give detailed information about Buddhist monasteries, land, taxes, workers, money, irrigation works and the administration of religious institutions. His father was Udaya III, and his mother was Queen Deva. His maternal grandfather was Kassapa IV.

During his reign, there were invasions from south India and he successfully defeated them. According to the chronicles, an invader named Vallabha invaded the north of Sri Lanka and was defeated by a Sinhalese general, Sena. According to south Indian chola Inscriptions, a general named Sriyavelar died in a battle in Sri Lanka.

== Reign ==
Mahinda IV succeeded Sena IV and was succeeded by Sena V. His reign is generally dated to about 956–972 CE, although the exact chronology of the later Anuradhapura kings has been debated by historians. His inscriptions give secure regnal dates, including records from his tenth and sixteenth regnal years.

Mahinda IV had held important positions before becoming king. The Mihintale inscription describes him as having held the titles of Apa and Mahaya before he became ruler.

The inscriptions of Mahinda IV show that the king was closely involved with the administration of Buddhist monasteries. They give rules about monks, officials, servants, land, money and the use of monastery property. These records are some of the best evidence for understanding how Buddhist institutions were managed in Sri Lanka during the later Anuradhapura period.

The Mihintale inscriptions are among the most important records from his reign. They contain detailed rules for the monastery and its workers and describe the handling of income and expenditure. The inscriptions also show that the king worked with the monastic community when establishing these regulations.

The inscriptions mention rules connected with both Mihintale and Abhayagiri. This shows that royal interest in Buddhist institutions was not limited to one monastery.

Mahinda IV also gave land and other property to Buddhist institutions. Some of his inscriptions contain immunity grants, protecting monastery lands and villages from certain officials and taxes. Records connected with Vessagiriya, Divurumvela and Polonnaruva provide examples of these grants.

One inscription from Anuradhapura concerns lands and villages connected with the temple of the Sacred Tooth Relic. It gives information about the administration of these lands and the protection of religious property.

Mahinda IV was also involved in the repair and construction of Buddhist buildings. The Dambegoda pillar inscription, dated to his tenth regnal year, records the construction of the Magul Maha Pirivena and the giving of the four basic requirements to monks. It also mentions Buddha images, a relic house and other religious works.

The same inscription mentions several important Buddhist establishments, including the Mahavihara, Mahapaya, Ruwanwelisaya, Mahiyangana, Polonnaruwa and Thuparamaya. This shows the wide area of royal patronage during his reign.

Water management was another part of Mahinda's rule. A fragmentary inscription from Anuradhapura refers to a water pavilion connected with Ratnamal Pirivena.

The Dambegoda pillar inscription also records the restoration of ruined reservoirs. The inscription says that the restored water facilities helped to reduce famine in Sri Lanka. This is the claim made by the inscription, and the exact size of the famine is not known from other evidence.

== Inscriptions ==
A large number of inscriptions are connected with the reign of Mahinda IV. Important examples include the Mihintale inscriptions, the Dambegoda pillar inscription, the Anuradhapura slab inscription and inscriptions from Jetavanaramaya, Vessagiriya, Divurumvela and Polonnaruwa.

The Mihintale inscriptions are particularly valuable because they give detailed information about the administration of a Buddhist monastery. They mention monks, officials, servants, income, expenditure and monastery property.

The Dambegoda pillar gives information about religious buildings, donations and the repair of reservoirs.

Other inscriptions show that monasteries were given land and other property and that the king placed rules on how these resources should be managed. Modern historians have used these records to study the economic and administrative side of Buddhist monasteries in ancient Sri Lanka.

== Death and succession ==
Mahinda IV died around 972 CE according to the commonly used chronology. He was succeeded by his son Sena V. The Mahavamsa says that Sena V was about twelve years old when he became king.

The exact circumstances of Mahinda IV's death are not known.

== Legacy ==
Mahinda IV is important mainly because of the large number of inscriptions left from his reign. They give a much clearer picture of how Buddhist monasteries were organised and how their land, money and workers were managed.

His reign also shows the continued importance of royal support for Buddhism, irrigation and religious buildings during the later Anuradhapura period. The inscriptions give more information about administration and religion than about Mahinda's personal life, making him one of the better documented kings of the later Anuradhapura Kingdom.

== See also ==
- Anuradhapura Kingdom
- List of monarchs of Sri Lanka
- Mihintale
- Abhayagiri Vihara
- Mahavihara
- Chola dynasty
- Sena V
- Mahinda V

Mahinda IV House of Lambakanna II Born: ? ? Died: ? ?
Regnal titles
Preceded by Sena IV	King of Anuradhapura; 975–991	Succeeded by Sena V
