= Mahinda II =

- King of Anuradhapura
- Reign: 787 – 807
- Predecessor: Aggabodhi VII
- Successor: Dappula II
- Spouse: Sangha
- Issue: Udaya from Queen Sangha Dappula II
- Dynasty: House of Lambakanna II
- Religion: Theravada Buddhism

Mahinda II (aka Silamegha) was King of Anuradhapura in the 9th century, whose reign lasted from 787 to 807. He succeeded Aggabodhi VII as King of Anuradhapura and was succeeded by his son Dappula II. His father was King Aggabodhi VI.

== Early Life and Reign ==
On the death of King Aggabodhi VII, he arrived in Anuradhapura from Mahathiththa to find disorder in the capital. He reassured his king's widow, Sangha, that she could reign and that he would rule in her name. He was ruling as the sub-king when the chieftains and landlords of the northern regions withheld their royal dues. He attacked them and subdued them.

Queen Sangha was then provoked by some of the chieftains to try to murder Yuvaraja (Sub-King) Mahinda. He defeated the Queen's forces and took the Queen prisoner and crowned himself as King Mahinda II.

== Rebellion ==
His cousin, Dappula, raised the banner of the rebellion from Ruhuna and advanced as far as Kala wewa and Sangha gama, Mahinda II advanced with the Queen and defeated Dappula. He could not exploit his victory because news reached him of the northern chieftains seizing Anuradhapura. However, he was able to retake the Anuradhapura and ruled peacefully for a few years.

Dappula used these years to rearm himself and gather another force with two other cousins attacked Malaya Rata and captured it. Gathering more forces he surrounded the capital. The noise of his army was so great it was said that "heavens were like to rend asunder". King Mahinda II took counsel with his ministers and generals (senapathis) who declared that "what advantage to the king would be of maintaining in great pomp if they were to draw back at the hour of his (King's) need". Heartened by this, the king assembled his army and led it to victory once more. Dappula's two cousins were arrested, Dappula himself managed to escape to Ruhuna.

The northern and eastern areas of the country was then subjugated with many inhabitants of those regions inducted into the army. He reigned supreme for a few more years and married the captive Queen Sangha. She gave birth to a son named Dappula.

From Ruhuna, Dappula made his third attempt at rebellion with the help of two brothers from east of the country. They set up camp on the western bank of the Mahaweliganga. The king left a smaller garrison in Anuradhapura and marched to meet Dappula with his army. Dappula shifted his camp to Kovilara where they were attacked and routed by the King's forces. Dappula escaped to Ruhuna once again and there raised an army for the defence of the Ruhuna.

Mahinda consulted monks and the wise men of the realm at Thuparama and on their advice advanced to Ruhuna to finally rid the country of Dappula. He took up a position on a hill called Marapabbatha which was impregnable. In response, Dappula sent peace emissaries to the King and peace prevailed in the country. A large tribute of horses, elephants and gems were extracted from Dappula and the Kaluganga river was fixed as the western boundary of the Ruhuna.

== Legacy and Death ==
During this peaceful time, Mahinda devoted his efforts to further the religion and the welfare of his subjects for the remainder of his reign. He engaged in many other building works and repaired numerous religious buildings. He gave alms to monks and Brahmins alike.

Mahinda built the dama vihara and another called Sannira-tittha at Polonnaruwa. He also built a monastery called Mahaleka affiliated to Abhayagiriya. He built a magnificent terraced and many storied palace called Rathnaprasada with a gold Buddha statue inside. He made a cover of gold circled with silver bands for the Thuparama Dagoba. He also had repaired the Vatadageya at Thuparamaya. The floodgates of Kalawea was repaired during his reign.

His son Dappula succeeded him as King Dappula II.

== See also ==
- List of Sri Lankan monarchs
- History of Sri Lanka

Mahinda II House of Lambakanna II Born: 761 ? Died: 807
Regnal titles
| Preceded by Aggabodhi VII | King of Anuradhapura; 787–807 | Succeeded by Dappula II |
