= Sena I =

Sena I පළමුවන සේන
- Abhā Salamevan

King of Anuradhapura and Ruhuna
- Reign: 833 – 853
- Predecessor: Aggabodhi IX
- Successor: Sena II
- Spouse: Queen Consort Samgha
Names
- Silāmegha Sena
- Dynasty: House of Lambakanna II
- Father: Dappula III
- Religion: Theravada Buddhism

Sena I (Sinhala: පළමුවන සේන) was a Sinhala king of the Anuradhapura Kingdom in Sri Lanka from 833 to 853 A.D. or 846 to 866 A.D. He was the second son of King Dappula III and succeeded his elder brother Aggabodhi IX in 833 A.D. His reign was marked by succession disputes, the assassination of a rival claimant, a major Pandyan invasion of Sri Lanka, political instability in Rohana, and the reorganisation of royal succession. Later he was succeeded by his nephew Sena II.

== Early life and accession ==
Sena I was born as the second son of King Dappula III. He had four brothers, Aggabodhi IX, Mahinda, Kassapa, and Udaya and a sister named Deva. Following the death of his elder brother King Aggabodhi IX, Sena I ascended the throne of Anuradhapura in 833 A.D.

After his accession, he appointed Samgha as his queen-consort and conferred the office of Yuvaraja (heir apparent) upon his brother Mahinda.

== Succession dispute and assassination of Mahinda ==
The succession to the throne had earlier been complicated by the actions of Sena I’s father, Dappula III. Mahinda III, elder brother of Dappula II, had a son also named Mahinda who was considered the rightful heir to the kingship after Dappula II. However, Dappula II bypassed this claim and secured the succession for his own sons. As a result, the rival claimant Mahinda fled to India.

Following his accession, Sena I viewed his cousin Mahinda as a continuing threat to the stability of his rule. To eliminate this danger, he reportedly dispatched agents to India, who succeeded in assassinating Mahinda.

== Pandyan invasion ==
During the early years of Sena I’s reign, the Pandyan king Srimara Srivallabha (r. 815–862 A.D.) launched an invasion of northern Sri Lanka, particularly the region known as Uttaradesa.

Sena I sent the royal forces to repel the invasion; however, the Sinhalese army suffered defeat. During the campaign, the Yuvaraja Mahinda, who had taken part in the battle, committed suicide following the military disaster.

After learning of the defeat, Sena I withdrew to the Malaya Rata. During subsequent fighting, his brother Adipada Kassapa was also killed by the invading forces. Of Sena I’s brothers, only Udaya survived.

The Pandyan army captured Anuradhapura, looted the capital, and caused extensive destruction to Buddhist religious establishments. Meanwhile, Sena I established a defensive position in the southern regions near the confluence of the Mahaweli Ganga and Amban Ganga rivers.

== Treaty with Srimara Srivallabha ==
Despite the success of the invasion, the Pandyan king did not intend to permanently occupy Sri Lanka. Srimara Srivallabha initiated negotiations through an envoy and proposed a treaty.

Sena I accepted the agreement, after which control of the kingdom was restored to him and the Pandyan forces withdrew from the island.

== Appointment of heirs ==
Following his restoration, Sena I appointed his last surviving brother Udaya as Yuvaraja. However, Udaya soon fell ill and died.

The king subsequently appointed Sena (later Sena II), the son of his slain brother Kassapa, as heir apparent.

== Affairs in Rohana ==
Sena I’s sister Deva had been married to Kittaggabodhi, the ruler of Rohana in southern Sri Lanka. After Kittaggabodhi’s death, his sister seized power and murdered Mahinda, the eldest son of the deceased ruler.

The remaining members of the royal family the three sons and three daughters fled to the court of Sena I. The king received them and raised them as members of the royal household.

When Kassapa, the eldest surviving son, reached maturity, Sena I provided him with military support and sent him to Rohana to reclaim his inheritance. Kassapa successfully defeated the usurper and restored control of the region with the assistance of his brothers Sena and Udaya.

The three daughters remained at the Anuradhapura court. The eldest among them, Samgha, later married Sena, the Yuvaraja.

== Works of King Sena I ==
Most of his time after the Pandyan attack was spent on rebuilding the monasteries destroyed by the Pandyan army.

Built a monastery for the Pansikulaka Bhikkus in Aritta Mountain (Ritigala).

Built a prasada of several stories in Jethavanarama Monastery.

Rebuilt the prasada destroyed by fire in Mahaparivena in Jethavanarama Monastery.

Built Virankuraramaya in Abhayuttara Viharaya (Abhayagiri Viharaya).

Built Pubbaramaya.

Built Samghasena sanghawasa in Maha Viharaya (Sansen Pirivena in Pujavaliya). This is possibly the Sangsen-Aram mentioned in inscriptions.

Built Senaggabodhi monastery at Thusavapi Reservoir in Polonnaruwa.

Built a Danashalawa (eating hall) at Mahanettapabbata Viharaya.

Built Kappura Parivena while he was a Mahadipada.

Built Uttaralha Parivena while he was a Mahadipada.

His Queen Samga built a sanghawasa (dwelling house) called Mahindasena in Abhayagiri Viharaya.

Completed the Dappulapabbata Viharaya which was started by Dappula II.

Completed the Kassaparajaka Viharaya which was started by a prince named Kassapa.

Built Minimevulepana in Girigala.

Built Minipa Pirivena in Dena Vehera.

His senapati called Bhadda built Bhaddasenapati Viharaya.

== Death and succession ==
Sena I died in 853 A.D. Following his death, the Yuvaraja Sena ascended the throne as King Sena II.

== See also ==
- List of Sri Lankan monarchs
- History of Sri Lanka

Sena I House of Lambakanna II Born: ? ? Died: ? ?
Regnal titles
Preceded by Aggabodhi IX	King of Anuradhapura; 846–866	Succeeded by Sena II
