= King Kitti =

King of Anuradhapura-in-exile in 1040

Kitti

King of Anuradhapura-in-exile
- Reign: 1040
- Predecessor: Kassapa VI
- Successor: Mahālāna-Kitti
- Died: 1040

Sri Lankan Monarchs during the Chola occupation (993–1070)
- 1. Mahinda V (982–1029); 2. Kassapa VI (1029–1040); 3. Kitti (1040); 4. Mahālāna-Kitti (1040–1042); 5. Vikkama Pandu (1042–1043); 6. Jagatīpāla (1043–1046); 7. Parakrama Pandu (1046–1048); 8. Loka (1048–1054); 9. Kassapa VII (1054–1055); 10. Vijayabahu I (1055–1110)

Kitti (Sinhala: කිත්ති) (d. 1040) was the King of Anuradhapura-in-exile for eight days in 1040. An official and Commander-in-chief of the court of Kassapa VI, he usurped the throne after the latters death. His reign was from Rohana as the capital of the Anuradhapura kingdom was under attack from the Chola Empire and Rohana functioned as the base for the Sinhalese resistance. Kitti was deposed by his successor Mahālāna-Kitti. Sinhalese sources often pass over his reign.

== See also ==
- Chola conquest of Anuradhapura
- List of Sri Lankan monarchs

King Kitti Died: 1042
Regnal titles
Preceded by Kassapa VI	King of Anuradhapura; 1040	Succeeded by Mahālāna-Kitti
