= Jagatīpāla =

King of Anuradhapura-in-exile from 1043 to 1046

King of Anuradhapura-in-exile
- Reign: 1043–1046
- Predecessor: Vikkama Pandu
- Successor: Parakrama Pandu
- Died: 1046
- Issue: Līlāvatī

Sri Lankan Monarchs during the Chola occupation (993–1070)
- 1. Mahinda V (982–1029); 2. Kassapa VI (1029–1040); 3. Kitti (1040); 4. Mahālāna-Kitti (1040–1042); 5. Vikkama Pandu (1042–1043); 6. Jagatīpāla (1043–1046); 7. Parakrama Pandu (1046–1048); 8. Loka (1048–1054); 9. Kassapa VII (1054–1055); 10. Vijayabahu I (1055–1110)

Jagatīpāla (Sinhala: ජගතීපාල), (died 1046) also known as or Jagathpala or Vīra Salameghan was the King of Anuradhapura-in-exile from 1043 to 1046. He governed primarily from the southern region of Rohana, which served as the stronghold for Sinhalese resistance while the capital city of Anuradhapura was under attack and occupied by the Chola Empire. Jagatīpāla killed in battle the reigning monarch Vikkama Pandu and took the throne for himself.

Following the end of the legitimate Sinhalese royal lineage with the death of Kassapa VI, local factions frequently turned to leaders of North Indian or Pandyan origin to fight against Chola domination. Consequently, Jagatīpāla's reign took place during a turbulent era known as the "dark decade," characterized by intense internal division and political instability. Historical accounts attribute foreign origins to Jagatīpāla, the Cūḷavaṃsa describes him as a prince descended from the line of Rāma who originated from Ayojjhā (Ayodhya) in North India, whereas South Indian Chola inscriptions refer to him as Vīra Salameghan of Kanyakubja (Kannauj). Although chroniclers identify him as the son of a sovereign, details of his early life remain sparse. While historical records credit him with a four-year reign as a strong ruler, they omit any reference to a formal Sinhalese consecration ceremony. Nevertheless, he remains recognized in the succession of Sinhalese monarchs.

The political landscape during Jagatpāla's rule was defined by foreign occupation and continuous unrest. A Chola viceroy administered the northern territory from Polonnaruva, while Rohana functioned as a base for anti-Chola forces. The southern region was severely unstable, with Jagatpāla being one of five different rulers who attempted to govern Rohana within a single decade. Under Chola king Rajadhiraja I, control tightened and punitive expeditions were repeatedly launched against southern claimants. Historical sources vary regarding the exact duration of his reign. The Cūḷavaṃsa states he ruled for four years, while the Rājāvaliya records a rule of only one year. Jagatīpāla's reign ended in 1046 when he was killed in battle against Chola forces. Following his defeat, Chola commanders captured his mahesī (chief queen), his daughter, and his royal possessions, transporting them as captives to the Chola mainland. His defeat further fractured the resistance in Rohana and cemented Chola dominance over Sri Lanka.

His daughter, Līlāvatī, survived and later became a prominent consort of Vijayabahu I.

== See also ==
- Chola conquest of Anuradhapura
- List of Sri Lankan monarchs

Jagatīpāla Died: 1046
Regnal titles
Preceded by Vikkama Pandu	King of Anuradhapura; 1043–1046	Succeeded by Parakrama Pandu
