= Kassapa VII =

King of Anuradhapura-in-exile from 1054 to 1055

King of Anuradhapura-in-exile
- Reign: 1054–1055
- Predecessor: Loka
- Successor: Vijayabahu I
- Died: 1055

Sri Lankan Monarchs during the Chola occupation (993–1070)
- 1. Mahinda V (982–1029); 2. Kassapa VI (1029–1040); 3. Kitti (1040); 4. Mahālāna-Kitti (1040–1042); 5. Vikkama Pandu (1042–1043); 6. Jagatīpāla (1043–1046); 7. Parakrama Pandu (1046–1048); 8. Loka (1048–1054); 9. Kassapa VII (1054–1055); 10. Vijayabahu I (1055–1110)

Kassapa VII (Sinhala: හත්වන කාස්සප), (d. 1055) was the King of Anuradhapura-in-exile from 1054 to 1055. He governed primarily from the southern region of Rohana, which served as the stronghold for Sinhalese resistance while the capital city of Anuradhapura was under attack and occupied by the Chola Empire. Kassapa was a military leader who took possession of the government upon the death of Loka. Prior to his rule, Kassapa served as a senior military commander and held the title of Kesadhātu-nāyaka ("Chief of the Kesadhātus"), indicating his guardianship over the sacred Hair Relic of the Buddha. Kassapa seized power in Kataragama (Kājaragāma) amid intense political instability, establishing himself as ruler during a tumultuous three-sided struggle for dominance over southern Sri Lanka. While primary chronicles like the Cūḷavaṃsa record his seat of power at Kataragama, the Pūjāvaliya alternatively places his capital at Mandakavidu Tota. Shortly after Kassapa's accession, the Chola viceroy based at Polonnaruwa dispatched an expeditionary force to dislodge him from Kājaragāma. Kassapa marched north and intercepted the invading force at Rakkhapasana (identifiable with modern Rakwana). He successfully routed the Chola troops and subsequently reinforced his northern frontier defenses before returning to his capital.

Despite his military success against the Cholas, Kassapa faced internal opposition from Chieftain Buddharāja, who had established a stronghold near the Malaya mountains to protect Prince Kitti (the legitimate heir to the Sinhalese throne and future Vijayabahu I). Refusing to submit to Prince Kitti's authority, Kassapa advanced westward to engage the royalist forces at Sippatthalaka. Realizing his troops were reluctant to fight against the rightful heir, Kassapa retreated to a fortified position at Kājaragāma. Prince Kitti’s forces pursued him, capturing Kataragama and besieging Khadiraṅgaṇī. Kassapa VII was killed in the ensuing battle in 1055, ending his six-month reign. Kassapa VII was the last in a succession of non-dynastic military leaders who ruled Ruhuna during the Chola occupation. His defeat allowed Prince Kitti to unite Ruhuna under legitimate royal authority, laying the foundational base for the eventual 15-year campaign that expelled the Chola forces and restored unified Sinhalese rule under Vijayabahu I.

== See also ==
- Chola conquest of Anuradhapura
- List of Sri Lankan monarchs

Kassapa VII Died: 1055
Regnal titles
Preceded by Loka	King of Anuradhapura; 1054–1055	Succeeded by Vijayabahu I
