= Mahālāna-Kitti =

King of Anuradhapura-in-exile from 1040 to 1042

King of Anuradhapura-in-exile
- Reign: 1040–1042
- Predecessor: Kitti
- Successor: Vikkama Pandu
- Died: 1042
- Issue: Vikkama Pandu

Sri Lankan Monarchs during the Chola occupation (993–1070)
- 1. Mahinda V (982–1029); 2. Kassapa VI (1029–1040); 3. Kitti (1040); 4. Mahālāna-Kitti (1040–1042); 5. Vikkama Pandu (1042–1043); 6. Jagatīpāla (1043–1046); 7. Parakrama Pandu (1046–1048); 8. Loka (1048–1054); 9. Kassapa VII (1054–1055); 10. Vijayabahu I (1055–1110)

Mahālāna-Kitti (Sinhala: මහාලාන කිත්ති), (died 1042) also known as or Mahālānakitti Mahalē or Mahalē was the King of Anuradhapura-in-exile from 1040 to 1042. He reigned primarily from Rohana as the capital of the Anuradhapura kingdom was under attack from the Chola Empire and Rohana functioned as the base for the Sinhalese resistance.

Mahālāna-Kitti, who was a prince, became king after he murdered Kitti, a court official and commander-in-chief of Kassapa VI who had briefly usurped the throne for eight days following Kassapa's death. Mahālāna-Kitti's reign lasted around 2 years and was defined almost entirely by defensive warfare against the Colas. He was defeated in the third year of his reign in battle with Cola forces and took his own life on the battlefield, cutting his throat with his own sword.

Following his death, the Chola forces looted royal treasures, including the regalia and royal diadem of the Sinhalese monarchy, which were sent back to the Chola monarch in India. He was succeeded by his son, Vikkama Pandu.

== See also ==
- Chola conquest of Anuradhapura
- List of Sri Lankan monarchs

Mahālāna-Kitti Died: 1042
Regnal titles
Preceded by Kitti	King of Anuradhapura; 1040–1042	Succeeded by Vikkama Pandu
