= Parakrama Pandu (Sinhalese king) =

King of Anuradhapura-in-exile from 1046 to 1048

King of Anuradhapura-in-exile
- Reign: 1046–1048
- Predecessor: Jagatīpāla
- Successor: Loka
- Died: 1048
- Father: Vikkama Pandu

Sri Lankan Monarchs during the Chola occupation (993–1070)
- 1. Mahinda V (982–1029); 2. Kassapa VI (1029–1040); 3. Kitti (1040); 4. Mahālāna-Kitti (1040–1042); 5. Vikkama Pandu (1042–1043); 6. Jagatīpāla (1043–1046); 7. Parakrama Pandu (1046–1048); 8. Loka (1048–1054); 9. Kassapa VII (1054–1055); 10. Vijayabahu I (1055–1110)

Parakrama Pandu (Sinhala: පරාක්‍රම පාණ්ඩු), (d. 1048) also known as Parakramabahu Pandi or Parakkanta was the King of Anuradhapura-in-exile from 1046 to 1048. He governed primarily from the southern region of Rohana, which served as the stronghold for Sinhalese resistance while the capital city of Anuradhapura was under attack and occupied by the Chola Empire. Parakrama Pandu was probably the son of Vikkama Pandu and succeeded Jagatīpāla upon his death.

Following the end of the legitimate Sinhalese royal line with the death of Kassapa VI, local factions frequently turned to leaders of North Indian or Pandyan origin to fight agaist Chola domination. Consequently, Parakrama Pandu reigned during a turbulent era known as the "dark decade," characterized by political instability and intense internal division. Unlike several of his immediate predecessors in Rohana who ruled without formal consecration, Parakrama Pandu was recognized as a sovereign ruler by the Sinhalese people. In practice, however, his authority was restricted to Rohana, while the Chola viceroy administered the island from Polonnaruwa. He was the last of five short-lived monarchs who attempted to govern Rohana during this decade of severe administrative breakdown. Like his predecessor Jagatīpāla, Parakrama Pandu was ultimately killed in battle during a Chola punitive expedition into the southern province. Upon his death, he was succeeded by Loka.

Historical knowledge of his reign relies mainly on literary accounts in the Cūḷavaṃsa and later Sinhalese chronicles such as the Pūjāvaliya. The chronicles offer varying details regarding the length of his reign: The Cūḷavaṃsa records a reign of two years. The Pūjāvaliya assigns him a reign of one year (referring to him as Parākramapandi). The Rājāvaliya extends his reign to six years (referring to him as Parākramabāhu-pandi). Nikāya Saṅgrahaya: Refers to him as Parākramapāṇḍiya. Rājaratnākāraya: Omits mention of him entirely.

== See also ==
- Chola conquest of Anuradhapura
- List of Sri Lankan monarchs

Parakrama Pandu (Sinhalese king) Died: 1048
Regnal titles
Preceded by Jagatīpāla	King of Anuradhapura; 1046–1048	Succeeded by Loka
