= Udaya II =

- King of Anuradhapura
- Reign: 887 - 898
- Predecessor: Sena II
- Successor: Kassapa IV
- Dynasty: House of Lambakanna II
- Father: Adipada MahindaSena

Udaya II was King of Anuradhapura from 887 to 898. He succeeded his older brother Sena II as King of Anuradhapura and was succeeded by his younger brother Kassapa IV. He was the son of Adipada Kassapa

== See also ==
- List of Sri Lankan monarchs
- History of Sri Lanka

Udaya II House of Lambakanna II Born: ? ? Died: ? ?
Regnal titles
Preceded by Dappula V	King of Anuradhapura; 952–955	Succeeded by Sena III
