= Kassapa VI =

King of Anuradhapura-in-exile from 1029 to 1040

King of Anuradhapura-in-exile
- Reign: 1029–1040
- Predecessor: Mahinda V
- Successor: Kitti
- Died: 1040
- Father: Mahinda V

Sri Lankan Monarchs during the Chola occupation (993–1070)
- 1. Mahinda V (982–1029); 2. Kassapa VI (1029–1040); 3. Kitti (1040); 4. Mahālāna-Kitti (1040–1042); 5. Vikkama Pandu (1042–1043); 6. Jagatīpāla (1043–1046); 7. Parakrama Pandu (1046–1048); 8. Loka (1048–1054); 9. Kassapa VII (1054–1055); 10. Vijayabahu I (1055–1110)

Kassapa VI (d. 1040) also known as Vikramabahu before his coronation was King of Anuradhapura-in-exile. Following the death of his father in 1029, Vikramabahu led the resistance movement against the Chola invaders of the country, ruling from the southern principality of Ruhuna from 1029 to 1041. He spent a number of years building up his forces to drive out the Chola, but the Chola inscriptions affirm that Vikkamabāhu lost his life in the Chola war and that his diadem fell into the hands of Räjädhirāja. The Mahavamsa, however, says that he suddenly died of a disease in the twelíth year of his reign (1041 A. D.) in the midst of extensive preparations for a Chola war.

== Emergence ==
Following the Chola invasion of Sri Lanka in 993 by Rajaraja I, they eventually consolidated their occupation of Rajarata (northern Sri Lanka). However they let the Sri Lankan king Mahinda V rule the southern region of Rohana unhindered for twenty four years. In 1017 they launched an invasion into Rohana and annexed the entire island as province of Chola Empire and captured the king, along with his queen and all the royal jewels, Mahinda V remained a prisoner of the Chola empire, and died under their captivity in 1029.

As long as their king was in custody, the Sinhalese in Sri Lanka submitted to the rule of the Chola empire. However resistance to Chola rule began almost immediately following the death of Mahinda V in 1029. As soon as news of his death reached the country, an increasing rebellion began in the south of the island, especially in the Ruhuna principality.

The prince Kassapa, son of Mahinda V, had hid in Rohana when his parents were captured by the Chola army, and was brought up in secret in the south. He was around twelve years old when he inherited the Sinhalse kingdom upon his father’s death. The Chola were eager to capture him, and they dispatched a large force from their capital of Polonnaruwa to seize the prince.

== Resistance to the Cholas ==
Approximate extent of Chola empire when Vikramabahu became king

The Chola force traveled the whole of Ruhuna to find Kassapa, but he was successfully protected by his adherents. As the Chola were looking for the prince, two Sinhalese generals launched attacks against the Chola, and forced them to retreat back to Polonnaruwa after six months of warfare. Thereafter Kassapa assumed sovereignty over Sri Lanka under the name of Vikramabahu, but he only had factual control over the Ruhuna principality.

Vikramabahu proceeded to build loyalty and adherence to himself, and began to acquire military resources for a drawn out defensive conflict with the Chola. Initially the Chola weren’t particularly concerned with stamping out the resistance organized by Vikramabahu, although they did carry out occasional raids into Ruhuna.

Around the same time in south India, resistance to the Chola was increasing in the conquered kingdoms of Pandya and Kerala. It is possible that the 3 conquered kingdoms, Sri Lanka, Pandya and Kerala were in contact with each other. Vikramabahu's preparations for battle were protracted, and it wasn’t until at least eight years later that he was ready for battle. But the Cola inscriptions affirm that Vikkamabāhu lost his life in the Cola war and that his diadem fell into the hands of Räjädhirāja. The year of his death has been placed between 1037 and 1041 by historians.

== Successors ==
Vikramabahu had no direct heirs to the throne, and ten years of internal disorganization and disunity followed his death. The Chola empire took advantage of the situation, putting three of the next five princes who assumed the throne to death.

Immediately after Vikramabahu's death, his senapati (army commander) Kitti assumed power. Kitti was deposed after eight days by Chief Secretary Mahālāna-Kitti, of whom little is known. Mahalanakitti ruled for a further three years but fell in battle with the Chola. He was succeeded by a number of Indian princes as the Sinhalese were willing to follow anyone who would lead them to freedom from the Chola empire. However successive rulers left Ruhuna much worse off than before, as they all are failed to defeat the Cholas.

Eventually in 1055, Vijayabahu I was proclaimed king, and following a seventeen-year-long campaign he successfully drove the Chola out of Sri Lanka, reuniting the country for the first time in over a century.

== See also ==
- Mahāvaṃsa
- List of Sri Lankan monarchs
- History of Sri Lanka
- Kingdom of Polonnaruwa

Kassapa VI House of Lambakanna II Died: 1040
Regnal titles
Preceded by Mahinda V	King of Anuradhapura; 1029–1040	Succeeded by Kitti
