= Panakaduwa copper plate =

Panakaduwa Copper Plate indited by Vijayabahu I

Panakaduwa copper plate is a Sri Lankan copper plate made at the request of King Vijayabahu I for a high-ranking general called Budalna (Sithnarubim Buddhanayake (Budalnavan), Dandanayake of Ruhuna). The plate was made in gratitude for the aid that Budalna gave to juvenile prince Kirthi (Vijayabahu I) and his family during his pre-regnal days from the Cholas. The king had triumphed over the Chola ruler and secured his kingdom. It was apparently completed around 1082-83 in the 27th year of his reign. This copper plate can be considered as the world's oldest thank you note in the recorded history.

== Discovery ==
It was found in a paddy field owned by a farmer living in Bogahadeniya called Suravirage Carolis Appohamy in February 1948. While the man was razing the turf for a paddy field, he encountered something glittering under the soil. He picked it up and found a piece of the copper plate. He took that home. As time went on, his family contracted disease which in turn made the man believe that the copper plate was the cause. He then took it to Vanarathana Thero of the Urapola Siri Rathanajothi Pirivena. Knowing its significance, he informed the Archaeological Officer of Polonnaruwa, Sarath Wattala who in turn informed Prof. Senerath Paranavitana and procured it for him. Paranavitana translated and disclosed its meaning to Sri Lankan history.

== Content ==
According to Senerath Paranavithana, this copper plate was rendered by Vijayabahu I to fulfill his obligations towards Budalna. According to the plate, the king had spared him and his descendants from the consequences of any wrongdoings they might commit or had committed.

At the time we were remaining concealed in the mountainous wilderness, having been deprived of our own kingdom in consequence to the calamity caused by the Soli Tamils, Lord Budal of Sitnaru-bim, Constable of Ruhuna, with the aid of his routine, protected the entire royal family, including our father His Majesty King Mugalan, the Great Lord; (he) brought us up in our tender age…

And orders that Lord Budal and his descendants be exempted from all forms of punishment.

with regard to the sons and grandsons of this (Lord) in the manner as it has come down from his lineage even if (they) were to commit an offence for which fines of imposts should be levied, beyond a reprimand administered by word (of mouth) after having settled the offence, no fines or imposts should be levied…should there even be an offence (committed by them) which cannot be expiated otherwise than by giving up life, (they) should be pardoned upon three times; (their) shares (of land holdings) and estates should not be confiscated…

According to Paranavitana, “After the royal order was delivered, its contents were embodied in formal phraseology which repeats the substance of the King’s words…a full month seems to have elapsed between the delivery of the order and the grant of the documents embodying it.”

== Description ==
The indenture is inscribed in three copper plates measuring 1 ft. and 2.5 inches in length and 3 inches in breadth. The plates were pinched in a peculiar way so as to allow a string to pass through its edges. Seven inscriptions appear on each side of the plates.
