= Kassapa V =

Kassapa V පස්වන කස්සප
- Pillar inscription of King Kassapa V

King of Anuradhapura
- Reign: 929–939
- Predecessor: Kassapa IV
- Successor: Dappula IV
- Issue: Dappula IV; Dappula V Sena IV
- Dynasty: House of Lambakanna II
- Father: Sena II
- Religion: Theravada Buddhism

Kassapa V (Sinhala: පස්වන කස්සප), was King of Anuradhapura in the 10th century, whose reign lasted from 929 to 939. He was also known as "Debisechcha Abasalamewan Kasup". And also he knew "Abhidharma" well. "Dampiya Atuwa Gatapadaya" and "dhamma sangani" were written by him. He succeeded his uncle Kassapa IV as King of Anuradhapura and was succeeded by his son Dappula IV.

== See also ==
- List of Sri Lankan monarchs
- History of Sri Lanka

Kassapa V House of Lambakanna II Born: ? ? Died: ? ?
Regnal titles
Preceded by Kassapa IV	King of Anuradhapura; 929–939	Succeeded by Dappula IV
