= Dappula V =

- King of Anuradhapura
- Reign: 940 – 952
- Predecessor: Dappula IV
- Successor: Udaya II
- Dynasty: House of Lambakanna II
- Father: Kassapa V

Dappula V was King of Anuradhapura in the 10th century, whose reign lasted from 940 to 952. He succeeded his brother Dappula IV as King of Anuradhapura and was succeeded by Udaya II.

== See also ==
- List of Sri Lankan monarchs
- History of Sri Lanka

Dappula V House of Lambakanna II Born: ? ? Died: ? ?
Regnal titles
Preceded by Dappula IV	King of Anuradhapura; 940–952	Succeeded by Udaya II
