= Dappula IV =

- King of Anuradhapura
- Reign: 939 – 940
- Predecessor: Kassapa V
- Successor: Dappula V
- Dynasty: House of Lambakanna II
- Father: Kassapa V

Dappula IV was King of Anuradhapura in the 10th century, whose reign lasted from 939 to 940. He succeeded his father Kassapa V as King of Anuradhapura and was succeeded by his brother Dappula V.

== See also ==
- List of Sri Lankan monarchs
- History of Sri Lanka

Dappula IV House of Lambakanna II Born: ? ? Died: ? ?
Regnal titles
Preceded by Kassapa V	King of Anuradhapura; 939–940	Succeeded by Dappula V
