= Aggabodhi VIII =

- King of Anuradhapura
- Reign: 816 – 827
- Predecessor: Mahinda III
- Successor: Dappula III
- Dynasty: House of Lambakanna II
- Father: Dappula II

Aggabodhi VIII was King of Anuradhapura in the 9th century, whose reign lasted from 816 to 827. He succeeded his brother Mahinda III as King of Anuradhapura and was succeeded by his brother Dappula III.

== See also ==
- List of Sri Lankan monarchs
- History of Sri Lanka

Aggabodhi VIII House of Lambakanna II Born: ? ? Died: ? ?
Regnal titles
Preceded by Mahinda III	King of Anuradhapura; 816–827	Succeeded by Dappula III
