= Aggabodhi VII =

- King of Anuradhapura
- Reign: 781 – 787
- Predecessor: Aggabodhi VI
- Successor: Mahinda II
- Dynasty: House of Lambakanna II

Aggabodhi VII was King of Anuradhapura in the 8th century, whose reign lasted from 781 to 787. He succeeded his cousin Aggabodhi VI as King of Anuradhapura and was succeeded by Mahinda II. His father was King Mahinda I.

Aggabodhi was appointed as the Adipada of Ruhuna by his father. His cousin Aggabodhi (the son of King Kassapa III) was the sub king (yuva raja) and was administering the east of the country. On Mahinda I's death, prince Aggabodhi was in the capital. The administration of the kingdom fell into his hands. However, he invited the sub-king Aggabodhi to become king and crowned him as King Silamegha (Aggabodhi VI). Prince Aggabodhi himself was appointed the sub-king and looked after the administration of the whole country.

Those who were not favoured by the sub-king managed to poison Silamegha (Aggabodhi VI) mind against him. In response, sub-king Aggabodhi escaped to Ruhuna where he collected a huge army. He waged a civil war before suffering a crushing defeat at Kadalinivatha. He escaped the battle and hid himself in the Malaya Rata (hill country).

Before long, King Silamegha realised that he had been wrong to turn against sub-king Aggabodhi and he went alone to Malaya Rata, met with Prince Aggabodhi and effected a peace between them. Aggabodhi was invited back to the capital and King's daughter, Sangha, was given to the sub-king in marriage. However, the marriage did not seem to a happy one as Sangha forsook her husband and entered a convent. From there she ran away with her cousin, Dappula. The sub king Aggabodhi waged war against Dappula with the help of the King and recovered his wife. They reconciled their differences and lived a contented life.

Aggabodhi ascended the throne as King Aggabodhi VII on the death of King Silamegha (Aggabodhi VI). He was well advanced in years when he ascended the throne. He devoted the six years of his reign for furthering Buddhism. He repaired and strengthened the image house at the Sri Maha Bodhi tree. He also built two viharas - Kollanda and Molla Vaataka. He cleansed the order of bhikkus by issuing decrees. He also prescribed the manner of holding festivities and funerals. He further issued ticket rice (Salaka dana) to the three chapters of sangha Maha Vihara, Abhayagiri and Jethavana - Theriya, Dhammaruchi and Sagali sects.

He died in the sixth year of his reign and was succeeded by his nephew, Mahinda II (Son of Silamegha).

== See also ==
- List of Sri Lankan monarchs
- History of Sri Lanka

Aggabodhi VII House of Lambakanna II Born: ? ? Died: 787
Regnal titles
Preceded by Aggabodhi VI	King of Anuradhapura; 781–787	Succeeded by Mahinda II
