= Dappula III =

- King of Anuradhapura
- Reign: 827 – 843 CE
- Predecessor: Aggabodhi VIII
- Successor: Aggabodhi IX
- Issue: Aggabodhi IX; Sena I
- Dynasty: House of Lambakanna II
- Father: Dappula II

Dappula III was King of Anuradhapura in the 9th century CE, whose reign lasted from 827 to 843 CE. He succeeded his brother Aggabodhi VIII as King of Anuradhapura and was succeeded by his son Aggabodhi IX.

== See also ==
- List of Sri Lankan monarchs
- History of Sri Lanka

Dappula III House of Lambakanna II Born: ? ? Died: ? ?
Regnal titles
Preceded by Aggabodhi VIII	King of Anuradhapura; 827–843	Succeeded by Aggabodhi IX
