= Sena III =

- King of Anuradhapura
- Welmilla pillar inscription of king Sena III
- Reign: 955–964
- Predecessor: Udaya II
- Successor: Udaya III
- Dynasty: House of Lambakanna II
- Father: Adipada Mahinda

Sena III was King of Anuradhapura in the 10th century, whose reign lasted from 955 to 964. He succeeded his brother Udaya II as King of Anuradhapura and was succeeded by Udaya III.

== See also ==
- List of Sri Lankan monarchs
- History of Sri Lanka

Sena III House of Lambakanna II Born: ? ? Died: ? ?
Regnal titles
Preceded by Udaya II	King of Anuradhapura; 955–964	Succeeded by Udaya III
