= Aggabodhi IX =

- King of Anuradhapura
- Reign: 843 – 846
- Predecessor: Dappula III
- Successor: Sena I
- Dynasty: House of Lambakanna II
- Father: Dappula III

Aggabodhi IX was King of Anuradhapura in the 9th century, whose reign lasted from 843 to 846. He succeeded his father Dappula III as King of Anuradhapura and was succeeded by his brother Sena I.

== See also ==
- List of Sri Lankan monarchs
- History of Sri Lanka

Aggabodhi IX House of Lambakanna II Born: ? ? Died: ? ?
Regnal titles
Preceded by Dappula III	King of Anuradhapura; 843–846	Succeeded by Sena I
