= Mahinda I =

- King of Anuradhapura
- Reign: 738 – 741
- Predecessor: Kassapa III
- Successor: Aggabodhi VI
- Issue: Aggabodhi VII
- Dynasty: House of Lambakanna II
- Father: Manavanna

Mahinda I, known colloquially as Midel, was King of Anuradhapura in the 8th century, whose reign lasted from 738 to 741. He succeeded his brother Kassapa III as King of Anuradhapura and was succeeded by his nephew Aggabodhi VI.

Royal sources describe him as a humble and sentimental person who refused to wear the crown due to his grief on the death of his friend and possible lover, Nīla, with whom he had a very intimate relationship. Subsequently after his death, the king duly discharged his kingly duties but gave up pleasures of the kingly office.

He governed the country under the title of Adipada (Governor). He raised prince Aggabodhi (the son of his brother Kassapa III) to the office of Yuva Raja (Sub-King) . The Yuva Raja was entrusted with the administration of the eastern part of the country. His own son was entrusted with the administration of Ruhuna (Rohana District).

He caused to give 10 cartloads of alms at Mahapali Dana Sala (Alms Hall). He built a vihara (temple) and a Meheni Aramaya (Convent for Bhikkunis) and endowed it with the income of two villages.

He died in the third year of his reign. His nephew, Yuva Raja prince Aggabodhi, was in the capital at the time of his death and succeeded Mahinda as King Aggabodhi VI.

== See also ==
- List of Sri Lankan monarchs
- History of Sri Lanka
- Kassapa III
- Hephaestion (a boyhood friend of Alexander the Great who had a similar intimate relationship with him like Nila)

Mahinda I House of Lambakanna II Born: ? ? Died: 741
Regnal titles
Preceded by Kassapa III	King of Anuradhapura; 738–741	Succeeded by Aggabodhi VI
