= Aggabodhi VI =

Aggabodhi VI 6 වන අග්ගබෝධි
- King of Anuradhapura
- Reign: 741 – 781
- Predecessor: Mahinda I
- Successor: Aggabodhi VII
- Issue: Mahinda II
- Dynasty: House of Lambakanna II
- Father: Kassapa III
- Religion: Theravada Buddhism

Aggabodhi VI (Sinhala: හය වන අග්ගබෝධි, [ɦajə ʋənə aggəboːdi]) was King of Anuradhapura in the 8th century, whose reign lasted from 741 to 781. He succeeded his uncle Mahinda I as King of Anuradhapura and was succeeded by his cousin Aggabodhi VII.

He took the regnal name of Silamegha and appointed his cousin Aggabodhi (son of King Mahinda I) as the yuva raja. The yuvaraja was instrumental in eliminating the lawlessness prevailing in the country. The corrupt officials who suffered from this able administration gained the King Silamegha's ears by telling him that he was the king in name only while the administration of the country was by prince Aggabodhi (yuva raja).

The yuva raja detecting this change of heart from the king fled to Ruhuna and collected a large army where he initiated a civil war. He was defeated at Kadalinivatha and the former yuva raja became a fugitive in the hill country (Malaya Rata).

King Silamegha was a good man and he remembered the good things done by prince Aggabodhi. The king set out unattended to Malaya district. A reconciliation was effected. Prince Aggabodhi became yuva raja again. This time, the King's daughter Sangha was given in marriage to him.

During the King Silamegha's time, the renown of the expertise and the excellence of the Sinhalese engineers in irrigation tank building has spread far and wide and King Djaya-pida of Kashmir has asked for their service in A.C. 745 (Rajatharangani-a history of Kashmir).

Embassies were sent to Tang dynasty in 742 A.C., 746 A.C., 750 A.C. and the last in 762 A.C. during King Silamegha's reign. (Chinese chronicle Tshi-foo Yuen-kwei). Pearls, golden flowers, precious stones, ivory and pieces of fine cotton clothes were sent as gifts to the Chinese emperor in the embassy of 742 A.C. by King "Chi-lo-me-kia" Silamegha) according to the chronicle. A Brahmin was the ambassador of the 746 A.C. embassy to the Tang court, carrying head ornaments of gold, precious neck pendants, forty webs of fine cotton cloths and the "Maha Parinibbana Sutra" of Buddhism.

King Silamegha died in the fortieth year of his reign. During his reign extensive repairs were carried out in Abhayagiri Vihara and at Thuparamaya. The stone pillars of Thuparamaya were set in a different order and repairs were carried out at four other viharas.

== See also ==
- List of Sri Lankan monarchs
- History of Sri Lanka

Aggabodhi VI House of Lambakanna II Born: ? ? Died: 781
Regnal titles
Preceded by Mahinda I	King of Anuradhapura; 741–781	Succeeded by Aggabodhi VII
