= Mahinda III =

- King of Anuradhapura
- Reign: 812 – 816
- Predecessor: Dappula II
- Successor: Aggabodhi VIII
- Dynasty: House of Lambakanna II
- Father: Dappula II

Mahinda III was King of Anuradhapura in the 9th century, whose reign lasted from 812 to 816. He succeeded his father Dappula II as King of Anuradhapura and was succeeded by his brother Aggabodhi VIII.

== See also ==
- List of Sri Lankan monarchs
- History of Sri Lanka

Mahinda III House of Lambakanna II Born: ? ? Died: ? ?
Regnal titles
Preceded by Dappula II	King of Anuradhapura; 812–816	Succeeded by Aggabodhi VIII
