= Dappula II =

- King of Anuradhapura
- Reign: 807 – 812
- Predecessor: Mahinda II
- Successor: Mahinda III
- Issue: Mahinda III; Aggabodhi VIII; Dappula III
- Dynasty: House of Lambakanna II
- Father: Mahinda II
- Religion: Theravada Buddhism

Dappula II was King of Anuradhapura in the 9th century, whose reign lasted from 807 to 812. He succeeded his father Mahinda II as King of Anuradhapura and was succeeded by his son Mahinda III.

There was a revolt at the commencement of his reign by the chieftains of the north east of the island. His eldest son was sent with an army to subdue the rebels. The King was waiting near Minneriya when he received the news that both the prince and his general (Senapathi) had joined the rebels. The king proceeded to Duratissa with the main army and defeated the rebels. The rebels including the renegade prince and the general were slain with the rebel leaders. For the remainder of his reign, the King resided at Polonnaruwa.

There was a chieftain named Dhatasiva (Datopatissa) raising the flag of rebellion in Rohana. His son Mahinda ran away from the father and arrived at the King Dappula II court seeking his help against the father. The King was impressed with the young man and gave his Daughter Daeva in marriage.

== See also ==
- List of Sri Lankan monarchs
- History of Sri Lanka

Dappula II House of Lambakanna II Born: ? ? Died: 812
Regnal titles
Preceded by Mahinda II	King of Anuradhapura; 807–812	Succeeded by Mahinda III
