= Sena V =

- King of Anuradhapura
- Reign: 991 – 1001
- Predecessor: Mahinda IV
- Successor: Mahinda V
- Dynasty: House of Lambakanna II
- Father: Mahinda IV

Sena V was King of Anuradhapura in the 10th century, whose reign lasted from 991 to 1001. He succeeded his father Mahinda IV as King of Anuradhapura and was succeeded by his brother Mahinda V.

== See also ==
- List of Sri Lankan monarchs
- History of Sri Lanka

Sena V House of Lambakanna II Born: ? ? Died: ? ?
Regnal titles
Preceded by Mahinda IV	King of Anuradhapura; 991–1001	Succeeded by Mahinda V
