= Thihoshin Pagoda =

Notable Buddhist Pagoda in Pakokku, Myanmar

- သီဟိုဠ်ရှင်မြတ်စွာဘုရား
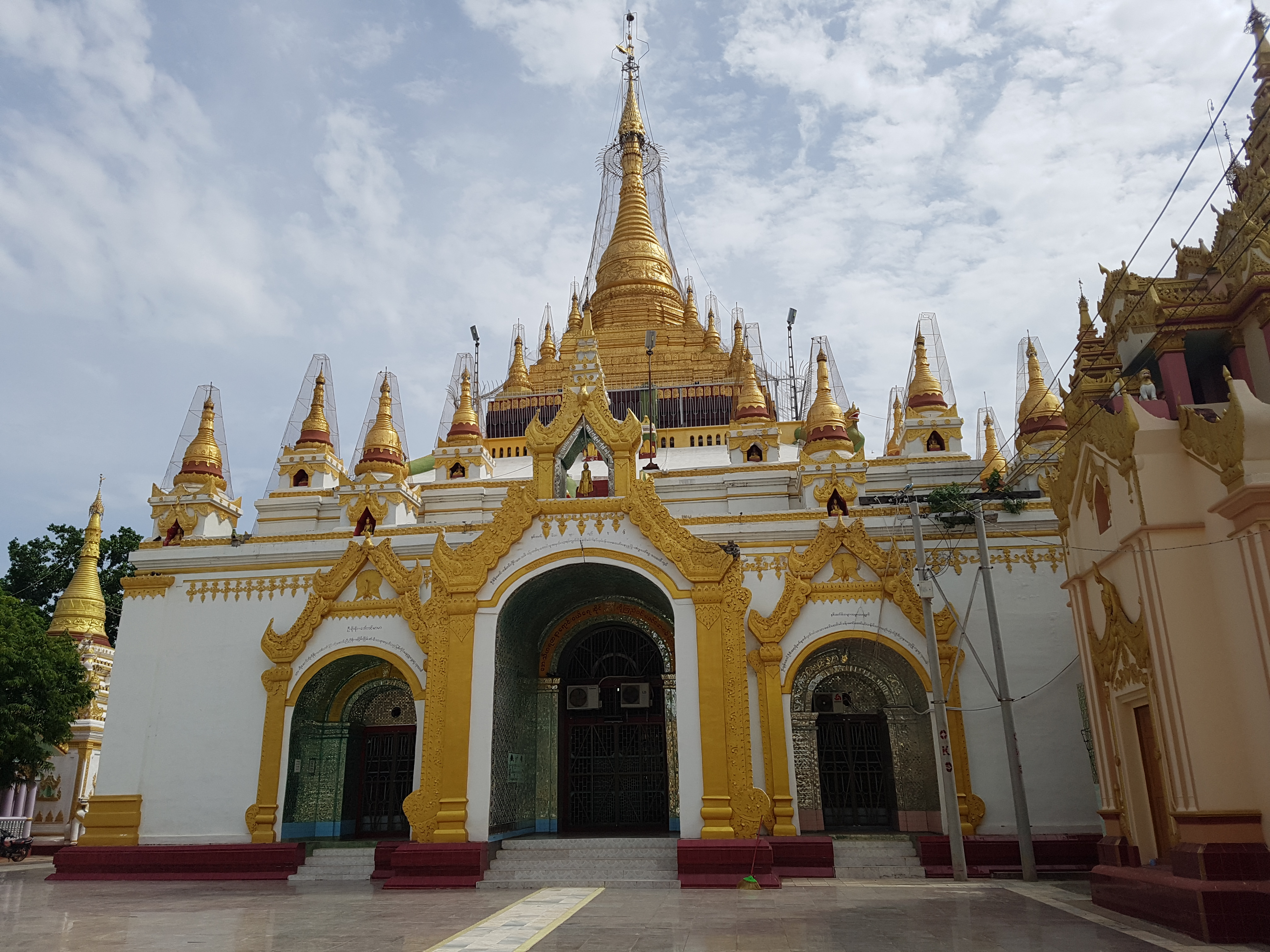
- Thihoshin Pagoda

Religion
- Affiliation: Theravada Buddhism

Location
- Location: Pakokku, Magway Region
- Country: Myanmar
- Interactive map of Thihoshin Pagoda
- Coordinates: 21.326932°N 95.06765°E

Architecture
- Founder: King Vijayabahu I (Ashoka Rama), King of Sri Lanka
- Completed: King Alaungsithu

Thihoshin Pagoda (Burmese: သီဟိုဠ်ရှင်စေတီ) is a famous Buddhist pagoda in Pakokku, Magway Region, Myanmar. The pagoda was initiated and offered by Vijayabahu I (Ashoka Rama), the king of Sri Lanka, who reigned from 1070 to 1110. It was completed during the reign of King Alaungsithu (1090–1167). A pagoda festival is held every year between May and June, from the 8th to 10th waxing days of the Burmese month of Nayon.
