= Mahinda V =

King of Anuradhapura
- Reign: 982–1017
- Predecessor: Sena V
- Successor: Rajaraja I

King of Anuradhapura-in-exile
- Reign: 1017–1029
- Successor: Kassapa VI
- Died: 1029
- Issue: Kassapa VI
- Father: Mahinda IV

Sri Lankan Monarchs during the Chola occupation (993–1070)
- 1. Mahinda V (982–1029); 2. Kassapa VI (1029–1040); 3. Kitti (1040); 4. Mahālāna-Kitti (1040–1042); 5. Vikkama Pandu (1042–1043); 6. Jagatīpāla (1043–1046); 7. Parakrama Pandu (1046–1048); 8. Loka (1048–1054); 9. Kassapa VII (1054–1055); 10. Vijayabahu I (1055–1110)

Mahinda V (d. 1029) was King of Anuradhapura in the 11th century. He was the last king of the Anuradhapura Kingdom as well as from the House of Lambakanna II. In 993, he fled to Ruhuna, the southern part of the country, following a large scale mutiny by his army. A Chola invasion led by Rajaraja Chola I captured Anuradhapura taking advantage of the 11 year civil war and subsequent turmoil that happened after Anuradhapura fell into anarchy. He was later taken prisoner and taken to India, where he died as a prisoner in 1029. The Mahavamsa records that the rule of Mahinda V was weak and he was unable to even organize the collecting of taxes. The country was in a state of extreme poverty and his army refused to follow orders due to lack of wages.

== See also ==
- List of Sri Lankan monarchs

== Sources ==
- Spencer, George W. (1976). "The Politics of Plunder: The Cholas in Eleventh-Century Ceylon". The Journal of Asian Studies. 35 (3): 405–419. doi:10.2307/2053272.

Mahinda V House of Lambakanna II Born: ? ? Died: ? 1029
Regnal titles
Preceded by Sena V	King of Anuradhapura; 982–1017	Succeeded by Rajaraja Chola I Vikramabahu
