= Udaya III =

- King of Anuradhapura
- Reign: 964 – 972
- Predecessor: Sena III
- Successor: Sena IV
- Dynasty: House of Lambakanna II

Udaya III was King of Anuradhapura in the 10th century, whose reign lasted from 964 to 972. He succeeded Sena III as King of Anuradhapura and was succeeded by Sena IV.

== See also ==
- List of Sri Lankan monarchs
- History of Sri Lanka

Udaya III House of Lambakanna II Born: ? ? Died: ? ?
Regnal titles
Preceded by Sena III	King of Anuradhapura; 964–972	Succeeded by Sena IV
