= Sena IV =

- King of Anuradhapura
- Reign: 972 – 975
- Predecessor: Udaya III
- Successor: Mahinda IV
- Dynasty: House of Lambakanna II

Sena IV was King of Anuradhapura in the 10th century, whose reign lasted from 972 to 975. He succeeded Udaya III as King of Anuradhapura and was succeeded by his brother Mahinda IV.

== See also ==
- List of Sri Lankan monarchs
- History of Sri Lanka

Sena IV House of Lambakanna II Born: ? ? Died: ? ?
Regnal titles
Preceded by Udaya III	King of Anuradhapura; 972–975	Succeeded by Mahinda IV
