= Kassapa IV =

- King of Anuradhapura
- Pillar inscription of King Kassapa IV, National Museum of Colombo
- Reign: 912–929
- Predecessor: Udaya I
- Successor: Kassapa V
- Dynasty: House of Lambakanna II
- Father: Adipada Kassapa

Kassapa IV was King of Anuradhapura in the 10th century, whose reign lasted from 912 to 929. He succeeded his brother Udaya I as King of Anuradhapura and was succeeded by his nephew Kassapa V.

== See also ==
- List of Sri Lankan monarchs
- History of Sri Lanka

Kassapa IV House of Lambakanna II Born: ? ? Died: ? ?
Regnal titles
Preceded by Udaya I	King of Anuradhapura; 912–929	Succeeded by Kassapa V
