= Malaya Rata =

Region of Sri Lanka

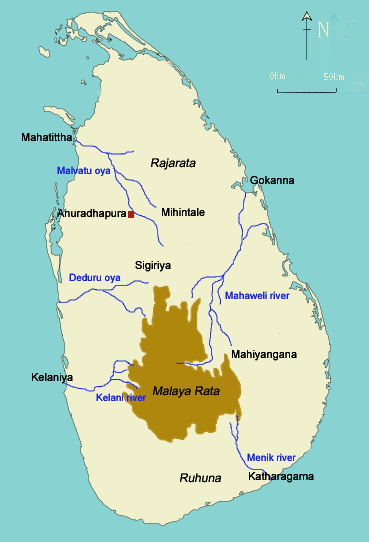
Malaya Rata

Malaya Rata, also called the Sri Lankan Upcountry or Sri Lankan Up-Country is the mountainous areas of central Sri Lanka.

It is also one of the three historical regions of the island of Sri Lanka alongside Rajarata and Ruhunu Rata. Malaya Rata was historically known to house the natives tribes; Yaksha, Raksha, and to a certain extent the Naga. Numerous kingdoms based in Sri Lanka ruled over this area alongside the rest of Sri Lanka. The most notable of which was the Kandyan Kingdom, which consistently controlled most or all of Malaya Rata throughout its 346 years of existence from 1469 to 1815, and had its capital Kandy situated roughly in the center of Malaya Rata.

== See also ==
- Provinces of Sri Lanka
- History of Sri Lanka
