= Vijayabahu I =

King of Polonnaruwa from 1055 to 1110

Vijayabahu I මහා විජයබාහු
- Siri Sangha Bo; Sinhaladheeshvara Chakravarthi
- Obverse coin of Vijayabahu I (left); Reverse coin of Vijayabahu I (right)

King of Anuradhapura-in-exile
- Reign: 1055-1070
- Predecessor: Kassapa VII

King of Polonnaruwa
- Reign: 1070-1110
- Coronation: 1072/73
- Successor: Jayabahu I
- Born: Keerthi; 1039; Rohana
- Died: 1110 (aged 71); Polonnaruwa, Kingdom of Polonnaruwa
- Consort: Līlāvatī of Kannauj; Tilokasundarī of Kalinga
- Issue: Vikramabahu I
- House: House of Vijayabahu
- Father: Mahāsāmi Moggallāna of Ruhuna
- Mother: Lokitā Devi

Vijayabahu I (Sinhala: මහා විජයබාහු) (1039–1110), also known as Vijayabahu the Great, was the Sinhalese king from 1055 to 1110. Vijayabahu reigned as King of Polonnaruwa from 1070 to 1110, and as the King of Anuradhapura-in-exile before that from 1055 to 1070. Born to a royal bloodline, Prince Kitti grew up under Chola occupation, being the legitimate heir to the Sinhalese throne he assumed leadership of the Sinhalese resistance centered in the southern region of Sri Lanka known as Rohana in 1055. Following a seventeen-year-long campaign, he successfully drove the Cholas out of the island in 1070, reuniting the country for the first time in over 77 years. During his reign, he re-established Buddhism in Sri Lanka and repaired much of the damage caused to infrastructure during the wars. He offered the Thihoshin Pagoda (Lord of Sri Lanka Buddha image) to Burmese king Alaungsithu which still stands in Pakokku.

== Early life ==
Prince Keerthi was born around 1039 in Rohana while the country was under Chola occupation. As a result, there were When he was fifteen years old Kitti defeated the last of such rulers, Lokissara, with the aim of becoming the king of Rohana. Subsequently, in 1055, he became king of Rohana and attained the name of Vijayabahu.

According to the Panakaduwa copper inscription (Panakaduwa inscription which written on copper sheets about the gifts, offerings and given by King Vijayabahu I to his higher military officer) King Vijayabahu I's own words says that Prince Kiththi and King Moggallana's whole family was under the protection of Rohana Dandanayaka Sitnaru-bim Budalnavan and he provided a great support to the king to make the country under the same flag.

The Chola army frequently attacked Vijayabahu's troops in Rohana. However, he managed to free Rohana from the Cholas by 1058 and take it under his complete control.

== War against the Cholas ==
Sri Lankan Monarchs during the Chola occupation (993–1070)
- 1. Mahinda V (982–1029); 2. Kassapa VI (1029–1040); 3. Kitti (1040); 4. Mahālāna-Kitti (1040–1042); 5. Vikkama Pandu (1042–1043); 6. Jagatīpāla (1043–1046); 7. Parakrama Pandu (1046–1048); 8. Loka (1048–1054); 9. Kassapa VII (1054–1055); 10. Vijayabahu I (1055–1110)

In the 11th century, the Chola Empire of Southern India reached its imperial state. Emperor Rajaraja I invaded and annexed the Kingdom of Anuradhapura in 992, while his son Rajendra invaded Rohana in 1017, capturing king Mahinda V. The Rohana kingdom became a part of the Cholas while Kassapa VI, the son of Mahinda ascended the throne.

=== First battle of Polonnaruwa ===
After securing Rohana, his intention was to capture Polonnaruwa, the capital of the country. In 1066, he launched the first attack on Polonnaruwa, and captured and held the city for a brief time. However, after receiving reinforcements from South India, the strengthened Chola army attacked again and defeated Vijaybahu thus forcing Vijayabahu to retreat.

He established himself in Wakirigala after this and concentrated on organizing his army for a fresh attempt to capture Polonnaruwa. During this time, he also had to face rebellions from other Sinhala leaders fighting for the throne. Overcoming these rebellions, Vijayabahu continued to muster his armies in order to retake the Capital, but was not strong enough to attempt another attack against the Chola army. He made Katharagama in Rohana as his capital and also he started to organize an army to defeat the Cholas.

=== Second battle of Polonnaruwa ===
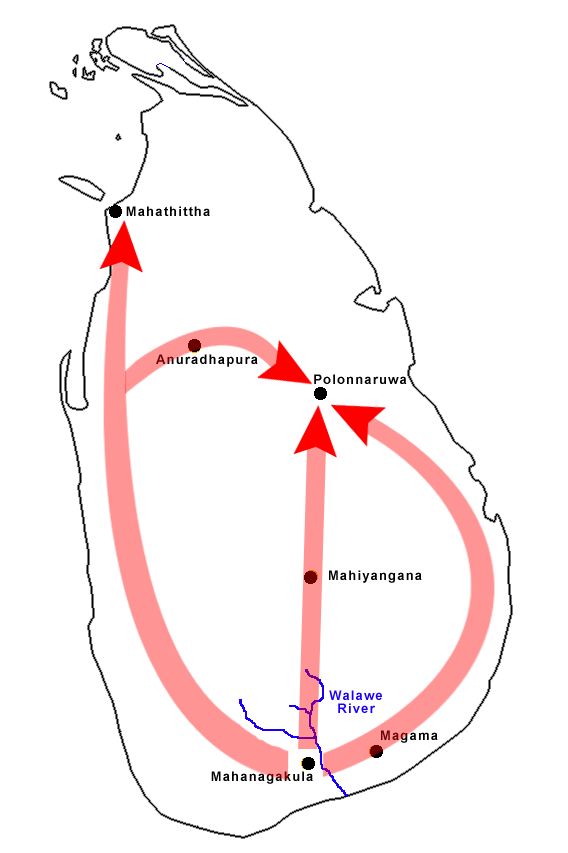
Vijayabahu I sent three armies to attack Polonnaruwa. One was sent along the western shore to Mahatittha and Polonnaruwa, another from the east across Magama and the third and main force across Mahiyanga.

Civil war broke out during 1069–1070 in the Chola Empire in South India, Tamil Nadu, throwing the country into turmoil. The concerns within Chola empire prevented the empire from focusing on Sri Lanka, providing an opportunity for Vijayabahu to attack again while the Chola forces in Polonnaruwa were more or less isolated. He had gained the support of many kingdoms to defeat the Cholas such as Burma and Pandya who also wanted to defeat the Cholas in their kingdom.

Starting from Mahanagakula to the south of the Walawe river, Vijayabahu dispatched three armies to attack Polonnaruwa from three fronts. One army was sent along the western shore of the country to Mahathittha port to deal with any reinforcements arriving from South India. Afterwards, part of this army moved towards Polonnaruwa and attacked from the North-west, while the other part held the ports to prevent reinforcements from arriving. A second army was sent from the east across Magama to attack Polonnaruwa from the east. The third and main force advanced across the country, led by the king. Surrounded by these three armies, Polonnaruwa was besieged for seven months.Then Cholas were forced to dispatch an expedition from mainland to recapture the settlements in Northern Ceylon and carry the attack back into Rohana. What had begun as the profitable incursion and the occupation was now deteriorating into desperate attempts to retain a foothold in the north. The occupation ended in Chola Withdrawal after the further series of indecisive clashes In 1070, Vijayabahu became the ruler of Polonnaruwa.

== Reign ==
After the victory at Polonnaruwa, Vijayabahu had to face more rebellions. This caused him to delay his coronation, which took place in 1072 or 1073, eighteen years after being crowned as Vijayabahu in Rohana and after a military campaign that lasted seventeen years. Polonnaruwa was renamed “Vijayaraja pura” and chosen as the capital, making Vijayabahu the first Sinhala king of the Polonnaruwa kingdom. The coronation ceremony was held in a palace built for this purpose in Anuradhapura, the former capital of the country. Vijayabahu took Lilavati, the daughter of Jagatipala of Ayodhya as his queen. Jagatipala was a prince from the North Indian city of Ayodhya, who had usurped the throne of Rohana from a Pandyan prince and ruled Rohana for 4 years in the chaos following Kassapa VI's death. Jagatipala was killed in a Chola invasion of Rohana.

He also married Tilokasundari, a princess from Kalinga, with the view of strengthening ties with the Kalingas. King Vijayabahu I had given his sister Mitta's hand in marriage to a Tamil Pandyan prince who assimilated to the Sinhalese royal family and that Pandyan prince would go on to become the father of Manabharana, who in turn was the father of Parakramabahu I.

During the Chola rule and the wars, Buddhism in the country had suffered a lot and Buddhist monks were few. Five ordained monks—necessary for the upasampada (ordination) of Buddhist monks—could not be found in the whole country. To re-establish Buddhism in the country, Vijayabahu sought help from King Anawrahta in Burma. As a result, ordained monks were sent from Burma to Sri Lanka. These monks helped to re-establish Buddhism by ordaining new monks and teaching the Pitaka. In addition to this, Vijayabahu also repaired several Buddhist temples that were abandoned and destroyed. A new temple was also constructed in Polonnaruwa for the keeping of the sacred tooth relic of the Buddha.The history says that the monks in both countries got together to make an acceptable version in the scriptures when some interpretations of the "Thripitaka" were different with each other.

Vijayabahu also reconstructed a number of tanks in Rajarata destroyed during the wars, in addition to constructing several new tanks. This reconstruction of the irrigation system in Rajarata area was important to the development of the country since the country depended mainly on paddy cultivation.

Around 1084/1085, another quarrel with the Chola kingdom erupted when some ambassadors of Vijayabahu sent to West Chalukya were harassed by them. However, the king's decision for another war against the Chola Empire caused the Velakkara mercenaries serving in Vijayabahu's army to rebel against him. Several generals of the army were killed by the mutineers and the royal palace was burned down. Vijayabahu fled to Wakirigala again but returned to Polonnaruwa and recaptured it, suppressing the rebellion. The rebel leaders were captured and executed.

Vijayabahu is also noted for constructing roads to Sri Pada and building resting places called ambalama for the benefit of the pilgrims. He also granted villages and cultivations for the service of the pilgrims and the shrine. This is recorded in the "Ambagamu" inscription which situated by the King Vijayabahu I.

During his period he restored the Kurundi Viharaya.

=== Death ===
Vijayabahu died in 1110, having reigned as king of Sri Lanka for fifty-five years. He was then known as “Mahalu Vijayabahu” (Vijayabahu the old) due to his age and long rule of the country. He is also commonly referred to as Maha Vijayabahu (Vijayabahu the great).

== Legacy ==
The Vijayabahu Infantry Regiment of the Sri Lanka Army is named after him.

== See also ==
- Mahavamsa
- List of monarchs of Sri Lanka
- History of Sri Lanka
- Vijayabahu Infantry Regiment

Vijayabahu I House of Vijayabahu Born: ? 1039 Died: ? 1110
Regnal titles
| Preceded by Kassapa VII | King of Polonnaruwa; 1055–1110 | Succeeded by Jayabâhu I |
