= Principality of Ruhuna =

Principality in present-day Sri Lanka

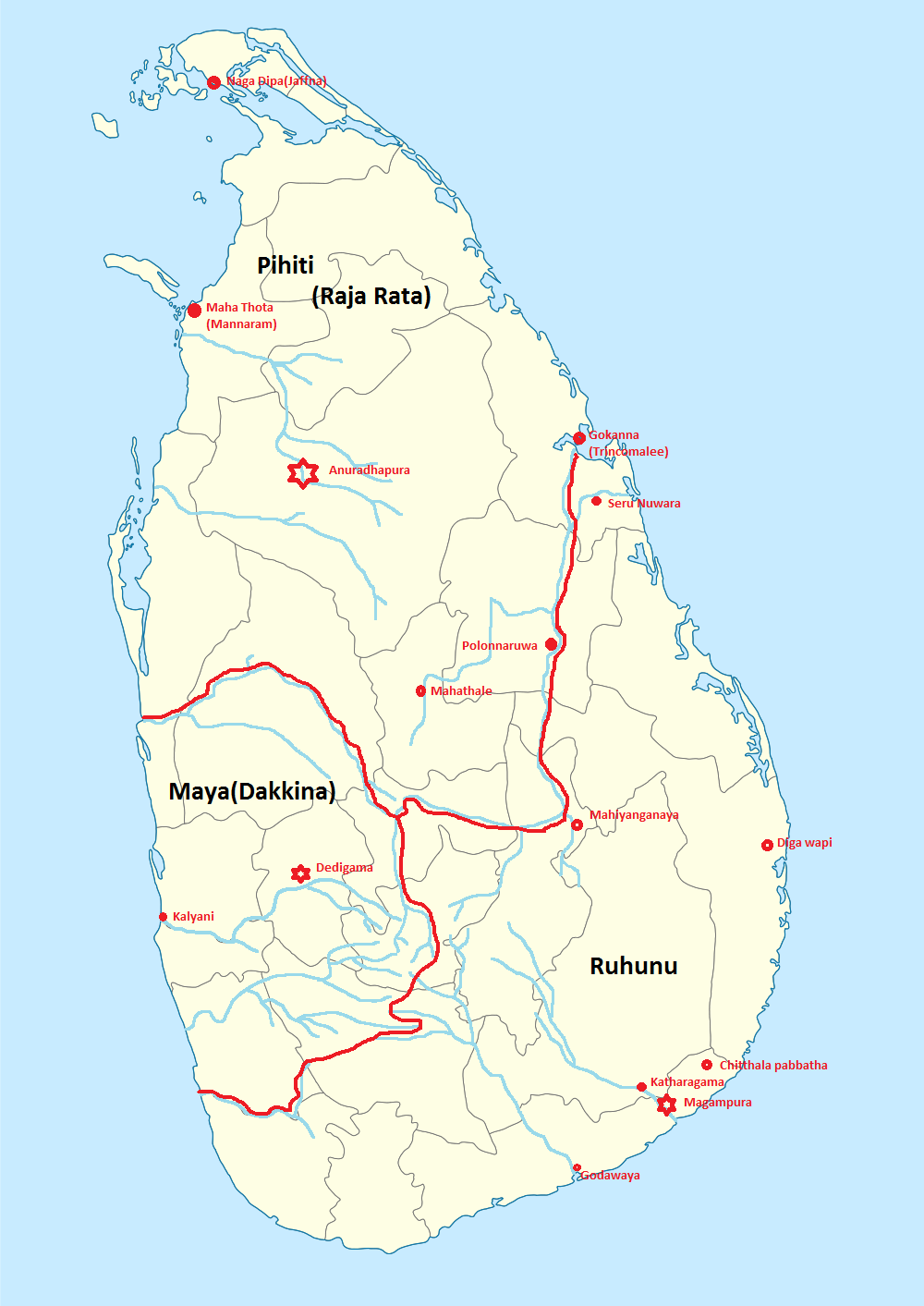
Three states of the ancient Sinhalese kingdom

The Principality of Ruhuna (Sinhala: රුහුණ, [ruɦuɳə]), also referred to as the Kingdom of Ruhuna, is a region of present-day Southern and Eastern Sri Lanka. It was the centre of a flourishing civilisation and the cultural and economic centres of ancient Sri Lanka. Magama, Tissamaharama and Mahanagakula (now called as Ambalantota) were established here.

The kingdom of Ruhuna was an important state in Sinhalese history as it was known for several rebellions against the superior states in Rajarata. The principality was defeated with its last de facto Queen Sugala been captured and executed by the invading army of Parakramabahu I. Following its annexing by Parakramabahu, the rebellions that arose were suppressed.

== Name ==
Following the arrival of Princess Buddhakachchana, six of her brothers came to Sri Lanka and settled in different parts of the island. One of the brothers, Rohana, settled in the area between Kumbukkan Oya and Deeghawapi. His settlement was named Rohana.

== History ==
=== Founding ===
According to the Pali chronicles, Ruhuna was founded around 200 BC by Prince Mahanaga, brother to Devanampiya Tissa of Anuradhapura, after a personal dispute. This region played a vital role in building the nation as well in the establishment of Buddhist culture.

=== Significance ===
The kings of Anuradhapura and the Chola kingdom during the reign over a majority of the country, generally fought against the forces of Ruhuna.

Notable Ruhunan militants include: Vijayabahu I, whose armies defeated several Chola generals; and Manabharana II, whose army once conquered Polonnaruwa. The resistances that arose from Ruhuna were generally victorious against the Rajarata kingdom.

=== Conquest ===
After Parakramabahu I conquered the kingdom of Rajarata, defeating its king Gajabahu II, he dispatched a force to Ruhuna. The people and army of Ruhuna generally opposed this and established a force against the invaders. While the Ruhunans were able to defeat a prominent general of Parakramabahu's army named Rakkha, they were defeated and their queen was executed.

== Area ==
The area identified with Ruhuna in ancient times is mainly the Southern Province, a large part of the Uva Province and small parts of Sabaragamuwa and Eastern Provinces.

== Princes of Ruhuna ==
Portrait	Name	Birth	Death	King from	King until	Relationship with predecessor(s)
	Mahanaga	-	-	?	?	Younger brother of Devanampiya Tissa
	Yatala Tissa	-	-	?	?	Son of Mahanaga
	Gothabhaya	-	-	?	205 BC	Son of Yatala Tissa
	Kavan Tissa	-	-	205 BC	161 BC	Son of Gothabhaya

== See also ==
- Provinces of Sri Lanka
- History of Sri Lanka
- University of Ruhuna
- Dhatusena
