= Upatissa II =

Upatissa II දෙවන උපතිස්ස
- King of Anuradhapura
- Reign: 517-518 (525 – 526)
- Predecessor: Siva II
- Successor: Silakala Ambosamanera
- Dynasty: House of Lambakanna

Upatissa II (Sinhala: දෙවන උපතිස්ස), (reigned c. 517 – 518 CE) was a monarch of the Anuradhapura Kingdom of Sri Lanka. He ascended the throne during a period of political instability following the death of King Kumara Dhatusena. His short reign of one and a half years was dominated by the internal power struggle against the nobleman Silakala, which ultimately led to the King's death and the end of his regime.

== Accession and Family ==
Upatissa II came to power by overthrowing King Siva II, the maternal uncle and assassin of the previous King, Kittisena. Upatissa II killed Siva and claimed the throne, thereby restoring the Lambakarna dynasty to power. He held a close connection to the previous royal lineage, being the husband of King Moggallana I's sister. At the time of his accession, Upatissa II was already an old man and had lost his sight, being described in the chronicles as "old and blind".

== Conflict with Silakala ==
During Upatissa's reign, his most significant rival was Silakala (also known as Amba Samanera), a powerful nobleman and the Sword-Bearer (Asiggaha) of the previous kings. Silakala believed that he had a stronger claim to the throne than Upatissa, who was merely the husband of Moggallana’s sister. Attempting to appease this powerful rival and secure his loyalty, King Upatissa II gave his own daughter in marriage to Silakala. However, this diplomatic marriage failed to curb Silakala's ambition.

== The Civil War ==
Silakala eventually launched an open rebellion. He retreated to the Southern Province (Dakshinadesa), raised a substantial army, and looted the countryside to fund his campaign before marching on the capital, Anuradhapura.

The Defense of the Capital:

Due to King Upatissa's blindness and old age, he was unable to lead the army himself. The defense of the kingdom fell to his son, Prince Giri Kasyapa, a capable warrior. The Siege: Silakala initially engaged the royal forces near the capital but later executed a strategic retreat to the Eastern Mountains (Pacinatissapabbata) to secure a better position. He then returned with a massive force and surrounded Anuradhapura. The Defeat: After seven days of fighting, Prince Giri Kasyapa realized the city could not be held.

== Death ==
Facing imminent defeat, Prince Giri Kasyapa attempted to flee the city under the cover of darkness, taking his old parents (King Upatissa and the Queen) and the royal regalia to the central highlands (Malaya Rata). However, their guides misled them, and they wandered around the city until dawn, eventually being surrounded by Silakala's forces. Realizing there was no escape, Prince Giri Kasyapa committed suicide by cutting his own throat. When King Upatissa II heard the news of his son's death, he was overcome with shock and grief and died immediately. He had reigned for only one and a half years.

== See also ==
- List of Sri Lankan monarchs
- History of Sri Lanka

Upatissa II House of Moriya Born: ? ? Died: ? ?
Regnal titles
Preceded by Siva II	King of Anuradhapura; 525–526	Succeeded by Silakala Ambosamanera
