= Silakala Ambasamanera =

Silakala සීලාකාල
- King of Anuradhapura
- Reign: 518–531
- Coronation: Salamevan (coronation name)
- Predecessor: Upatissa II
- Successor: Dathappabhuti
- Issue: Dathappabhuti; Moggallana II
Names
- Ambasamanera; Kashyapa Kalasena; Jetta Kashyapa
- Dynasty: House of Lambakanna
- Father: Dathappabhuti
- Religion: Theravada Buddhism

Silakala (Sinhala: සීලාකාල), (reigned c. 518 – 531 CE) was a monarch of the Anuradhapura Kingdom in Sri Lanka. Initially known as Ambasamanera during his time as a monk in India, he is historically significant for bringing the Hair Relic (Keshadhatu) of the Buddha to Sri Lanka and for his subsequent rise to the throne through military rebellion.

== Early life and exile ==
During the reign of King Kashyapa I, a Lambakarna nobleman named Dathappabhuti served the court. Due to a dispute with the king, Dathappabhuti fled to a distant province. His son, Prince Silakala, subsequently fled to India alongside Prince Moggallana (who would later become King Moggallana I) to escape the political instability. While in India, Silakala entered the Buddhist order at the Bodhimanda Vihara (near Bodh Gaya) as a sāmaṇera, and became known as Ambasamanera. During this period, he came into possession of the Hair Relic (Keshadhatu) of the Buddha. The historical text Keshadhatuvamsa, which described how he obtained the relic, is no longer extant.

== Return to Sri Lanka ==
When Prince Moggallana defeated Kashyapa and ascended the throne as King Moggallana I, Amba Samanera felt it was safe to return. He brought the Hair Relic to Sri Lanka, where he was received with high honor by the king. The relic became a revered object of worship. Following his return, Silakala disrobed and returned to lay life. King Moggallana appointed him the custodian of the Hair Relic and the Sword of State (Asiggaha), granting him the title Asiggaha Silakala. As a further mark of honor, the King gave his sister in marriage to Silakala.

== Rise to power ==
Silakala remained a powerful figure through the reigns of Moggallana and his successor, Kumara Dhatusena. When Upatissa II (the husband of Moggallana's sister) took the throne, Silakala believed he had a greater claim to kingship. Although King Upatissa attempted to appease Silakala by giving his own daughter in marriage to him, Silakala launched a rebellion.

Silakala retreated to the Dakshinadesa (Southern Province), raised an army, and looted the area to fund his campaign. He then marched on the capital. At the time, King Upatissa was old and blind; therefore, his son, Prince Kashyapa, led the defense. Silakala initially retreated to secure a better strategic base at Pacinatissapabbata (Eastern Mountain). He succeeded in this goal and was eventually able to surround the city of Anuradhapura once. But after seven days, Prince Kashyapa lost the fight. Hence he attempted to flee to the Malayadesha (Central Mountain area) with his parents and the royal regalia. Misled by their guides, they were surrounded by Silakala's forces. Prince Kashyapa committed suicide, and King Upatissa died of grief shortly after.

== Reign and administration ==
Silakala ascended the throne around 518 AD and ruled for 13 years. Chronicles refer to him by the throne name Silameghavanna (Salamevan). Historian Senarath Paranavitana suggests he is the figure referred to as "Jetta Kashyapa" in the Cūḷavaṃsa. Chinese historical records mention an embassy sent by a Sri Lankan king named Ka-ya-che-ka-ya-lo-ha-li-ya, which scholars identify as "Kashyapa Silakala."

=== Administrative division ===
To ensure stability, Silakala divided the administration of the kingdom among his three sons. Moggallana, the eldest, was granted administration of the Eastern Province (Puratthimadesa). Dathappabhuti, his second son, was granted administration of the Southern Province (Dakshinadesa) and the defense of the coastline. He was given the title Malayaraja. Upatissa, the youngest, was the king's favorite, and he was kept at the palace in Anuradhapura to reside with his father.

=== Religious policies ===
King Silakala's reign is noted for its support of Mahayana Buddhism, likely influenced by his time in India. He brought the Hair Relic to Sri Lanka himself, and held it in high esteem.

=== The arrival of the Dhammadhatu ===
In the twelfth year of his reign, a young merchant named Purna brought a significant Mahayana text known as the Dhammadhatu (believed to be the Lotus Sutra, a.k.a. the Saddharmapundarika Sutra) to Sri Lanka from Varanasi. King Silakala received this text with high honor, housing it at the Jetavanaramaya and organizing a grand annual festival for its worship.

The text created conflict between the king and the monks of the Mahavihara (the center of Theravada orthodoxy), who were strongly opposed to the king's acceptance of these "heretical" texts. The Cūḷavaṃsa chronicler criticizes the king, comparing his understanding of the Dhamma to a "firefly who thinks it is the sun."

=== The rise of Mahanaga ===
During Silakala's reign, a significant political event occurred in the Ruhuna region that would lead to the establishment of a new royal lineage. This centered on Mahanaga, a member of the Moriya clan.

Mahanaga was an ambitious man from a farming family who abandoned agriculture to become a bandit in the forests of Ruhuna. After some time, Mahanaga abandoned banditry and traveled to Anuradhapura to serve King Silakala. Viewing this as an opportunity to solve the unrest in the south, Silakala appointed Mahanaga as the revenue collector (ayakami) for Ruhuna. Mahanaga performed his duties effectively and was eventually promoted to the high military rank of Andasenapathi.

As his power grew, Mahanaga's ambition returned. Alllying with his kinsman Agbo (Aggabodhi), he rebelled against King Silakala. The rebellion was successful, resulting in Mahanaga becoming the independent ruler of Ruhuna while Silakala continued to rule in Anuradhapura.

=== Conclusion of reign ===
King Silakala died in 531 AD. His death triggered a struggle for the throne among his sons, and his second son Dathappabhuti ultimately took the throne.

== See also ==
- List of Sri Lankan monarchs
- History of Sri Lanka

Silakala Ambasamanera House of Moriya Born: ? ? Died: ? ?
Regnal titles
Preceded by Upatissa II	King of Anuradhapura; 526–539	Succeeded by Dathappabhuti
