= The God King =

- Directed by: Lester James Peries
- Written by: Anthony Greville-Bell
- Produced by: Dimitri de Grunwald
- Starring: Leigh Lawson Swineetha Weerasinghe; Oliver Tobias; Geoffrey Russell; Ravindra Randeniya
- Cinematography: William Blake
- Edited by: Sumitra Peries; Russ Lloyd; Robert Richardson
- Music by: Nimal Mendis; Lawrence Ashmore
- Release date: 1975
- Running time: 99 min
- Countries: Sri Lanka; United Kingdom
- Languages: English; Sinhala
- Budget: $3 million

The God King is a 1974 British–Sri Lankan historical film directed by Lester James Peries. The film is based on the historical clash between brothers Kasyapa and Moggalana on Sigiriya Rock.

Producer Dimitri de Grunwald financed the epic film as a dual project between England and Sri Lanka. He provided the three main actors, the script, the assistant director, the production Manager, makeup artist and money while the task of making the film was managed by Sri Lankan artists.

== Plot ==
King Kasyapa (Leigh Lawson) is the son of King Dhatusena (Geoffrey Russell). Kasyapa had murdered his father by walling him alive and then usurping the throne, which rightfully belonged to his brother Mogallana (Ravindra Randeniya), Dhatusena's son by the true queen. Mogallana fled to India to escape assassination by Kasyapa but vowed revenge. In India he raised an army with the intention of returning and retaking the throne of Sri Lanka which was rightfully his. Knowing the inevitable return of Mogallana, Kasyapa is said to have built his palace on the summit of Sigiriya as a fortress and pleasure palace.

== Cast ==
Actor	Role
Leigh Lawson	Kasyapa, the God King
Oliver Tobias	Migara
Geoffrey Russell	King Dhatusena
Ravindra Randeniya	Moggallana
Iranganie Serasinghe	Varuni
Joe Abeywickrema	Swami
Anne Loos	Leila
Vijaya Kumaranatunga	Lalith
Douglas Wickremasinghe	Council Leader
Mano Breckenridge	Opposition Leader
Menik Kurukulasuriya	Somitra

== See also ==
- Cinema of Sri Lanka
- List of Asian historical drama films
