= Moggallana =

Moggallana may refer to:

- Maudgalyayana, a chief disciple of The Buddha
- Moggallāna Thera, the author of the Abhidhānappadīpikā

== Rulers of the Anuradhapura Kingdom in Sri Lanka ==
- Moggallana I of Anuradhapura
- Moggallana II of Anuradhapura
- Moggallana III of Anuradhapura

== See also ==
- Mudgala, a Vedic sage of Hinduism
- Mudgala Upanishad, a Hindu religious text
- Mudgala Purana, a minor Hindu scripture
- Mudgal, a town in Karnataka, India
- Mudgal Committee, committee headed by Mukul Mudgal to report on match-fixing in cricket in India
- Mudgar, a type of Indian mace
