= Janashrayi-Chhandovichiti =

Janashrayi-Chhandovichiti (IAST: Jānāśrayī Chandoviciti, also known as Janāśraya-chandas) is a 6th or 7th century Sanskrit-language work on prosody. The text was considered a lost work, until its fragments were discovered in the 20th century.

== Authorship ==
The text is written in the form of sutra (actual content) with vritti (explanation or commentary). The opening stanza of the book praises a king named Janashraya (IAST: Janāśraya) as follows:

The king possessing extraordinary intelligence, to whom the wealth is the only refuge; attains victory; the lord hears the name Janashraya which has been rendered meaningful by his glorious deeds; who has imprisoned the fortune of victory of Indra in this world forever by marvellous sacrifices, is the conqueror of all the enemies.

— Janashrayi-Chhandovichiti

The text names Ganasvamin as its commentator. According to one theory, Janashraya authored the text, and Ganasvamin wrote a commentary on it. However, the commentator does not name Janashraya as the text's author, and makes no mention of the king's poetic or scholarly talents while praising him. Therefore, it is possible that the work was composed by another person and Janashraya was merely the writer's patron.

== Date ==
The text has been variously dated to 6th or 7th century, based on the possible dates for Janashraya, whose identity is not certain. The introductory verses in the text suggests that Janashraya was a king who had performed many ritual sacrifices. From the available epigraphic evidence, only a Vishnukundina king named Madhava-varman is known to have held the title "Janashraya", as attested by the Polamuru and Ipur copper-plate inscriptions. This king has been described as a performer of many sacrifices in the dynasty's grant inscriptions.

Scholar C. R. Swaminathan, who dated the Polamuru inscription to 593 and ascribed it to the Vishnukundina king Madhava-varman I, suggested that this king may be identified as Janashraya. Janashrayi-Chhandovichiti includes quotations from the Sanskrit poet Kumaradasa, and Swaminathan's interest in dating Janashraya was to determine Kumaradasa's date. Swaminathan identified Kumaradasa as the 6th century Simhala king Kumara-Dhatusena, and noted that it is unlikely that the writings of a Simhala king became popular in the Vishnukundina-ruled Andhra region in such a short time (by the reign of Mahdava-varman I). Therefore, he alternatively suggested that Janashraya may have been the later Vishnukundina king Madhava-varman II, the end of whose reign he assigns to c. 620. However, there is no evidence that Madhava-varman II bore the title "Janashraya".

Scholars B. V. Krishna Rao, R. Subba Rao, V. S. Ramachandramurty, and E. V. Laksmana Rao believed that the Polanmuru inscription was issued by Madhava-varman III, whose reign they date between the years 546 and 610. Scholar Ratna Chanda dated the work to the 7th century, to the last years of this king's reign.

== Telugu metres ==
Janashrayi-Chhandovichiti is notable for dealing with the metres used in Telugu language, including some metres that are not found in Sanskrit prosody. This indicates that Telugu poetry existed during or around the 6th century.
