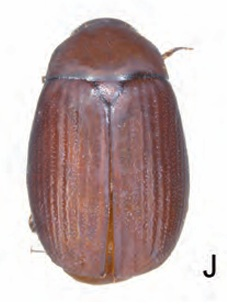

Scientific classification
- Kingdom: Animalia
- Phylum: Arthropoda
- Class: Insecta
- Order: Coleoptera
- Suborder: Polyphaga
- Infraorder: Scarabaeiformia
- Family: Scarabaeidae
- Genus: Maladera
- Species: M. padaviyaensis

Binomial name
- Maladera padaviyaensis Ahrens & Fabrizi, 2016

= Maladera padaviyaensis =

Species of beetle

Maladera padaviyaensis is a species of beetle of the family Scarabaeidae. It is found in Sri Lanka.

== Description ==
Adults reach a length of about 7.6 mm (0.30 in). They have a dark reddish brown, oblong-oval body with yellowish antennae. They are mostly dull and the dorsal surface is nearly glabrous, except for some setae on the head.

== Etymology ==
The species is named after its type locality, Padaviya.
