= Siva II =

Siva II දෙවන සිව
- King of Anuradhapura
- Reign: 524 – 525
- Predecessor: Kittisena
- Successor: Upatissa II
- Dynasty: House of Moriya

Siva II (Sinhala: දෙවන සිව), was King of Anuradhapura in the 6th century, whose reign lasted from 524 to 525. He succeeded his nephew Kittisena as King of Anuradhapura and was succeeded by Upatissa II.

== See also ==
- List of Sri Lankan monarchs
- History of Sri Lanka

Siva II House of Moriya Born: ? ? Died: ? ?
Regnal titles
Preceded by Kittisena	King of Anuradhapura; 524–525	Succeeded by Upatissa II
