= Moggallana II =

- King of Anuradhapura
- Reign: 531– 551( 540-560)
- Predecessor: Dathappabhuti
- Successor: Kittisiri Meghavanna
- Issue: Kittisiri Meghavanna
- Dynasty: House of Lambakanna
- Father: Silakala Ambasamanera
- Religion: Theravada Buddhism

Moggallana II (reigned 531 – 551 CE) was a monarch of the Anuradhapura Kingdom of Sri Lanka. He was the eldest son of King Silakala and ascended the throne following a civil war against his brother, Dathappabhuti. Second only to King Mahasena and King Dhatusena as a tank builder, Moggallana II is recognized as one of the most distinguished and greatest kings of ancient Ceylon.

== Accession to the Throne ==
The path to the throne for Moggallana II was marked by a fratricidal war known as the "War of the Three Brothers." Upon the death of his father, King Silakala, in 531 CE, the second son, Dathapabhuti, seized the throne, bypassing Moggallana, who was the rightful heir. When the youngest brother, Upatissa, protested this usurpation, Dathappabhuti had him killed. Enraged by the murder of his brother, Moggallana marched from the East with his army. To avoid a massacre, the two brothers agreed to a single combat on elephants. Moggallana emerged victorious when Dathapabhuti committed suicide on the battlefield. Moggallana II subsequently entered the capital and was crowned king.

== Reign and Character ==
Moggallana II ruled for twenty years (531–551 CE). Historical records describe him as a ruler who earned the love and respect of his subjects. He was a man of letters and a poet, earning him the epithet "Dalimugalan" or "Dalupudiyak" (Poet Moggallana). Despite his military victory, he did not attempt to unify the entire island by force. The southern province of Ruhuna remained independent under the rule of Mahanaga. Moggallana II accepted this political reality and focused on administering the Rajarata region.

== Contributions to Irrigation ==
Moggallana II is celebrated as one of the great irrigation monarchs of Sri Lanka. His projects serve as a glowing testimony to the engineering skill and brilliance of ancient engineers.

Padaviya Tank (Padavapi): He is credited with constructing the Padavapi (known today as Padaviya), which is considered the largest tank in ancient Lanka that is still in use today.

Nachchaduwa Tank (Pattapasanavapi): He constructed the giant tank Pattapasanavapi (also known as Patpahanvewa or Nachchaduwa). This tank served as the main reservoir for irrigation projects under the Malvatu-Oya, the river flowing east of Anuradhapura. He built a dam across the Malvatu Oya to create this reservoir, which submerged approximately 4,408 acres.

== Religious Patronage ==
The King was a devout patron of Buddhism. He made numerous offerings to the monastic community and held the Dhamma in high regard. Notably, he organized a recital of the Tripitaka (the Buddhist canon) and had the texts written down to ensure their preservation.

== Succession and Death ==
Towards the end of his reign, a conspiracy emerged regarding the succession. Moggallana’s queen, determined to secure the throne for their son Kithsirimegha, began a campaign of poisoning the King's close relatives. King Moggallana II died in 551 CE. He was succeeded by his son, Kithsirimegha.

== Resources ==
Ray, H.C. (ed.) (2000) Lanka Vishwavidyalayaye Lanka Ithihasaya [University of Ceylon History of Ceylon]. Vol. 1, Part 1. 2nd edn. Kelaniya: University of Kelaniya.

== See also ==
- List of Sri Lankan monarchs
- History of Sri Lanka

Moggallana II House of Lambakanna Born: ? ? Died: ? ?
Regnal titles
Preceded by Dathappabhuti	King of Anuradhapura; 540–560	Succeeded by Kittisiri Meghavanna
