= Dathappabhuti =

Dathapabhuti
- King of Anuradhapura
- Reign: 531-(Six Months)/539-540
- Predecessor: Silakala Ambasamanera
- Successor: Moggallana II
- Dynasty: House of Lambakanna
- Father: Silakala Ambasamanera
- Religion: Theravada Buddhism

Dathappabhuti (reigned c. 531 CE) was a monarch of the Anuradhapura Kingdom of Sri Lanka. He was the second son of King Silakala. His reign was short-lived, lasting only six months, and was characterized by a violent war of succession known as the "War of the Three Brothers."

== Accession and Fratricide ==
Upon the death of King Silakala in 531 CE, a power struggle ensued among his three sons. Although Moggallana was the eldest son and the rightful heir, 'Dathapabhuti', who was the second son, seized the throne immediately after his father's death. The youngest brother, Prince Upatissa, who resided in the capital, opposed this action. He protested that the throne should not belong to Dathapabhuti. Enraged by this opposition, Dathapabhuti killed his younger brother Upatissa.

== Civil War ==
The murder of Upatissa provoked the eldest brother, Moggallana , who was administering the Eastern Province. Determined to punish Dathappabhuti for this crime, Moggallana gathered his army and marched toward the capital, establishing a camp at the Karinda Mountains (Karinda Pabbata).

== The Duel and Death ==
When the two armies met, the brothers made a decision to prevent mass slaughter. Out of compassion for their soldiers, they agreed to settle the dispute through single combat (Dwandwa Yuddhaya) mounted on elephants. They decided that the victor of the duel would claim the kingdom. During the duel, Dathappabhuti’s elephant was wounded. Realizing that defeat was imminent and refusing to be captured, King Dathappabhuti committed suicide on the battlefield by cutting his own throat. His reign lasted only six months.

== See also ==
- List of Sri Lankan monarchs
- History of Sri Lanka

Dathappabhuti House of Moriya Born: ? ? Died: ? ?
Regnal titles
Preceded by Silakala Ambosamanera	King of Anuradhapura; 539–540	Succeeded by Moggallana II
