= Kittisiri Meghavanna =

- King of Anuradhapura
- Reign: 551-569(560 – 561)
- Predecessor: Moggallana II
- Successor: Maha Naga
- Dynasty: House of Lambakanna
- Father: Moggallana II
- Religion: Theravada Buddhism

Kithsirimegha (reigned 551 – 569 CE) was a monarch of the Anuradhapura Kingdom. He was the son and successor of King Moggallana II and is historically noted as the final ruler of the Dhatusena dynasty. His reign is characterized by administrative decline, political corruption, and a significant scholarly dispute regarding the duration of his rule.

== Accession and Regency ==
Kithsirimegha ascended the throne following the death of his father, Moggallana II, in 551 CE. Prior to his accession, his mother, the Queen, had engaged in a ruthless campaign to eliminate potential rivals by poisoning the King’s close relatives to ensure Kithsirimegha’s succession. It appears that Kithsirimegha was a weak ruler, possibly lacking the capability to govern effectively. Consequently, his mother assumed the role of the de facto ruler. However, she was unable to manage the state efficiently, leading to a period of severe deterioration in governance.

== Administration and Decline ==
The administration under Kithsirimegha (and his mother) is described as deeply corrupt.

Corruption: With no firm hand to control the state, bribery became rampant among officials. The text notes that officials fell to the level of taking bribes openly.

Public Discontent: The powerful citizens of the country lived without fear of law, oppressing the weak. This led to widespread frustration and disappointment among the general populace, creating an environment ripe for rebellion.

== Duration of Reign ==
There is a significant historical discrepancy regarding the length of Kithsirimegha's reign.

The Culavamsa Tradition: Some copies of the Culavamsa chronicle state that Kithsirimegha was killed by the rebel Mahanaga after reigning for only 19 days. The provided text argues this is factually incorrect.

Historical Evidence for 19 Years: Other historical texts, such as the Rajavaliya and Pujavaliya, state that he reigned for 19 years. This timeline is supported by archaeological evidence. Historian Senarath Paranavitana cites the Tammegoda Vihara inscription, which was written in the fourth year of a King Kithsirimegha. This confirms that he ruled for much longer than 19 days, and the text concludes that 19 years is the accurate duration. It is believed that the rival claimant to the throne, Mahanaga, who had established power in the Ruhuna region, waited patiently for a long period (19 years) to avoid a difficult war, eventually taking the throne in 569 CE when the time was right.

== End of Reign ==
The reign of Kithsirimegha ended in 569 CE when Mahanaga, the independent ruler of Ruhuna, finally launched his campaign to seize the capital. Mahanaga succeeded in taking the throne, thereby restoring peace to the country and establishing a new royal lineage.

== See also ==
- List of Sri Lankan monarchs
- History of Sri Lanka

Kittisiri Meghavanna House of Moriya Born: ? ? Died: ? ?
Regnal titles
Preceded by Moggallana II	King of Anuradhapura; 560–561	Succeeded by Maha Naga
