= Kittisena =

Kittisena කිට්ටිසේන
- King of Anuradhapura
- Reign: 524 – 524
- Predecessor: Kumara Dhatusena
- Successor: Siva II
- Dynasty: House of Moriya
- Father: Kumara Dhatusena

Kittisena (Sinhala: කිට්ටිසේන), was King of Anuradhapura in the 6th century, whose reign lasted the year 524. He succeeded his father Kumara Dhatusena as King of Anuradhapura. He was assassinated and succeeded by his uncle Siva II.

== See also ==
- List of Sri Lankan monarchs
- History of Sri Lanka

Kittisena House of Moriya Born: ? ? Died: ? ?
Regnal titles
Preceded by Kumara Dhatusena	King of Anuradhapura; 524–524	Succeeded by Siva II
