= Abhidhānappadīpikā =

- OpenTipitaka: Abhidhānappadīpikā; Abhidhānappadīpikāṭīkā
- Type: Dictionary/thesaurus
- Parent: Byākaraṇaganthasaṅgaha
- Composition: c. 12th century
- Attribution: Moggallāna Thera
- Abbreviation: Abh
- Related: Abhidhānappadīpikāṭīkā

The Abhidhānappadīpikā is a Pali thesaurus composed in the twelfth century by the Sri Lankan grammarian Moggallāna Thera. It is based on the Sanskrit thesaurus Amarakośa, and closely follows its style and method.

Like the Amarakośa, the Abhidhānappadīpikā consists of three parts: celestial objects, terrestrial objects and miscellaneous objects. Each part consists of several sections. The work is a thesaurus or dictionary of synonyms, grouping together the names of a particular thing in verse form for easy memorization. The last two sections of the last part are devoted to homonyms and indeclinable particles.

== Commentaries ==
A commentary was written by a Burmese minister under King Kittisīhasūra around the 14th century. A Burmese translation was made in the eighteenth century. A paraphrase (sanna) and a subcommentary (ṭīkā) were composed in Sri Lanka. According to Malalasekera, the sanna is the older and more valuable work.

== Editions ==
Abhidhānappadīpikā; or, Dictionary of the Pali language by Vaskaduve Subhuti, Colombo, 1865, A Sinhala script edition with English explanations.

== Bibliography ==
- Malalasekera, G. P.; Bode, M. H.; Saddhātissa, H. (2013). Pali Literature: The Pali Literature of Ceylon, The Pali Literature of Burma, The Pali Literature of South-East Asia (PDF). Kandy, Sri Lanka: Buddhist Publication Society.
- Malalasekera, G. P. (1937). Dictionary of Pali Proper Names, Vol. I. London: John Murray. Entry 'Abhidhānappadīpikā' is also available online at vipassana.info.
