= Padaviya =

Padaviya පදවිය
- Town
- Padaviya tank
- Country: Sri Lanka
- Province: North Central
- District: Anuradhapura
- Divisional Secretariat: Padaviya
- පදීනගර: 120 BC
- Time zone: UTC+5:30 (Sri Lanka Standard Time)

Padaviya (Sinhala: පදවිය) is a historic town in the Anuradhapura District of the North Central Province, Sri Lanka.

== Background ==
Renowned for its cultural and agricultural heritage dating back to the ancient Anuradhapura era (3rd century BC to 10th century AD), Padaviya is intricately linked to the historical Padaviya Wewa, an ancient irrigation tank, and scattered ruins from the bygone era. Nestled within the Padaviya Divisional Secretariat, the town was known as "Padigama" (Sinhala: පදීගම) or "Padinagara" (Sinhala: පදීනගර) in ancient times, reflecting its historical roots.

== History and significance ==
During the Anuradhapura era, Padaviya played a pivotal role in the prosperity of the kingdom. Monarchs, recognizing the arid climate, constructed intricate irrigation systems, including tanks, canals, and sluices. These engineering marvels not only ensured sustained agricultural productivity but also transformed Padaviya into a thriving agricultural centre. Remnants of this ancient network can still be witnessed today, standing as testaments to the ingenuity of the Anuradhapura period.

The Mahavamsa, an ancient Pali chronicle, mentions the location as "Padigama and Padinagara."

The area around Padaviya was once a thriving commercial centre, with traces of a walled enclosure and structures indicative of long-distance and regional trade. Traces of buildings and Tamil inscriptions suggest connections with South Indian mercantile communities.

After a period of decline following the fall of the Rajarata civilization in the 13th century, Padaviya saw restoration efforts in the mid-20th century, leading to the establishment of colonization schemes and renewed agricultural activities. The region faced challenges due to terrorist activities and the North-Eastern war, but after the war's end in 2009, settlements in and around Padaviya have shown signs of growth and development.

== Padaviya Wewa and Ancient Inscription ==
In the northeast part of the North Central Province, Padaviya boasts two large ancient irrigation tanks – Padaviya Wewa and Vahalkada Wewa. Among these, Padaviya has garnered significant attention, believed by tradition to be the largest of the ancient tanks.

The Padaviya reservoir, initially known as Dhanavapi (Sinhala: ධනවාපි) and later as Padavapi (Sinhala: පදවාපි), is the second-largest tank in the Anuradhapura District. Built by King Moggallana II (531–551), it stands as a testament to ancient agricultural development and hydraulic engineering.

Historical accounts from colonial administrators, including Governor Sir Henry Ward and Sir Emerson Tennent, describe Padaviya Wewa as a "most gigantic" and "remarkable work" with estimates suggesting its construction engaged millions of people over 10–15 years. Detailed inspections in 1886 by Henry Parker from the Irrigation Department further recorded its impressive features.

There are debates about the original builder, with some attributing it to King Saddhatissa (137-119 BC) and King Mahasena (276–303). An ancient pillar inscription on the bund, though credited to King Parakramabahu I (1153–1186), suggests renovations or expansions by him rather than the initial construction.

The tank is formed by an embankment across Ma Oya, featuring an ancient Bisokotuwa with a stone tower, inlet openings, and a five-hooded cobra rock carving. The tank's design, including the use of a solid rock outcrop as the spillway, indicates sophisticated engineering from the Anuradhapura era.

Primary sources like "Padaviya Reservoir Project" by H De S Manamperi and historical records note Padaviya's significance as a large town of commercial and religious importance by the 11th century. Ruins of structures, including a dagoba, standing Buddha figure, and Hindu temples, highlight the diverse heritage of Padaviya.

== Ancient Monastery ==
The ancient monastery at the Padaviya Historical Place provides a historical significance of the Padaviya town, attributing its construction to King Mahasen between 276 CE and 303 CE, who ruled Sri Lanka during the Anuradhapura era. This era was marked by prosperity and advancements in engineering, as evidenced by the elaborate irrigation systems built during this time.

The complex comprises a parapet wall, water wells, image houses, dagobas, monasteries, and other buildings. These features are characteristic of Anuradhapura-era architecture and religious structures.

The construction of a Hindu temple within the complex at a later date suggests the site's religious significance transcended specific denominations and served as a space for diverse spiritual practices.

== Present-day Challenges ==
Despite its historical significance, Padaviya faces contemporary challenges. Water scarcity poses a threat to the town's agrarian economy and the livelihoods of its residents. Additionally, Chronic Kidney Disease of unknown etiology (CKDu) has emerged as a major health concern, significantly impacting the community. Addressing these challenges through sustainable water management strategies and improved healthcare access is crucial for the town's future.

== Culture and Community ==
Padaviya primarily consists of Sinhalese Buddhist families engaged in agriculture. Rice cultivation dominates the landscape, with other crops like vegetables and fruits also grown.

Religion in Padaviya DS Division (2012)

Buddhists 22,724-98.81%, Roman Catholics 216-0.94%, Other Christians 41-0.18%, Hindus 14-0.06%, Islam 3-0.01%, Others 0-0.00%

Total Population 22,998-100.00%.
