= Kumaradasa =

Sanskrit poet

Kumāradāsa is the author of a Sanskrit Mahākāvya called the Jānakī-haraṇa or Jānakī's abduction. Jānakī is another name of Sita, wife of Rama. Sita was abducted by Ravana when she along with the Rama, exiled from his kingdom, and Lakshmana was living in a forest which incident is taken from Ramayana ('Rama's Journey'), the great Hindu epic written by Valmiki.

The Sinhalese translation of his work, Jānakī-haraṇa, gave credence to the belief that Kumāradāsa was King Kumāradhātusena (513-522 A.D.) of Sri Lanka but most scholars do not make any such identification even though the poet at the end of his poem says that his father, Mānita, a commander of the rearguard of the Sinhalese King Kumāramaṇi, died in battle on the day he was born and that his maternal uncles, Megha and Agrabodhi, brought him up. Rajasekhara, who lived around 900 A.D., in his Kāvyamīmāmsā refers to the poet as born blind - मेधाविरुद्रकुमारदासादयः जात्यन्धाः. There is also a tradition that this poem was written by Kalidasa. Kumāradāsa came after Kalidasa and lived around 500 A.D., later than Bhāravi but before Māgha. While writing Jānakī-haraṇa, he certainly had before him Raghuvaṃśa of Kalidasa. Another legend recounts that Kālidāsa visits his friend Kumāradāsa, the king of Ceylon (modern day Lanka) and is murdered by a courtesan and overwhelmed with grief, Kumāradāsa also threw himself to the funeral pyre of Kālidāsa.

In his "Survey of Sanskrit Literature", about Kumāradāsa and Jānakī-haraṇa (20 Cantos), which poem the poet is believed to have written during his stay in Kanchipuram where he lived, C. Kunhan Raja Ph.D. says:

"In language, in the metres that he adopts, in the descriptions, in the entire technique of the epic, the influence which Kālidāsa must have exerted on the poet is quite plain…….he is quite original in his presentation of the theme…..He must have been a great scholar and grammarian…. he is never pedantic in his use of the language. He ranks as among the best poets, and in tradition, he is brought into an equal position with Kālidāsa and Raghuvaṃśa."

A verse in the Subhāṣita-ratna-kośa refers to Kumāradāsa's Jānakī-haraṇa:

jānakī-haraṇaṃ kartuṃ
raghuvaṃśe puraḥsthite /
kaviḥ kumāradāso vā
rāvaṇo vā yadi kṣamaḥ //

Translation:

To have produced an Abduction of Sita,
When the Dynasty of Raghu was present before him —
One must have been Kumāradāsa
or else been Rāvaṇa.
