= Kashyapa I =

King of Sri Lanka from 473 to 495

Kashyapa I (Kasyapa I) කශ්‍යප
- King of Anuradhapura
- Reign: 473–495
- Predecessor: Dhatusena
- Successor: Moggallana
- Born: c.448
- Died: 495 (aged 46-47)
- Issue: Princess Bodhi; Princess Uthpalawanna
- House: House of Moriya
- Dynasty: Moriya
- Father: Dhatusena
- Mother: A non-royal wife of King Dhatusena
- Religion: Therevada Buddhism

Kashyapa I, (Sinhala: සකශ්‍යප) also known as Kasyapa I or Kassapa I (Sinhala: කස්සප), was a king of Sri Lanka, who ruled the country from 473 to 495 CE. He was the second king of the royal Moriya dynasty of Sri Lanka. Kashyapa is credited with the construction of the Sigiriya citadel and the surrounding city. He acquired the throne by overthrowing his father, King Dhatusena, and usurping his brother and rightful heir to the throne, Moggallana, in a palace coup. He imprisoned and later immured his father. Kashyapa was also known as Pithru Ghathaka Kashyapa (Kashyapa the Patricide), after this incident. He was later defeated by Moggallana, who had fled to South India and returned with an army to regain the throne. Kashyapa was killed in the battle that ensued.

== Acquiring the throne ==
Though Kashyapa was the eldest son of the king, he was not the heir to the throne. Moggallana was the son of the royal consort and the rightful heir to the throne, while Kashyapa was born to a non-royal wife. However, Kashyapa sought to acquire the throne by usurping Moggallana. He was assisted by the commander of the king’s army, Migara, who sought vengeance for a disagreement between himself and the king. Assisted and encouraged by Migara, Kashyapa carried out a palace coup and overthrew Dhatusena.

Dhatusena was imprisoned, and Kashyapa became the king of the country in 473, as the second king in the Moriyan Dynasty of Sri Lanka. However, Moggallana fled to South India, fearing that his brother would assassinate him. Migara led Kashyapa to believe that Dhatusena had treasures of large wealth hidden away, and Kashyapa demanded these treasures from the imprisoned king. Dhatusena took his captors to the Kala wewa, a large irrigation tank he had constructed, and told him that it was the only treasure he had. Enraged at this, Kasyapa had his father murdered by immuring him in a wall. (an alternate story is that he was buried alive in the bund wall of the Kala weva.

== Construction of the city and citadel at Sigiriya ==
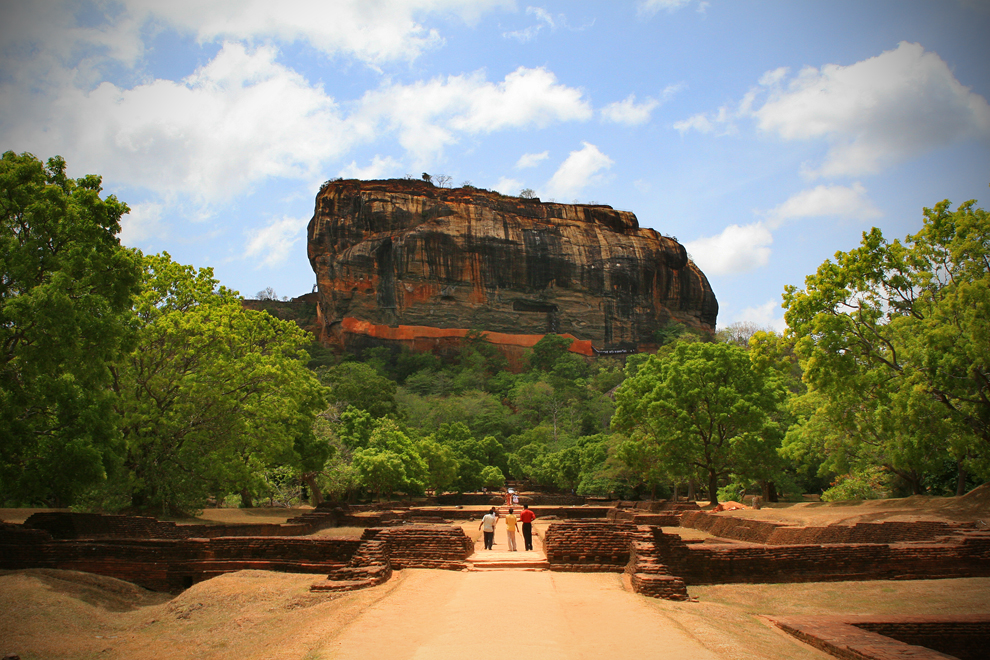
The Sigiriya rock and its surrounding gardens

Kashyapa was disgraced among the public and the bikkhus, and he received the name Pithru Ghathaka Kashyapa, meaning Kashyapa the Patricide. Because of this, and fearing an attack from Moggallana, Kashyapa moved his capital and residence from the traditional capital of Anuradhapura to the more secure location of Sigiriya rock. At Sigiriya, he constructed a large citadel and elaborate city. His palace was built on top of the Sigiriya rock.

Sigiriya was a large rock rising above the surrounding plain, offering an unhindered view in all directions. It was chosen as the capital because of the strategic advantage this would give the defenders during an attack. Large ramparts and moats were built around the city. An elaborate and large garden was built around the rock. These gardens consisted a number of pools, fountains and other structures. A complex underground irrigation system supplied water to these pools and fountains, and the fountains are functional to this day.

The constructions on top of the Sigiriya rock include the king’s palace among several other buildings and pools. The Sigiriya frescoes, which depict maidens carrying flowers, were also created during Kashyapa’s reign at Sigiriya. The Mirror Wall which is also known as the Ketapath Pawura is another important creation.

== Defeat and death ==
Moggallana organised an army in South India and returned to Sri Lanka to claim his right to the throne. In the battle that ensued in the plains surrounding Sigiriya, Kashyapa’s army was defeated. The king tried a tactical move on his war elephant, which his troops interpreted as retreating, and abandoned him. Instead of being captured by his brother, the king committed ritual suicide while on his Elephant with his own sword. Kashyapa’s reign as king of Sri Lanka ended with this defeat in 495, and Moggallana became the king as Moggallana I.

== See also ==
- Mahavamsa
- List of Sri Lankan monarchs
- History of Sri Lanka

Kashyapa I King of Sri Lanka
Regnal titles
Preceded by Dhatusena	King of Rajarata; 473–495 AD	Succeeded by Moggallana I
