= Dhatusena =

King of Sri Lanka (r. 455–473)

Dhatusena (Dasenkeli) ධාතුසේන
- King of Anuradhapura
- Reign: 455–473 AD
- Predecessor: Pithiya
- Successor: Kasyapa I
- Born: 429
- Died: 473
- Issue: Kasyapa I Moggallana I
- House: Moriyan dynasty
- Father: Dathanama of Nandivapigama
- Mother: Princess Sangha
- Religion: Theravāda Buddhism

Dhatusena (Sinhala: ධාතුසේන) was a king of Sri Lanka who reigned from 455 to 473 AD. He was the first king of the Moriyan dynasty. In some records, he is also identified as Dasenkeli. Dhatusena reunited the country under his rule after twenty-six years of anarchy, defeating the six Dravidians that were ruling the country at that time. Dhatusena built large reservoirs and canals to augment the agriculture in the country.

== Early life and becoming king ==
Dhatusena's ancestry is uncertain. The Cūḷavaṃsa, the ancient chronicle of Sri Lanka, tells us that he was of royal lineage whose ancestors had fled the royal capital about three hundred seventy-five years earlier. According to Mahavamsa, His grandfather had lived in Nandivapi Grama (Village) and his father in the name of "Dhata" had lived in Ambilayagugama. He had two sons, Dhatusena (the eldest and future king) and Silathisbodhi. The country was invaded in 433 by Tamils apparently of or related to the Pandyan dynasty from South India, known as "the Six Dravidians". They overthrew and killed Mittasena and ruled the Anuradhapura Kingdom for twenty-six years, from 433 to 459. During this time, Sinhalese leaders abandoned Rajarata and fled to the Ruhuna principality in the south of the country. Ruhuna was used as the base for resistance against the invading rulers.

Dhatusena was raised by his uncle, a Buddhist monk named Mahanama. The Pandyan invaders were searching for Dhatusena, and his uncle ordained him as a Buddhist monk to disguise him. Dhatusena later organised a resistance movement against the Tamil invaders and led a rebellion against them. Dhatusena claimed the kingship of the country in 455. By the time Dhatusena started the rebellion, three of the six Pandayn invaders were already dead by fighting themselves, and in the battles that occurred during the rebellion, two more were defeated. The final battle took place in circa 459, where the last king, Pithiya, was defeated. Having defeated the Parindyan invaders, Dhatusena was crowned as the king of Sri Lanka in 459, taking Anuradhapura as his capital. After his coronation, he had had the villages of the fervent supporters of the former Dravidian kings confiscated as a penalty for their disloyalty.

== Services as king ==
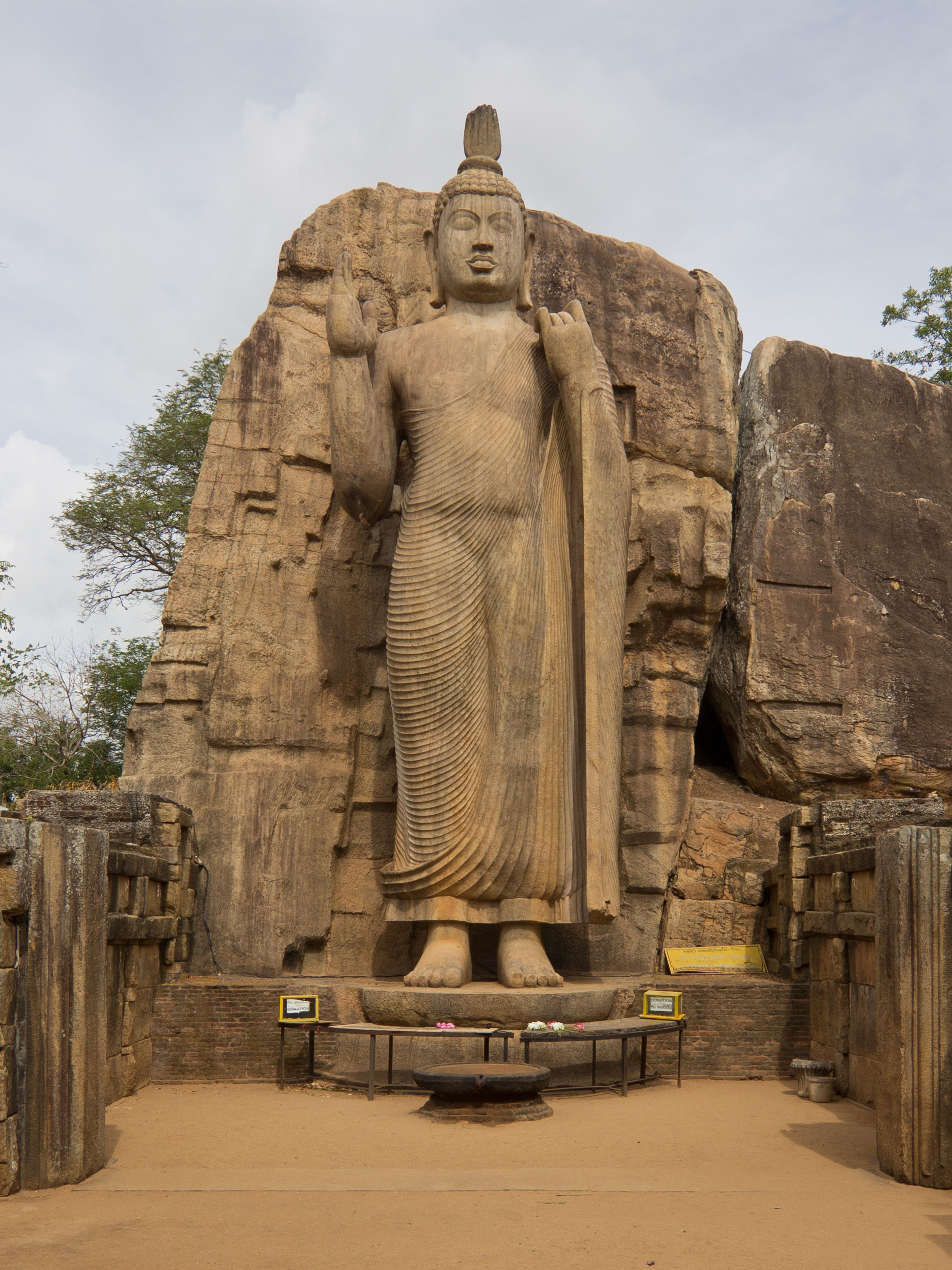
The Avukana Buddha Statue which was created during the reign of Dhatusena

After being enthroned, he persuaded the people who have fled to Ruhuna to re-populace their abandoned regions in Anuradhapura.

Dhatusena built eighteen massive irrigation tanks and eighteen small irrigation tanks in order to develop agriculture in the country. Among these tanks are the Kala Wewa and Balaluwewa, which are interconnected and cover an area of 6,380 acres (2,580 ha) and 7000 acres are/were cultivated from this huge volume of water. He had also built Padaviya Wewa(Dana Wewa), Yodha wewa(Manamuthu Wewa), Meddaketiya Wewa and Maeliya Wewa.

He also constructed the Yodha Ela, also known as Jayaganga, an irrigation canal carrying water from Kala Wewa to Tissawewa tank in a journey of approx. 54 miles from Anuradhapura. Yoda Ela descends 95 millimeters at each kilometer. This is regarded as a great technological achievement.

The Avukana Buddha statue, a 13-metre (43 ft) high statue of Gautama Buddha, is also a creation of Dhatusena. Lahugala Magulmahaviharaya was also built by this king. Further reports suggest that there was a tradition of crowning a Buddha sculpture and thus having the king's powers under the auspices of Buddhism which would make it possible for the king to govern the country in unity.

He also had installed Vajra-Chumbhatas (lightning rod) on the top of the three main dagobas in Anuradhapura.

The Culavamsa describes this king as the builder of 18 vihara (temple complexes). For an example, he restored the ''Mahapalidhanasala'' into its original state. During his reign a redaction of the Pali Tipitaka ("3 baskets", the theravada canon) took place.

== Death ==
Dhatusena had two sons, Kasyapa I, Moggallana I and a daughter. Moggallana was the son of the royal consort and the rightful heir to the throne, while Kasyapa was born to a non-royal concubine. Dhatusena’s daughter was married to his sister’s son and the general of his army, Migara. Later, as a consequence of an argument between his daughter and her husband, Migara, she was severely tortured by him which in turn enraged Dhatusena who then ordered his mother (Dhatusena's sister) to be burned alive. In reprisal, Migara encouraged and assisted Kasyapa to overthrow the king and take the throne. Kasyapa eventually rebelled against Dhatusena and overthrew him. Dhatusena was imprisoned and Kasyapa became the king of the country in 473.

Migara led Kasyapa to believe that Dhatusena had hidden treasures of great wealth and persuaded him to find these. When asked to lead Kasyapa to where these treasures were hidden, Dhatusena led him to the Kalavewa and taking water into his hands, claimed that this was the only treasure he had. Enraged at this, Kasyapa had him murdered by immuring him in a wall. (an alternate story is that he was buried alive in the bund of the Kalaweva). He went and wrought a castle on Sigiriya Rock while his brother and the rightful heir fled to India.

== See also ==
- Kala Wewa
- Mahavamsa
- List of Sri Lankan monarchs
- History of Sri Lanka
