= Kumara Dhatusena =

Kumara Dhatusena කුමාර ධාතුසේන
- Sirisagaboyi

King of Anuradhapura
- Reign: 515 – 524
- Predecessor: Moggallana I
- Successor: Kittisena
- Issue: Kittisena
Names
- Kumāradāsa; Kumara Sirisagaboyi
- Dynasty: House of Moriya
- Father: Moggallana I
- Religion: Theravada Buddhism

Kumara Dhatusena (Sinhala: කුමාර ධාතුසේන), was King of Anuradhapura in the 6th century, whose reign lasted from 515 to 524. He succeeded his father Moggallana I as King of Anuradhapura and was succeeded by his son Kittisena.

== See also ==
- Kumaradasa, a poet sometimes identified with Kumara Dhatusena
- List of Sri Lankan monarchs
- History of Sri Lanka

Kumara Dhatusena House of Moriya Born: ? ? Died: ? ?
Regnal titles
| Preceded by Moggallana I | King of Anuradhapura; 515–524 | Succeeded by Kittisena |
