= Moggallana I =

Moggallana I පළමුවන මොග්ගල්ලාන
- King of Anuradhapura
- Reign: 497–515
- Predecessor: Kashyapa I
- Successor: Kumara Dhatusena
- Issue: Kumara Dhatusena
- House: House of Moriya
- Dynasty: Moriya
- Father: Dhatusena
- Mother: Queen Consort of Dhatusena
- Religion: Therevada Buddhism

Moggallāna I (Sinhala: පළමුවන මොග්ගල්ලාන),was King of Anuradhapura in the 6th century, whose reign lasted from 497 to 515. After defeating his brother Kashyapa I in a civil war, he replaced Kashyapa as King of Anuradhapura, and was succeeded by his son Kumara Dhatusena.

Under his reign there were two schools of Theravāda Buddhism: the Dhammaruci (Joy in the Dhamma), living in the Maha-vihara, and the Sāgali School. The latter school had monks (bhikkhu) as well as nuns (bhikkhuni). Moggallāna I "built a shelter for (them and) called it Rājinī" (Queens [abode]).

== See also ==
- List of Sri Lankan monarchs
- History of Sri Lanka

Moggallana I House of Moriya Born: ? ? Died: ? ?
Regnal titles
Preceded by Kashyapa I	King of Anuradhapura; 497–515	Succeeded by Kumara Dhatusena
